= List of heads of state of Zimbabwe =

This article lists the heads of state of Zimbabwe from the Unilateral Declaration of Independence (UDI) of Rhodesia in 1965 to the present day.

From 1965 to 1970 the head of state under the UDI was the Monarch in person of Elizabeth II, who simultaneously reigned as the Monarch of the United Kingdom and the other Commonwealth realms.

Ian Smith's government continued to affirm allegiance to Elizabeth II as Queen of Rhodesia from the UDI until 1970, but this was not acknowledged by the international community.

The 'Monarch' was represented in Rhodesia by the Officer Administrating of the Government, because Smith and his cabinet ignored Sir Humphrey Gibbs, the Governor of Southern Rhodesia.

Rhodesia became a republic under the Constitution of 1969, adopted following the 1969 constitutional referendum, and the 'Monarch' and Officer Administrating of the Government were replaced by a ceremonial President of Rhodesia.

== Background ==
Initially, the territory was referred to as "South Zambezia", a reference to the River Zambezi, until the name "Rhodesia" came into use in 1895. This was in honour of Cecil Rhodes, the British empire-builder and key figure during the British expansion into southern Africa. The British government agreed that Rhodes' company, the British South Africa Company (BSAC), would administer the territory stretching from the Limpopo to Lake Tanganyika under charter as a protectorate. Queen Victoria signed the charter in 1889. The territory north of the Zambezi was the subject of separate treaties with African chiefs: today, it forms the country of Zambia. The designation "Southern Rhodesia" was first used officially in 1898 in the Southern Rhodesia Order in Council of 20 October 1898, which applied to the area south of the Zambezi, and was more common after the BSAC merged the administration of the two northern territories as Northern Rhodesia in 1911.

== Unrecognised monarchy (1965–1970) ==
On 7 October 1964 the Southern Rhodesian government announced that when Northern Rhodesia achieved independence as Zambia, the Southern Rhodesian government would officially become known as the Rhodesian Government and the colony would become known as Rhodesia. On 23 October of that year, the Minister of Internal Affairs notified the Press that the Constitution would be amended to make this official. The Legislative Assembly then passed an Interpretation Bill to declare that the colony could be referred to as Rhodesia. The Bill received its third reading on 9 December 1964, and passed to the Governor for assent.

On 11 November 1965, following a brief but solemn consensus, Rhodesia's leading statesmen issued their country's Unilateral Declaration of Independence (UDI). This was immediately denounced as an "act of rebellion against the Crown" in the United Kingdom, and Prime Minister Harold Wilson promised that the illegal action would be short-lived. Initially, the state retained its pledged loyalty to Elizabeth II, Queen of the United Kingdom, recognizing her as Queen of Rhodesia. However, few seemed to initially realize that Rhodesia was no longer within the Commonwealth's direct sphere of influence and British rule was now a constitutional fiction; Salisbury remained virtually immune to credible metropolitan leverage.

No.	Portrait	Monarch (Birth–Death)	Purported reign			Royal House	Prime Minister
No.	Portrait	Monarch (Birth–Death)	Start	End	Duration	Royal House	Prime Minister
1		Queen Elizabeth II (1926–2022)	11 November 1965	2 March 1970	4 years, 111 days	Windsor	Smith

The monarch's powers were the same as prior to the Unilateral Declaration of Independence. However they were de facto exercised by the Officer Administering the Government as the Queen's de jure representative, replacing the governor's authority from 1965 to 1970, until the position of a president was created.

No.	Portrait	Name (Birth–Death)	Term of office			Monarch	Prime Minister
No.	Portrait	Name (Birth–Death)	Took office	Left office	Time in office	Monarch	Prime Minister
1		Clifford Dupont (1905–1978)	17 November 1965	2 March 1970	4 years, 105 days	Elizabeth II	Ian Smith

== Republic of Rhodesia (1970–1979) ==
During a two-proposition referendum held in 1969, the proposal for severing all remaining ties to the Crown passed by a majority of 61,130 votes to 14,327. Rhodesia declared itself a republic on 2 March 1970.

Under the 1969 Constitution, the first constitution of the Republic of Rhodesia, the President replaced the monarch as ceremonial head of state. The President was elected by Parliament. In the event of a vacancy the President of the Senate served as Acting President.

No.	President	Term of office Duration in years and days		Party	Previous office	Ref.
1	Clifford Dupont; GCLM ID (1905–1978)	2 March 1970	31 December 1975	Rhodesian Front (RF)	Administrator of the Government (1965–1970)	—N/a
1	Clifford Dupont; GCLM ID (1905–1978)	5 years and 305 days		Rhodesian Front (RF)	Administrator of the Government (1965–1970)	—N/a
–	Henry Everard; GCLM ICD DSO TD (1897–1980)	31 December 1975	14 January 1976	Rhodesian Front (RF)	General Manager of Rhodesia Railways (1953–1958)	
–	Henry Everard; GCLM ICD DSO TD (1897–1980)	15 days		Rhodesian Front (RF)	General Manager of Rhodesia Railways (1953–1958)	
2	John Wrathall; GCLM ID (1913–1978)	14 January 1976	31 August 1978 ^{†}	Rhodesian Front (RF)	Minister of Finance (1964–1976)	—N/a
2	John Wrathall; GCLM ID (1913–1978)	2 years and 230 days		Rhodesian Front (RF)	Minister of Finance (1964–1976)	—N/a
–	Henry Everard; GCLM ICD DSO TD (1897–1980)	31 August 1978	1 November 1978	Rhodesian Front (RF)	General Manager of Rhodesia Railways (1953–1958)	
–	Henry Everard; GCLM ICD DSO TD (1897–1980)	63 days		Rhodesian Front (RF)	General Manager of Rhodesia Railways (1953–1958)	
–	Jack Pithey; GOLM ICD CBE (1903–1984)	1 November 1978	5 March 1979	Rhodesian Front (RF)	President of the Rhodesian Senate (1970–1979)	—N/a
–	Jack Pithey; GOLM ICD CBE (1903–1984)	125 days		Rhodesian Front (RF)	President of the Rhodesian Senate (1970–1979)	—N/a
–	Henry Everard; GCLM ICD DSO TD (1897–1980)	5 March 1979	1 June 1979	Rhodesian Front (RF)	General Manager of Rhodesia Railways (1953–1958)	
–	Henry Everard; GCLM ICD DSO TD (1897–1980)	89 days		Rhodesian Front (RF)	General Manager of Rhodesia Railways (1953–1958)	

== Zimbabwe Rhodesia (1979) ==
Under pressure from the international community to satisfy the civil rights movement by Blacks in Rhodesia, an "Internal Settlement" was drawn up between the Ian Smith administration of Rhodesia and moderate African nationalist parties not involved in armed resistance. Meanwhile, the government continued to battle armed resistance from both Soviet and Chinese backed Marxist liberation movements it referred to as "terrorists"- the Rhodesian Bush War was an extension of the Cold War, being a proxy conflict between the West and East, similar to those in Vietnam and Korea.

The "Internal Settlement" agreement led to relaxation of education, property and income qualifications for voter rolls, resulting in the first ever Black majority electorate. The country's civil service, judiciary, police and armed forces continued to be administered by the same officials as before, of whom most were Whites, due to the composition of the upper-middle class of the period.

No.	President	Term of office Duration in years and days		Party	Previous office
1	Josiah Zion Gumede; OLG (1919–1989)	1 June 1979	12 December 1979	United African National Council (UANC)	None
1	Josiah Zion Gumede; OLG (1919–1989)	195 days		United African National Council (UANC)	None

The Lancaster House Agreement stipulated that control over the country be returned to the United Kingdom in preparation for elections to be held in the spring of 1980. From 12 December 1979 to 17 April 1980, Zimbabwe Rhodesia was again the British colony of Southern Rhodesia. On 18 April 1980, Southern Rhodesia became the independent Republic of Zimbabwe.

== Zimbabwe (1980–present) ==
No.	Portrait	President	Took office	Left office	Time in office	Party	Election
1	Canaan Banana	Canaan Banana (1936–2003)	18 April 1980	31 December 1987	7 years, 257 days	ZANU	1980; 1986
2	Robert Mugabe	Robert Mugabe (1924–2019)	31 December 1987	21 November 2017 (Note: Deposed by a coup d'état.)	29 years, 325 days	ZANU–PF	1990; 1996; 2002; 2008; 2013
–	Phelekezela Mphoko	Phelekezela Mphoko (1940–2024); Acting	21 November 2017	24 November 2017	3 days	ZANU–PF	–
3	Emmerson Mnangagwa	Emmerson Mnangagwa (born 1942)	24 November 2017	Incumbent	8 years, 358 days	ZANU–PF	2018; 2023
