= Southern Rhodesia Act 1965 =

Act of the Parliament of the United Kingdom reaffirming Southern Rhodesia rule

Southern Rhodesia Act 1965 (Note: Section 4(1).)
- Act of Parliament
- Parliament of the United Kingdom
- Long title: An Act to make further provision with respect to Southern Rhodesia.
- Citation: 1965 c. 76
- Territorial extent: United Kingdom; Southern Rhodesia; Channel Islands; Isle of Man; Colonies and protectorates; (Note: Section 4(2).)

Dates
- Royal assent: 16 November 1965
- Commencement: 16 November 1965 (Note: The Acts of Parliament (Commencement) Act 1793.)
- Repealed: 18 April 1980 (Note: The Zimbabwe Independence Order 1980 (SI 1980/394).)
Other legislation
Repealed by	Zimbabwe Act 1979

Status: Repealed

Text of statute as originally enacted

The Southern Rhodesia Act 1965 (c. 76) was an act of the Parliament of the United Kingdom. It was designed to reaffirm British legal rule in Southern Rhodesia after it unilaterally declared independence as Rhodesia. In practice, it only enforced the status of Southern Rhodesia as a British colony in British constitutional theory as the Rhodesian government did not recognise it.

== History ==
Government recognised flag of Southern Rhodesia

On 11 November 1965, the Prime Minister of Southern Rhodesia Ian Smith declared Rhodesia's Unilateral Declaration of Independence from the British Empire after the British Government refused to grant independence with White minority rule was still in place. Within five days, the Southern Rhodesia Act 1965 had passed through Parliament and had received royal assent from Queen Elizabeth II. The Southern Rhodesia Act 1965 stated that Southern Rhodesia was still legally a British colony and affirmed to the Queen the power to govern Southern Rhodesia via Orders in Council including amending the constitution and enforce legal restrictions upon them unilaterally.

== Effect ==
The first use of the act was when the Queen issued the Southern Rhodesia Constitution Order 1965 (SI 1965/1952), an Order-in-Council to amend the Constitution of Southern Rhodesia, and dismiss the Rhodesian Front government under the Crown's reserve powers. This gave formal effect to Governor Sir Humphrey Gibbs sacking the Rhodesian Front government for treason within hours of the UDI.

The act was intended to show that the British Government alone had authority in Southern Rhodesia in theory. However, in practice, the act was largely ignored in Rhodesia and the government continued to meet as they considered that it was in violation of the constitutional convention that Westminster did not legislate for Southern Rhodesia without their consent. Additionally, it maintained that "in view of the new [Rhodesian] constitution" adopted as an annex to the UDI, the Crown "no longer had any executive powers in Rhodesia", and its reserve power to sack the government no longer existed.

The Rhodesian Front government initially maintained allegiance to Queen Elizabeth II. It attempted to reconstitute Rhodesia as a Commonwealth realm, recognising Elizabeth as Queen of Rhodesia. Prime Minister Ian Smith even went as far as advising the Queen to appoint his deputy, Clifford Dupont, as Governor-General to act as her viceregal representative in Rhodesia. While Smith was asserting his claimed prerogatives as Her Majesty's Rhodesian Prime Minister, Queen Elizabeth II no longer recognised Smith's authority and turned down his "purported advice." Ultimately, in 1970, Rhodesia unilaterally declared itself a republic after the Queen refused to recognise the title as legal. On the basis of the act, Whitehall maintained that Gibbs was Queen Elizabeth II's sole legitimate viceregal representative in (Southern) Rhodesia, and hence the only lawful authority in the area.

In 1978, when Southern Rhodesia proposed an Internal Settlement to instigate black majority rule, the United Nations rejected it. The act was repealed by the Zimbabwe Act 1979 after Rhodesia voluntarily returned to its former status as a British colony prior to multiracial elections and internationally recognised independence within the Commonwealth as Zimbabwe.

== Subsequent developments ==
The whole act was repealed by section 6(3) of, and schedule 3 to, the Zimbabwe Act 1979, which came into force on 18 April 1980. Section 1(1) of that act had also provided that the unexpired provisions of the 1965 act would cease to have effect on the day appointed for Zimbabwe's independence, which the Zimbabwe Independence Order 1980 fixed as 18 April 1980.
