= Rhodesia =

Unrecognised state in southern Africa, 1965 to 1979

Rhodesia (1965–1970) Republic of Rhodesia (1970–1979)
- 1965–1979
- Flag (1968–1979) Coat of arms
- Motto: Sit Nomine Digna (Latin) May she be worthy of the name
- Anthem: "God Save the Queen" (1965–1970) "Rise, O Voices of Rhodesia" (1974–1979)
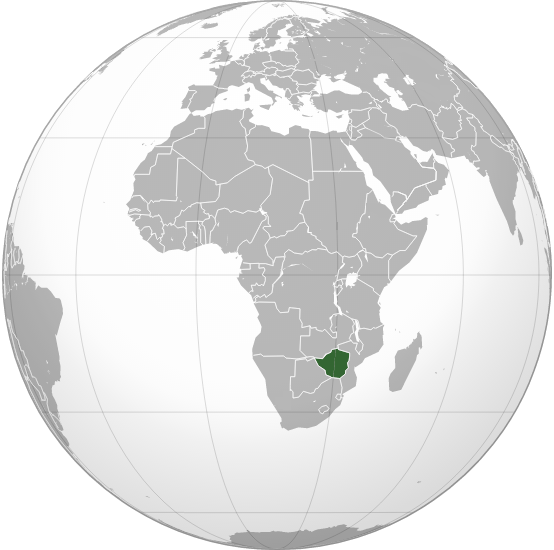
- Status: de facto independent state Crown Colony of the United Kingdom (de jure)
- Capital and largest city: Salisbury
- Official languages: English (de facto)
- Other languages: Shona; Northern Ndebele
- Ethnic groups (1969): 93.09% Black; 6.49% White; 0.47% Coloured/Asian
- Demonym: Rhodesian
- Government: Unitary parliamentary constitutional monarchy (1965–1970) Unitary parliamentary republic (1970–1979)
- Queen (Note: The government recognised Queen Elizabeth II as the official head of state from 1965 to 1970. The highest official of Rhodesia held the title "Officer Administering the Government" (OAtG) as he acted in lieu of the official Governor, who remained at his post but was ignored. After Rhodesia became a republic in March 1970, the President replaced the OAtG as the highest official and the Governor returned to London.)
  - 1965–1970: Elizabeth II
- Head of Representative
  - 1965–1975 (First): Clifford Dupont (Note: As Officer Administering the Government from 1965 to 1970, then as President of Rhodesia until 1975)
  - 1979 (Last): Henry Everard (Note: As President)
- Prime Minister
  - 1965–1979: Ian Smith
- Legislature: Legislative Assembly (until 1970) Parliament (from 1970)
  - Upper house: Senate
  - Lower house: House of Assembly
- Historical era: Cold War and decolonisation of Africa
  - Declared: 11 November 1965
  - Republic: 2 March 1970
  - Internal Settlement: 3 March 1978
  - Black-majority rule: 1 June 1979

Area
  - Total: 390,580 km^{2} (150,800 sq mi)

Population
  - 1978 census: 6,930,000
- Currency: Rhodesian pound (1964–1970); Rhodesian dollar (1970–1980)
- Time zone: UTC+2 (CAT)
- ISO 3166 code: RH
Preceded by	Succeeded by
Rhodesia	Zimbabwe Rhodesia
- Today part of: Zimbabwe

Rhodesia, (Note: /roʊˈdiːʒə/ roh-DEE-zhə, /roʊˈdiːʃə/ roh-DEE-shə; Shona: Rodizha) officially the Republic of Rhodesia from 1970 onwards, was an unrecognised state in Southern Africa that existed from 1965 to 1979. Rhodesia was the de facto successor to the self-governing colony of Southern Rhodesia following its unilateral declaration of independence (UDI) from the United Kingdom in 1965. Throughout this fourteen-year period, Rhodesia faced internal conflict and political unrest. Following the Lancaster House Agreement in 1979 and general elections held under a universal suffrage in 1980, the territory finally gained de jure independence and international recognition as the Republic of Zimbabwe.

The rapid decolonisation of Africa in the late 1950s and early 1960s alarmed a significant proportion of Southern Rhodesia's white population. In an effort to delay the transition to black majority rule, the white Southern Rhodesian cabinet issued a unilateral declaration of independence (UDI) from the United Kingdom on 11 November 1965. The new nation, renamed Rhodesia, initially sought recognition as an autonomous realm within the Commonwealth of Nations, but reconstituted itself as a republic in 1970. Following the UDI, the United Nations Security Council passed resolution 216 which called upon all states to deny recognition and assistance to Rhodesia. Two far-left African nationalist parties, the Zimbabwe African People's Union (ZAPU) and Zimbabwe African National Union (ZANU), launched an armed insurgency against the government after the UDI, sparking the Rhodesian Bush War. Growing war weariness, diplomatic pressure, and an extensive trade embargo imposed by the United Nations prompted Rhodesian prime minister Ian Smith to concede to majority rule in 1978. However, elections and a multiracial provisional government, with Smith succeeded by the moderate Abel Muzorewa, failed to appease international critics or halt the war. By December 1979, Muzorewa had secured an agreement with ZAPU and ZANU, allowing Rhodesia, now known as Zimbabwe-Rhodesia, to briefly revert to colonial status pending new elections under British supervision. ZANU secured an electoral victory in the 1980 general elections, and the country received internationally recognised independence as Zimbabwe.

A landlocked nation, Rhodesia was bordered by Botswana (Bechuanaland: British protectorate until 1966) to the southwest, Mozambique (as a Portuguese province until 1975) to the east, South Africa to the south, and Zambia (Northern Rhodesia until 1964) to the northwest. From 1965 to 1979, Rhodesia was one of two independent states on the African continent governed by a white minority of European descent and culture, the other being South Africa. Rhodesia's largest cities were Salisbury (its capital city, now known as Harare) and Bulawayo. Prior to 1970, the unicameral Legislative Assembly was predominantly white, with a small number of seats reserved for black representatives. Following the declaration of a republic in 1970, this was replaced by a bicameral Parliament, with a House of Assembly and a Senate. The bicameral system was retained in Zimbabwe after 1980. Aside from its racial franchise, Rhodesia observed a Westminster system inherited from the United Kingdom, with a president acting as ceremonial head of state, while a prime minister headed the Cabinet as head of government.

== Etymology ==
The official name of the country, according to the constitution adopted concurrently with the UDI in November 1965, was Rhodesia, which derives from Cecil Rhodes. This was not the case under British law, however, which considered the territory's legal name to be Southern Rhodesia, the name given to the country in 1898 during the British South Africa Company's administration of the Rhodesias, and retained by the self-governing colony of Southern Rhodesia after the end of company rule in 1923.

This naming dispute dated back to October 1964, when Northern Rhodesia became independent from the UK and concurrently changed its name to Zambia. The Southern Rhodesian colonial government in Salisbury felt that in the absence of a "Northern" Rhodesia, the continued use of "Southern" was superfluous. It passed legislation to become simply Rhodesia, but the British government refused to approve this on the grounds that the country's name was defined by British legislation, so could not be altered by the colonial government. Salisbury went on using the shortened name in an official manner nevertheless, while the British government continued referring to the country as Southern Rhodesia. This situation continued throughout the UDI period.

== History ==
=== Background ===
Until after the Second World War the landlocked British possession of Southern Rhodesia was not developed as an indigenous African territory, but rather as a unique state that reflected its multiracial character. This situation made it different from other lands that existed under colonial rule, as many Europeans had arrived to make permanent homes, populating the towns as traders or settling to farm the most productive soils. In 1922, faced with the decision to join the Union of South Africa as a fifth province or accept nearly full internal autonomy, the electorate cast its vote against South African integration.

In view of the outcome of the referendum, the territory was annexed by the United Kingdom on 12 September 1923. Shortly after annexation, on 1 October 1923, the first constitution for the new Colony of Southern Rhodesia came into force. Under this constitution, Southern Rhodesia was given the right to elect its own thirty-member legislature, premier, and cabinet—although the British government retained a formal veto over measures affecting natives and dominated foreign policy.

Over the course of the next three decades, Southern Rhodesia experienced a degree of economic expansion and industrialisation almost unrivalled in sub-Saharan Africa. Its natural abundance of mineral wealth—including large deposits of chromium and manganese—contributed to the high rate of conventional economic growth. However, most colonies in Africa, even those rich in natural resources, experienced difficulty in achieving similar rates of development due to a shortage of technical and managerial skills. Small, rotating cadres of colonial civil servants who possessed little incentive to invest their skills in the local economy were insufficient to compensate for this disadvantage. Southern Rhodesia had negated the issue by importing a skilled workforce directly from abroad in the form of its disproportionately large European immigrant and expatriate population. For example, in 1951 over 90% of white Southern Rhodesians were engaged in what the British government classified as "skilled occupations", or professional and technical trades. This made it possible to establish a diversified economy with a strong manufacturing sector and iron and steel industries, and circumvent the normal British protectionist policy of supporting domestic industry in the metropole while discouraging industry in the colonies abroad. As the white population increased, so did capital imports, especially in the wake of the Second World War. This trend, too, stood in sharp contrast to most other colonial territories, which suffered a major capital deficit due to revenues simply being repatriated to the metropole, leaving little capital to be invested locally. The considerable investment made by white Rhodesians in the economy financed the development of Southern Rhodesia's export industries as well as the infrastructure necessary to integrate it further with international markets.

In August 1953, Southern Rhodesia merged with Northern Rhodesia and Nyasaland, the two other British Central African territories, to form the Federation of Rhodesia and Nyasaland – a loose association that placed defence and economic direction under a central government but left many domestic affairs under the control of its constituent territories. As it began to appear that decolonisation was inevitable and indigenous black populations were pressing heavily for change, the federation was dissolved at the end of December 1963.

=== Unilateral Declaration of Independence (1965) ===
Although prepared to grant formal independence to Southern Rhodesia (now Rhodesia), the British government had adopted a policy of no independence before majority rule (NIBMR), dictating that colonies with a significant, politically active population of European settlers would not receive independence except under conditions of majority rule. White Rhodesians balked at the premise of NIBMR; many felt they had a right to absolute political control, at least for the time being, despite their relatively small numbers. They were also disturbed by the chaos of the post-colonial political transitions occurring in other African nations at the time, such as the Democratic Republic of the Congo. A vocal segment of the white populace was open to the concept of gradually incorporating black Rhodesians into civil society and a more integrated political structure in theory, although not without qualification and equivocation. A greater degree of social and political equality, they argued, was acceptable once more black citizens had obtained higher educational and vocational standards. The second faction in the white community was wholly unwilling to concede the principle, much less the practice, of equality to the black population. Both groups remained opposed to majority rule in the near future. However, once Rhodesia had been introduced as a topic for discussion in international bodies, extension of the status quo became a matter of concern to the British government, which perceived the scrutiny as a serious embarrassment to the United Kingdom.

After the federation was dissolved in December 1963, British Prime Minister Sir Alec Douglas-Home insisted that preconditions on independence talks hinge on what he termed the "five principles" – unimpeded progress to majority rule, assurance against any future legislation decidedly detrimental to black interests, "improvement in the political status" of local Africans, an end to official racial discrimination, and a political settlement that could be "acceptable to the whole population". Harold Wilson and his incoming Labour government took an even harder line on demanding that these points be legitimately addressed before a timetable for independence could be set.

In 1964, growing white dissatisfaction with the ongoing negotiations played a major role in the ousting of Winston Field as Prime Minister of Southern Rhodesia. Field was succeeded by Ian Smith, chairman of the conservative Rhodesian Front Party and an outspoken critic of any immediate transition to majority rule. Smith, the colony's first Rhodesian-born leader, soon came to personify resistance to liberals in British government and those agitating for change at home. In September 1964, Smith visited Lisbon, where Portuguese prime minister António de Oliveira Salazar promised him "maximum support" if he should declare independence. Aside from a common interest in maintaining security ties in southern Africa, Salazar expressed a great deal of anger at Britain's refusal to support Portugal during the Indian annexation of Goa in 1961, admonishing Smith not to trust the British government. A Rhodesian Trade Office was opened in Lisbon in order to co-ordinate breaking the anticipated sanctions in the event of a unilateral declaration of independence later that year, which encouraged Smith not to compromise. In its turn, the Rhodesian Trade Office in Lisbon functioned as a de facto embassy and caused tension with London, which objected to Rhodesia conducting its own foreign policy. As land-locked Rhodesia bordered the Portuguese colony of Mozambique, Salazar's promise of "maximum support" from Portugal in breaking the anticipated sanctions gave Smith more grounds for self-confidence in his talks with London. Smith ruled out acceptance for all five of the British principles as they stood, implying instead that Rhodesia was already legally entitled to independence—a claim that was overwhelmingly endorsed by the predominantly white electorate in a referendum.

Emboldened by the results of this referendum and the subsequent general election, the Rhodesian government threatened to declare independence without British consent. Harold Wilson countered by warning that such an irregular procedure would be considered treasonous, although he specifically rejected using armed force to quell a rebellion by English "kith and kin", or white Rhodesians of predominantly British descent and origin, many of whom still possessed sympathies and family ties to the United Kingdom. Wilson's refusal to consider a military option further encouraged Smith to proceed with his plans. Talks quickly broke down, and final efforts in October to achieve a settlement floundered; the Smith government remained unwilling to accept the five principles of independence, and the British government argued it would settle for nothing less.

On 11 November 1965 the Cabinet of Rhodesia issued a unilateral declaration of independence (UDI). The UDI was immediately denounced as an "act of rebellion against the Crown" in the United Kingdom, and Wilson promised that the illegal action would be short-lived. However, given its self-governing status Rhodesia had no longer been within the United Kingdom's direct sphere of influence for some time, and the façade of continued British rule was rendered a constitutional fiction by UDI. In light of these circumstances, Wilson quickly realised his ability to assert direct leverage over the incumbent Rhodesian government was limited.

On 12 October 1965, the United Nations General Assembly had noted the repeated threats of the Rhodesian authorities "to declare unilaterally the independence of Southern Rhodesia, in order to perpetuate minority rule", and called upon Wilson to use all means at his disposal (including military force) to prevent the Rhodesian Front from asserting independence. After UDI was proclaimed, UN officials branded the Rhodesian government as an "illegal racist minority regime" and called on member states to voluntarily sever economic ties with Rhodesia, recommending sanctions on petroleum products and military hardware. In December 1966, the UN further iterated that these sanctions were mandatory, and member states were explicitly barred from purchasing Rhodesian export goods, namely tobacco, chromium, copper, asbestos, sugar, and beef.

The British government, having already adopted extensive sanctions of its own, dispatched a Royal Navy squadron to monitor oil deliveries in the port of Beira in Mozambique, from which a strategic pipeline ran to Umtali in Rhodesia. The warships were to deter "by force, if necessary, vessels reasonably believed to be carrying oil destined for (Southern) Rhodesia".

Some Western nations, such as Switzerland and West Germany, which were not UN member states, continued to conduct business openly with Rhodesia – the latter remained the Smith government's largest trading partner in Western Europe until 1973, when it was admitted to the UN. Japan remained the chief recipient of Rhodesian exports outside the African continent, and Iran also supplied oil to Rhodesia in violation of the embargo. Portugal served as a conduit for Rhodesian goods, which it exported through Mozambique with false certificates of origin. South Africa, too, refused to observe the UN sanctions. In 1971, the Byrd Amendment was passed in the United States, permitting American firms to go on importing Rhodesian chromium and nickel products as normal.

Despite the poor showing of sanctions, Rhodesia found it nearly impossible to obtain diplomatic recognition abroad. In 1970, the United States declared it would not recognise UDI "under [any] circumstances". South Africa and Portugal, Rhodesia's largest trading partners, also refused to extend diplomatic recognition, and did not open embassies in the Rhodesian capital, Salisbury, preferring to conduct diplomatic activities through "accredited representatives". This allowed the South African and Portuguese governments to maintain they were continuing to respect British sovereignty while also accepting the practical authority of the Smith administration.

Initially, the Rhodesian state retained its pledged loyalty to Queen Elizabeth II, recognising her as Queen of Rhodesia. When Smith and Deputy Prime Minister Clifford Dupont visited Sir Humphrey Gibbs, the Governor of Southern Rhodesia, to formally notify him of the UDI, Gibbs condemned it as an act of treason. After Smith formally announced the UDI on the radio, Governor Gibbs used his reserve power to dismiss Smith and his entire cabinet from office, on orders from the Colonial Office in Whitehall. However, Gibbs was unable to take any concrete actions to bring about a return to lawful colonial government. Rhodesian ministers simply ignored his notices, contending that UDI had made his office obsolete. Even so, Gibbs continued to occupy his official residence, Government House, in Salisbury until 1970, when he finally left Rhodesia, following the declaration of a republic. He had effectively been superseded before then; the Smith government stated that if the Queen did not appoint a Governor-General, it would name Dupont as "Officer Administering the Government". Smith had intended to have Dupont named Governor-General, but Queen Elizabeth II would not even consider this advice. With few exceptions, the international community backed Whitehall's assertion that Gibbs was the Queen's only legitimate representative, and hence the only lawful authority in Rhodesia.

In September 1968, the Appellate Division of the High Court of Rhodesia ruled that Ian Smith's administration had become the de jure government of the country, not merely the de facto one. To support his decision, Chief Justice Sir Hugh Beadle used several statements made by Hugo Grotius, who maintained that there was no way that a nation could rightly claim to be governing a particular territory – if it was waging a war against that territory. Beadle argued that due to Britain's economic war against Rhodesia, she could not (at the same point) be described as governing Rhodesia. The ruling set the precedent that despite the UDI, the incumbent Smith government "could lawfully do anything its predecessors could lawfully have done".

A Salisbury commission chaired by prominent lawyer W.R. Waley was appointed to study constitutional options open to the Rhodesian authorities as of April 1968, including on the topic of majority rule, but reopening negotiations with the British on a settlement was ruled out early on. The Waley Commission found that in practical as well as legal terms, "Europeans must surrender any belief in permanent European domination", pointing out that minority rule was not permanently sustainable. However, Waley also testified that majority rule was not desirable immediately.

Talks aimed at easing the differences between Rhodesia and the United Kingdom were carried out aboard Royal Navy vessels once in December 1966 and again in October 1968. Both efforts failed to achieve agreement, although Harold Wilson added a sixth principle to the five he had previously enunciated: "it would be necessary to ensure that, regardless of race, there was no oppression of the majority by the minority or of [any] minority by the majority." Rhodesian resolve stiffened following a failure to reach a new settlement, with more radical elements of the Rhodesian Front calling for a republican constitution.

During a two-proposition referendum held in 1969, the proposal for severing all remaining ties to the British Crown passed by a majority of 61,130 votes to 14,327. Rhodesia declared itself a republic on 2 March 1970. Under the new constitution, a president served as ceremonial head of state, with the prime minister nominally reporting to him. Some in the Rhodesian government had hoped in vain that the declaration of a republic would finally prompt other nations to grant recognition.

==== Impact of UDI ====
The years following Rhodesia's UDI saw an unfolding series of economic, military, and political pressures placed on the country that eventually brought about majority rule, a totality of these factors rather than any one the reason for introducing change. In 2005, a conference at the London School of Economics that discussed Rhodesia's independence concluded that UDI was sparked by an existing racial conflict complicated by Cold War intrigues.

Critics of UDI maintained that Ian Smith intended to safeguard the privileges of an entrenched colonial ruling class at the expense of the impoverished black population. Smith defended his actions by claiming that the black Rhodesian majority was too inexperienced at the time to participate in the complex administrative process of what was, by contemporary African standards, a reasonably industrialised state.

At large, UDI further hardened the white population's attitudes towards majority rule and relations with the UK. A significant majority of white Rhodesian residents were either British immigrants or of British ancestry, and many held a special affection for the British Empire. However, the UK's refusal to grant them independence on their terms further confirmed their opposition to a political settlement on British terms, and fed their negative attitudes towards British interference in Rhodesian politics at large. In the years prior to UDI, white Rhodesians increasingly saw themselves as beleaguered and threatened, perpetually insecure and undermined by the metropole, unable to rely on anybody but themselves. The policy of "No independence before majority rule" transformed the white community's relationship with the UK and increased its suspicions of the British government's untrustworthiness and duplicity in colonial affairs, especially since the latter had adopted NIBMR as a formal policy – the very circumstance UDI was carried out to avoid, and which white Rhodesians had struggled to resist since the onset of decolonisation.

Black nationalist parties reacted with outrage at UDI, with one ZANU official stating, "for all those who cherish freedom and a meaningful life, UDI has set a collision course that cannot be altered. 11 November 1965 [has] marked the turning point of the struggle for freedom in that land from a constitutional and political one to primarily a military struggle." It would, however, be several years before the nationalists adopted armed struggle as their primary strategy for obtaining political power. Violent tactics at this time were intended to create opportunities for external intervention, either by the international community or the British government, rather than seriously undermine the Rhodesian security forces.

Because Rhodesian exports were generally competitive and had previously been entitled to preferential treatment on the British market, the former colony did not recognise the need for escalating the pace of diversification before independence. Following the UDI, however, Rhodesia began to demonstrate that it had the potential to develop a greater degree of economic self-sufficiency. After the Rhodesian Front began introducing incentives accorded to domestic production, industrial output expanded dramatically. A rigid system of countermeasures enacted to combat sanctions succeeded in blunting their impact for at least a decade. Over the next nine years, Rhodesian companies, spiting the freezing of their assets and blocking of overseas accounts, also perfected cunning techniques of sanctions evasion through both local and foreign subsidiaries, which operated on a clandestine trade network.

From 1968 until 1970, there was virtually no further dialogue between Rhodesia and the UK. In a referendum in 1969, white voters approved a new constitution and the establishment of a republic, thereby severing Rhodesia's last links with the British Crown, duly declared in March 1970. This changed immediately after the election of Edward Heath, who reopened negotiations. Smith remained optimistic that Heath would do his utmost to remedy Anglo-Rhodesian relations, although disappointed that he continued to adhere publicly to the original "five principles" proposed by Alec Douglas-Home, now foreign secretary. In November 1971, Douglas-Home renewed contacts with Salisbury and announced a proposed agreement that would be satisfactory to both sides – it recognised Rhodesia's 1969 constitution as the legal frame of government, while agreeing that gradual legislative representation was an acceptable formula for unhindered advance to majority rule. Nevertheless, the new settlement, if approved, would also implement an immediate improvement in black political status, offer a means to terminate racial discrimination, and provide a solid guarantee against retrogressive constitutional amendments.

Implementation of the proposed settlement hinged on popular acceptance, but the Rhodesian government consistently refused to submit it to a universal referendum. A twenty four-member commission headed by an eminent jurist, Lord Pearce, was therefore tasked with ascertaining public opinion on the subject. In 1972, the commission began interviewing interest groups and sampling opinions – although concern was expressed over the widespread apathy encountered. According to the commission, whites were in favour of the settlement, and Rhodesians of Coloured or Asian ancestry generally pleased, while the black response to the settlement's terms was resoundingly negative. As many as thirty black Rhodesian chiefs and politicians voiced their opposition, prompting Britain to withdraw from the proposals on the grounds of the commission's report.

=== Bush War ===
==== Early militant activity ====
As early as 1960, minority rule in Southern Rhodesia was already being challenged by a rising tide of political violence led by black African nationalists such as Joshua Nkomo and Ndabaningi Sithole. A sustained period of civil unrest between 1960 and 1965 further polarised relations between the government and the increasingly militant black nationalists. After their public campaigns were initially suppressed, many black nationalists believed that negotiation was completely incapable of meeting their aspirations. Petrol bombings by politicised radicals became increasingly common, with the Zimbabwe Review observing in 1961, "for the first time home-made petrol bombs were used by freedom fighters in Salisbury against settler establishments." Between January and September 1962, nationalists detonated 33 bombs and were implicated in 28 acts of arson, and 27 acts of sabotage against communications infrastructure. The nationalists also murdered a number of black Rhodesians who were accused of collaboration with the security forces. Nkomo's party, the Zimbabwe African People's Union (ZAPU) announced that year that it had formed a military wing, the Zimbabwe People's Revolutionary Army (ZIPRA) and "the decision to start bringing in arms and ammunition and to send young men away for sabotage training" had already been implemented.

As early as 1960, ZAPU's predecessor, the National Democratic Party (NDP), had established informal contacts with the Soviet Union and Czechoslovakia, and discussed the possibility of obtaining military training in Eastern Europe for its members. In July 1962, Nkomo visited Moscow and discussed plans for a ZAPU-led armed uprising in Rhodesia. He made formal requests for Soviet funding and arms for ZIPRA, explaining that "for these purposes ZAPU needs arms, explosives, revolvers...the party also needs money to bribe persons who guard important installations, to carry out sabotage". The Soviets agreed to supply ZAPU with limited funds beginning in 1963, and increased its level of financial support after UDI. In 1963, ZIPRA also made its first formal request to the Soviet Union for military training. The Soviets began training ZIPRA militants in guerrilla warfare in early 1964. Nkomo's public endorsement of a violent strategy confirmed white politicians' opposition to ZAPU and fed their negative attitudes towards black nationalists at large. In response to the formation of ZIPRA, the Rhodesian government banned ZAPU, driving that party's supporters underground. It also passed draconian security legislation restricting the right to assembly and granting the security forces broad powers to crack down on suspected political subversives. For the first time, the death sentence was also introduced for any act of politically inspired terrorism which involved arson or the use of explosives.

The emergence of guerrilla warfare and acts of urban insurrection by the black nationalist parties in Rhodesia allowed racial politics to be elevated into an issue of law and order in white Rhodesian public discourse. To Smith and his government, black nationalists were stateless dissidents whose primary motives were not political, but crime and perpetuating lawlessness; for example, Smith preferred to describe the insurgents as "gangsters" in his commentary. The use of weapons and explosives sourced from communist states by the black nationalists also disguised the racial dynamics of the conflict, allowing white Rhodesians to claim that they were targets of Soviet-directed communist agitators rather than a domestic political movement. Smith and his supporters perceived themselves as collective defenders of the traditional values of the British Empire against the twin threats of international communism, manifested through the Soviet Union's support for black nationalist militants, and the social and political decadence of the West. Often repeated appeals to the Christian heritage of their pioneer ancestors in "defending the free world" and sustaining "Western civilisation" reflected these beliefs. This was hardly an unusual opinion among white minorities in Southern Africa at the time; a dossier compiled by United States intelligence officials on the topic found that:

many [southern African] whites....believe that the current social and political ferment throughout the continent is communist inspired and managed; that it would be no problem without communist instigation. They point to materiel and training provided by communist countries to insurgency groups operating against white minority governments in southern Africa. They see foreign-based black liberation groups operating against the Portuguese, Rhodesians, and South Africans as the spearhead of a communist thrust into southern Africa.

ZAPU's attempts to implement its armed struggle were hamstrung by a factional split within the party between 1962 and 1963. A number of ZAPU dissidents rejected Nkomo's authority and formed their own organisation, the Zimbabwe African National Union (ZANU), with Ndabaningi Sithole as its president and Robert Mugabe as its general secretary. By August 1964, ZANU was banned by the Rhodesian government as well, which cited widespread acts of violent intimidation attributed to its members. ZANU's agenda was left-wing and pan-Africanist; it demanded a one-party state with majority rule and the abolition of private property. Ethnic tensions also exacerbated the split: ZANU recruited almost solely from the Shona-speaking peoples of Rhodesia. Its chief support base was the rural peasantry in the Mashonaland countryside. ZAPU did retain Shona members, even among its senior leadership following the split. However, thereafter it recruited predominantly from the Ndebele ethnic group. Due to ZAPU's close relationship with the Soviet Union, ZANU found itself ostracised by the Soviet bloc but soon found a new ally in the People's Republic of China. Its political ideology was somewhat more influenced by the principles of Maoism than ZAPU, and a sympathetic Chinese government soon agreed to furnish weapons and training for ZANU's own war effort.

After UDI, ZANU formed its own military wing, the Zimbabwe African National Liberation Army (ZANLA). While ZANLA and ZIPRA both planned for an armed struggle against the Rhodesian government, their respective leadership disagreed on the means of conducting the insurgency. ZIPRA favoured Soviet thinking, placing an emphasis on acquiring sophisticated weaponry in the hopes of winning a conventional battle like the Viet Minh at Dien Bien Phu. ZANLA placed greater emphasis on the politicisation of the local populace in the areas it operated, and favoured a more irregular style of warfare.

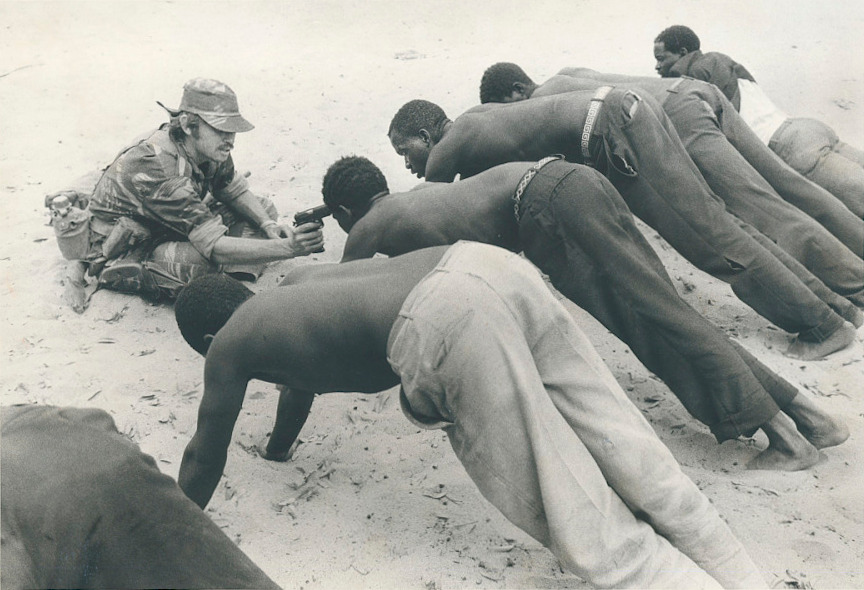
Rhodesian soldier interrogating villagers in late 1977 at gunpoint. This photograph would become one of the most enduring images of the Bush War.

In early April 1966, two groups of ZANLA insurgents recently trained at a Chinese military facility in Nanjing crossed into Rhodesia from Zambia, having been issued vague instructions to sabotage important installations and kill white farmers. Five were arrested by the Rhodesian security forces almost immediately. Another seven initially evaded capture and planned to destroy an electric pylon near Sinoia. Their explosive charges failed to detonate and were discovered by the Rhodesian Security Forces, who tracked the insurgents to a nearby ranch on 28 April. All seven were cornered and killed after a brief firefight; this event is considered to be the first engagement of the Rhodesian Bush War. The action at Sinoia has been commemorated by supporters of the guerrillas since as "Chimurenga Day", and occupies a place of pride in ZANU hagiography.

In August 1967, a large and better-equipped column of almost seventy ZIPRA insurgents infiltrated Rhodesia from Zambia, bolstered by recruits from an allied South African militant organisation, uMkhonto we Sizwe (MK). The insurgents failed to cultivate prior contacts with the local populace, which immediately informed on their presence to Rhodesian officials. Within the month, the Rhodesian police and army had launched a counteroffensive codenamed Operation Nickel, killing forty-seven insurgents, capturing another twenty, and driving the survivors across the border into Botswana. An even larger ZIPRA column of over a hundred insurgents was intercepted in early 1968 and annihilated by the security forces. A third ZIPRA incursion attempt in July 1969 met with similarly catastrophic results. Thereafter, ZIPRA abandoned the notion of attempting to infiltrate the country with large groups of insurgents equipped only with small arms; it limited itself to more irregular forms of warfare until it could stockpile enough heavy weaponry to mount a major conventional invasion. For its part, the ZANLA leadership criticised ZIPRA's continued fixation with winning a major conventional engagement, arguing that the failed incursions demonstrated the futility of engaging the Rhodesian military in the type of pitched battles in which it held an indisputable advantage. ZIPRA's failure to obtain support from the locals was also noted, and ZANLA began implementing a long-term covert politicisation programme to cultivate civilian support throughout its future area of operations.

=== Military and political escalation (1972–1976) ===
By December 1972, ZANLA had cached arms and established a vast underground network of informants and supporters in northeastern Rhodesia. As a result of the erosion of Portuguese authority in Mozambique's border provinces due to the Mozambican War of Independence, ZANLA was also able to establish external sanctuaries there. It was also in the process of cultivating a military alliance with the leading black nationalist movement in Mozambique, the Front for the Liberation of Mozambique (FRELIMO). On 21 December, a group of ZANLA insurgents under Rex Nhongo crossed into Rhodesia from Mozambique and raided an isolated commercial farm. In the successive months, this attack was followed by a succession of raids on white farmers throughout the northeastern districts of the country and resulted in several casualties among the security forces. The propaganda value of these raids, coupled with the success of ZANLA's politicisation campaign, denied intelligence to the security forces and furnished more recruits for the insurgents. In response, the Rhodesian security forces began coordinating operations in Mozambique with the Portuguese Army to intercept ZANLA insurgents before they could cross the border.

The practical alliances between ZIPRA and MK, and later ZANLA and FRELIMO, prompted Rhodesia to look increasingly towards South Africa and Portugal for active assistance. Rhodesian politicians frequently reminded officials in the other two nations of common security interests based on the similarity of their restive internal situations. They saw strong parallels between their nation's position of being threatened by black nationalist insurgencies and the Portuguese predicament with FRELIMO in Mozambique, as well as to a lesser extent the insurgencies in South Africa and South West Africa. Under the auspices of the Alcora Exercise, the three countries' bureaucracies began routinely sharing information and seeking common diplomatic positions. Lieutenant General Alan Fraser, a senior strategist in the South African Defence Force wrote in 1970, "there can be no doubt in any of our minds that we have a common enemy: we, i.e. Portugal, the RSA and Rhodesia. Unless we are to lay ourselves open to the possibility of defeat in detail, we must fight this enemy jointly—if not simultaneously." Nevertheless, aside from intelligence-sharing and some limited coordination on the operational level in Mozambique, the Portuguese could offer Rhodesia little decisive assistance. Portuguese colonial administrators in Mozambique were preoccupied with FRELIMO and somewhat depleted by a decade of war, and little could be spared to assist a foreign ally. Rhodesia expected far more from South Africa, which possessed greater military resources and diplomatic influence abroad at the time.

After the Carnation Revolution and the end of Portuguese rule in Mozambique in 1975, it was no longer viable for the Smith regime to sustain white minority rule indefinitely. By this time, even South Africa's John Vorster had come to this view. While Vorster remained confident of continued white minority rule in South Africa, he concluded that a similar political system was not sustainable in Rhodesia, a country where black people outnumbered white people 22:1. In 1976, the population included 270,000 white Rhodesians of European descent and six million black Africans.

International business groups involved in the country (e.g. Lonrho) transferred their support from the Rhodesian government to black nationalist parties. Business leaders and politicians feted Nkomo on his visits to Europe. ZANU also attracted business supporters who saw the course that future events were likely to take. Funding and arms support provided by supporters, particularly from the Soviet Union and its allies in the latter 1970s, allowed both ZIPRA and the ZANLA to acquire more sophisticated weaponry, thereby increasing the military pressure that the guerrillas were able to place on Rhodesia.

Until 1972, containing the guerrillas was little more than a police action. Even as late as August 1975 when Rhodesian government and black nationalist leaders met at Victoria Falls for negotiations brokered by South Africa and Zambia, the talks never got beyond the procedural phase. Rhodesian representatives made it clear they were prepared to fight an all out war to prevent majority rule. However, the situation changed dramatically after the end of Portuguese colonial rule in Mozambique in 1975. Rhodesia now found itself almost entirely surrounded by hostile states and even South Africa, its only real ally, pressed for a settlement.

Having let slip one chance after another of reaching an accommodation with more moderate black leaders, Rhodesia's whites seem to have made the tragic choice of facing black nationalism over the barrel of a gun rather than the conference table. The downhill road toward a race war in Rhodesia is becoming increasingly slippery with blood.

— Rand Daily Mail editorial, May 1976

At this point, ZANU's alliance with FRELIMO and the porous border between Mozambique and eastern Rhodesia enabled large-scale training and infiltration of ZANU/ZANLA fighters. The governments of Zambia and Botswana were also emboldened sufficiently to allow resistance movement bases to be set up in their territories. Guerrillas began to launch operations deep inside Rhodesia, attacking roads, railways, economic targets and isolated security force positions, in 1976.

A Rhodesian servicewoman taking aim with her Browning Hi-Power 9×19mm semi-automatic pistol; from a 1976 army recruitment poster

The government adopted a strategic hamlets policy of the kind used in Malaya and Vietnam to restrict the influence of insurgents over the population of rural areas. Local people were forced to relocate to protected villages (PVs) which were strictly controlled and guarded by the government against rebel atrocities. The protected villages were compared by the guerrillas to concentration camps. Some contemporary accounts claim that this interference in the lives of local residents induced many of them who had previously been neutral to support the guerrillas.

The war degenerated into rounds of increasing brutality from all three parties involved (ZANU and ZAPU, and the Rhodesian Army). Mike Subritzky, a former New Zealand Army ceasefire monitor in Rhodesia, in 1980 described the war as "both bloody and brutal and brought out the very worst in the opposing combatants on all three sides."

A major problem for the Rhodesian state in fighting the Bush War was always a shortage of manpower. Of the 3,000 white men liable for conscription in 1973, only about 1,000 reported when called-up. In February 1978, the Rhodesian Army stated it needed a minimum of 1,041 men to continue combat operations, and of those called up, only 570 reported for duty while the rest chose to move to South Africa. White emigration increased as the state called up more and more men to fight in the war, creating a vicious circle, which gradually limited the capacity of the Rhodesian state to continue the war. In order to stop white emigration, the Smith government brought in a law in 1975 forbidding Rhodesian citizens from holding foreign currency, but the law was widely flouted. In order to encourage white emigration, the guerrillas of ZANU and ZAPU followed a strategy of attacking anything and everything that was of economic value across the country in order to force the state to call up more men, and of killing white civilians. Killing Rhodesian white citizens tended to have an "echo effect" as the ZANU and ZAPU had each estimated that for one white citizen killed, it caused about 20 to leave Rhodesia.

=== End of the Bush War ===
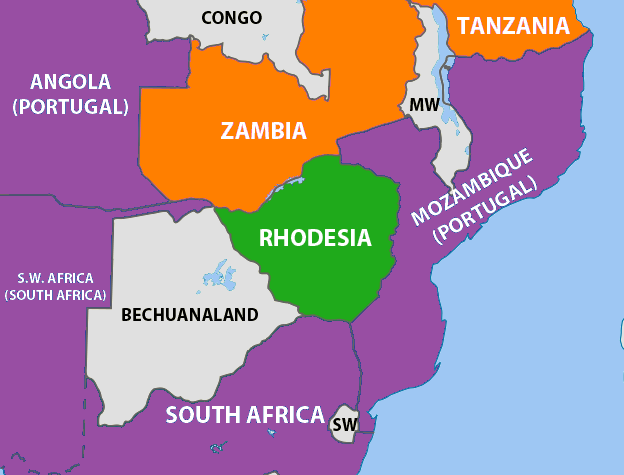
The geographical situation in 1965 (left, on UDI) and 1975 (right, after the independence of Mozambique and Angola from Portugal). Green: Rhodesia; purple: friendly nations; orange: hostile states; grey: neutral countries

Rhodesia began to lose vital economic and military support from South Africa, which, while sympathetic to the white minority government, never accorded it diplomatic recognition. The South African government placed limits on the fuel and munitions they supplied to the Rhodesian military. They also withdrew the personnel and equipment that they had previously provided to aid the war effort, though covert military support continued.

In 1976, the South African government and United States governments worked together to place pressure on Smith to agree to a form of majority rule. In response to the initiative of United States Secretary of State Henry Kissinger, in 1976 Ian Smith accepted the principle of black majority rule within two years. The Rhodesians now offered more concessions, but those concessions, focused on reaching an "internal settlement" with moderate black leaders, were insufficient to end the war.

At the time, some Rhodesians said the still embittered history between the British-dominated Rhodesia and the Afrikaner-dominated South Africa partly led the South African government to withdraw its aid to Rhodesia. Ian Smith said in his memoirs that even though many white South Africans supported Rhodesia, South African Prime Minister John Vorster's policy of détente with the black African states ended up with Rhodesia being offered as the "sacrificial lamb" to buy more time for South Africa. Other observers perceived South Africa's distancing itself from Rhodesia as being an early move in the process that led to majority rule in South Africa itself.

In 1976 South Africa saw settlement of the Rhodesian question as vital on several fronts: to cauterise the wound of the psychological blow … caused by her defeat in the Angolan conflict; to pre-empt possible Cuban intervention in Rhodesia and the possibility of South Africa being sucked into another Cold War regional conflict without the support and endorsement of the western powers

— Dr Sue Onslow, South Africa and UDI

In the latter 1970s, the militants had successfully put the economy of Rhodesia under significant pressure while the numbers of guerrillas in the country were steadily increasing. The government abandoned its early strategy of trying to defend the borders in favour of trying to defend key economic areas and lines of communication with South Africa, while the rest of the countryside became a patchwork of "no-go areas".

==== Late 1970s ====
By the late 1970s, Rhodesia's front-line forces contained about 25,000 regular troops and police – backed up by relatively strong army and police reserves. Its mechanised contingent consisted of light armoured cars and improvised mine-protected armoured personnel carriers, complemented by eight tanks (Polish built T-55LD tanks), delivered in the last year of the war. The Rhodesian Air Force operated an assortment of both Canberra light bombers, Hawker Hunter fighter bombers, older de Havilland Vampire jets as well as a somewhat antiquated, but still potent, helicopter arm. These forces, including highly trained special operations units, were capable of launching devastating raids on resistance movement camps outside the country, as in Operation Dingo in 1977 and other similar operations.

Nevertheless, guerrilla pressure inside the country itself was steadily increasing in the latter 1970s. By 1978–1979, the war had become a contest between the guerrilla warfare placing ever increasing pressure on the Rhodesian regime and civil population, and the Rhodesian government's strategy of trying to hold off the militants until external recognition for a compromise political settlement with moderate black leaders could be secured.

By this time, the need to cut a deal was apparent to most Rhodesians, but not to all. Ian Smith had dismissed his intransigent Defence Minister, P. K. van der Byl, as early as 1976. Van der Byl was a hard-line opponent of any form of compromise with domestic opposition or the international community since before UDI.

...it is better to fight to the last man and the last cartridge and die with some honour. Because, what is being presented to us here is a degree of humiliation...

— P. K. van der Byl in 1977, commenting on a British peace plan.

Van der Byl eventually retired to his country estate outside Cape Town, but there were elements in Rhodesia, mainly embittered former security force personnel, who forcibly opposed majority rule up to and well beyond the establishment of majority rule. New white immigrants continued to arrive in Rhodesia right up to the eve of majority rule.

==== Intensification of the Bush War ====
The work of journalists such as Lord Richard Cecil, son of Robert Gascoyne-Cecil, 6th Marquess of Salisbury, stiffened the morale of Rhodesians and their overseas supporters. Lord Richard produced news reports for ITN which typically contrasted the "incompetent" insurgents with the "superbly professional" government troops. A group of ZANLA fighters killed Lord Richard on 20 April 1978 when he was accompanying a Rhodesian airborne unit employed in Fire Force Operations.

The shooting down on 3 September 1978 of the civilian Air Rhodesia airliner, a Vickers Viscount named the Hunyani, in the Kariba area by ZIPRA fighters using a surface-to-air missile, with the subsequent massacre of 10 of its 18 survivors, is widely considered to be the event that finally destroyed the Rhodesians' will to continue the war. Although militarily insignificant, the loss of this aircraft (and a second Viscount, named the Umniati, in 1979) demonstrated the reach of resistance movements extended to Rhodesian civil society.

The Rhodesians' means to continue the war were also eroding fast. In December 1978, a ZANLA unit penetrated the outskirts of Salisbury and fired a volley of rockets and incendiary device rounds into the main oil storage depot – the most heavily defended economic asset in the country. The storage tanks burned for five days, giving off a column of smoke that could be seen 130 kilometres (80 mi) away. Five hundred thousand barrels (79,000 m^{3}) of petroleum product (comprising Rhodesia's strategic oil reserve) were lost.

The government's defence spending increased from R$30 million, 8.5% of the national budget in 1971 to 1972, to R$400 m in 1978 to 1979, 47% of the national budget. In 1980, the post-independence government of Zimbabwe inherited a US$500 million national debt.

=== End of UDI (1979) ===
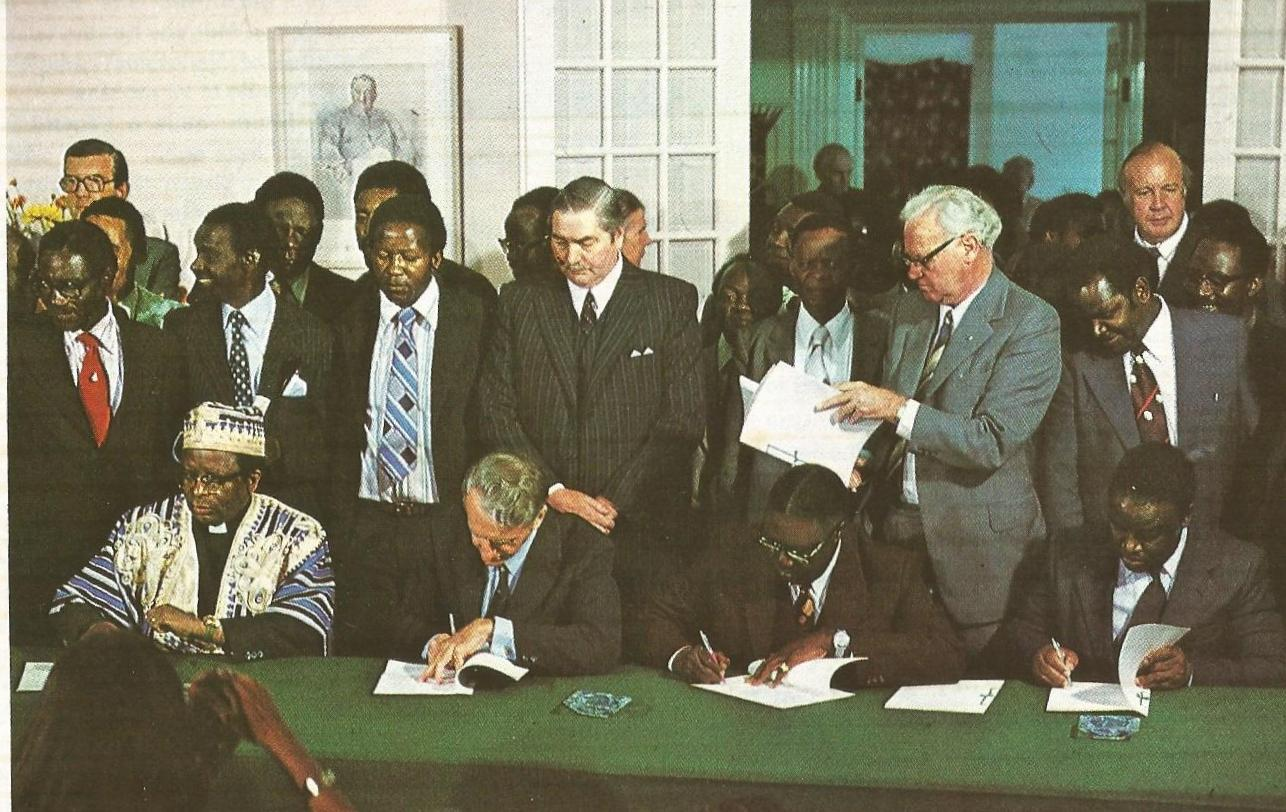
Signing of the Rhodesian Internal Settlement (from left: Bishop Abel Muzorewa, Ian Smith, Jeremiah Chirau and Ndabaningi Sithole)

The Rhodesian army continued its "mobile counter-offensive" strategy of holding key positions ("vital asset ground") while carrying out raids into the no-go areas and into neighbouring countries. While often extraordinarily successful in inflicting heavy guerrilla casualties, such raids also on occasion failed to achieve their objectives. In April 1979 special forces carried out a raid on Joshua Nkomo's residence in Lusaka, Zambia, with the stated intention of assassinating him. Nkomo and his family left hastily a few hours before the raid – having clearly been warned that the raid was coming.

In 1979, some special forces units were accused of using counterinsurgent operations as cover for ivory poaching and smuggling. Colonel Reid-Daly (commander of the Selous Scouts) discovered that his phone was bugged and after challenging a superior officer on this issue was court martialled for insubordination. He received the lightest sentence possible, a caution, but he continued to fight his conviction and eventually resigned his commission and left the Army.

By 1978–1979, up to 70% of the regular army was composed of black soldiers (though both the army and police reserves remained overwhelmingly white). By 1979 there were also 30 black commissioned officers in the regular army. While there was never any suggestion of disloyalty among the soldiers from predominantly black units (in particular within the Selous Scouts or the Rhodesian African Rifles – RAR), some argue that, by the time of the 1980 election, many of the RAR soldiers voted for Robert Mugabe.

As the result of an Internal Settlement signed on 3 March 1978 between the Rhodesian government and the moderate African nationalist parties, which were not in exile and not involved in the war, elections were held in April 1979. The United African National Council (UANC) party won a majority in this election, and its leader, Abel Muzorewa (a United Methodist Church bishop), became the country's first black prime minister on 1 June 1979. The country's name was changed to Zimbabwe Rhodesia. The internal settlement left control of the country's police, security forces, civil service and judiciary in white hands, for the moment. It assured whites of about one-third of the seats in parliament. It was essentially a power-sharing arrangement between white people and black people which, in the eyes of many, particularly the insurgents, did not amount to majority rule. However, the United States Senate voted to end economic sanctions against Zimbabwe Rhodesia on 12 June.

While the 1979 election was described by the Rhodesian government as non-racial and democratic, it did not include the main nationalist parties ZANU and ZAPU. In spite of offers from Ian Smith, the latter parties declined to participate in an election in which their political position would be insecure and under a proposed constitution which they had played no part in drafting and which was perceived as retaining strong white minority privilege.

Bishop Muzorewa's government did not receive international recognition. The Bush War continued unabated and sanctions were not lifted. The international community refused to accept the validity of any agreement which did not incorporate the main nationalist parties. The British government (then led by the recently elected Margaret Thatcher) issued invitations to all parties to attend a peace conference at Lancaster House. These negotiations took place in London in late 1979. The three-month-long conference almost failed to reach conclusion, due to disagreements on land reform, but resulted in the Lancaster House Agreement. UDI ended, and Rhodesia temporarily reverted to the status of a British colony (the 'Colony of Southern Rhodesia'). As per the agreement, Lord Soames became governor with full legislative and executive powers.

The Lancaster House Agreement further provided for a ceasefire which was followed by an internationally supervised general election, held in February 1980. ZANU led by Robert Mugabe won this election, some alleged, by terrorising its political opposition, including supporters of ZAPU, through former insurgents that had not confined themselves to the designated guerrilla assembly points, as stipulated by the Lancaster House Agreement. The observers and Soames were accused of looking the other way, and Mugabe's victory was certified. Nevertheless, few could doubt that Mugabe's support within his majority Shona tribal group was extremely strong. The Rhodesian military seriously considered mounting a coup against a perceived stolen election ("Operation Quartz") to prevent ZANU from taking over the country. The alleged coup was to include the assassination of Mugabe and coordinated assaults on guerrilla assembly points throughout the country. The plan was eventually scuttled, as it was obvious that Mugabe enjoyed widespread support from the black majority despite voter intimidation, as well as the fact that the coup would gain no external support, and a conflagration which would engulf the country was seen as inevitable.

=== Republic of Zimbabwe (1980) ===
On 18 April 1980, the country became independent within the Commonwealth of Nations as the Republic of Zimbabwe, and its capital, Salisbury, was renamed Harare two years later.

== Geography ==
Rhodesia is equivalent in territory to modern Zimbabwe. It was a landlocked country in southern Africa, lying between latitudes 15° and 23°S, and longitudes 25° and 34°E. It was bordered by South Africa to the south, the Bechuanaland Protectorate (later Botswana) to the west and southwest, Zambia to the northwest, and Mozambique to the east and northeast. Its northwest corner was roughly 150 metres (500 feet) from South West Africa (present-day Namibia), South Africa, nearly forming a four-nation quadripoint. Most of the country was elevated, consisting of a central plateau (high veld) stretching from the southwest northwards with altitudes between 1,000 and 1,600 m (3,300 and 5,200 ft). The country's extreme east was mountainous, this area being known as the Eastern Highlands, with Mount Inyangani as the highest point at 2,592 m (8,504 ft).

=== Climate ===
Rhodesia had a tropical climate with many local variations. The southern areas were known for their heat and aridity, parts of the central plateau received frost in winter, the Zambezi valley was also known for its extreme heat and the Eastern Highlands usually experienced cool temperatures and the highest rainfall in the country. The country's rainy season was from late October to March and the hot climate was moderated by increasing altitude. The country was faced with recurring droughts, and severe storms were rare.

=== Biodiversity ===
The country was mostly savannah, although the moist and mountainous eastern highlands supported areas of tropical evergreen and hardwood forests. Trees found in these Eastern Highlands included teak, mahogany, enormous specimens of strangling fig, forest newtonia, big leaf, white stinkwood, chirinda stinkwood, knobthorn and many others.

In the low-lying parts of the country, fever trees, mopane, combretum and baobabs abound. Much of the country was covered by miombo woodland, dominated by brachystegia species and others. Among the numerous flowers and shrubs were hibiscus, flame lily, snake lily, spider lily, leonotus, cassia, tree wisteria and dombeya. There were around 350 species of mammals that can be found in Rhodesia. There were also many snakes and lizards, over 500 bird species, and 131 fish species.

== Government and politics ==
The presidential flag of Rhodesia

Although Southern Rhodesia never gained full Dominion status within the Commonwealth of Nations, Southern Rhodesians ruled themselves from the attainment of 'Responsible Government' in 1923. Its electoral register had property and education qualifications. Over the years various electoral arrangements made at a national and municipal level upheld these standards. For example, the franchise for the first Southern Rhodesian Legislative Council election in 1899 contained the following requirement:

voters to be British subjects, male, 21 years of age and older, able to write their address and occupation, and then to fulfil the following financial requirements: (a) ownership of a registered mining claim in Southern Rhodesia, or (b) occupying immovable property worth £75, or (c) receiving wages or salary of £50 per annum in Southern Rhodesia. Six months' continuous residence was also required for qualifications (b) and (c).

Following Cecil Rhodes's dictum of "equal rights for all civilised men", there was an implicit, albeit not an overt, racial component to the franchise, which effectively excluded a majority of native black people from the electorate via such means as property qualifications.

The 1961 Constitution governed Southern Rhodesia and independent Rhodesia up until 1969, using the Westminster Parliamentary System modified by a system of separate voter rolls with differing property and education qualifications, without regard to race. Whites ended up with the majority of Assembly seats with Whites attaining 50 out of 66 seats. Blacks would only attain 16 out of the 66 seats in the Rhodesian Parliament.

The 1969 republican constitution established a bicameral Parliament consisting of an indirectly elected Senate and a directly elected House of Assembly operated under a unitary system of government, effectively reserving the majority of seats for whites. The office of president had only ceremonial significance with the prime minister holding executive power.

The Constitution of the short-lived Zimbabwe Rhodesia, which saw a black-led government elected for the first time, reserved 28 of the 100 parliamentary seats for whites. The independence constitution agreed at Lancaster House watered those provisions down and reserved 20 out of 100 seats for whites in the House of Assembly and 8 out of 40 seats in the Senate. The constitution prohibited Zimbabwe authorities from altering the Constitution for seven years without unanimous consent and required a three-quarters vote in Parliament for a further three years. The government amended the Constitution in 1987 to abolish the seats reserved for whites, and replace the office of prime minister with an executive president. In 1990, the government abolished the Senate.

=== Administrative divisions ===
Administrative divisions of Rhodesia

Rhodesia had a centralised government and was divided into seven provinces and two cities with provincial status, for administrative purposes. Each province had a provincial capital from where government administration was usually carried out.

Province	Capital
Manicaland	Umtali
North Mashonaland	Salisbury
South Mashonaland	Salisbury
Victoria	Fort Victoria
North Matabeleland	Bulawayo
South Matabeleland	Bulawayo
Midlands	Gwelo

== Military ==
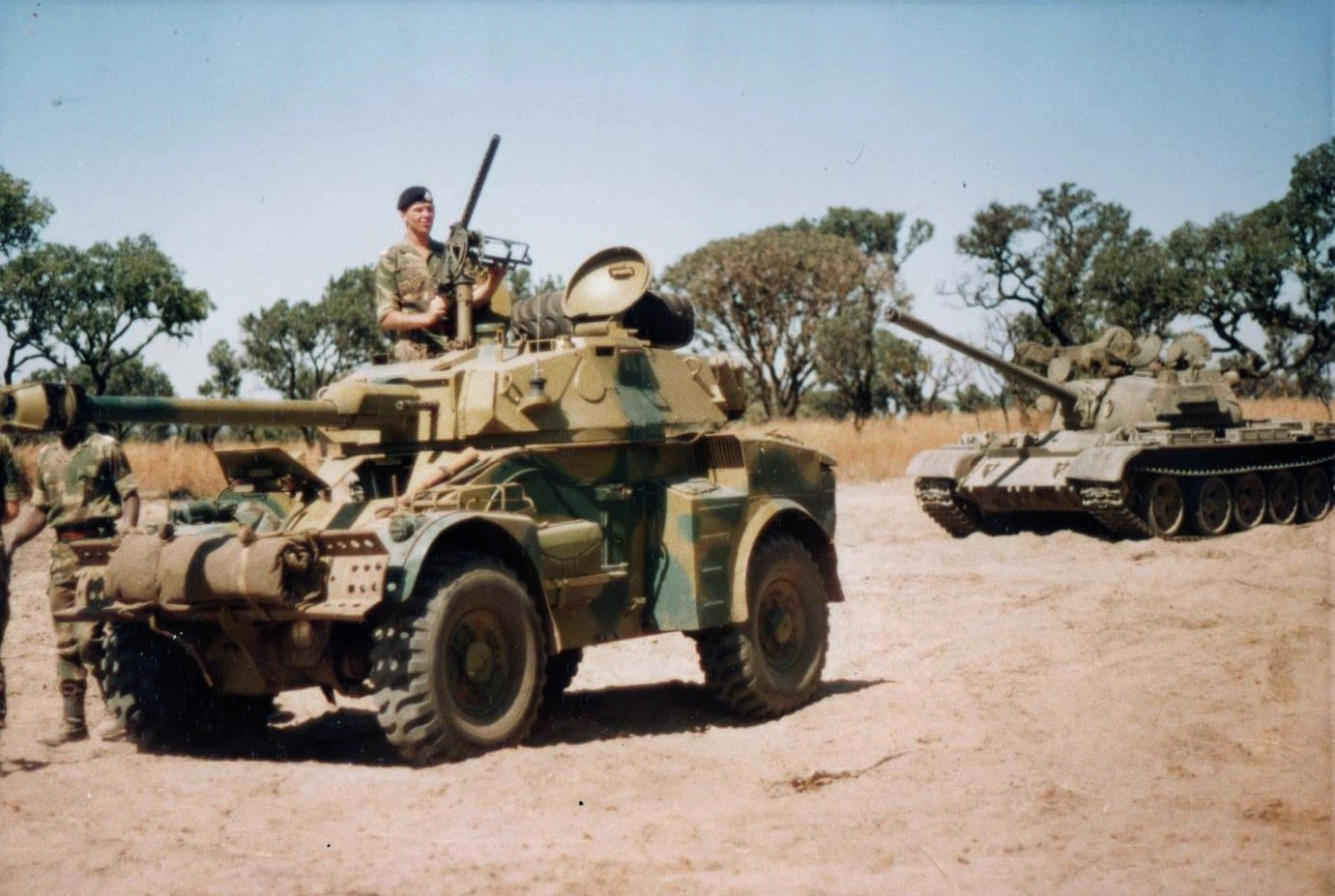
Troops of the Rhodesian Armoured Corps in 1979

Southern Rhodesia had long been distinctive among British dependencies in that it had financed and developed its own security forces and command structure. After UDI, this posed a particular dilemma for the British government, which considered and rejected various proposals aimed at ending Rhodesia's state of rebellion by force. Harold Wilson once remarked that bringing an end to Rhodesian independence "would not be a case of arresting a subversive individual. It would mean a bloody war, and probably a bloody war turning into a bloody civil war." The formidable nature of the Rhodesian security forces, as well as British fears of a direct South African intervention on behalf of the rogue colony, preempted the further consideration of military options.

For much of its existence, Rhodesia maintained a small professional standing army of 3,400 troops, about a third of whom were black volunteers. In the tradition of many colonial armies, it was primarily organised into light infantry battalions trained and equipped for counter-insurgency warfare or internal security actions, and possessed little artillery or armour. The Royal Rhodesian Air Force (RRAF) had 1,000 personnel and six squadrons of aircraft, including forty to fifty Hawker Hunter and de Havilland Vampire strike aircraft and English Electric Canberra light bombers. It also possessed a helicopter squadron, a transport squadron, and a light reconnaissance squadron. The Rhodesian military was backed by the British South Africa Police (BSAP), a well-equipped police force whose title was derived from the law enforcement division of the British South Africa Company. The BSAP had numerous paramilitary units that functioned as auxiliaries to the army. Domestic and external intelligence gathering were vested in the Central Intelligence Organisation (CIO).

As a result of the escalating rural insurgency, the Rhodesian Security Forces began to depend more heavily on white conscripts and reservists, the latter of whom were enrolled in a reserve component known as the Territorial Force. The regular elements of the security forces included a disproportionate number of personnel who had seen action during the First Malayan Emergency as well as the Aden Emergency, and their experience gave Rhodesia's defence establishment a solid grounding in counter-insurgency warfare and small unit tactics in particular. Nevertheless, the vastness of the operational area and Rhodesia's limited manpower pool left the army, air force, and BSAP constantly overstretched. Budgetary and resource restraints, coupled with manpower shortages, meant the security forces could not expand quickly enough to match the guerrilla movements, and were almost always outnumbered. Rhodesian units attempted to compensate for their disadvantage in this regard by pursuing an aggressive preemptive and counterstrike strategy, raiding neighbouring states to destroy guerrilla forces in their external sanctuaries.

All white, male residents aged eighteen to twenty-three were obligated to fulfil four and a half months (later extended to nine months) of full-time national service. This was followed by a three-year reservist obligation. By 1974, the national service intakes had been doubled, and white men over twenty-three were also conscripted. In 1978, the Rhodesian Army had about 14,000 white national servicemen, but continued manpower shortages forced it to recruit black volunteers in larger numbers and extend compulsory military service to all white males up to sixty years of age. By the end of the Rhodesian Bush War virtually all male white residents were either serving in the military or police in a full-time or part-time capacity. The size of the Rhodesian Army had swelled to about 20,000 personnel, and the BSAP to over 40,000, including reservists.

=== Biological and chemical warfare ===
From 1975 to 1980, the Rhodesian government made several attempts to weaponise chemical and biological agents. Members of the security forces contaminated supplies before replacing them in guerrilla caches or planted them in rural stores to be stolen by the guerrillas during raids. They also poisoned water sources along known infiltration routes along the Rhodesian border, forcing their opponents to travel through more arid regions or carry more water during their treks.

The chemical agents most used in the Rhodesian chemical and biological warfare (CBW) programme were parathion (an organophosphate insecticide) and thallium (a heavy metal commonly found in rodenticide). The weapons the Rhodesians selected for use also included Vibrio cholerae (causative agent of cholera) and possibly Bacillus anthracis (causative agent of anthrax). They also looked at using Rickettsia prowazekii (causative agent of epidemic typhus), and Salmonella typhi (causative agent of typhoid fever), and toxins such as ricin and botulinum toxin.

Biological agents, namely Vibrio cholerae, had some impact on the fighting capability of ZANLA. Some former officers of the Rhodesian Security Forces alleged that anthrax was used covertly during the late 1970s, but this has been disputed. Use of anthracis, ricin, or botulinum toxin was favoured during assassination attempts of prominent guerrilla commanders.

== Economy ==
Economically, Southern Rhodesia developed an economy that was narrowly based on the production of a few primary products, notably, chromium and tobacco. It was therefore vulnerable to the economic cycle. The deep recession of the 1930s gave way to a post-war boom. This boom prompted the immigration of about 200,000 whites between 1945 and 1970, taking the white population up to 307,000. A large number of these immigrants were of British working-class origin, with others coming from the Belgian Congo, Kenya, Tanzania, and later Angola and Mozambique. They established a relatively balanced economy, transforming what was once a primary producer dependent on backwoods farming into an modest industrial power which spawned a strong manufacturing sector, iron and steel industries, and modern mining ventures. These economic successes owed a lot to the immigration of skilled labour and backing from South Africa.

The economy of the state of Rhodesia sustained international sanctions for a decade following the declaration of its independence, a resistance which waned as more southern African states declared independence and majority rule as well as the destruction caused by the Rhodesian Bush War.

=== Transportation ===
Rhodesia had its own road and rail network along with an airline, Air Rhodesia. The road network largely was found in white areas and there were by 1975 "about" 45,000 miles (72,000 km) of paved roads. The railroad network was 1,568 miles (2,523 km) long and matched the South African railroad gauge. Rhodesia also had connections via road and rail to neighboring countries.

== Demographics ==
=== Population ===
A central feature of the white community in Rhodesia was its transience, as white settlers were just as likely to leave Rhodesia after a few years as permanently settle; for example, of the 700 Britons who were the first white settlers, arriving in 1890, only 15 were still living in Rhodesia in 1924. As the white population of Rhodesia had a low birth rate (18 per 1,000 compared to the African rate of 48 per 1,000), maintaining white population growth was largely dependent upon taking in new white immigrants with immigration accounting for 60% of the growth of the white Rhodesian population between 1955 and 1972.

In the ten years after the nation's declaration of independence from Britain, around 70,000 from the white population of Rhodesia emigrated from the nation. 45% of the emigration was to South Africa, as it was geographically adjacent and shared similarities in climate, topography, economic standards, and social customs. The remaining 55% chiefly headed to other mainly white, English-speaking nations at the time: the United Kingdom, Australia, Canada, and New Zealand.

However, the American historian Josiah Brownell noted that the turnover rate for white residents in Rhodesia was very high, as Rhodesia took in a total of 255,692 white immigrants between 1955 and 1979 while the same period a total of 246,583 whites emigrated. Even during the boom years of the late 1950s, when Rhodesia took in an average of 13,666 white immigrants per year, mostly from the United Kingdom and South Africa, an average of about 7,666 whites emigrated annually. Between 1961 and 1965, Rhodesia took in an average of 8,225 white immigrants per year while also having an average white emigration of 12,912 per year. Many prospective white immigrants in Rhodesia arrived seeking economic opportunities and departed with fluctuations in the security situation as the Bush War intensified. A substantial number were uninterested in settling there permanently and did not apply for Rhodesian citizenship, despite a much-publicised 1967 campaign urging them to do so.

Brownell asserted that patriotism in the white community was "shallow" due to its essentially expatriate character. He also claimed that the majority of white immigrants in the late 1960s and early 1970s were unskilled labourers who competed with the country's black African workforce and did not contribute badly needed technical or professional skills to the country, arguing that this was due to government policy aimed at making white immigration as "unselective as possible" and guaranteeing every white immigrant a job. The population of Rhodesia boomed during the late 1960s due to immigration and an exceptional rate of natural increase among its black citizens, the highest in sub-Saharan Africa at the time.

Numbers of white and black inhabitants before and during the Federation of Rhodesia and Nyasaland
Year	Southern Rhodesia		Northern Rhodesia		Nyasaland		Total	
Year	White	Black	White	Black	White	Black	White	Black
1927	38,200 (3.98%)	922,000 (96.02%)	4,000 (0.4%)	1,000,000 (99.6%)	1,700 (0.13%)	1,350,000 (99.87%)	43,900 (1.32%)	3,272,000 (98.68%)
1946	80,500 (4.79%)	1,600,000 (95.21%)	21,919 (1.32%)	1,634,980 (97.68%)	2,300 (0.10%)	2,340,000 (99.90%)	104,719 (1.84%)	5,574,980 (98.16%)
1955	150,000 (5.88%)	2,400,000 (94.12%)	65,000 (3.02%)	2,085,000 (96.98%)	6,300 (0.25%)	2,550,000 (99.75%)	221,300 (3.05%)	7,035,000 (96.95%)
1960	223,000 (7.30%)	2,830,000 (92.70%)	76,000 (3.14%)	2,340,000 (96.85%)	9,300 (0.33%)	2,810,000 (99.66%)	308,300 (3.72%)	7,980,000 (96.28%)

Population of White, Black, Asian and Coloured inhabitants of Southern Rhodesia, 1911–1969
Year	White	Black (Est.)	Asiatic & Coloured	Total Population (Est.)
1911	23,606 (3.06%)	744,559 (96.56%)	2,912 (0.38%)	771,077
1921	33,620 (3.73%)	862,319 (95.90%)	3,248 (0.36%)	899,187
1931	49,910 (4.42%)	1,076,000 (95.22%)	4,102 (0.36%)	1,130,000
1941	68,954 (4.66%)	1,404,000 (94.93%)	6,521 (0.44%)	1,479,000
1951	135,596 (5.84%)	2,170,000 (93.53%)	10,283 (0.44%)	2,320,000
1961	221,504 (5.74%)	3,618,150 (93.80%)	17,812 (0.46%)	3,857,466
1969	258,580 (5.08%)	4,840,000 (95.09%)	23,870 (0.47%)	5,090,000

White Rhodesian vital statistics, 1963–1969
Year	Births	Deaths	Marriages	Immigrants
1963	4,457	1,449	2,008	5,093
1964	4,017	1,306	2,046	7,000
1965	3,863	1,369	2,071	11,128
1966	3,782	1,460	2,035	6,418
1967	4,031	1,512	—	9,618
1968	4,004	1,646	—	11,864
1969	4,089	1,633	—	10,929

Population of the main urban areas in 1969
City	White	Black	Other	Total
Salisbury	96,420 (25.07%)	280,090 (72.84%)	8,020 (2.09%)	384,530
Bulawayo	50,090 (20.40%)	187,590 (76.38%)	7,910 (3.22%)	245,590
Umtali	8,340 (17.93%)	36,220 (77.88%)	1,950 (4.20%)	46,510
Gwelo	8,390 (18.23%)	36,880 (80.12%)	760 (1.65%)	46,030
Que Que	3,160 (9.62%)	29,250 (89.01%)	450 (1.37%)	32,860
Gatooma	1,880 (8.97%)	18,770 (89.55%)	310 (1.48%)	20,960
Wankie	2,160 (10.72%)	17,980 (89.28%)	—	20,140
Shabani	1,560 (9.87%)	14,170 (89.63%)	80 (0.51%)	15,810
Fort Victoria	2,530 (22.29%)	8,470 (74.63%)	350 (3.08%)	11,350

=== Language ===
White Rhodesians mostly spoke English, with a minority that spoke Afrikaans. Approximately 70% of black Rhodesians spoke Shona, and around 20% spoke Ndebele. A majority of Rhodesia's Indian community spoke Gujarati and a minority spoke Hindi.

=== Religion ===
Rhodesia predominantly adhered to Christianity, with Protestantism being the largest denomination. However, many native Africans still adhered to traditional African religions.

== Foreign relations ==
Throughout the period of its Unilateral Declaration of Independence (1965 to 1979), Rhodesia pursued a foreign policy of attempting to secure recognition as an independent country, and insisting that its political system would include 'gradual steps to majority rule.' Ardently anti-communist, Rhodesia tried to present itself to the West as a front-line state against communist expansion in Africa, to little avail.

Rhodesia received little international recognition during its existence; recognition only occurred after elections in 1980 and a transition to majority rule.

Rhodesia wished to retain its economic prosperity and also feared communist elements in the rebel forces, and thus felt their policy of a gradual progression to black majority rule was justified. However, the international community refused to accept this rationale, believing that their policies were perpetuating racism. This attitude was part of the larger decolonisation context, during which Western powers such as the United Kingdom, France, and Belgium hastened to grant independence to their colonies in Africa.

=== United Kingdom ===
Rhodesia was originally a self-governing British crown colony. Although decolonisation in Africa had begun after World War II, it began accelerating in the early 1960s, causing Britain to negotiate independence rapidly with several of its colonies. During this period, it adopted a foreign policy called NIBMAR, or No Independence Before Majority African Rule, mandating democratic reforms that placed governance in the hands of the majority black Africans. The governing white minority of Rhodesia, led by Ian Smith, opposed the policy and its implications. On 11 November 1965, Rhodesia's minority white government made a unilateral declaration of independence (UDI) from the United Kingdom, as it became apparent that negotiations would not lead to independence under the white regime.

The United Kingdom government immediately brought in legislation (Southern Rhodesia Act 1965) which formally abolished all Rhodesian government institutions. This move made life difficult for Rhodesian citizens who wished to travel internationally as passports issued by Rhodesia's UDI administration were not recognised as valid; in January 1966, the British issued a statement accepting as valid any passport issued before the declaration of independence and allowing six-month United Kingdom passports to be granted when they expired – provided that the bearer declared they did not intend to aid the UDI Rhodesian government.

Developments in Britain helped to alienate the white Rhodesian population from the former mother country, namely Queen Elizabeth II's 1966 speech to the Parliament of Jamaica where she endorsed majority rule and her attempt in 1968 to block the hanging of what Rhodesians perceived as Zimbabwean nationalist terrorists.

Until late 1969, Rhodesia still recognised Queen Elizabeth II as head of state, even though it opposed the British government itself for hindering its goals of independence. However she refused to accept the title Queen of Rhodesia and eventually the Smith government abandoned their attempts to remain loyal to the Crown. In a 1969 referendum, a majority of the electorate voted to declare Rhodesia an independent republic. The hope being that this move would facilitate recognition as an independent state by the international community, but the issue of white minority rule remained and continued to hinder this effort, and like the UDI before it, the proclamation of a republic lacked international recognition.

The British public overall viewed the issue of Rhodesia and UDI as a distant and anachronistic one that they cared relatively little about and saw any expedient response to it by their government as satisfactory. Most Britons saw the end of Rhodesia's white supremacist timocracy as inevitable and justified. Although the majority of Britons opposed military intervention against the renegade Rhodesian state, this opinion was not uniformly held.

=== Sanctions ===
After the declaration of independence, and indeed for the entire duration of its existence, Rhodesia did not receive official recognition from any state, although it did maintain diplomatic relations with South Africa, which was then under apartheid. South Africa did not recognise Rhodesia to preserve its fragile positions with other nations, but frequently assisted the Rhodesian state. Portugal maintained informal relations until the Carnation Revolution of 1974. The day following the declaration of independence, the United Nations Security Council passed a resolution (S/RES/216) calling upon all states not to accord Rhodesia recognition, and to refrain from any assistance. The Security Council also imposed selective mandatory economic sanctions, which were later made comprehensive.

The US, despite voting in favour of the sanctions at the UNSC, violated them to buy chromium ore from Rhodesia. Kenneth Kaunda, president of Zambia, also accused western oil companies of violating the sanctions and selling oil to Rhodesia.

=== International perspective ===
Rhodesia's Unilateral Declaration of Independence from the United Kingdom on 11 November 1965 was promptly condemned by the international community. The United Nations Security Council Resolution 216 of 12 November 1965 called "upon all States not to recognise this illegal racist minority regime in Southern Rhodesia."

Rhodesia campaigned for international acceptance and invoked the doctrine of non-intervention in internal affairs as justification for rebuking external criticism of its internal policies. However, the emerging doctrine of self-determination in colonial situations meant that most nations regarded Rhodesia's self-declared independence as illegitimate.

Zambia, formerly Northern Rhodesia, took a pragmatic approach towards Rhodesia. Kenneth Kaunda, heavily dependent on access through Rhodesia for his nation's copper ore exports, fuel, and power imports unofficially worked with the Rhodesian government. Rhodesia still allowed Zambia to export and import its goods through its territory to Mozambique ports, despite the Zambian government's official policy of hostility and non-recognition of the post-UDI Smith Administration.

The United States, like all other Western nations, refused to recognise Rhodesia, but unlike others allowed its Consulate-General to function as a communications conduit between the US government in Washington, DC and the Rhodesian government in Salisbury. When Rhodesia set up the Rhodesian Information Office in Washington, DC, OAS nations loudly protested. The US government responded by saying the Rhodesian mission and its staff had no official diplomatic status and violated no US laws.

Portugal pursued a middle path with Rhodesia. While not officially recognising Rhodesia under Ian Smith, the government of António Salazar did permit Rhodesia to establish a representative mission in Lisbon, and permitted Rhodesian exports and imports through their province of Mozambique. The Portuguese government in power at that time, authoritarian and ardently anti-communist, gave active behind-the-scenes support in Rhodesia's fight against the guerrilla groups.

South Africa, itself under international pressure as a white minority government, pursued a policy of détente with the black African states at the time. These states wanted South Africa to pressure Ian Smith to accept a faster transition to majority rule in Rhodesia, in return for pledges of non-interference in South Africa's internal affairs. Prime Minister John Vorster, believing majority rule in Rhodesia would lead to international acceptance for South Africa, used a number of tactics to pressure Smith. The South African government held up shipments of fuel and ammunition and pulled out friendly South African forces from Rhodesia. The combined loss of Mozambique and the loss of support from South Africa dealt critical blows to the Rhodesian government.

=== Diplomatic relations ===
After the UDI, Rhodesia maintained several overseas missions, including Pretoria, and until 1975, Lisbon in Portugal and Lourenço Marques (now Maputo) in Mozambique.

Since 1961, Rhodesia had an "Accredited Diplomatic Representative" with South Africa, heading a "Rhodesian Diplomatic Mission" or de facto embassy. Before South Africa left the Commonwealth that year, the then Southern Rhodesia had exchanged High Commissioners with the then Union of South Africa, but following the change in status, the Republic now had a "South African Diplomatic Mission" in Salisbury.

During 1965, the government of Rhodesia made moves to establish a mission in Lisbon separate from the British Embassy, with its own accredited representative, having previously been able to establish its own consulate in Lourenço Marques, capital of Portuguese Mozambique. This prompted protests from the British government, which was determined that the representative, Harry Reedman, should be a nominal member of the British Ambassador's staff. For their part, the Portuguese authorities sought a compromise whereby they would accept Reedman as an independent representative but deny him diplomatic status.

The Rhodesian Information Office in Washington remained open following UDI, but its director, Ken Towsey, and his staff were deprived of their diplomatic status. Previously, there had been a "Minister for Rhodesian Affairs" operating under the aegis of the British Embassy in Washington, as well representatives in Tokyo and Bonn. Following the country's independence as Zimbabwe, Towsey became chargé d'affaires at the new embassy.

The High Commission in London, known as Rhodesia House, continued to function until it was closed in 1969 following the decision by white Rhodesians in a referendum to make the country a republic, along with the "British Residual Mission" in Salisbury. Prior to its closure, the mission flew the newly adopted Flag of Rhodesia, considered illegal by the Foreign Office, prompting calls by Labour MP Willie Hamilton for its removal.

In Australia, the federal government sought to close the Rhodesia Information Centre in Sydney, but it remained open, operating under the jurisdiction of the state of New South Wales. In 1973, the Labor government of Gough Whitlam cut post and telephone links to the centre, but this was ruled illegal by the High Court. An office was also established in Paris, but this was closed down by the French government in 1977.

Similarly, the United States recalled its consul-general from Salisbury, and reduced consular staff, but did not move to close its consulate until the declaration of a republic in 1970. South Africa, however, retained its "Accredited Diplomatic Representative" after UDI, which allowed it to continue to recognise British sovereignty as well as to deal with the de facto authority of the government of Ian Smith.

The South African Diplomatic Mission in Salisbury became the only such mission remaining in the country after 1975, when Portugal downgraded its mission to consul level, having recalled its consul-general in Salisbury in May 1970. After Zimbabwe's independence, the new government closed its missions in Pretoria and Cape Town, only maintaining a trade mission in Johannesburg, while the South African Diplomatic Mission in Salisbury was also closed.

=== Results ===
The growing intensity of the civil war and a lack of international support eventually led the Rhodesian government to submit to an agreement with the UK in 1979. This led to internationally supervised elections, won by Zimbabwe African National Union – Patriotic Front and Robert Mugabe, establishing the internationally recognised Zimbabwe.

== Culture ==
Rhodesia was a racially segregated society. White Rhodesians were the most dominant social force who enjoyed the most amount of rights.

=== Media ===
The most influential newspapers in the country were the Rhodesia Herald in Salisbury and The Chronicle in Bulawayo. Following UDI, in 1976, the state-run Rhodesian Broadcasting Corporation (RBC) took over the privately owned Rhodesia Television (RTV) service, in which it had previously acquired a 51 percent stake. Among the news magazines published in Rhodesia under UDI were the Illustrated Life Rhodesia, while The Valiant Years by Beryl Salt told the history of Rhodesia from 1890 to 1978 entirely through the medium of facsimile reproduction of articles and headlines from Rhodesian newspapers.

=== Sports ===
As Rhodesia was a former colony of the United Kingdom, all of the sports that were born in the United Kingdom enjoyed considerable popularity in Rhodesia; especially cricket, rugby, water polo, football, netball, golf, tennis (including the Rhodesian Open Tennis Championships), lawn bowls, field hockey, etc. Just like neighbouring South Africa, Rhodesia was barred from both competing against and participating with Commonwealth member countries. One of the biggest triumphs in Rhodesia sports history was when the team defeated the New Zealand national rugby team 10-8 while the All Blacks were touring South Africa. They are 1 of 8 nations to ever defeat the All Blacks and the only non-test nation to have ever beaten them.

=== Education ===
A system of primary and secondary education existed albeit a racially segregated one with one being for non-African students (though intended to be just for white students) and one for African students. The education system in Rhodesia had issues with getting not just instructors but qualified ones.

A sole university existed, the University of Rhodesia which was not racially segregated. It offered 3-year bachelor degrees and Doctor of Medicine degrees which could be completed in 6 years. A library system and a number of museums existed in Rhodesia as well.

==== African education system ====
For African students primary school also lasted for 7 years. Around half of early primary students progressed to higher primary levels. and after finishing primary school if they chose to progress to secondary school had to take a test unlike their white counterparts. Secondary school lasted for 4 years but could be extended to 6. Most students did not make it to higher secondary levels.

==== Non-African education system ====
In the white system primary school lasted for 7 years. This was followed by secondary school which was described as being "academic, slow academic, general, or technical-commercial" with the duration varying depending on the track a student chose. A system of special education schools also existed for students who had disabilities for Non-Africans.
