= John Pestell =

Sir John Richard Pestell KCVO (21 November 1916 – 5 July 2005) was Private Secretary and Comptroller to the Governor of Rhodesia from 1965 to 1969.

He was born in 1916 and educated at Portsmouth Northern Secondary School. After a short time in a Civil Service office he joined the British South Africa Police (the police force in Southern Rhodesia) on 23 April 1939. From 1943 to 1946 he served with the British Army in North Africa, including Cyrenaica, and reached the rank of Major.

He returned to Rhodesia as a police sergeant, and resumed his career. On 30 June 1965 he retired from the police force as an Assistant Commissioner to take up the position of Private Secretary to the Governor, Sir Humphrey Gibbs. After the beleaguered Governor eventually resigned and left Government House in 1969, Pestell returned to England with him. Gibbs did not remain in the United Kingdom, simply visiting to take formal leave of Her Majesty the Queen, but Pestell did remain, while Gibbs returned to Southern Rhodesia. His diary of the post-UDI years with Gibbs is especially illuminating for the historians of the period, although as yet unpublished. Pestell subsequently became chief adjudicator on immigration appeals at Heathrow Airport, retiring after 17 years.

In July 1969, Pestell's loyalty to Sir Humphrey Gibbs and the Crown was rewarded by his being made a Knight Commander of the Royal Victorian Order, an honour in the personal gift of the Queen.

He died in 2005 and was buried in Charlton Horethorne, Somerset.
