= United Nations Security Council Resolution 216 =

UN Security Council Resolution 216
- Date: November 12, 1965
- Meeting no.: 1258
- Subject: Question concerning the situation in Southern Rhodesia
- Voting summary: 10 voted for; None voted against; 1 abstained
- Result: Adopted

Security Council composition
- Permanent members: China; France; Soviet Union; United Kingdom; United States
- Non-permanent members: Bolivia; Ivory Coast; Jordan; Malaysia; Netherlands; Uruguay

United Nations Security Council Resolution 216 was adopted by the United Nations Security Council on 12 November 1965, the day after the British Dependency of Southern Rhodesia's Unilateral Declaration of Independence from the British Empire as the state of Rhodesia. The vote was ten to none, with one member, France, abstaining.

In the resolution's two operative paragraphs, the Security Council:

1. Condemned the unilateral declaration of independence "made by a racist minority" in Southern Rhodesia.
2. Called upon all states to refuse the "illegal racist minority régime" in Southern Rhodesia recognition and to refrain from rendering any assistance to it.

Resolution 216 was followed on 20 November by United Nations Security Council Resolution 217, in which the Security Council further elaborated on its condemnation of the UDI government and proposed steps to be taken to address the crisis.

== See also ==
- List of United Nations Security Council Resolutions 201 to 300 (1965–1971)
