= President of Rhodesia =

Head of state from 1970 to 1979

- Flag of the president of Rhodesia (1970–1979)
- Style: The Honourable
- Member of: Cabinet of Rhodesia
- Residence: Government House, Salisbury (now Harare)
- Appointer: Executive Council
- Term length: Five years, renewable once
- Precursor: Queen of Rhodesia
- Formation: 2 March 1970
- First holder: Clifford Dupont
- Final holder: Henry Everard (Acting)
- Abolished: 1 June 1979
- Superseded by: President of Zimbabwe Rhodesia

The president of Rhodesia was the head of state of Rhodesia from 1970 to 1979. As Rhodesia reckoned itself a parliamentary republic rather than a presidential republic at the time, the president's post was almost entirely ceremonial, and the real power continued to be vested in Rhodesia's prime minister, Ian Smith. Two individuals held the office of president, while two others served as acting presidents. Most were of British descent, but Clifford Dupont, the longest-serving, was of Huguenot stock.

As with Rhodesia itself, the position lacked international recognition for the entire period.

Rhodesia was internationally recognised as a British colony until 1980.

== Origins ==
On 11 November 1965, Ian Smith's Rhodesian Front Government proclaimed the Unilateral Declaration of Independence (UDI) from the United Kingdom. On orders from the UK, the then-Governor of Southern Rhodesia, Sir Humphrey Gibbs, immediately sacked Smith and his cabinet. This action was ignored by Smith, who stated that the UDI brought into immediate force a new constitution which dispensed with the position of Governor – and with it, his reserve power to sack them.

The new constitution reconstituted Rhodesia as a Commonwealth realm. It recognised Queen Elizabeth II as "Queen of Rhodesia," with a governor-general as her representative in the country. In lieu of the appointment of a governor-general, an "Officer Administering the Government" would exercise the functions of the governor-general.

Smith had intended to name Deputy Prime Minister Clifford Dupont as Governor-General. However, Queen Elizabeth II would not even consider Smith's "advice" to appoint Dupont as her viceregal representative. Instead, Whitehall insisted that Gibbs was the Queen's only legitimate representative, and hence the only lawful authority in what it still maintained was the Colony of Southern Rhodesia – a position backed by most of the international community.

== Republic ==
For five years, Smith and his government continued to profess loyalty to Queen Elizabeth II and recognised her as Rhodesia's head of state. Indeed, the UDI announcement ended with the words "God Save The Queen." However, in 1969, Smith decided to sever links with the British Crown, by making the country a republic. At a referendum that year, the mostly white electorate voted overwhelmingly in favour of a republic.

Rhodesia was formally proclaimed a republic in 1970, and Dupont assumed the office of president. Smith's position as prime minister remained unchanged. A presidential flag was adopted, featuring a blue field with the coat of arms in the centre. Following the model of the state president of South Africa, Rhodesian presidents had little de facto executive power, and mostly acted on the advice of the prime minister.

Dupont resigned due to ill health in 1975. He was succeeded as president in 1976 by John Wrathall, who died in office in 1978. In 1979 there was an Internal Settlement, which saw a black majority government for the first time, and the country was renamed Zimbabwe Rhodesia. Josiah Zion Gumede was chosen as president. Like the UDI and the declaration of a republic, Zimbabwe Rhodesia was unrecognised internationally and in 1979, Britain resumed control of the rebel colony under the Lancaster House Agreement. Britain appointed Lord Soames as governor until the country became independent within the Commonwealth of Nations as Zimbabwe on 18 April 1980.

== List of presidents of Rhodesia ==
Parties

Rhodesian Front

Symbols

Denotes Acting President

No.	Portrait	Name (Birth–Death)	Term of office			Political party	Cabinet
No.	Portrait	Name (Birth–Death)	Took office	Left office	Duration	Political party	Cabinet
Officer Administering the Government (1965–1970) (Note: During this period, Queen Elizabeth II was still considered to be the official Head of State.)
–	Clifford Dupont	Clifford Dupont (1905–1978); Acting	17 November 1965 (Note: Between 11 and 17 November 1965, the position of Officer Administering the Government was vacant.)	16 December 1965	29 days	RF	Smith
–	Clifford Dupont	Clifford Dupont (1905–1978)	16 December 1965	2 March 1970	4 years, 76 days	RF	Smith
President of the Republic of Rhodesia (1970–1979)
–	Clifford Dupont	Clifford Dupont (1905–1978); Acting	2 March 1970	16 April 1970	45 days	RF	Smith
1	Clifford Dupont	Clifford Dupont (1905–1978)	16 April 1970	31 December 1975 (Resigned)	5 years, 259 days	RF	Smith
–	Henry Everard	Henry Everard (1897–1980); Acting	31 December 1975	14 January 1976	14 days	RF	Smith
2	John Wrathall	John Wrathall (1913–1978)	14 January 1976	31 August 1978 †	2 years, 229 days	RF	Smith
–	Henry Everard	Henry Everard (1897–1980); Acting	31 August 1978	1 November 1978	62 days	RF	Smith
–	Jack Pithey	Jack Pithey (1903–1984); Acting	1 November 1978	5 March 1979	124 days	RF	Transitional government
–	Henry Everard	Henry Everard (1897–1980); Acting	5 March 1979	1 June 1979	88 days	RF	Transitional government

== See also ==
- Governor of Southern Rhodesia
- Prime Minister of Rhodesia
- President of Zimbabwe Rhodesia
- President of Zimbabwe
