= 1969 Rhodesian constitutional referendum =

- 20 June 1969

Adoption of a republican form of government
| For | 81.01% |
| Against | 18.99% |

Adoption of a new constitution
| For | 72.48% |
| Against | 27.52% |

A double referendum was held in Rhodesia on 20 June 1969, in which voters were asked whether they were in favour of or against a) the adoption of a republican form of government, and b) the proposals for a new Constitution, as set out in a white paper and published in a Gazette Extraordinary on 21 May 1969. Both proposals were approved. The country was subsequently declared a republic on 2 March 1970.

== Background ==
=== Position of monarchy after UDI ===
On 11 November 1965, the self-governing British colony of Southern Rhodesia made a Unilateral Declaration of Independence (UDI) although it continued to recognise the British monarch, Queen Elizabeth II, as head of state, with oaths of allegiance to "Her Majesty the Queen Elizabeth, Queen of Rhodesia, her heirs and successors".

However, the Rhodesian Front government of Prime Minister Ian Smith ceased to recognise the authority of her de jure representative, the Governor Sir Humphrey Gibbs. Instead, on 17 November, it appointed former Deputy Prime Minister Clifford Dupont to the post of "Acting Officer Administering the Government".

On 2 December, Smith wrote a personal letter to the Queen, asking her to accept Dupont as the new Governor-General. In response, he was told that "Her Majesty is not able to entertain purported advice of this kind, and has therefore been pleased to direct that no action shall be taken upon it".

Under the 1965 draft Constitution, if the Queen did not appoint a Governor-General within fourteen days of advice being tendered by the Prime Minister, a Regent was to be appointed.

In deference to the British royal family, however, on 16 December, Smith amended his original plan and Dupont was appointed as Officer Administering the Government. He would continue to use the title until the declaration of a republic in 1970.

Consequently, legislation passed after UDI was "enacted by His Excellency the Officer Administering the Government, as the representative of the Queen's Most Excellent Majesty, by and with the advice and consent of the Parliament of Rhodesia".

Similarly, Dupont would deliver the speech from the throne before the Legislative Assembly, and sign bills into law. Opponents of UDI who considered it an illegal move, such as the Independent member of the Legislative Assembly Ahrn Palley, refused to recognise Dupont's office, and walked out of the opening of Parliament in protest.

While Gibbs continued to occupy Government House, Dupont and his wife held official receptions at Governor's Lodge in the Salisbury suburb of Highlands. In 1967, on the second anniversary of UDI, Gibbs declared that his visitors' book would be open to all those who wished to show their loyalty to the Queen, while Dupont, in response, announced that the visitors' book at his office, on the same street, would be open to all those who wished to show their support for UDI.

Neither the Queen nor the British government recognised Dupont as her representative, and while she issued reprieves for two African men sentenced to be hanged in 1968, the Smith government did not accede to her clemency order.

=== Calls for republic ===
Calls for Rhodesia to declare itself a republic began as early as July 1966, when a joint committee of the Rhodesian Front caucus and local party chairmen put forward proposals to sever links with the British monarchy and adopt a republican constitution. Later that year, at a formal ball to celebrate the first anniversary of UDI, there were cries of "republic, republic" among those attending.

As a result of the increasing ambiguity of the Queen's constitutional position, the Rhodesian government believed that only by becoming a republic would Rhodesia be able to improve trade and gain international recognition. Following the unsuccessful talks with British Prime Minister Harold Wilson aboard HMS Fearless in 1968, Smith predicted that Rhodesia would become a republic "irrespective of the outcome of the dialogue with Britain".

Later that year, a Constitutional Commission was appointed, in which one witness argued that "the Queen in her capacity as Queen of Rhodesia is the political prisoner of the British Government". One of the most eager advocates of republic status was Minister of Internal Affairs Lance Smith, who, on 30 May 1969, denounced the Queen as a "figurehead and mouthpiece of whatever government is in power in England."

Writing in his memoir, Smith described republic status as "one of the more controversial proposals", and "no easy decision for many of us who from birth had been ingrained with the British Empire", but it had "become increasingly difficult for us to separate monarch and Empire from the deviousness of the [British] politicians."

=== New Constitution ===
In addition, the Smith government sought to strengthen the position of white minority through the adoption of a new constitution, which would replace the two existing non-racial electoral rolls, determined by property qualifications, with separate rolls for white and African voters.

Under the new constitution, white voters would elect 50 members to the House of Assembly, the lower house of Parliament, while African voters would only elect 8, with an additional 8 seats being indirectly elected to represent chiefs and tribal interests. The Senate, the indirectly elected new upper house, was to be composed of 23 Senators, of whom 10 were to be elected by white Members of the House of Assembly, 10 were African chiefs, half from Mashonaland and half from Matabeleland, chosen by an electoral college composed of members of the Council of Chiefs, and three appointed by the President.

== Results ==
Those eligible to vote were allowed to do so not only in their constituencies but in five regional constituencies (known as multiple polling stations) in which they could vote away from their homes, based around Bulawayo, Fort Victoria, Gwelo and Salisbury, with 5220 votes being cast in this way.

=== Adoption of a republican form of government ===
| Choice | Votes | % |
|---|---|---|
| For | 61,130 | 81.01 |
| Against | 14,327 | 18.99 |
| Invalid/blank votes | 1,207 | – |
| Total | 76,664 | 100 |
| Registered voters/turnout | 94,686 | 80.97 |
Source: Direct Democracy

=== Proposals for new Constitution ===
| Choice | Votes | % |
|---|---|---|
| For | 54,724 | 72.48 |
| Against | 20,776 | 27.52 |
| Invalid/blank votes | 1,206 | – |
| Total | 76,706 | 100 |
| Registered voters/turnout | 94,686 | 81.01 |
Source: Direct Democracy

== Adoption of new constitution ==
=== Declaration of republic ===
A Bill to implement the new constitutional proposals was passed by the Legislative Assembly on 17 November, and was signed into law by Dupont on 27 November. Dupont's last duty as Officer Administrating the Government was to sign the proclamation of a republic on 2 March 1970.

Following the declaration of the republic, Smith commented that "when we asked the Queen to accept us as an independent state, British politicians told her to answer "no" and we became a de facto republic... all that has happened now is that we have become a de jure republic". Dupont was sworn in as the first President under the new republican constitution, following its adoption in April 1970.

When asked by an American journalist whether 2 March would be Rhodesia's "Fourth of July", he replied: "No... today isn't such a tremendous day. We made our decision to become republic quite a long time ago and we are merely going through a process of formalisation. Independence Day is our great day – the day of that unique breakaway from Britain." Instead, the third Monday in October was chosen as Republic Day, a public holiday. Although the Queen's Official Birthday had been retained as a public holiday following UDI, Commonwealth Day was dropped and replaced by Independence Day.

=== Legal and heraldic changes ===
In the legal system, references to "the Crown" were replaced by those to "the State", and senior advocates would no longer be appointed as Queen's Counsel but would be designated as Senior Counsel. Despite this, existing Queen's Counsel were not affected.

Despite not wishing to give legitimacy to the declaration of republican status, the Queen, on the advice of the British government, approved the suspension of the grant of the title "Royal" to the Royal Rhodesia Regiment and the Royal Rhodesian Air Force, and the suspension of her own appointment as Colonel-in-Chief of the Royal Rhodesia Regiment, as well as that of The Queen Mother, as Honorary Commissioner of the British South Africa Police (BSAP); in addition, The Queen Mother was persuaded to relinquish her position as Chancellor of University College, Salisbury.

Similarly, the St Edward's Crown was removed from the badge of the BSAP, although the force's name remained unchanged until July 1980, following the country's independence as Zimbabwe. The Rhodesian Army replaced it with a lion clasping an elephant's tusk, the crest of the British South Africa Company's coat of arms, and the Air Force the Zimbabwe Bird, although the "Lion and Tusk" emblem was used for rank badges.

However, the House of Assembly continued to use the ceremonial mace surmounted with the Crown, previously used by the Legislative Assembly. Modelled on that of the British House of Commons, this initially remained in use by the post-independence House of Assembly of Zimbabwe in 1980. By contrast, the Senate Mace was a distinct design.

Although God Save the Queen ceased to be played at official occasions, no replacement was adopted or used as a national anthem immediately after the declaration of a republic. It was only in 1974 that Rise, O Voices of Rhodesia, sung to the tune of Ode to Joy, was adopted as the national anthem, after unsuccessful attempts to find an original melody.

== International response ==
=== United Nations ===
Like the UDI before it, the change to republican status was not recognised by the United Nations, and was condemned in United Nations Security Council Resolution 277 (1970), which decided that "Member States shall refrain from recognizing this illegal régime or from rendering any assistance to it".

=== British and other governments ===
Britain denounced the move, declaring that "the purported assumption of a republican status by the regime in Southern Rhodesia is, like the 1965 declaration of independence itself, illegal". It closed its residual mission in Salisbury and closed its Rhodesian counterpart in London.

Other countries which had maintained consulates in Rhodesia after UDI, on the grounds that they were accredited to the Queen and not to the Rhodesian government, moved to close them. Between 4 and 17 March 1970, Belgium, Denmark, the Federal Republic of Germany, France, Greece, Italy, the Netherlands, Norway and Switzerland all gave the United Nations notice of their intention to close their consular offices. The United States also closed its consulate, despite the White House favouring it remaining open.

Although South Africa and Portugal did not close their missions in Rhodesia following the declaration of a republic, neither country extended diplomatic recognition.

=== International Olympic Committee ===
Rhodesia was initially allowed to attend the 1972 Summer Olympics in Munich, on condition that the British flag and anthem were used, and with members of its Olympic team described as British subjects. However, it was expelled from the International Olympic Committee, four days before the opening of the games.
