= Queen of Rhodesia =

Former unrecognised constitutional monarchy

- Coat of arms of Rhodesia

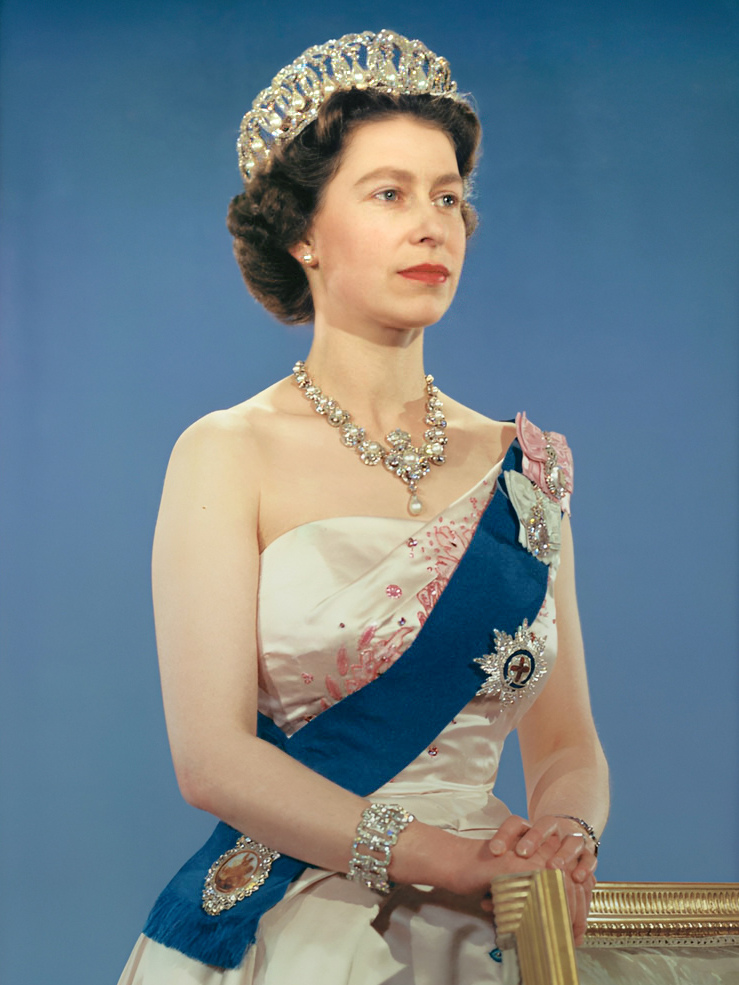
- Elizabeth II

Details
- Style: Her Majesty
- Formed: 11 November 1965; 61 years ago
- Abolished: 2 March 1970; 56 years ago

Queen of Rhodesia was the title asserted for Elizabeth II as Rhodesia's constitutional monarch following the country's Unilateral Declaration of Independence (UDI) from the United Kingdom. The Ian Smith government initially maintained allegiance to Elizabeth, regarding itself as Her Majesty's Government in Rhodesia. Under the amended Rhodesian constitution of 1965, it attempted to retain Elizabeth as queen, and all oaths were still taken to her. However, the British government, along with the United Nations and almost all world governments, regarded the declaration of independence as an illegal act. Elizabeth refused to recognise the title, and it remained unrecognised elsewhere in the world. The Rhodesian government declared the country a republic in 1970, abolishing the position of monarch.

== History ==
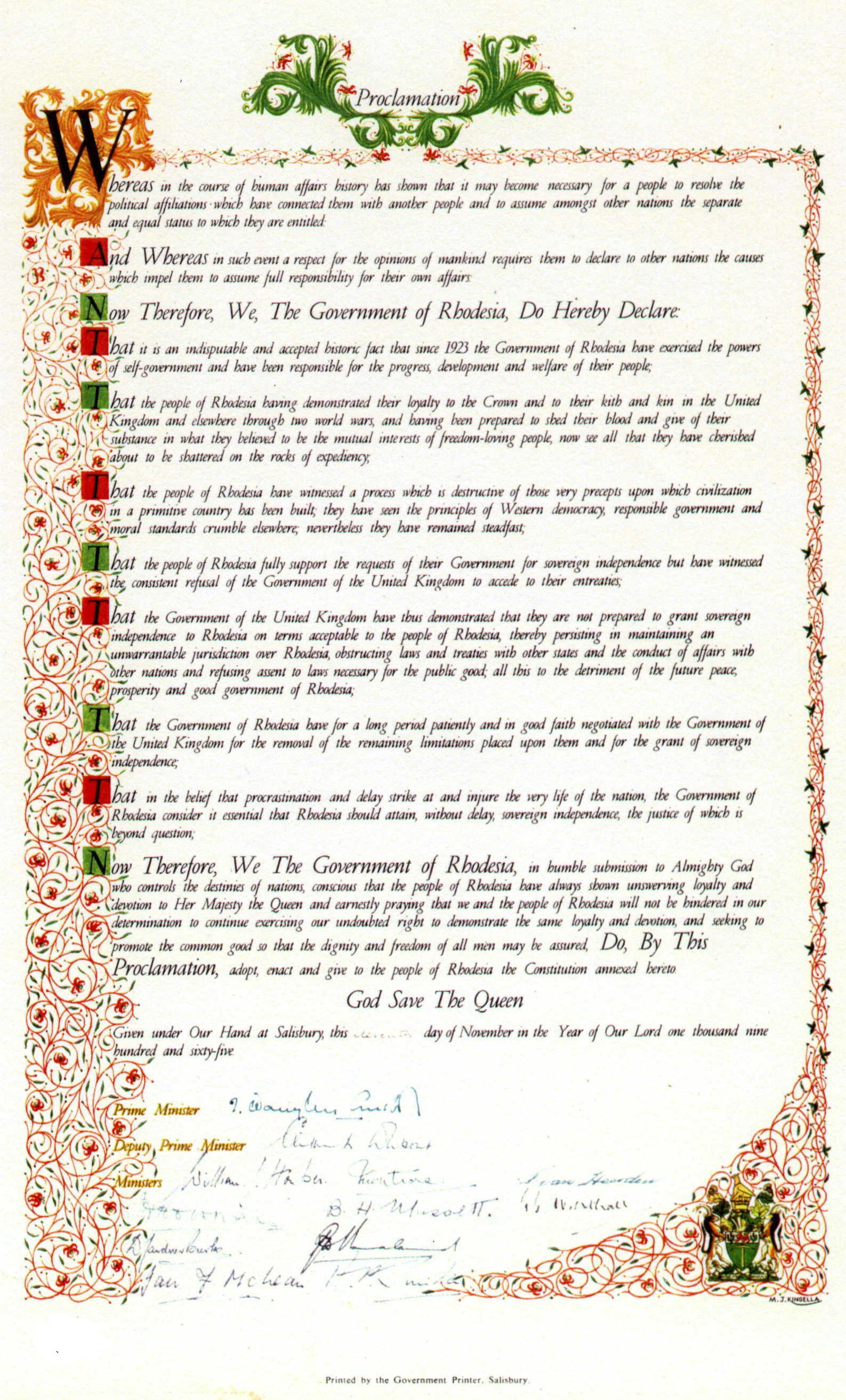
The Unilateral Declaration of Independence ending with "God Save The Queen"

Southern Rhodesia had been granted responsible government in 1923, after the transfer from rule under the British South Africa Company. The monarch of the United Kingdom was automatically recognised as monarch in the colonies. Following the UK refusing to grant Southern Rhodesia independence under minority rule, on 11 November 1965, the Rhodesian Front government of Prime Minister Ian Smith unilaterally declared independence. However, Smith's government reasserted "unswerving loyalty and devotion" to Elizabeth II. To that end, the new Rhodesian constitution included as an annex to UDI that retained the monarchy and recognised Elizabeth as queen of Rhodesia. Smith and his ministers maintained they were only breaking from the British government, not the Queen. They saw the retention of the monarchy as part of a "loyal rebellion". The declaration of independence ended with "God Save The Queen", and all Rhodesian oaths were still taken to "Her Majesty Queen Elizabeth, Queen of Rhodesia, her heirs and successors".

In response, the British governor of Southern Rhodesia, Sir Humphrey Gibbs, dismissed the Smith government from office on orders from London, declaring UDI to be an act of treason. However, Smith and his ministers claimed that under the new constitution, Gibbs "no longer (had) any executive powers in Rhodesia," and his reserve power to sack them no longer existed.

The British Parliament passed the Southern Rhodesia Act 1965, which de jure affirmed British control of the colony and granted Elizabeth II the power to act in the colony. Soon after granting Royal Assent to the bill, Elizabeth issued an order-in-council suspending the Rhodesian constitution and reaffirming the dismissal of the government. These were ignored in Rhodesia; Smith claimed it was an act of the British government and not of the Queen. The Rhodesian theory believed in the divisibility of the Crown to show their political autonomy. The Rhodesians also ceased to recognise Gibbs as the representative of the Queen and asked him to move out of Government House, Salisbury; Gibbs refused. Smith then wrote a letter to Elizabeth asking her to appoint a governor-general to act on her behalf in Rhodesia. He recommended his deputy, Clifford Dupont, for the new viceregal position. Elizabeth did not recognise the title and turned down Smith's request out of hand; she issued a response via Gibbs that said: "Her Majesty is not able to entertain purported advice of this kind and has therefore been pleased to direct that no action should be taken upon it". While Smith saw the letter as an assertion of his claimed prerogatives as Her Majesty's Rhodesian prime minister, Elizabeth treated Smith's request as if it had come from an ordinary citizen, since she and her government no longer recognised Smith as prime minister. Under the provisions of the Southern Rhodesia Act and with the near-unanimous support of the international community, the British government asserted that Gibbs was the Queen's sole legitimate representative in (Southern) Rhodesia, and hence the only lawful authority in the area.

Under the amended 1965 Constitution, a regent was to be appointed if Elizabeth did not designate a governor-general within 14 days. It was initially suggested by Rhodesian officials that, due to his Stuart ancestry, they would appoint the Duke of Montrose as regent until Elizabeth accepted the Rhodesian crown. The suggestion was rejected as a violation of the Regency Act 1953. However, Smith still professed loyalty to the royal family. For this reason, on 16 December, Smith appointed Dupont as Officer Administering the Government in place of any royal appointment. On the British side, the diplomat Michael Palliser suggested that Elizabeth appoint her husband Prince Philip as governor-general and have him arrive with a detachment of Coldstream Guards to legally sack Smith and the Rhodesian Front. However the plan was not feasible due to bringing the royal family into politics, as well as the risk to Philip's safety.

== Power ==
The monarch's powers were the same as prior to the Unilateral Declaration of Independence. However they were de facto exercised by the Officer Administering the Government (Clifford Dupont) rather than by the governor of Southern Rhodesia (Sir Humphrey Gibbs) as Queen Elizabeth II's de jure representative. Every Rhodesian Bill presented to the Officer Administering the Government, had the following words of enactment:

Be it enacted by His Excellency the Officer Administering the Government as representative of the Queen's Most Excellent Majesty, by and with the advice and consent of the Parliament of Rhodesia

In 1968, Elizabeth commuted the sentence of three African men sentenced to death. The Smith government ignored the pardon after the High Court of Rhodesia ruled that, as Rhodesian officials had not been consulted, the pardon came from the orders of the British government rather than from the Queen of Rhodesia. This cleared the way for the men to be executed.

== Symbols ==
The Queen's portrait featured on Rhodesian banknotes and coins, as well as on postage stamps.

Queen Elizabeth II on Rhodesian banknotes

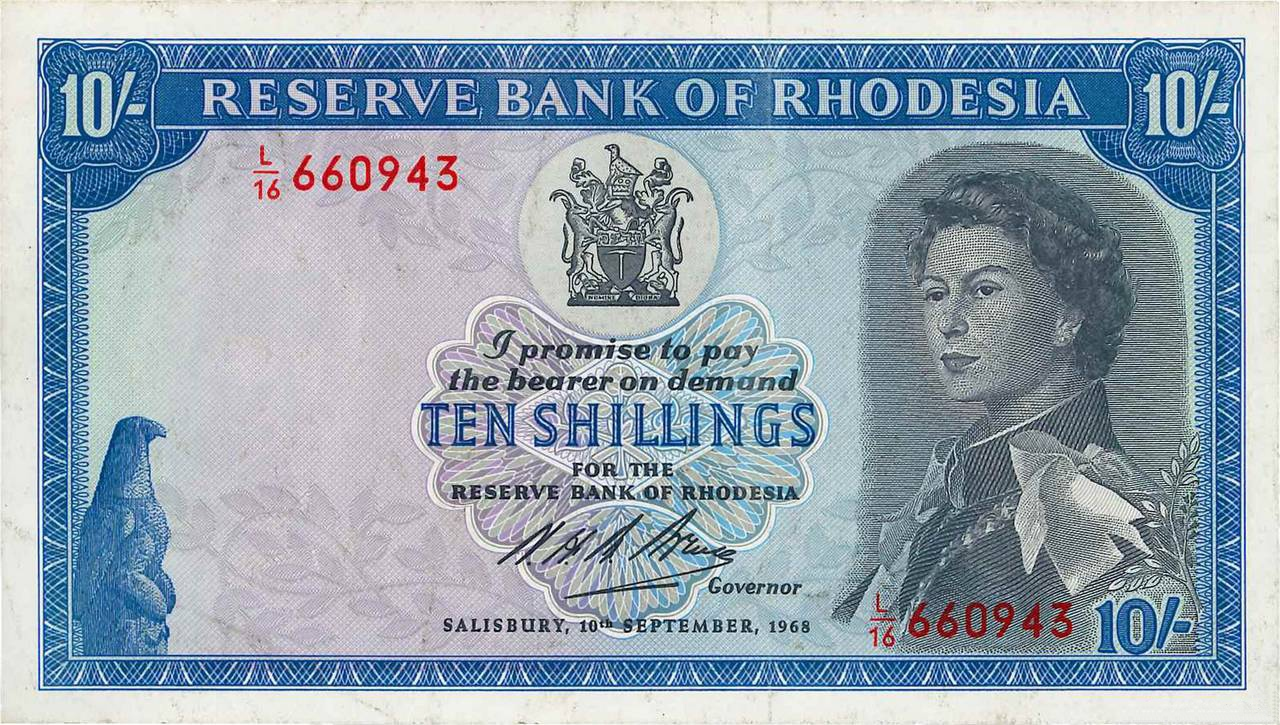
Ten shillings

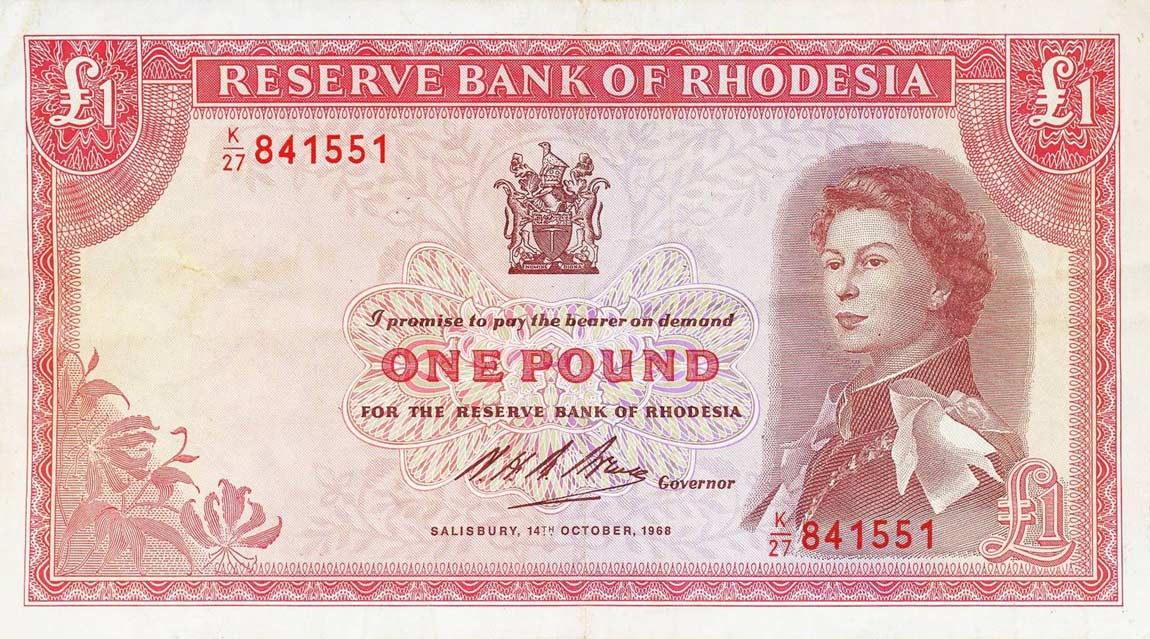
One pound

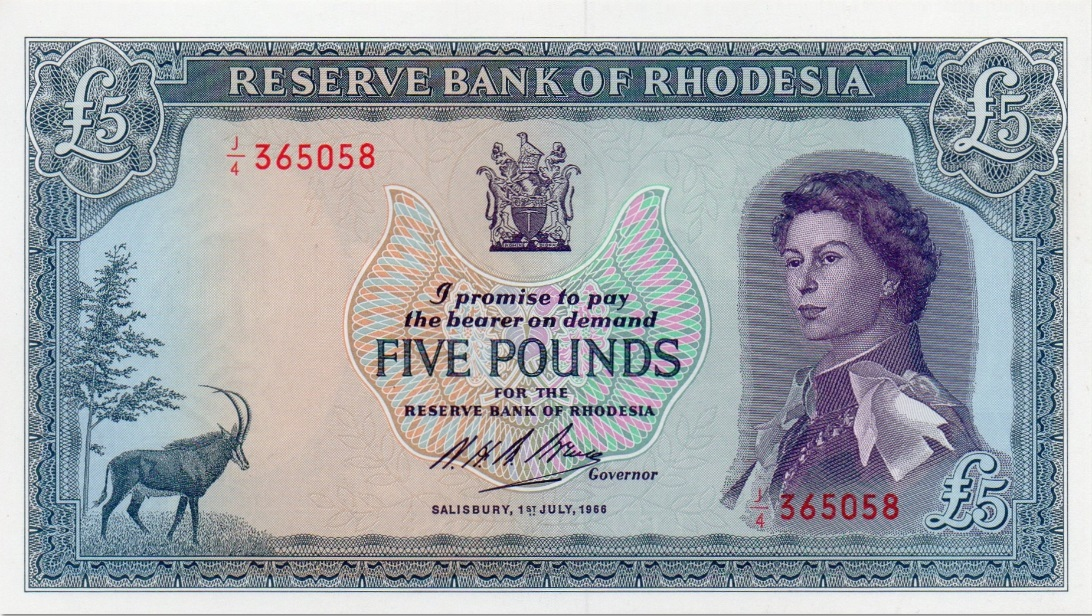
Five pounds

== Abolition ==
There had been calls for Rhodesia to become a republic as early as 1966. The Whaley Commission had been set up by the Rhodesian government in 1967 to review the constitution and recommendations for alterations. After Queen Elizabeth II's pardon was ignored, the Rhodesian government announced that the Queen's Official Birthday would no longer be a public holiday and they would only fire a 21-gun salute on her actual birthday.

The Rhodesian Front published the Whaley Report's proposals for a referendum to abolish the monarchy and establish a republic with a new constitution a month after the executions. Smith argued for it on the grounds that the British government "had denied us the Queen of Rhodesia". In the 1969 Rhodesian constitutional referendum, the Rhodesian electorate voted in favour of the establishment of a republic. The move was opposed by the Catholic Church over fears it would lead to further marginalisation of blacks in Rhodesia. Gibbs also resigned as Governor at this time. The internationally unrecognised republic was declared on 2 March 1970. In response, Queen Elizabeth II formally revoked the royal titles of the Royal Rhodesian Air Force and Royal Rhodesia Regiment. Queen Elizabeth The Queen Mother's honorary commissionership of the British South Africa Police was also suspended. Dupont replaced Elizabeth II as head of state in Rhodesia as the new president.

Contrary to Smith's hope that such a move would bring international legitimacy, it had the opposite effect. All countries that had relations with Rhodesia, except Portugal and South Africa, withdrew their diplomatic missions from the country. This was because originally they maintained relations because of the pre-existing royal accreditation but because a republic had been declared, that rationale was no longer valid.

Rhodesia remained an unrecognised republic until Zimbabwe Rhodesia agreed to return to colonial status in 1979. Queen Elizabeth II resumed monarchical duties over the colony through her role as Queen of the United Kingdom and appointed Lord Soames as her representative as Governor of Southern Rhodesia until its independence as Zimbabwe on 18 April 1980.
