= Clifford Dupont =

British-born Rhodesian politician

The Honourable Clifford Dupont GCLM ID
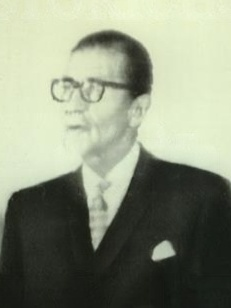
- Dupont at his swearing-in ceremony, 1970

President of Rhodesia
- In office 2 March 1970 – 31 December 1975 (Note: Acting: 2 March 1970 – 16 April 1970)
- Prime Minister: Ian Smith
- Preceded by: Himself as Officer Administering the Government
- Succeeded by: Henry Everard (Acting)

Officer Administering the Government
- In office 17 November 1965 – 2 March 1970 (Note: Acting: 17 November 1965 – 16 December 1965)
- Prime Minister: Ian Smith
- Preceded by: Sir Humphrey Gibbs (Note: Gibbs still claimed the abolished position of Governor of Rhodesia until 24 June 1969) as Governor of Rhodesia
- Succeeded by: Himself as President of Rhodesia

2nd Deputy Prime Minister of Southern Rhodesia
- In office 21 August 1964 – 17 November 1965
- Prime Minister: Ian Smith
- Preceded by: Ian Smith
- Succeeded by: John Wrathall

Personal details
- Born: 6 December 1905 London, England
- Died: 28 June 1978 (aged 72) Salisbury, Rhodesia
- Party: Rhodesian Front
- Spouse(s): Barbie Dunport (m. 1933; div. 1942) Betty Wood (m. 1946; died 1957) Armenell Mary Betty Bennet (m. 1963)
- Children: Hilary; Graham; Stephen
- Education: Clare College, Cambridge
- Profession: Solicitor
- Awards: Legion of Merit GCLM Independence Decoration ID

Clifford Walter Dupont GCLM ID (6 December 1905 – 28 June 1978) was a British-born Rhodesian politician who served in the internationally unrecognised positions of officer administrating the government (from 1965 until 1970) and president (from 1970 to 1975). Born in London and qualifying as a solicitor, Dupont served during the Second World War as an officer of the British Royal Artillery in North Africa before first visiting Southern Rhodesia in 1947. He returned a year later, started a ranch and emigrated full-time during the early 1950s, by which time the country had become a territory of the Federation of Rhodesia and Nyasaland.

When Rhodesia's government under Ian Smith issued the Unilateral Declaration of Independence from Britain on 11 November 1965, Dupont, as Deputy Prime Minister, was the second to sign. Smith attempted to have Dupont named as Governor-General in place of the British-appointed Governor, Humphrey Gibbs, but failing this instead made him Officer Administering the Government. He held this post until 1970, when he became president following the declaration of a republic. After suffering from ill health during this last appointment, he retired at 1976 and died in 1978.

== Early life ==
Of Huguenot ancestry, Dupont was born in London on 6 December 1905, to Alfred Walter and Winifred Mary Dupont into a family which consisted of two older brothers and an elder, and subsequently a younger sister. His father founded a commercial firm dealing largely in the "rag trade". Dupont himself was educated at Bishop's Stortford College and Clare College, Cambridge where he read law. He qualified as a solicitor in 1929 and set up his own firm in 1933.

Having served in the Royal Artillery Officer Training Corps while at university, on the outbreak of World War II he was commissioned into the Artillery and served as an adjutant for a light anti-aircraft battalion. He served in North Africa and was on General Eisenhower's staff during the liberation of Europe in 1944; he ended the war as a War Office official.

== Move to Rhodesia ==
In 1947 Dupont briefly visited Southern Rhodesia, returning in 1948. He bought land at Featherstone, south of Salisbury (now Harare), which he turned into a successful cattle ranch. He emigrated full time in the early 1950s – by which time the Federation of Rhodesia and Nyasaland had come into being, including Southern Rhodesia as a territory – but was not initially involved in politics. Tragedy struck him several times later in the decade: in 1957 his second wife died, and in 1958 his son and daughter were both killed in an air crash.

== Politics ==
He entered politics in 1958, winning on the Dominion Party ticket in the Fort Victoria (now Masvingo) federal constituency. Four years later, he became the member for Charter in the Legislative Assembly of Rhodesia, this time standing for the Rhodesian Front (RF). At the same time, he was appointed Minister for Justice.

However, Dupont was not pleased with the performance of the prime minister, Winston Field, and after Field's failure to win independence from the United Kingdom in 1963 following the dissolution of the Central African Federation, he and Desmond Lardner-Burke, known as "the cowboys", joined forces to overthrow Field and install Ian Smith as prime minister.

In October 1964, Dupont thwarted Sir Roy Welensky's attempt to re-enter politics in Rhodesia following the break-up of the Federation. Welensky had assumed the leadership of the opposition United Federal Party (which he renamed the Rhodesia Party), and was contesting a by-election in Arundel, but Dupont deliberately resigned his constituency in Charter to oppose him. Dupont soundly defeated Welensky by 1079 votes to 633.

Forming a close relationship with the rising RF politician Ian Smith, Dupont assisted in the latter's becoming prime minister in 1964 and was consequently promoted to become Smith's deputy. As Deputy Prime Minister of Rhodesia, he held the portfolio of External Affairs, and added Defence in June 1965.

== UDI role ==
From August 1964 Dupont was deputy prime minister of Rhodesia, and served as Smith's minister of external affairs (adding also the Defence portfolio from June 1965). When Smith issued the Unilateral Declaration of Independence on 11 November 1965, Dupont was the second signatory to the UDI document.

Smith's government initially continued to profess loyalty to Queen Elizabeth II. Accordingly, after UDI it reconstituted Rhodesia as a Commonwealth realm with Elizabeth as head of state. All oaths of allegiance continued to be taken to "Her Majesty the Queen Elizabeth, Queen of Rhodesia, her heirs and successors". At the same time, Smith's government ceased to recognise the authority of her de jure representative, the Governor Sir Humphrey Gibbs. When Gibbs formally dismissed Smith and his entire cabinet on orders from Whitehall, Smith maintained that Gibbs' executive authority, including his reserve power to sack the government, no longer existed.

On 17 November, Smith appointed Dupont to the post of "Acting Officer Administering the Government", effectively superseding Gibbs as Elizabeth's viceregal representative in Rhodesia. Opponents of UDI who considered it an illegal move, such as the independent member of the Legislative Assembly Ahrn Palley, refused to recognise Dupont's office, and walked out of the opening of Parliament when Dupont came to deliver the Speech from the Throne. The appointment was made with a view to making Dupont Governor-General of Rhodesia. Accordingly, on 2 December 1965, Smith wrote a personal letter to the Queen asking her to formally appoint Dupont as Governor-General. In response, Buckingham Palace replied, "Her Majesty is not able to entertain purported advice of this kind, and has therefore been pleased to direct that no action shall be taken upon it". Smith was attempting to assert his claimed prerogatives as Her Majesty's Rhodesian prime minister. However, Elizabeth did not recognise the Rhodesian crown and treated Smith's letter as a request from a private citizen. The UK, with the near-unanimous support of the international community, maintained that Gibbs was the Queen's only legitimate representative in what it still considered to be the colony of Southern Rhodesia, and hence the only lawful authority in the area.

Under the 1965 Constitution, if the Queen did not appoint a governor-general within fourteen days of advice being tendered by the prime minister, a regent was to be appointed. In deference to the royal family, however, on 16 December, Smith amended his original plan and Dupont was appointed as officer administering the government. He would continue to use the title until the declaration of a republic in 1970.

In a referendum held on 24 June 1969, the predominantly white electorate approved a new constitution making Rhodesia a republic, with the president as ceremonial head of state. A bill to that effect was passed by the Legislative Assembly on 17 November, and was signed into law by Dupont on 27 November. Dupont's last duty as officer administrating the government was to sign the proclamation of a republic on 2 March 1970.

== Presidency ==
Following the declaration of a republic on 2 March 1970, Dupont was made interim president pending the elections under a new constitution on 10 April. When Rhodesia was formally declared a republic, Parliament elected Dupont as president on 14 April. His role was largely ceremonial, with the real power still vested in Smith and his cabinet.

During the latter period of his term he suffered long bouts of ill health, and retired on 31 December 1975.

== Personal life ==
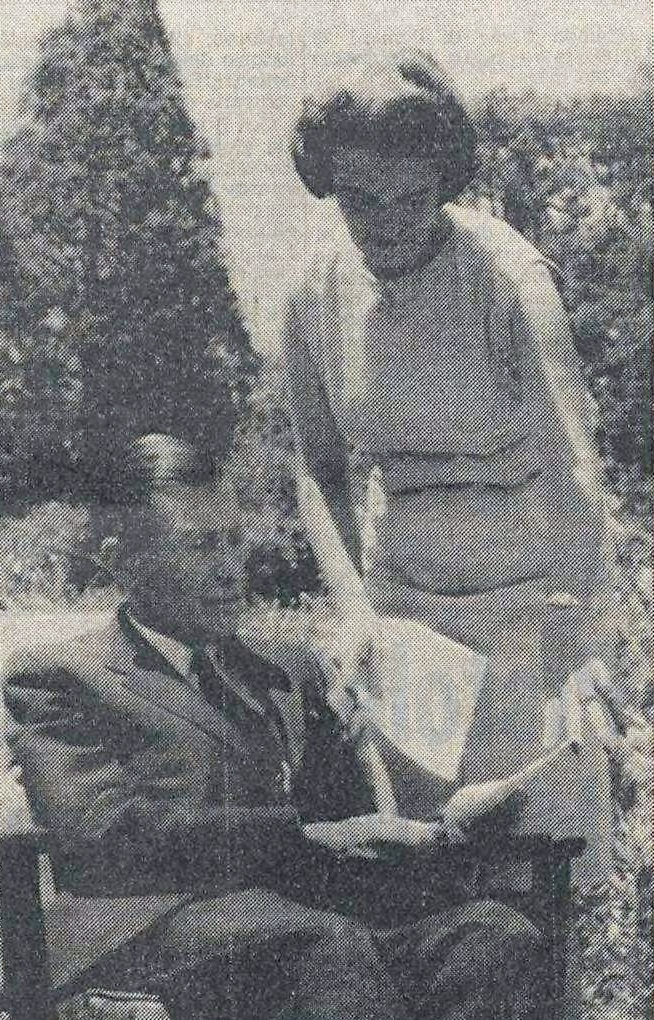
Clifford and Armenell Dupont reading congratulatory messages they received on the eve of the proclamation of the Republic of Rhodesia

Clifford and Barbara Dupont married in London in 1933. They divorced in 1942 after having two children: Hilary and Graham. Graham died in childhood in England in 1942. In 1946, he married his second wife Betty Wood at Kensington and Chelsea Register Office. Wood was fifteen years his junior. In 1947, they had a son, Stephen. Betty died in 1957 in Salisbury, and was buried in Warren Hills. His two children, Hilary and Stephen, were killed in 1958 when their Central African Airways plane crashed near Benghazi.

On 23 May 1963, he married Armenell Mary Betty Bennet (1929-2000), originally from Cornwall, who was a branch organiser for the Rhodesian Front. They had no children. Armenell died on 10 April 2000 in Harare.

On 28 June 1978, Dupont died while undergoing radium treatment for what was believed to be cancer.

== Awards ==
- Legion of Merit (Grand Commander - Civilian) (GCLM) (Rhodesia)
- Independence Decoration (ID) (Rhodesia)

== Publications ==
- Dupont, Clifford (1978). The Reluctant President: The Memoirs of the Hon. Clifford Dupont, GCLM, ID. Bulawayo, Rhodesia: Books of Rhodesia Publishing Co. (Pvt) Ltd. ISBN 0-86920-183-2.

== Notes ==
Rhodesia and Nyasaland Federal Assembly
New title	Member of Federal Parliament for Fort Victoria; 1958 – 1962	Succeeded by
Southern Rhodesian Legislative Assembly
New title	Member of Parliament for Charter; 1962 – 1964	Succeeded by Roger Hawkins
Preceded by Blair Vincent Ewing	Member of Parliament for Arundel; 1964 – 1965	Succeeded by Andrew Skeen
Political offices
Preceded by Rubidge Stumbles	Minister of Justice; Minister of Law and Order; 1962 – 1964	Succeeded by Desmond Lardner-Burke
Vacant Title last held by Lawrence Keller	Minister without Portfolio; 1964	Post abolished
Preceded by Ian Smith	Deputy Prime Minister of Southern Rhodesia; 1964 – 1965	Vacant Title next held by John Wrathall
Preceded by Ian Smith	Minister of External Affairs and Defence; 1964 – 1965	Succeeded by Ian Smith as Minister of Foreign Affairs; Minister of Defence
New title	Officer Administering the Government of Rhodesia; 1965 – 1970	Succeeded by Himself as President of Rhodesia
New title	President of Rhodesia; 1970 – 1975	Succeeded by John Wrathall
