= Humphrey Gibbs =

Governor of Southern Rhodesia from 1959 to 1965

The Right Honourable Sir Humphrey Gibbs GCVO KCMG KStJ OBE PC

8th Governor of Southern Rhodesia (Note: Called by the internationally unrecognised government the Governor of Rhodesia from 24 October 1964. Post reinstated from 12 December 1979 under the original name of Governor of Southern Rhodesia.)
- In office 28 December 1959 – 11 November 1965 (Note: The post-independence internationally unrecognised Constitution of Rhodesia, which came into force on 11 November 1965, abolished the post of Governor and replaced it with the positions of Governor-General and Officer Administering the Government for when the internationally unrecognised Queen of Rhodesia did not appoint a Governor-General. On 17 November 1965, his responsibilities were officially bestowed upon Clifford Dupont as Acting Officer Administering the Government.); De jure: 28 December 1959 – 24 June 1969 (Note: The date his appointment came to an end under United Kingdom law, being the law of the internationally recognised responsible government. No longer recognised by the internationally unrecognised government in Rhodesia from 11 November 1965, when independence was unilaterally declared.)
- Monarch: Elizabeth II
- Prime Minister: Sir Edgar Whitehead; Winston Field; Ian Smith
- Preceded by: Sir Peveril William-Powlett
- Succeeded by: De facto: Clifford Dupont (Acting Officer Administering the Government); De jure: Christopher Soames, Lord Soames (holding the reinstated office of Governor after 12 December 1979)

Personal details
- Born: 22 November 1902 London, England
- Died: 5 November 1990 (aged 87) Harare, Zimbabwe
- Spouse: Molly Gibbs (m. 1934)
- Parent: Herbert Gibbs, 1st Baron Hunsdon of Hunsdon (father)
- Education: Trinity College, Cambridge

Sir Humphrey Vicary Gibbs GCVO KCMG OBE KStJ PC (22 November 1902 – 5 November 1990), was the penultimate Governor of the colony of Southern Rhodesia, from 24 October 1964 described by its internationally unrecognised government simply as Rhodesia, who served until, and opposed, the Unilateral Declaration of Independence (UDI) in 1965.

== Early life ==
Gibbs was born on 22 November 1902 in England, the third son of Herbert Gibbs, a younger son of Hucks Gibbs, 1st Baron Aldenham. In 1923 his father was created Baron Hunsdon. He was educated at Ludgrove School, Eton, and Trinity College, Cambridge. He moved to Southern Rhodesia in 1928, buying a farm at Nyamandhlovu, near Bulawayo.

Gibbs became active in farming administration and helped found the National Farmers Union. He was elected to the Legislative Assembly at the general election of 1948 as a United Party member, representing the constituency of Wankie, serving one term before standing down in 1954.

== As Governor of Southern Rhodesia ==
In 1959, Queen Elizabeth II appointed Gibbs as Governor of Southern Rhodesia and appointed him a Knight Commander of the Order of St Michael and St George (KCMG) in 1960.

The Unilateral Declaration of Independence (UDI) by the Rhodesian Front government (under Prime Minister Ian Smith) in November 1965 placed Gibbs in a very difficult position. He was intensely loyal to Rhodesia, and was a close friend of Ian Smith, but he was also equally loyal to his office as the Queen's viceroy. While understanding what had made Smith's government declare the UDI, Gibbs decided that final legality rested with the Crown, not Smith and his government.

By the time Smith and Deputy Prime Minister Clifford Dupont called on Governor Gibbs after the UDI was signed, Whitehall had directed Gibbs to use his reserve power to dismiss Smith and his entire cabinet from office. Gibbs complied with the order without hesitation. He declared that by issuing the UDI, Smith and his government had committed an act of treason.

The Government have made an unconstitutional declaration of independence. I have received the following message from Her Majesty's Secretary of State for Commonwealth Relations: 'I have it in command from Her Majesty to inform you that it is Her Majesty's pleasure that, in the event of an unconstitutional declaration of independence, Mr. Ian Smith and other persons holding office as Ministers of the Government of Southern Rhodesia or as Deputy Ministers cease to hold office. I am commanded by Her Majesty to instruct you in that event to convey Her Majesty's pleasure in this matter to Mr. Smith and otherwise to publish it in such manner as you may deem fit.'
In accordance with these instructions I have informed Mr. Smith and his colleagues that they no longer hold office. I call on the citizens of Rhodesia to refrain from all acts which would further the objectives of the illegal authorities. Subject to that, it is the duty of all citizens to maintain law and order in this country and to carry on with their normal tasks. This applies equally to the judiciary, the armed services, the police and the public service.

— Gibbs' statement upon UDI

However, Smith and his ministers simply ignored the dismissal, advising Gibbs that "in view of the new [Rhodesian] constitution..., he no longer has any executive powers in Rhodesia"—and therefore, his power to sack them no longer existed.

== Under siege ==
Official Flag of Rhodesia during Gibbs's term as Governor

Several high-ranking officers of the Rhodesian military went to Governor Gibbs earlier in the day, made a statement of loyalty to him, and asked Gibbs to issue a warrant so that they could arrest Smith and Dupont. However, Gibbs knew that the bulk of the officer corps, as well as the rank and file of the Rhodesian military, were solidly behind Smith's government and that such a move would lead to a coup d'état.

Gibbs announced that despite the UDI, he had no intention of resigning his office or leaving Rhodesia, and that therefore, he would remain in Government House in Salisbury as the sole legal representative of Queen Elizabeth II. With few exceptions, the international community continued to recognise him as the Queen's sole legitimate representative in the area—and thus, the only lawful authority in what London maintained was still the colony of Southern Rhodesia.

In response, Smith declared that Government House was only "temporarily occupied" by Gibbs "in a personal capacity", and would be occupied by Dupont (whom he had appointed as Officer Administering the Government after London rejected Smith's advice to make him Governor-General) as soon it became available. This action led to four years of harassment and petty afflictions by the Rhodesian government, resulting in making Gibbs and his wife virtually prisoners in Government House, by cutting off his telephone, electricity and water.

It also took away his ceremonial guard and official cars, and sent him bills for the rent of Government House, which he refused to pay. However, his supporters set up a Governor's Fund to pay for the upkeep of the building, and with the assistance of a small staff, led by John Pestell, he managed to remain defiant.

While Gibbs continued to occupy Government House, Dupont and his wife held official receptions at Governor's Lodge in the Salisbury suburb of Highlands. This had previously been used by Gibbs when Southern Rhodesia was part of the Federation of Rhodesia and Nyasaland. During this time, Government House had been the residence of the Governor-General of the Federation.

In 1967, on the second anniversary of UDI, Gibbs declared that his visitors' book would be open to all those who wished to show their loyalty to the Queen, while Dupont, in response, announced that the visitors' book at his office, on the same street, would be open to all those who wished to show their support for the UDI.

In June 1969, Gibbs resigned after Smith's government held and won a referendum that year making Rhodesia a republic. He remained in Rhodesia and lived the rest of his life on his farm. Throughout the 1970s he was known for supporting the cause of African nationalism, which brought him into conflict with the government of Ian Smith. Later he was appointed to Her Majesty's Most Honourable Privy Council and was made a Knight Grand Cross of the Royal Victorian Order (GCVO) by Queen Elizabeth II. After independence in 1980 he decided to "stay on" and took up Zimbabwean citizenship. He stayed on his farm where he had been living since 1970 until 1983 when he moved to Harare, where he lived until his death in 1990.

Gibbs died in Harare on 5 November 1990, with his funeral held at the Cathedral of St Mary and All Saints, Harare. In 2004 a memorial to Gibbs by Lettering and Sculpture Limited was unveiled in St Paul's Cathedral in London.

== Marriage ==
On 17 January 1934, Gibbs married Molly Peel Nelson (b. 13 July 1912, Johannesburg) in Bulawayo, and they had five sons together. Molly Gibbs (Lady Gibbs from 1960), was appointed as a Commander of the Order of St John of Jerusalem (CStJ) in 1960, and a Dame Commander of the Order of the British Empire (DBE) in 1969. Following Gibbs' death in 1990, Molly Gibbs moved to England and died on 20 January 1997 in Tunbridge Wells, Kent.

== Honours ==
Member of The Most Honourable Privy Council	1969
Knight Grand Cross of the Royal Victorian Order (GCVO)	9 July 1969
Knight Commander of the Royal Victorian Order (KCVO)	18 November 1965
Knight Commander of the Order of St Michael and St George (KCMG)	NY 1960
Knight of the Order of St John of Jerusalem (KStJ)	NY 1960
Officer of the Order of the British Empire (OBE; Civil Division)	NY 1959
Queen Elizabeth II Coronation Medal	Coronation 1953

Southern Rhodesian Legislative Assembly
Preceded by John Alexander Ewing	Member of Parliament for Wankie; 1948 – 1954	Constituency abolished
Government offices
Preceded by Sir Peveril William-Powlett	Governor of Southern Rhodesia; 1959 – 1969	Succeeded by Clifford Dupont as Officer Administering the Government (from 1965)
Preceded by Sir Peveril William-Powlett	Governor of Southern Rhodesia; 1959 – 1969	Vacant Title next held by Lord Soames
