= 1979 Rhodesian constitutional referendum =

- 30 January 1979

Results
Choice	Votes	%
Yes	57,269	85.38%
No	9,805	14.62%
Valid votes	67,074	98.87%
Invalid or blank votes	764	1.13%
Total votes	67,838	100.00%
Registered voters/turnout	94,900	71.48%

A constitutional referendum was held in Rhodesia on 30 January 1979. It followed the Internal Settlement drawn up between Prime Minister Ian Smith and Abel Muzorewa, leader of the non-violent UANC. The new constitution would bring in black majority rule in the country, which would be renamed Zimbabwe Rhodesia. The settlement was supported by the ruling Rhodesian Front, but opposed by the Rhodesian Action Party, which had broken away from the Front.

The referendum was open only to white voters, passing by 85%. Voter turnout was 71.5%.

Despite the transition to majority rule following elections in April, the country remained unrecognised by the international community, and the Patriotic Front parties continued the Bush War until the signing of the Lancaster House Agreement and fresh elections in 1980.

== Results ==
Choice	Votes	%
For	57,269	85.38
Against	9,805	14.62
Total	67,074	100.00
Valid votes	67,074	98.87
Invalid/blank votes	764	1.13
Total votes	67,838	100.00
Registered voters/turnout	94,900	71.48
Source: African Elections Database

== Aftermath ==
Rhodesian Action Party president Ina Bursey denounced the "yes" vote in the referendum, declaring "The Rhodesian people have sold their souls to the devil and deserve to reap the fruits of the whirlwind." She announced that the party would be dissolved and that she would be emigrating from Rhodesia.

== See also ==
- 1992 South African apartheid referendum
