= Commonwealth Monitoring Force in Rhodesia =

Peacekeeping force in Rhodesia

Commonwealth Monitoring Force
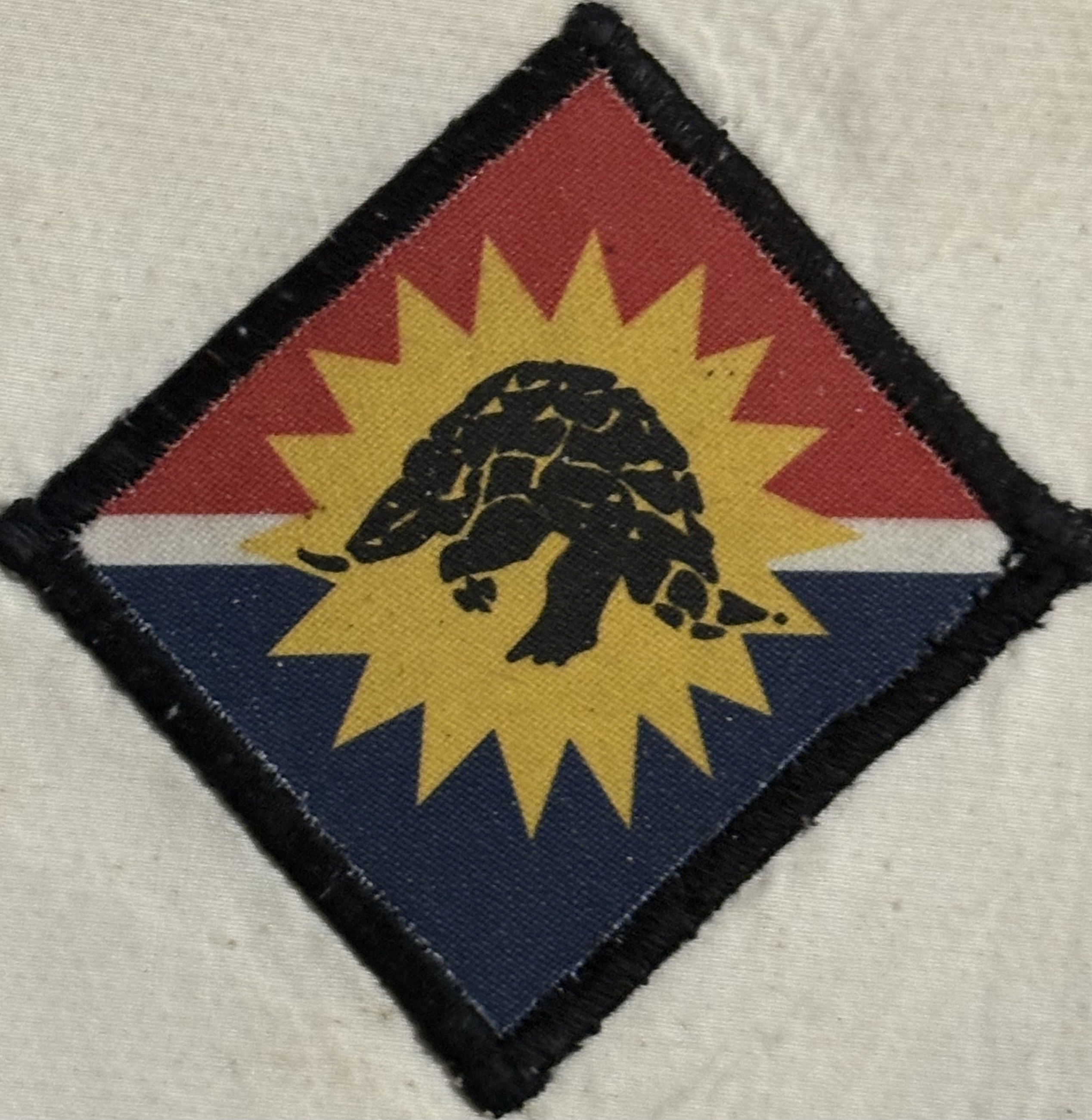
- Commonwealth Monitoring Force Formation Badge, representing a Pangolin worn on a white brassard.
- Active: December 8, 1979 – March 16, 1980
- Countries: Australia; Fiji; Kenya; New Zealand; United Kingdom
- Allegiance: Commonwealth of Nations
- Role: Peacekeeping
- Size: 1500 Troops; 581 Police officers
- Headquarters: Salisbury, Rhodesia
- Nickname: CMFR (CLAMOR)
- Engagements: Rhodesian Bush War

Commanders
- Task Force Commander: Major General Sir John Acland
- Commander of Australian Contingent: Colonel Kevin Cole
- Commander of New Zealand Contingent: Colonel David Moloney

The Commonwealth Monitoring Force in Rhodesia (CMFR) known as Operation Agila was a United Kingdom-led Commonwealth of Nations peacekeeping force deployed in Rhodesia between 1 January 1979 and 31 December 1980, aimed at ensuring the peaceful implementation of the Lancaster House Agreement, the 1980 general election and the transition to independence as Zimbabwe.

== Background ==
As a result of the Rhodesian Bush War, 1978 Internal Settlement and international pressure, the Commonwealth Monitoring Force in Rhodesia (Sometimes called Commonwealth Liaison, Advisory and Monitoring Organisation, Southern Rhodesia (CLAMOR) was established by the Commonwealth on December 1st, 1979. Following the conclusion of the Lancaster House Agreement on the 21st of December, the CMFR was tasked to supervise and assist in the implementation of the Lancaster House Agreement between the government of Southern Rhodesia and the guerrilla forces of the Patriotic Front, including a ceasefire that would begin on the 28th of December at midnight. As a result of the Lancaster House Agreement, the United Kingdom was given temporary authority over the state of Rhodesia, temporarily changing the name to Southern Rhodesia in order to facilitate a free election. The CMFR was composed of 1,500 ground personnel, of which 1,200 were British, 152 were Australians (known as the Australian Contingent to Southern Rhodesia/Zimbabwe (ASCSR), 76 were New Zealanders as part of Operation Midford, 46 were Kenyans and 24 were Fijians.

== Military Operations ==
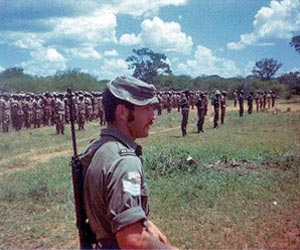
A Soldier from New Zealand supervising ZIPRA men during the military ceasefire.

Under Major general Sir John Acland of the British Army a 9 man advanced logistics party was deployed to Rhodesia on December 8, 1979, followed by the bulk of British CMFR forces on December 12. On the 25th of December members of the New Zealand, Australian and Fijian Militaries flew into Salisbury, arriving from RNZAF Whenuapai and RAAF Richmond. Australian Forces where initially delayed arriving one day later than planned due to Tropical Cyclone Claudette which prevented air travel over Mauritius. Members of the CMFR were accommodated in a tent camp with the exception of Fijian, Kenyan and New Zealand forces who were based at Morgan High School. CMFR forces were tasked with monitoring the activities of Zimbabwe People's Revolutionary Army, Zimbabwe African National Liberation Army and Rhodesian Security Forces in order to enforce the military ceasefire until the conclusion of the 1980 Southern Rhodesian general election. Under Colonel Kevin Cole Australian forces were assigned to monitor Zimbabwe African National Union (ZANU) assembly points in Elim, Magadze, Marymount, Dendera and Kari-Yangwe in addition to Rhodesian Security Forces assembly zones at Mount Darwin, Bindura, and Sinoia (Chinhoyi).

Following the election held on the 27 to 29 February 1980, on the 2nd of March 1980, all CMFR personal were pulled back to Salisbury before being return to their home nations. By the 16th of March 1980 only a 40 man volunteer force of British infantry instructors remained to train the newly formed Zimbabwe National Army.

During the course of Operation Agila CMFR personal engaged in minor skirmishes including when a RAF Hercules aircraft was hit by small arms fire. In 1979 a Royal Air Force Puma helicopter crashed resulting in the death of the 3 man crew.

== Exclusion of South Africa ==
Despite the Union of South Africa's status as a commonwealth nation, due to its consistent support of the Rhodesian Security Forces via weapons, supplies and intelligence during the Rhodesian Bush War it was decided that South African forces would not be able to remain independent in the role of peacekeeping. South Africa played no role in the Lancaster House Agreement unlike most other commonwealth nations instead being condemned for its support of Rhodesia. Later United Nations Security Council Resolution 463 encouraged the United Kingdom to ensure that all South African Forces and mercenaries left the country.

== Police involvement ==
581 members of numerous British Police forces were involved as assistant election supervisors during the 1980 elections. They were initially posted to the British South Africa Police headquarters in Salisbury before being posted off to their relevant polling stations.

== Impact ==
The CMFR successfully enforced ceasefire and facilitated the 1980 Southern Rhodesian general election with Robert Mugabe being declared the first president of the newly formed Zimbabwe resulting in the dissolution of Southern Rhodesia. On 18 April 1980 the Union Jack was lowered for the last time from Government House in Salisbury, and the new African nation of Zimbabwe declared itself independent as a republic within the Commonwealth of Nations. Members of CMFR were awarded with the Rhodesia Medal as part of a joint commonwealth honors program.

== See also ==
- Operation Midford, New Zealand's contribution to the Commonwealth Monitoring Force
- List of non-United Nations peacekeeping missions
