= Operation Midford =

New Zealand peacekeeping effort in Rhodesia

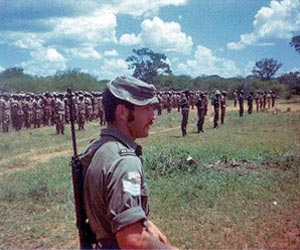
New Zealander serving with the Commonwealth Monitoring Force at a ZIPRA assembly point.

Operation Midford was New Zealand's contribution to the Commonwealth Monitoring Force in Rhodesia in late 1979 and early 1980 that eventually led to the Lancaster House Agreement and the independence of Zimbabwe.

== Background ==
By 1979, the Rhodesian Bush War had been in progress for 14 years, largely overshadowed by the television-driven Vietnam War and ignored internationally, until the guerrillas committed atrocities on various Missionary stations. There were three belligerent parties, including the predominantly white-led Rhodesian Security Forces, and two rival black nationalist guerrilla factions: the Zimbabwe People's Revolutionary Army (ZIPRA), armed wing of Joshua Nkomo's Zimbabwe African People's Union, and the Zimbabwe African National Liberation Army (ZANLA), armed wing of Robert Mugabe's Zimbabwe African National Union.

=== Lancaster House talks ===
In April 1979 an election was held in Zimbabwe Rhodesia in which 63% of the black population voted, and on 1 June 1979, Bishop Abel Muzorewa was sworn in as the first black Prime Minister of Rhodesia. Meanwhile, the Peace Talks at Lancaster House continued sporadically. By October 1979, a resolution to the conflict appeared possible, and the UK government made contact with various Commonwealth nations to discuss the provision of troops for a special operation.

In New Zealand, selection and training began immediately and a force of 75 officers and men were selected and moved to Papakura Military Camp for specialist training. None of the soldiers were told officially where they would be sent, but initially the 75-strong contingent was called "R Force", similar to the Korean War's "K Force" and the Vietnam War's "V Force". They were also instructed to listen to BBC World Service at 7am every morning, so the possibility of a tour of duty to Rhodesia was an open secret. Originally, both Mugabe and Nkomo did not want any New Zealanders in the Peacekeeping – Monitoring Force as they were thought to be American puppets, due to New Zealand troops serving in Vietnam. However, their opinions changed when they learned that one quarter of the New Zealand contingent was "coloured" (Māori/native New Zealanders). The Commanding Officer for the Kiwi Contingent was the professional soldier Colonel David W. S. Moloney RNZIR (later OBE).

The Operation patch worn as a brassard by the New Zealand members of the New Zealand Truce Monitoring Contingent (NZATMC) was a red, white, and blue diamond with a golden sunburst in the centre and a pangolin with its claws extended centred in the sun. This was to be worn on a white brassard. The uniform to be worn by all members of the MF was to be "Jungle Green" fatigues, and "Jungle Hats" would be worn by all members serving in the operational areas, to distinguish them from the Rhodesian Army, whose camouflage fatigues were extremely distinctive.

== Deployment ==
On 20 December 1979, the New Zealand contingent flew out from RNZAF Base Whenuapai, and between 22 and 24 December 1979 the various elements of the Commonwealth Monitoring Force began to arrive at Salisbury Airport. Upon arrival each plane load of troops was processed through a reception tent, given an initial briefing and issued anti-malaria tablets (Maloprim) which were known locally as the "Tuesday Pill". The entire nation was reminded on both radio and television to take their pill each Tuesday. Troops were also given the opportunity to exchange money and were given the location of their billets.

The Rhodesian Army built a tented transit camp which accommodated the majority of the troops with the exception of the Fijians, Kenyans, and New Zealanders who were accommodated at Morgan High School, which was to become NZATMC's headquarters. During this five-day phase of the operation, more than 60 aircraft sorties landed at Salisbury Airport, delivering more than 1,500 men and a large amount of stores and equipment.

== Preparation and planning ==
The next several days were packed with detailed briefings, O Groups, and the issuing of stores, ammunition, and equipment. Due to the height of Rhodesia above sea level, every Kiwi soldier was also required to attend a range shoot and re-zero his personal weapon, as the altitude made a difference to sight settings. During this time the CMF, Major General John Acland personally introduced himself to every member of the Monitoring Force during his initial briefings, usually held at the RLI Barracks at Cranborne.

Other briefings included:

- The CMF's lecture on the responsibility of the Monitoring Force
- An overview on the background of the war and the politics involved
- The background to the operational situation
- The CMF's concept of how the operation was to be conducted
- The allocation of troops to task
- The in-theatre deployment plan
- The rules of engagement
- A crash course for the Kiwis on the Clansman radio

The operational areas during the Rhodesian War were:

- A. Operation Ranger – Northwest border
- B. Operation Thrasher – Eastern border
- C. Operation Hurricane – Northeast border
- D. Operation Repulse – Southeast border
- E. Operation Grapple – Midlands
- F. Operation Splinter – Kariba
- G. Operation Tangent – Matabeleland
- H. "SALOPS" – Salisbury & District

The Peacekeeping Forces on the ground, were broken down as follows:

- There were 16 Assembly Places (AP November and AP Quebec later closed).
- There were 39 RVs during the ceasefire period.

The New Zealand contingent provided:

- a Headquarters element based at Morgan High School, Salisbury.
- 2 x Assembly Place Teams (AP LIMA and AP MIKE).
- 3 x Sub-Joc (Joint Operations Command) Teams.
- 8 x Company Based Teams (co-located with Rhodesian Units).
- 2 x border Liaison Teams.

== Forward deployment ==
The decision to deploy the Monitoring Force was made on 24 December 1979, and the forward deployment took place over the next three days with the ceasefire coming into effect at 2359 + 1, on 28 December. This was an extremely tense time as no one knew how the communist guerrillas in the operational areas might react, but the large number of reporters in Rhodesia may have prevented further escalation.

During the forward deployment phase the weather was highly unfavourable, and Royal Air Force aircrew flew missions that would never have been authorised under normal circumstances. There were a number of contacts during this phase of the operation: A Rhodesian Escort AFV (Crocodile) was destroyed by a mine near Bulawayo; an RAF Puma helicopter crashed killing the three-man aircrew; a Hercules aircraft was shot up by small arms fire near Umtali; and an RV Team was ambushed in the Zambezi Valley but escaped without casualties.

== Assembly phase ==
The Assembly phase was a seven-day period when all of the communist units and cells spread throughout Rhodesia, and in several of the neighbouring countries were guaranteed unhindered movement into RV's and Assembly Places. Once in the Assembly Place, all communists, both Regular Force and guerrillas were required to register their name, weapon and that weapon's serial number. Both the ZIPRA and ZANLA had played down the size of their forces and over that seven-day period more than 22,000 communist soldiers marched into the 16 Assembly Places.

The sheer size of the various ZIPRA and ZANLA units created logistical challenges, and to avoid "under issues", if any communist unit required some special item (e.g., sanitary pads, female underwear), a drop was immediately arranged to all of the Assembly Places, sometimes causing amusement to the troops on the ground (ZANLA had a sizeable force of female guerillas). The communists were supposed to arrive at the Assembly Places carrying all of their own equipment, however most of them carried little more than an AK47, a couple of magazines and the clothes they were wearing. Many wore no boots. Food and meat shortages caused major problems on a number of occasions and almost resulted in the deaths of a number of Peacekeepers who were taken hostage. It had been understood that the communists lived on sadza (i.e., corn mealie meal), and initially no meat was provided for them. This was quickly rectified, by the CMF importing several planeloads of South African beef.

Once in the Assembly Places, the communist troops became very lax and always carried their personal weapon "locked, cocked and ready to rock"; that is several magazines taped together on the weapon, the weapon cocked with a round in the tube, safety catch "off", and sights set to maximum range. This resulted in a plague of unauthorised discharges (UDs) and numerous casualties. It also caused tremendous stress and tension amongst the MF Teams. There were even UDs with hand grenades and Rocket-propelled grenades resulting in injury and loss of life. There was also the ever-present danger of mines throughout the entire operation.

== Redeployment of RV teams ==
The ceasefire ended on 4 January 1980 at 2359 + 1, and as most of the communists were now gathered at the various Assembly Places, the RV Teams were disbanded and those men were then added to various Assembly Places so as to boost the numbers there. Assembly Place "November" and Assembly Place "Quebec" were both closed as no communists had been recently operating in that area (Northern border), and the Commonwealth troops at those locations were redistributed to some of the larger Assembly Places that were holding several thousand communists. Assembly Place Foxtrot held over 6,000 communists.

== Election period ==
This part of the operation lasted from 5 January 1980, when the ceasefire ended until 3 March 1980, which was in fact after the elections had been held, but before the results were announced. The election results were announced on 4 March 1980. During this period, a contingent of British police officers were flown into Rhodesia and they served as observers at the many polling places scattered throughout the country. There were many breaches in the ceasefire as all three sides attempted to gain a position of strength, and "large numbers of hard-core guerrillas remained outside the camps and continued to intimidate" the electorate.

== Withdrawal ==
On 2 March 1980, all Monitoring Force personnel were pulled back to a tented camp in and around New Sarum Air Force Station, and immediately the Royal Air Force began flying sorties of men and equipment back to the UK and various other Commonwealth countries. Many Rhodesians, and most especially the white population, had been hoping that Joshua Nkomo would win the election, as he was considered the more stable of the two candidates. It came as a shock for most whites when Robert Mugabe was announced as the winner, swiftly changing the name of the country to Zimbabwe. The whites who remained were mainly farmers as they stood to lose everything, as the first law Mugabe passed was that anyone leaving Zimbabwe, could take no more than a couple of hundred dollars with them. Those Rhodesians who left the country were virtually penniless.

By 16 March 1980, all of the Monitoring Force had departed from Rhodesia, apart from a small volunteer group (about 40 men) of British infantry instructors who were to train the new Zimbabwe National Army. Three weeks later on 18 April 1980, at a ceremony that was attended by Prince Charles, the Union Jack was lowered for the last time from Government House in Salisbury, and the new African nation of Zimbabwe declared itself independent as a republic within the Commonwealth of Nations.

== Sources ==
- Kaye, C.M.S. Mission Extraordinary Zimbabwe – Rhodesia, British Army Review, 1980.
- Lock, Peter. & Cooke Peter, Fighting Vehicles and Weapons of Rhodesia, P&P Publishing, Wellington, 1995.
- Lovett, John. Contact, Galaxie Press, Salisbury, 1979.
- Moorcroft, Paul. Contact II, Sygma Press, Johannesburg, 1981.
- Subritzky, Mike. Rhodesia – Operational Diary, unpublished, 1979 – 1980.
- Subritzky, Mike. Letters from Comrade Lt. Thomas Sabanda ZIPRA 1980.
