= Zimbabwe United People's Organisation =

Political party in Zimbabwe

Zimbabwe United People's Organisation (ZUPO) was a political party in Zimbabwe, formed on 29 December 1976, shortly after the Geneva Conference. ZUPO was led by Chief Jeremiah Chirau, (President) and Chief Kayisa Ndiweni (vice-president). Both chiefs had served as Cabinet Ministers in the Rhodesian Front government. ZUPO was involved in the negotiation of the Internal Settlement Agreement, and Chief Chirau served as the Chairman of the Executive Council of the Transitional Government.

In November 1978 Chief Ndiweni left ZUPO to form his own party, the United National Federal Party (UNFP).

ZUPO advocated a peaceful and negotiated transition to majority rule, an increase in power to the traditional chiefs, removal of racial discrimination and opposed the nationalisation of industry. ZUPO contested the 1979 election, winning 6.4% of the vote, but failed to win a seat. Support for ZUPO declined following the 1979 election, and it was disbanded before the 1980 election.
