= Prime Minister of Zimbabwe Rhodesia =

Head of government of Zimbabwe Rhodesia

- Flag of the prime minister of Zimbabwe Rhodesia
- Style: The Right Honourable
- Member of: Government of Zimbabwe Rhodesia
- Residence: Dzimbahwe, Salisbury (now Harare)
- Appointer: President of Zimbabwe Rhodesia
- Precursor: Prime Minister of Rhodesia
- Formation: 1 June 1979
- First holder: Abel Muzorewa
- Final holder: Abel Muzorewa
- Abolished: 12 December 1979
- Superseded by: Governor of Southern Rhodesia
- Deputy: Silas Mundawarara

The prime minister of Zimbabwe Rhodesia was the head of government of Zimbabwe Rhodesia. Like the country itself, it was never internationally recognized.

The only prime minister of Zimbabwe Rhodesia was Abel Muzorewa.

== History of the office ==
The position was established on 1 June 1979, under the terms of the Internal Settlement negotiated between the government of Rhodesia and moderate African nationalists. It existed until, under the terms of the Lancaster House Agreement, control was turned over to Christopher Soames as Governor of Southern Rhodesia on 12 December 1979.

== Prime Minister of Zimbabwe Rhodesia (1979) ==
Parties

United African National Council

No.	Portrait	Name (Birth–Death)	Term of office			Political party	Election	Cabinet
No.	Portrait	Name (Birth–Death)	Took office	Left office	Time in office	Political party	Election	Cabinet
1	Abel Muzorewa	Abel Muzorewa (1925–2010); MP for Mashonaland East	1 June 1979	12 December 1979	194 days	UANC	1979	Government

== See also ==
- President of Zimbabwe Rhodesia
- Government of Zimbabwe Rhodesia
- Prime Minister of Rhodesia
- Prime Minister of Zimbabwe
