= Colonial history of Southern Rhodesia =

Period in the history of the former state of Southern Rhodesia

The colonial history of Southern Rhodesia is considered to be a time period from the British government's establishment of the government of Southern Rhodesia on 1 October 1923, to Prime Minister Ian Smith's unilateral declaration of independence in 1965. The territory of 'Southern Rhodesia' was originally referred to as 'South Zambezia' but the name 'Rhodesia' came into use in 1895. The designation 'Southern' was adopted in 1901 and dropped from normal usage in 1964 on the break-up of the Federation of Rhodesia and Nyasaland, and Rhodesia became the name of the country until the creation of Zimbabwe Rhodesia in 1979. Legally, from the British perspective, the name Southern Rhodesia continued to be used until 18 April 1980, when the name Republic of Zimbabwe was formally proclaimed.

== Origin ==
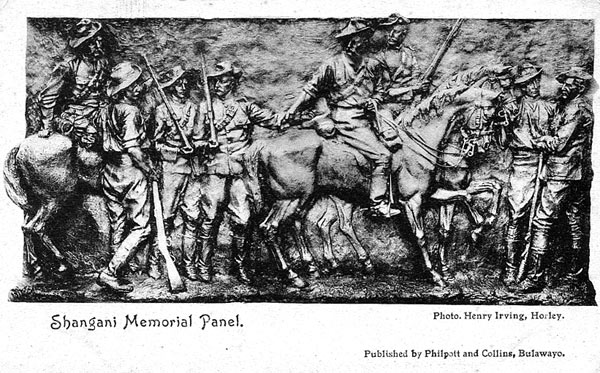
A panel from the Shangani Memorial at World's View in Zimbabwe, c1905

'Rhodesia' was named after Cecil Rhodes, the British empire-builder who was one of the most important figures in British expansion into southern Africa, and who obtained mineral rights in 1888 from the most powerful local traditional leaders through treaties such as the Rudd Concession and the Moffat Treaty signed by King Lobengula of the Ndebele. The British government agreed that Rhodes' company, the British South Africa Company (BSAC), would be granted exclusive mineral rights stretching from the Limpopo to Lake Tanganyika. Queen Victoria signed the charter in 1889. Rhodes used this document in 1890 to justify sending the Pioneer Column, a group of white settlers protected by well-armed British South Africa Police (BSAP) and guided by the big game hunter Frederick Selous, through Matabeleland and into Shona territory to establish Fort Salisbury (now Harare). In 1893–94, with the help of their new maxim guns the BSAP would go on to defeat the Ndebele in the First Matabele War, a war which also resulted in the death of King Lobengula and the death of most of the members of the Shangani Patrol. Shortly after the disastrous Jameson Raid of the BSAP into the Transvaal Republic, the Ndebele were led by their spiritual leader Mlimo against the white colonials and thus began the Second Matabele War (1896–97). After months of bloodshed, Mlimo was found and shot by the American scout Frederick Russell Burnham and soon thereafter Rhodes walked unarmed into the Ndebele stronghold in Matobo Hills and persuaded the impi to lay down their arms, effectively ending the revolt.

In 1899, a Legislative Council was created with a minority of elected seats, through which the BSAC had to pass government measures. The electorate was almost exclusively white settlers, and the proportion of elected seats increased steadily over time. Prior to about 1918, the opinion among the electorate supported continued BSAC rule but opinion changed because of the development of the country and increased settlement. In addition, a decision in the British courts that land not in private ownership belonged to the British crown rather than the BSAC gave great impetus to the campaign for self-government.

== Self-government ==
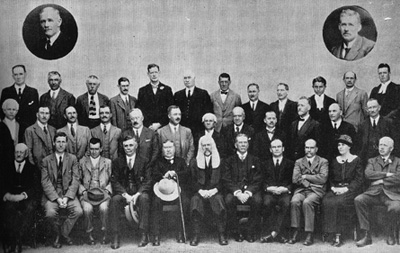
First government after self-rule was established in 1923

Rhodesia retained the Cape Colony system, which gave voting rights to blacks and whites who owned property with a minimum value of £150 or had an annual income of at least £100. Both means tests were accompanied by a simple language test in English. These voting qualifications that ensured de jure equality amongst the races were maintained until 1951, when the financial qualifications were raised. The Southern Rhodesia general election of 29 April 1924, was the first election to the Legislative Assembly of Southern Rhodesia following the grant of responsible government to the colony. It saw a comprehensive victory for the Rhodesia Party, which had been formed by the supporters of responsible government.

From September 1953 to 1963, Southern Rhodesia was part of the multiracial Central African Federation, also known as the Federation of Rhodesia and Nyasaland. The federation was set up in an effort to pool resources and markets. The economy was prosperous at the time due to a post-World War II boom. The African population opposed it because they feared that they would not be able to achieve self-government with the federal structure dominated by white Southern Rhodesians.

The federation fell apart in 1963 after much crisis and turmoil, and Northern Rhodesia and Nyasaland became the independent states of Zambia and Malawi in 1964. Southern Rhodesia reverted to its status as a Crown colony of Britain but was now known as Rhodesia. From 1957 to 1960, the Southern Rhodesia African National Congress, a black led organisation, sought to obtain political control for the black African majority.

The Southern Rhodesian government of Garfield Todd attempted to introduce liberal reforms from 1953 to 1958 to increase the welfare of the black population by increasing educational access for the black majority as well as by providing better housing and healthcare. Todd, however, was forced from power when he attempted to expand the number of blacks eligible to vote from 2% to 16%. Plans were made to dispense with some of the apartheid regulations, providing for more racial equality.

Black discontent had been growing in the rural areas largely because of the disruptive impact of the 1951 Land Husbandry Act. It was designed to enforce private ownership of land and improve the rural economy in the African reserves, which experienced the pressure of a growing population within fixed areas. However, its provisions violated traditional practices. Rather than expand the size of the reserves, the act limited cattle grazing in specified areas and provided for the de-stocking of African herds; it allowed officials to dictate patterns of cultivation and crop growing and to fix dwelling sites on farm land; it prohibited cultivating or grazing without a permit and imposed compulsory labour on unemployed rural Africans. Implementation of the act meant the depletion of highly valued herds, reduction of the land under cultivation, and the forced uprooting of families and entire villages. Discontent with socioeconomic conditions was growing among urban Africans as well. A recession in 1957–1958 hit blacks hard; rising unemployment and inadequate township housing contributed to their sense of deprivation and provided ready-made issues for ANC organizers.

Disturbances in what was Northern Rhodesia in 1959 and the violence against whites in the Belgian Congo and French Congo in early 1959 created a climate of fear amongst the white population. As a consequence, a security crackdown in Rhodesia occurred, which was largely a preemptive strike against further nationalist organising of blacks and against potential African unrest.

The emergency episode proved counterproductive in several respects. It ruined the prospects for genuine racial partnership, made heroes out of the detainees, and alienated moderate Africans from the Government. Indeed, black opposition at this point started to become violent. Repression of the black majority by the white minority had helped to engender the terrorism that would haunt the country for decades. To deflate the crisis atmosphere of the state of emergency and yet preserve its sweeping powers as insurance against the future, the regime sought to normalise the exceptional measures, by incorporating them in statute law. Thus institutionalised, the official emergency came to an end.

== Repressive acts ==
The 1959 Unlawful Organizations Act (UOA) outlawed certain organisations. It proscribed the Northern Rhodesian African National Congress and provided for the banning of additional organisations if their activities were deemed "likely" to disturb public order, "prejudice" the tranquility of the nation, endanger "constitutional government," or "promote feelings of ill will or hostility" between the races. Furthermore, the UOA outlawed any organisation that was "controlled by or affiliated to or participates in the activities or promotes the objects or propagates the opinions of any organization outside the colony". The executive's banning of an organisation was "not open to question in any court of law," and the burden of proving that one was not a member of a banned organisation fell on the accused. Attendance at a meeting or possession of books, writings, accounts, documents, banners, or insignia "relating to an unlawful organization" were prima facie evidence of membership "until the contrary is proved." Prosecution of such offences could be held in camera. Finally, the act provided for the complete indemnification of police and civil servants for actions connected with enforcing the measure. Between 1960 and 1965, 1,610 Africans were prosecuted and 1,002 convicted under this law.

The Preventive Detention Act (PDA) was introduced to continue the detention of ANC members who had been arrested and held without charge during the state of emergency. The act authorised the detention of persons "concerned," "associated," or "supporting" "any of the activities of any organization which led to the present state of emergency" and persons considered "potentially dangerous to public safety or public order." The decision as to whether individuals were "potentially dangerous" was left to the governor, which in practice meant the Minister of Justice and Internal Affairs.

The act established a Review Tribunal—composed of a judge, a magistrate, and a Native Commissioner—to review annually the case of each detainee and recommend release or continued detention. Tribunal proceedings were held in camera; deliberations depended heavily on the evidence of the police Special Branch; and the minister was not obliged to follow the tribunal's recommendations. The tribunal rarely advised the release of detainees, and its lack of objectivity was reflected in its general report on the emergency and detention exercise of 1959, which completely whitewashed the regime's actions. These provisions were widely seen as window dressing to provide legitimacy to the suspension of habeas corpus without any real Judicial Review.

The Native Affairs Amendment Act, was introduced in 1959 to prohibit any "native" from making statements or acting in a way "likely to undermine the authority" of, or bring into "disrepute," governmental officials, chiefs, or headmen. The act abolished meetings of twelve or more "natives" without the permission of the Native Commissioner. Hence, the rural areas became much less accessible to black nationalist organizers. This act severely curtailed the freedom of speech of the majority and made many feel that they had no or very little lawful mechanism of havening their grievances addressed.

== Hardening opposition ==
In January 1960, the National Democratic party (NDP) emerged from the ruins of the ANC. Its goals included universal adult suffrage, higher wages, improvements in African housing and education, and abolition of the Land Apportionment Act and the Land Husbandry Act. Like the ANC, the NDP had a rudimentary organisation, limited resources, and no access to the press; many of its would-be leaders remained behind bars. Given the far-reaching security restrictions passed in 1959, the party's activities were bound within tight parameters. Organizing in rural areas was virtually impossible. In urban areas, however, it was attracting up to ten thousand people to its rallies, and by mid-1961, it had over two hundred fifty thousand dues-paying members.

Intended to paralyse black opposition and prevent political violence, the state of emergency proved a self-fulfilling prophecy. State repression deepened black alienation from the regime and suggested to some that peaceful political organising was a dead end. With the black leadership in detention, the political vacuum was filled by the more militantly inclined. In July and October 1960 large-scale demonstrations and rioting broke out in black townships.

As a result of African impatience with the pace of reforms and then in opposition to increased repression new black political parties had formed. They agitated both politically and violently sometimes resorting to sporadic acts of sabotage. At the forefront of this move was the Zimbabwe African Peoples Union (ZAPU), mostly Ndebele, led by Joshua Nkomo. It was shortly joined by the Zimbabwe African National Union (ZANU), mostly Shona, a breakaway group under Ndabaningi Sithole. After the collapse of the federation in 1963, both ZAPU and ZANU were banned and the majority of their leaders imprisoned.

== 1958 to 1965 ==
From 1958 onwards, white settler politics consolidated and ossified around one issue – resistance to majority rule. The 1961 Constitution governed Southern Rhodesia, and later independent Rhodesia, up until 1969. It used the Westminster Parliamentary System modified by a system of separate voter rolls with differing property and education qualifications. The system ensured that whites had the majority of Assembly seats. In 1962 the Rhodesia Front Party (RF) won the elections under the leadership of Winston Field. It soundly rejected an accommodating solution and sharpened racial polarization. The black majority hoped that the British government would end white minority rule. Against this background the government wanted to pursue independence to forestall black majority rule. Field's Cabinet colleagues, considered him too weak to give Britain an ultimatum on independence and put pressure on him to go. He resigned in April 1964 and was succeeded by Ian Smith, an ardent advocate of unconditional independence. In the 1965 general election, Smith received his mandate to pursue independence vigorously and if necessary illegally and unilaterally. The Rhodesian Front swept 79.3 percent of the vote (up from 56.5 percent in 1962), and its victory confirmed that the old UFP—now the Rhodesia party—was a spent force.

On 11 November 1965, Ian Smith and the RF made a unilateral declaration of independence and the British colony of Southern Rhodesia became the unrecognised state of Rhodesia.

== Brief return to colonial status ==
On 1 June 1979, the white minority that ruled Republic of Rhodesia was briefly replaced by the Republic of Zimbabwe Rhodesia. In preparation for majority rule, the Lancaster House Agreement stipulated that control over the country be returned to the United Kingdom in preparation for elections to be held in the spring of 1980. On 11 December 1979, the Constitution of Zimbabwe-Rhodesia (Amendment) (No. 4) Act received Presidential Assent and Lord Soames arrived the next day to take control. The name of the country formally reverted to Southern Rhodesia at this time, although the name Zimbabwe Rhodesia remained in many of the country's institutions. From 12 December 1979, to 17 April 1980, Zimbabwe Rhodesia was again the British colony of Southern Rhodesia. On 18 April, Southern Rhodesia became the independent Republic of Zimbabwe.
