= Abel Muzorewa =

Zimbabwe Rhodesia's Prime Minister, 1979–1980

Bishop Abel Muzorewa
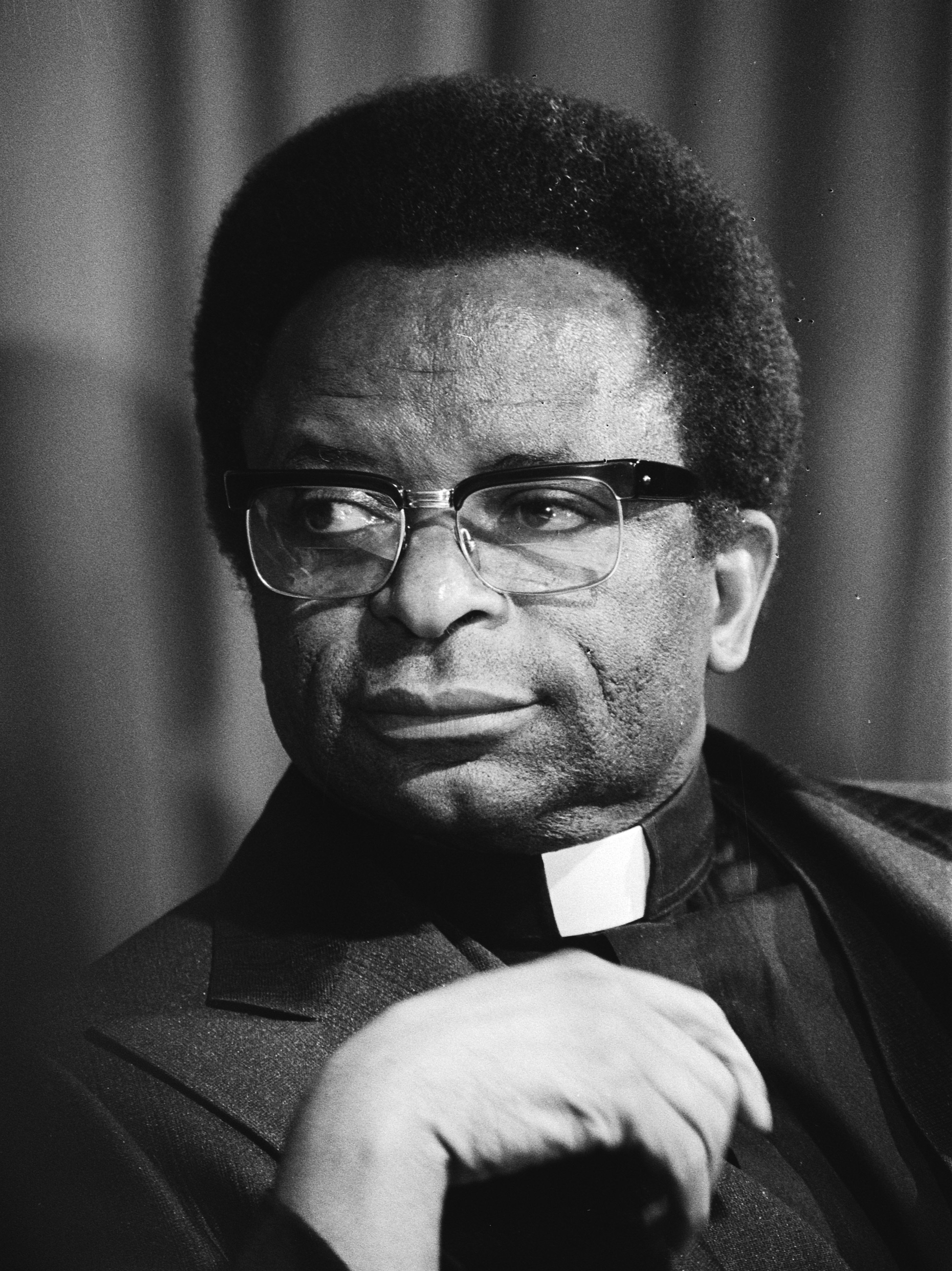
- Muzorewa in 1978

Prime Minister of Zimbabwe Rhodesia
- In office 1 June 1979 – 12 December 1979
- President: Josiah Zion Gumede
- Preceded by: Ian Smith as Prime Minister of Rhodesia
- Succeeded by: Robert Mugabe as Prime Minister of Zimbabwe

Personal details
- Born: Abel Tendekayi Muzorewa; 14 April 1925 Umtali, Manicaland, Southern Rhodesia (now Zimbabwe)
- Died: 8 April 2010 (aged 84) Borrowdale, Harare, Zimbabwe
- Party: United African National Council
- Spouse: Maggie Muzorewa
- Profession: Clergy

Abel Tendekayi Muzorewa (14 April 1925 – 8 April 2010), also commonly referred to as Bishop Muzorewa, was a Zimbabwean bishop and politician who served as the first and only Prime Minister of Zimbabwe Rhodesia from the Internal Settlement to the Lancaster House Agreement in 1979. A United Methodist Church bishop and nationalist leader, he held office for less than a year.

== Early life ==
Muzorewa was the eldest of a lay preacher's five children and was educated at the United Methodist School, Old Umtali, near Mutare. He was a school teacher at Mrewa between 1943 and 1947 before becoming a full-time lay preacher at Mtoko between 1947 and 1949. He then studied theology at Old Umtali Biblical College (1949–1952) and was ordained a Minister at Umtali in August 1953. He was a pastor at Chiduku, near Rusape, from 1955 to 1958.

Muzorewa attended Central College in Fayette, Missouri, later Central Methodist University. By then he had a wife and three sons, who lived with him in prefabricated student housing, while his sons attended a segregated school. His youngest son Wesley and playmate Mark Elrod (son of the college librarian J. McRee Elrod) attempted to integrate the ice cream counter of the local drug store, but were turned away.

When Elrod took Muzorewa to visit Scarritt College for Christian Workers in Nashville, Tennessee, they were turned away from an eating facility, an incident he mentions in his autobiography. However, he later graduated as a Master of Arts from Scarritt (now a conference center).

In July 1963, Muzorewa became pastor of Old Umtali. A year later he was appointed National Director of the Christian Youth Movement and was seconded to the Christian Council. In 1966, he became Secretary of the Student Christian Movement. In 1968, at Masera in Botswana, he was consecrated as the United Methodist Church's Bishop of Rhodesia.

== Political career ==
=== United African National Council ===
In 1971 the British government struck a deal with Ian Smith that provided for a transition to "majority rule" in exchange for an end to sanctions against the government. Muzorewa joined an inexperienced cleric, the Reverend Canaan Banana, to form the United African National Council (UANC) to oppose the settlement, under the acronym NIBMAR (no independence before majority rule).

The proposed referendum was withdrawn and Muzorewa found himself a national leader and an international personality. The government opposition movements—the Zimbabwe African National Union (ZANU) of Reverend Ndabaningi Sithole and the Zimbabwe African People's Union (ZAPU) of Joshua Nkomo—both placed themselves under the UANC umbrella even though they had some doubts when Muzorewa founded a national party.

After ZANU (led by Robert Mugabe after disagreements with Sithole) and ZAPU undertook guerrilla warfare, the UANC was the only legal black party, since it rejected violence.

=== Internal Settlement ===
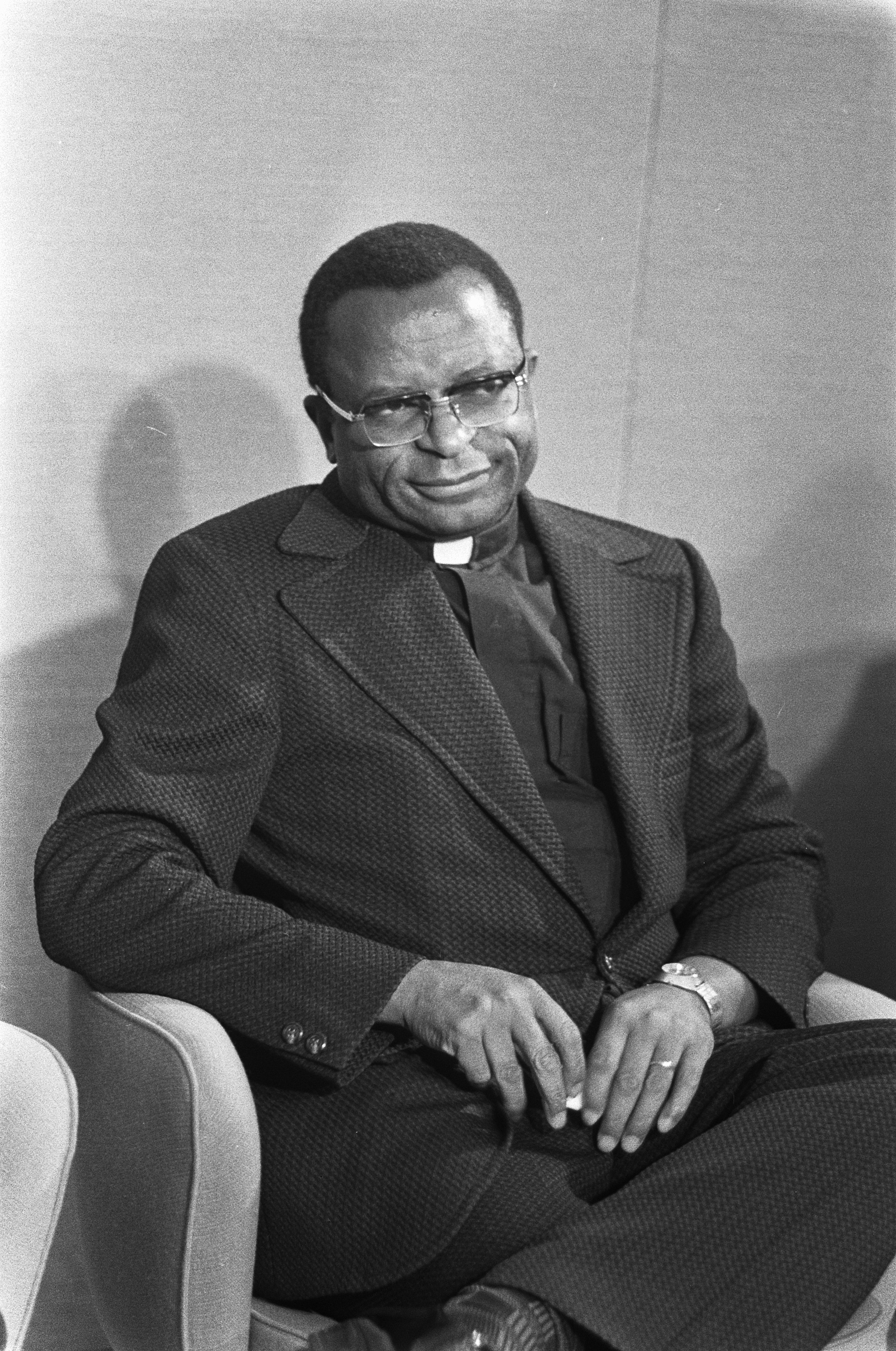
Muzorewa in 1975

On 3 March 1978, Muzorewa, Sithole and other non-exiled leaders signed an agreement at Government House, Salisbury, which paved the way for the interim government, the leadership of which was an Executive Council made up of Muzorewa, Sithole and Jeremiah Chirau, along with Ian Smith.

This Executive Council was to run the affairs of state prior to elections taking place. A new constitution was drafted reserving 10 seats in the Senate and 28 seats in the House of Assembly for the white minority, and a quarter of the Cabinet positions. The constitution was approved in a nearly whites-only referendum that took place in January 1979. An overwhelming majority of 85% voted yes.

Elections were held, and the UANC won. Josiah Gumede was the first President, Muzorewa became prime minister and the country's name was changed to Zimbabwe Rhodesia. However, the war that Smith hoped to stem as a result of the settlement continued unabated. Mugabe and Nkomo rejected the settlement, ending any realistic chance for Muzorewa to gain any international legitimacy. While ZANU and ZAPU could have taken part in the elections if they laid down their arms, they refused to do so. The internal settlement was also condemned by the United Nations Security Council Resolution 423 of 1978, which declared any settlement drafted under the "illegal racist minority regime" to be "illegal and unacceptable".

=== Lancaster House Agreement ===
The British government asked all parties to come to London for negotiations to find a lasting solution to the Bush War. Nkomo and Mugabe attended the conference under the "Patriotic Front" (PF) banner. The conference was held from 10 September to 15 December 1979, under the chairmanship of Lord Carrington, the British Foreign Secretary. Muzorewa was persuaded to accept fresh elections, to be held in early 1980. In accordance with the final agreement, Muzorewa's government revoked the Unilateral Declaration of Independence on 11 December 1979 and dissolved itself. As part of a transition to internationally recognised independence, the country once again became the British colony of Southern Rhodesia pending elections.

Parliamentary elections took place at the end of February 1980, after a campaign filled with much intimidation by Mugabe's ZANU. The British government briefly considered disqualifying ZANU from participating in the elections for flagrant violation of the Lancaster House Agreement, but in the end did nothing. On 4 March 1980, the elections resulted in a majority for Mugabe and ZANU. The UANC won only three out of 80 seats reserved for Africans in the House of Assembly. Under Mugabe, "Zimbabwe Rhodesia" became the Republic of Zimbabwe, or "Zimbabwe".

=== Visit to Israel, arrest and hunger strike ===
Muzorewa visited Israel on 21 October 1983. He urged Mugabe to establish diplomatic relations, saying his political policies hurt Zimbabwe's agriculture and technology industries. The Zimbabwean government arrested Muzorewa on 1 November on charges of conspiring against Mugabe for the South African government. Two days later Mugabe warned Ndabaningi Sithole and Joshua Nkomo against 'conspiring'. Muzorewa then went on a hunger strike, which lasted from 3 to 11 November.

=== 1996 and 2008 presidential elections ===
Muzorewa stood against Mugabe in the presidential election of 1996, but pulled out after the Supreme Court turned down his bid to postpone the elections on the basis that the electoral rules were unfair (as state funds were only available to parties with 15 or more seats in parliament). He remained on the ballot and won 4.8% of the popular vote.

On 21 June 2007, Muzorewa said citizens, black and white alike, came to his house and asked him to run for president. He said Zimbabwe was "bleeding, economically and socially. It is painful to listen to them talk." He asked people to pray that negotiations between ZANU-PF and the MDC, mediated by South African President Thabo Mbeki, would be successful and for Zimbabwe's "salvation". Ultimately Muzorewa did not run in the 2008 presidential election.

== Death and burial ==
Muzorewa died aged 84 from cancer at his home in Harare on 8 April 2010. The Director of Christian Care, Reverend Forbes Matonga, described Muzorewa's legacy as including "his role in the country's transition to independence, the Methodist Church and the founding of Africa University in the eastern Zimbabwean city of Mutare". Political commentator John Makumbe said Muzorewa's legacy in Zimbabwe would be that of "a man of peace".

Bishop Muzorewa and his wife are buried at the Old Mutare Mission Station, Mutare, Manicaland Province.

== See also ==
- List of bishops of the United Methodist Church
- Security Force Auxiliaries

Political offices
Preceded by Ian Smith (of Rhodesia)	Prime Minister of Zimbabwe Rhodesia; 1979-1980	Succeeded by Robert Mugabe (of Zimbabwe)
