= Mbanga =

Mbanga may refer to:

- Mbanga, Cameroon, a town
- Chris Mbanga, a St. John Association official in Zimbabwe
- Prince Mbanga, an African nobleman
- Mbanga soup, a palm fruit soup
- Mbanga language, a dialect of Kaba language

== See also ==
- Mbangassina, a town and commune in Cameroon
- Mbangala language
