= 1980 Southern Rhodesian general election =

- 14 February–4 March 1980

All 100 seats in the House of Assembly 51 seats needed for a majority
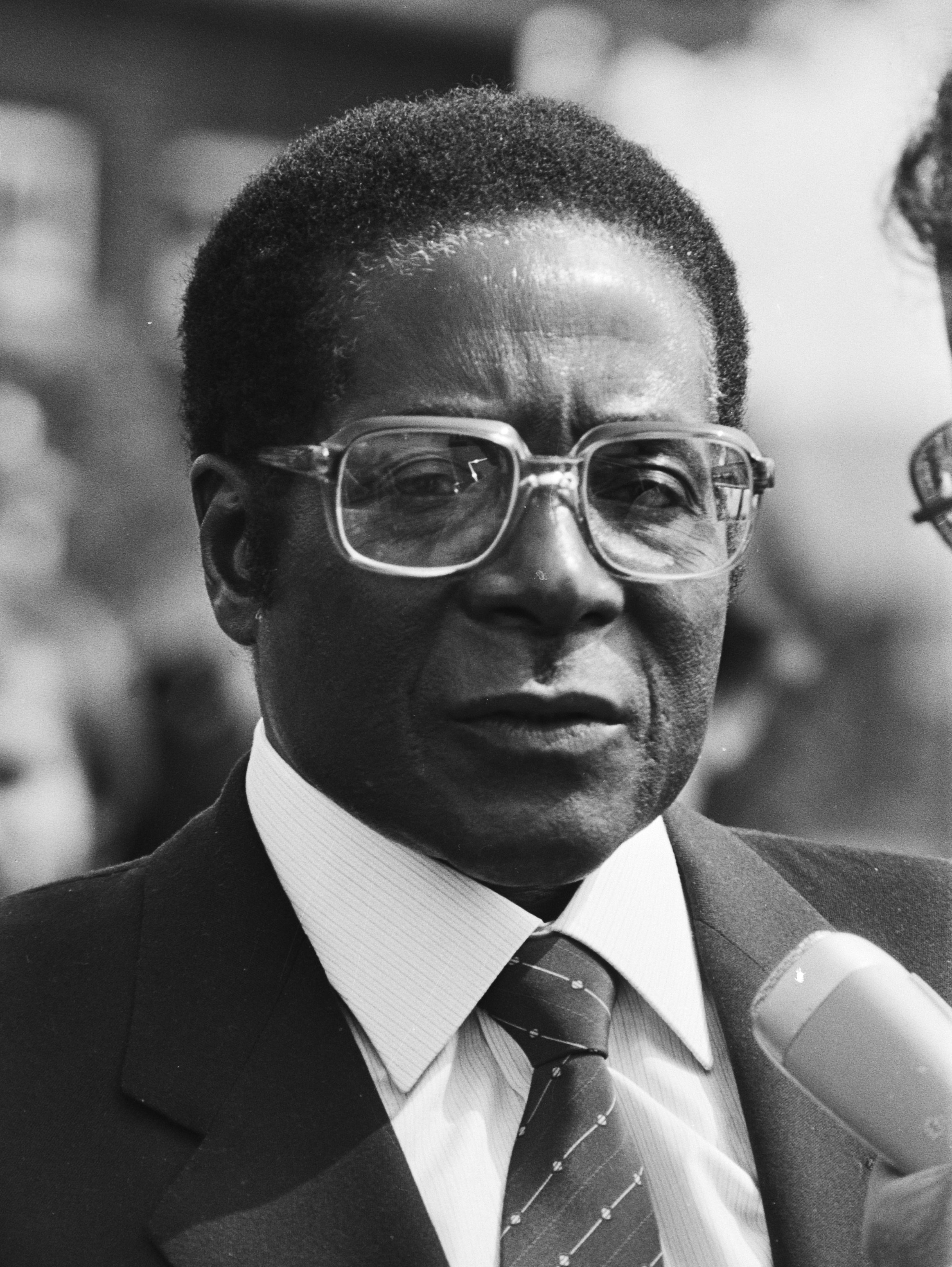

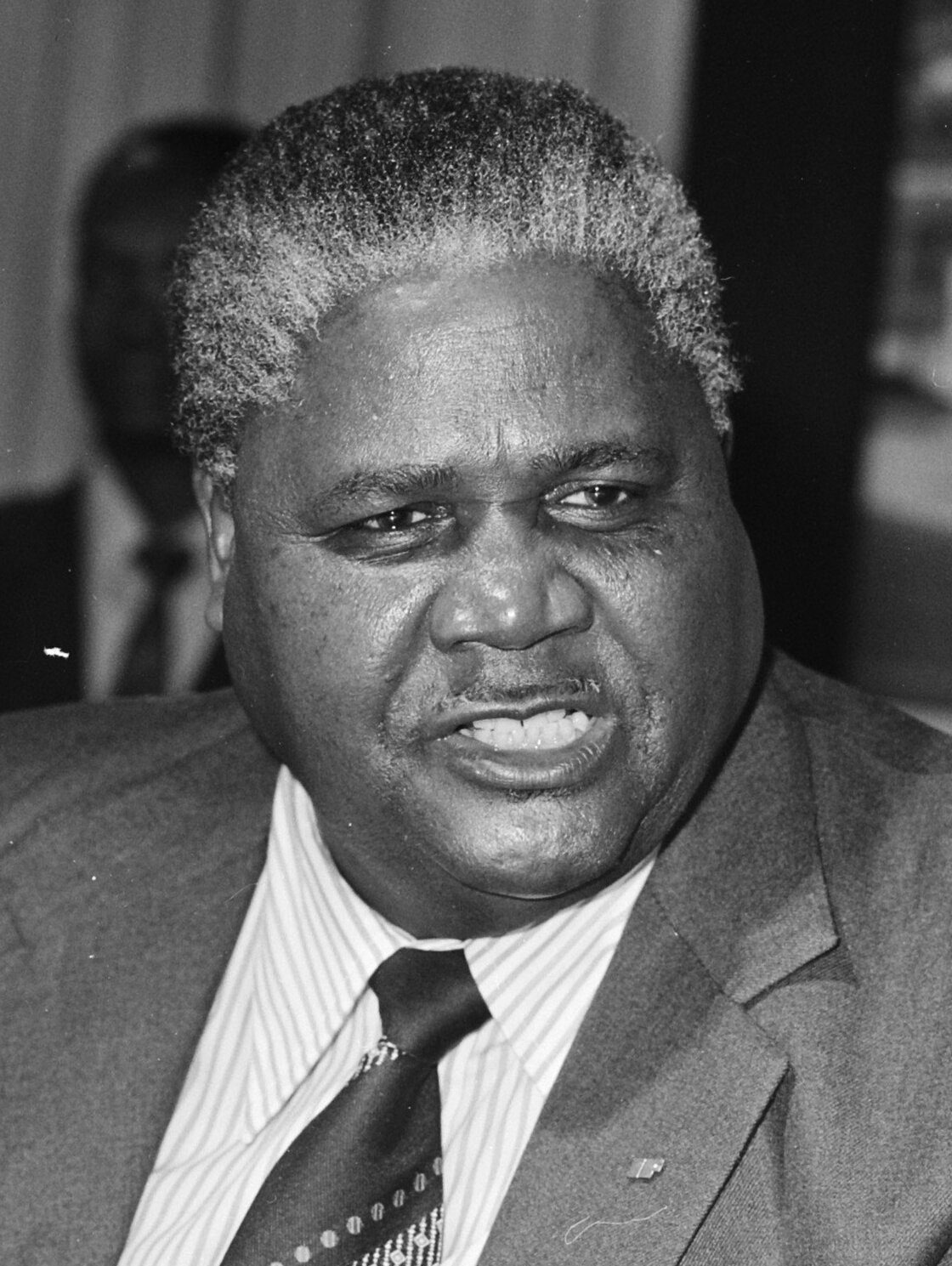

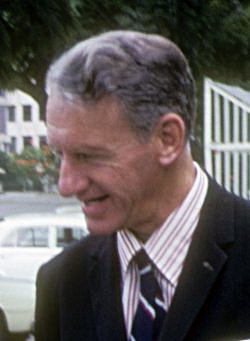

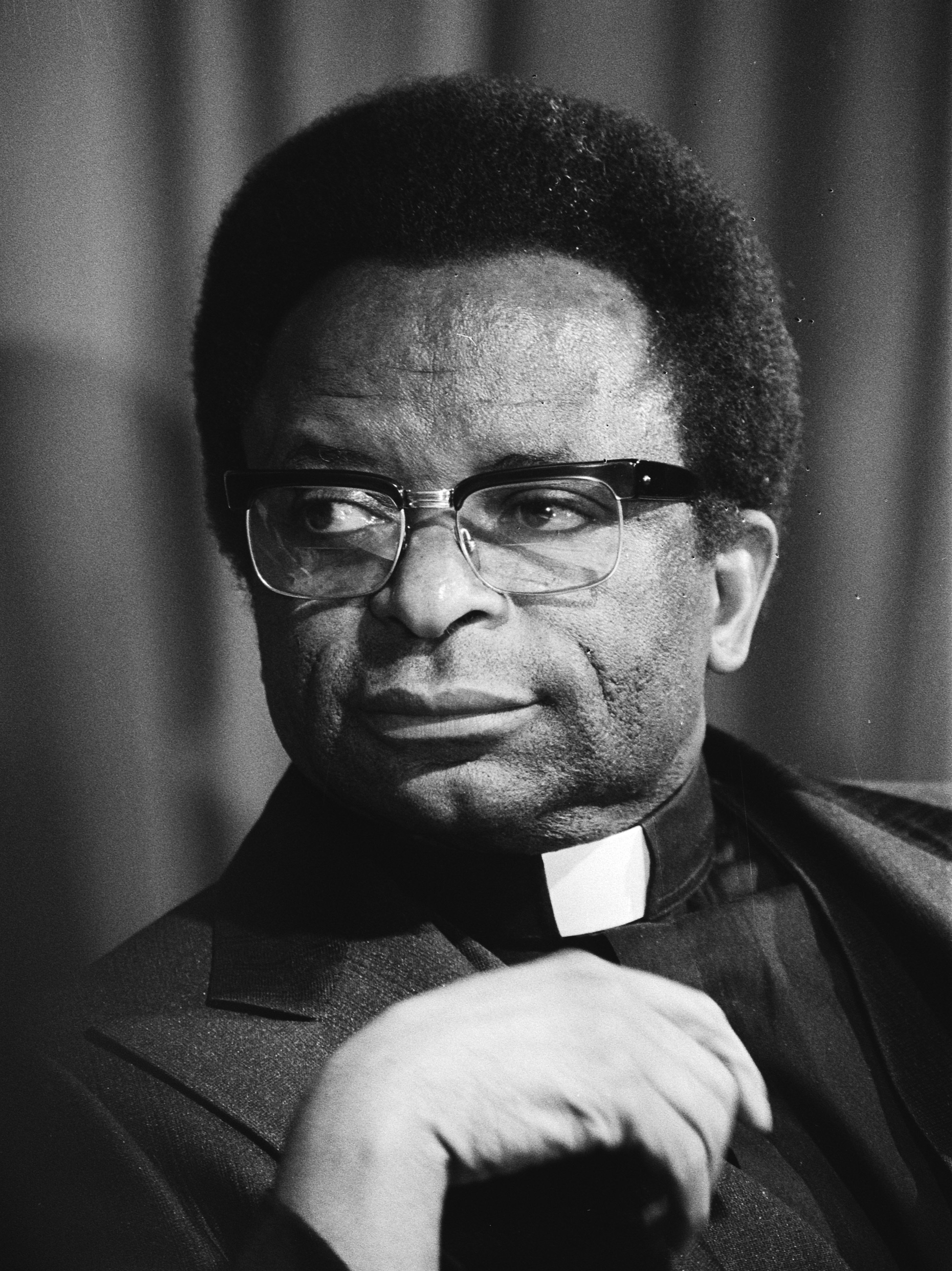
	First party	Second party
Leader	Robert Mugabe	Joshua Nkomo
Party	ZANU–PF	ZAPU
Last election	N/A	N/A
Seats won	57 (Common Roll)	20 (Common Roll)
Seat change	N/A	N/A
Popular vote	1,668,992 (Common Roll)	638,879 (Common Roll)
Percentage	63.0% (Common Roll)	24.1% (Common Roll)
	Third party	Fourth party
Leader	Ian Smith	Abel Muzorewa
Party	RF	UANC
Last election	28 (White Roll)	51
Seats won	20 (White Roll)	3 (Common Roll)
Seat change	▼8	▼48
Popular vote	13,621 (White Roll)	219,307 (Common Roll)
Percentage	83.0% (White Roll)	8.3% (Common Roll)
Prime Minister before election
Abel Muzorewa
UANC
Prime Minister-designate
Robert Mugabe
ZANU–PF

General elections were held in Southern Rhodesia between 14 February and 4 March 1980 to elect the members of the House of Assembly of the first Parliament of the independent Zimbabwe. As stipulated by the new Constitution of Zimbabwe produced by the Lancaster House Conference, the new House of Assembly was to comprise 100 members, 80 of whom would be elected proportionally by province by all adult citizens on a common roll, and 20 of whom would be elected in single-member constituencies by whites on a separate roll.

The result was a victory for Robert Mugabe's ZANU–PF, which won 57 of the 80 common roll seats, giving it a majority in the 100-member House of Assembly. Joshua Nkomo's Zimbabwe African People's Union, contesting the election as the Patriotic Front, won 20 of the 80 common roll seats, with the remaining 3 going to Abel Muzorewa's United African National Council. Ian Smith's Rhodesian Front won all 20 of the white roll seats, with most of its candidates running unopposed. As a result of the election, Robert Mugabe became Zimbabwe's first prime minister upon internationally recognised independence on 11 April 1980.

There was widespread violence during the election.

== Background ==
Agreement at Lancaster House on the fundamentals of the constitution was relatively easy. The new House of Assembly was to comprise 100 members, of whom 80 would be elected on a common roll by every adult citizen. The intention was to move to election in single member constituencies but owing to the lack of an electoral roll and the timescale, the first election was to be conducted by provinces using closed lists put forward by the political parties. Voters had their fingers marked with an invisible ink that showed up under ultraviolet light to detect attempts to vote twice. To qualify for seats in a province, a party needed to achieve a threshold of 10% of the vote, and then the seats among the eligible parties were divided proportionately.

The remaining 20 members of the House of Assembly were to be elected by the 'white roll' comprising those people (mostly white) who had previously qualified to vote. This election was conducted in 20 single member constituencies which had been drawn up by a Delimitation Commission in 1978 and were the same as those used in the 1979 'internal settlement' election. Voters who were registered on the white roll were ineligible to participate in the common roll election.

Following the passage in Zimbabwe Rhodesia of the Constitution of Zimbabwe Rhodesia (Amendment) No. 4 Act 1979 on 11 December 1979, and the arrival of Lord Soames as Governor the next day, the 14-year UDI rebellion came to an end, and Zimbabwe Rhodesia returned to legality under British law as the colony of Southern Rhodesia. The United Kingdom Parliament then passed the Zimbabwe Act to put in place the country's independent constitution. On 21 December 1979, the formal agreement to a ceasefire in the Rhodesian Bush War (or second Chimurenga) was signed; Lord Soames also signed proclamations lifting the ban on ZANU-PF and the Zimbabwe African People's Union and granting a general amnesty to all those who had taken up arms in the war. British Army forces then set up 16 assembly points throughout Southern Rhodesia where Patriotic Front guerillas could disarm and return to civilian life; 18,300 did so by the deadline of 6 January.

While the Rhodesian authorities were in charge of administration on the ground, the formal Returning Officer was Sir John Boynton (1918–2007) who had just retired as chief executive of Cheshire County Council.

== Campaign ==
=== Common roll ===
Over Christmas 1979, many former Patriotic Front soldiers returned to their former homes to prepare for the election. For ZANU-PF, its military leader Josiah Tongogara was killed in a car crash in Mozambique. Tongogara was known to be a supporter of the two Patriotic Front parties, ZANU-PF and ZAPU, fighting the election with a joint list, and it was immediately speculated that his death was arranged by opponents of this policy.

On 13 January, Joshua Nkomo, leader of ZAPU, returned to Southern Rhodesia after three years' exile and addressed a rally of between 100,000 and 150,000 at Highfield township in Salisbury. He was followed on 27 January by Robert Mugabe of ZANU-PF, who addressed 200,000 (the crowd would have been larger had organisers not turned some away for safety reasons).

Abel Muzorewa, who had led the unity government of Zimbabwe Rhodesia, campaigned vigorously on behalf of his United African National Council which had won the most votes the previous year. However, attendance at his rallies was reported to be poor, and Muzorewa's habit of inveighing against other Zimbabwean politicians was thought to detract from his appeal as a man of unity. James Chikerema, who had fallen out with Muzorewa in June 1979, entered the field with his Zimbabwe Democratic Party which grew increasingly close to ZAPU (he held unity talks with Nkomo); Chikerema complained about intimidation by supporters of ZANU-PF.

ZANU-PF presented a moderate manifesto that showed little of the party's professed alliance with communist China, although party speakers often threatened that the war might continue if the party did not win. The party complained bitterly to Lord Soames about official bias against it. The Registrar-General of Elections refused to put the party's intended logo on ballot papers because it contained an image of an AK47 rifle and he considered it detrimental to public order. ZANU-PF posters were confiscated if they were considered inflammatory, and many party activists and some candidates were arrested. Soames responded by accusing ZANU-PF of intimidating voters in 23 out of the 56 districts of the colony.

ZAPU caused something of a stir by deciding to fight the elections under the name "Patriotic Front". They campaigned most heavily in the Ndebele areas, where the ZAPU army, ZIPRA, made particular strides in trying to integrate with the Southern Rhodesian forces.

=== White roll ===
Comparatively little interest was shown in the election for the 20 white roll seats, partly because those elected were unlikely to have much influence in the independent Zimbabwe, but mostly because all seats were expected to be won easily by the Rhodesian Front under Ian Smith. Fourteen out of the twenty seats were filled unopposed, and only two candidates in the other seats could put up a reasonable challenge to the Rhodesian Front candidate. One was Dr Timothy Stamps, a newcomer to politics, in the Kopje constituency covering the centre of Salisbury. Stamps advocated co-operation with the new black-led government. In addition, Nick McNally, who had led the liberal 'National Unifying Force' which opposed white dominance, ran in Mount Pleasant in the Salisbury suburbs.

Twelve out of the 20 Rhodesian Front candidates were reported to favour merging their party with Muzorewa's United African National Council to create a biracial party, following their experience in government together in Zimbabwe Rhodesia. White opinion was generally supportive of Muzorewa's government for including competent Ministers, and hoped that Muzorewa would win enough common roll seats to deprive ZANU–PF of a majority.

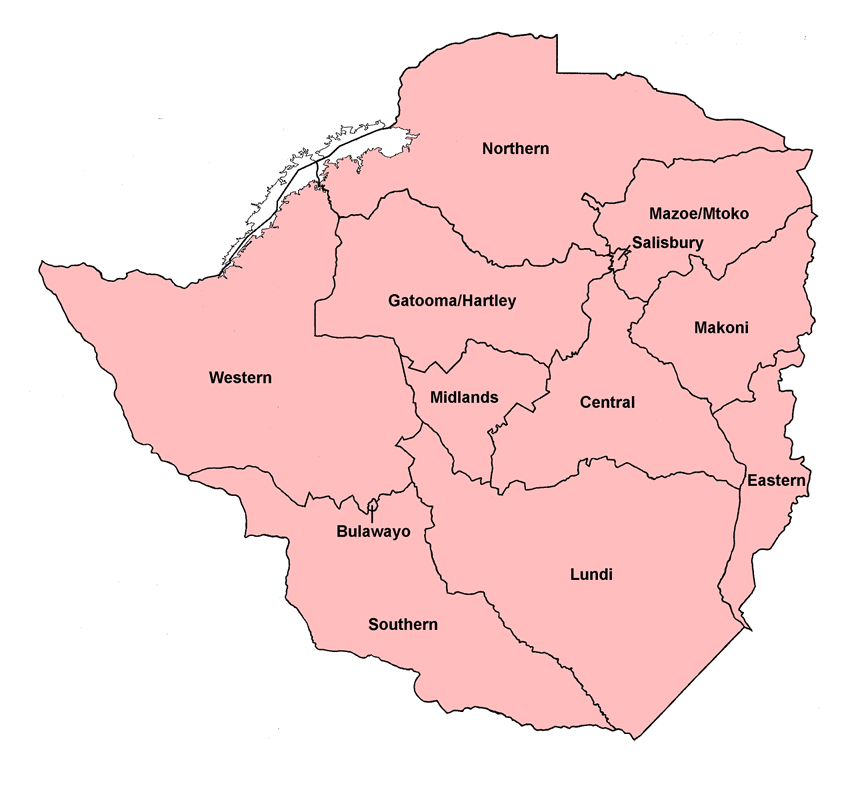
Rural constituencies.

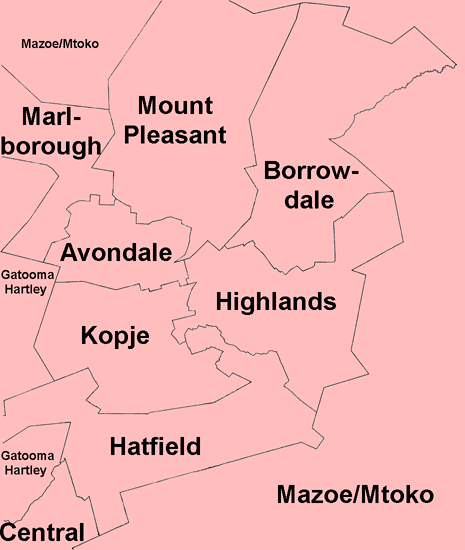
Constituencies in Salisbury.

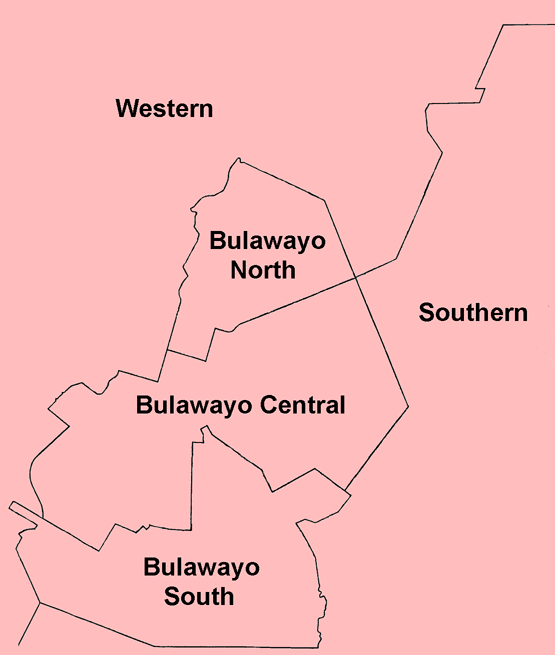
Constituencies in Bulawayo.

== Results ==
Graph of the party split among 100 seats.
Party	Common roll			White roll			Total seats
Party	Votes	%	Seats	Votes	%	Seats	Total seats
ZANU–PF	1,668,992	62.99	57				57
ZAPU	638,879	24.11	20				20
United African National Council	219,307	8.28	3				3
ZANU–Ndonga	53,343	2.01	0				0
Zimbabwe Democratic Party	28,181	1.06	0				0
National Front of Zimbabwe	18,794	0.71	0				0
National Democratic Union	15,056	0.57	0				0
Rhodesian Front				13,621	83.04	20	20
United National Federal Party	5,796	0.22	0				0
United People's Association of Matabeleland	1,181	0.04	0				0
Independents				2,781	16.96	0	0
Total	2,649,529	100.00	80	16,402	100.00	20	100
Valid votes	2,649,529	98.05					
Invalid/blank votes	52,746	1.95					
Total votes	2,702,275	100.00					
Registered voters/turnout				29,566	–		
Source: African Elections Database

=== Provincial common roll results ===
Province	NDU		NFZ		PF-ZAPU			UANC			ZANU-N		ZANU-PF			ZDP		Other parties
Province	Votes	%	Votes	%	Votes	%	Seats	Votes	%	Seats	Votes	%	Votes	%	Seats	Votes	%	Votes (%)
Manicaland (11)	1,837	0.6	1,283	0.4	4,992	1.6	–	19,608	6.2	–	16,843	5.4	263,972	84.1	11	5,251	1.7	–
Mashonaland Central (6)	1,216	0.7	1,086	0.6	3,947	2.3	–	14,985	8.6	–	3,671	2.1	146,665	83.8	6	2,446	1.4	UNFP 914 (0.5%)
Mashonaland East (16)	2,359	0.4	1,668	0.3	28,805	4.6	–	75,237	11.9	2	9,499	1.5	508,813	80.5	14	4,466	0.7	UNFP 1,593 (0.3%)
Mashonaland West (8)	2,211	0.8	2,589	0.9	37,888	13.4	1	28,728	10.2	1	4,688	1.7	203,567	71.9	6	3,261	1.2	–
Matabeleland North (10)	1,840	0.5	4,517	1.1	313,435	79.0	9	30,274	7.6	–	3,218	0.8	39,819	10.0	1	1,333	0.3	UNFP 1,340 (0.3%); UPAM 729 (0.2%)
Matabeleland South (6)	927	0.5	2,494	1.4	148,745	86.4	6	5,615	3.3	–	694	0.4	11,787	6.8	–	775	0.5	UNFP 619 (0.4%); UPAM 452 (0.3%)
Midlands (12)	2,218	0.6	3,087	0.9	94,960	27.1	4	30,245	8.6	–	5,792	1.7	209,092	59.7	8	3,387	1.0	UNFP 1,330 (0.4%)
Victoria (11)	2,448	0.7	2,070	0.6	6,107	1.9	–	14,615	4.5	–	8,938	2.7	285,277	87.3	11	7,262	2.2	–

=== White roll constituency results ===
Polling day was 14 February 1980. A dagger (†) indicates a member of the Zimbabwe Rhodesia House of Assembly for that constituency. A double dagger (‡) indicates a white non-constituency member.

Constituency	Candidate	Party	Votes	%
Avondale	†John Landau	Rhodesian Front	unopposed	
Borrowdale	†David Colville Smith	Rhodesian Front	unopposed	
Bulawayo Central	†Patrick Francis Shields	Rhodesian Front	unopposed	
Bulawayo North	†Denis Walker	Rhodesian Front	unopposed	
Bulawayo South	†Wally Stuttaford	Rhodesian Front	3,715	92.0
Bulawayo South	Francis Robert Bertrand	Independent	289	7.2
Bulawayo South	Jan (John) Francis Betch	Independent	36	0.9
Central	†Rowan Cronjé	Rhodesian Front	unopposed	
Eastern	†Desmond Butler	Rhodesian Front	unopposed	
Gatooma/Hartley	†P. K. van der Byl	Rhodesian Front	unopposed	
Hatfield	†Richard Cartwright	Rhodesian Front	unopposed	
Highlands	Robert Gaunt	Rhodesian Front	unopposed	
Kopje	†Dennis Divaris	Rhodesian Front	1,999	65.5
Kopje	Timothy Stamps	Independent	1,053	34.5
Lundi	†Donald Goddard	Rhodesian Front	unopposed	
Makoni	Arthur Tapson	Rhodesian Front	1,396	76.4
Makoni	Petrus Christophel van der Merwe	Independent	431	23.6
Marlborough	†William Irvine	Rhodesian Front	unopposed	
Mazoe/Mtoko	‡André Sothern Holland	Rhodesian Front	unopposed	
Midlands	†Henry Swan Elsworth	Rhodesian Front	unopposed	
Mount Pleasant	†Jonas Christian Andersen	Rhodesian Front	2,683	79.4
Mount Pleasant	Nicholas John McNally	Independent	698	20.6
Northern	†Esmond Meryl Micklem	Rhodesian Front	unopposed	
Southern	†Ian Smith	Rhodesian Front	2,253	93.8
Southern	Johannes Jacobus Hulley	Independent	113	4.7
Southern	Donovan Peter Speedie	Independent	37	1.5
Western	†Alexander Moseley	Rhodesian Front	1,579	92.7
Western	Lawrence Alastair Bronson	Independent	124	7.3

== Accuracy ==
"The Election Commissioner concluded that, despite some distortion of voting as a result of intimidation in certain areas, the overall result would broadly reflect the wishes of the people."

"These Commonwealth observers also knew that intimidation could be overt, or subtle and covert; but there was a limited amount they could do about this. "
