= Jeremiah Chirau =

American politician (1923–1985)

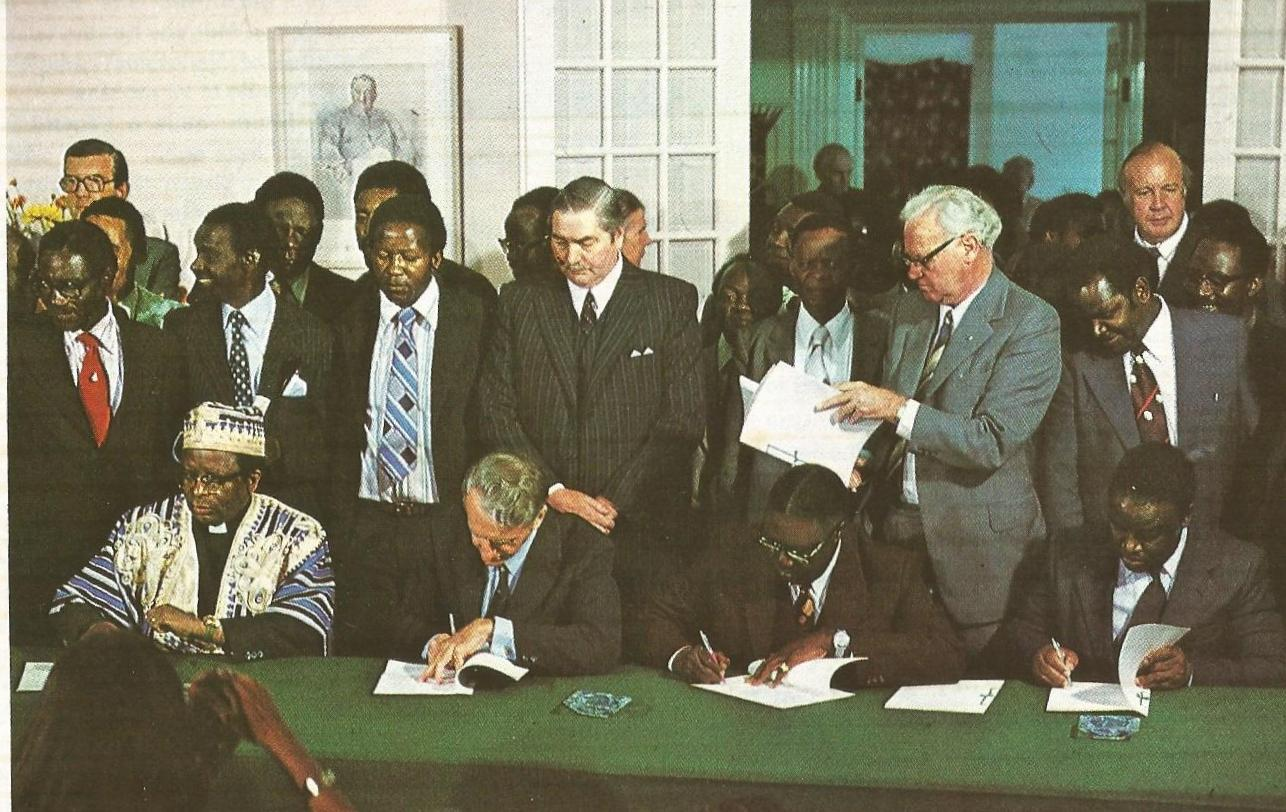
Chirau (second from right) signing the Internal Settlement on 3 March 1978.

Chief Jeremiah Sikireta Chirau, ICD (6 June 1923 – 27 January 1985) was a notable figure among Rhodesia's chiefs, and during the UDI he became the only leader of the Zimbabwe United People's Organisation (ZUPO), a party largely comprising chiefs.

Born near Makonde, he was awarded a medal for service in World War II. A staunch traditionalist, he was well versed in African customary law. In 1961 he was appointed acting chief, and eventually rose to chiefship of the communal lands of the Chirau people. Elected to the Council of Chiefs, he became its president in 1973, a position he held until his death. He entered politics in 1970 when he was elected into the Senate. He formed ZUPO in 1976 and was a signatory to the Internal Settlement. Secret Service contested the resulting elections but failed to win any seats and was subsequently disbanded.

== Bibliography ==
- (1976). "Backgrounds of the Four Tribal Leaders." New York Times. 29 April.
- Darnton, John (1976). "Rhodesians Decry Naming of Chiefs." New York Times. 5 May.
- (1978). "Jeremiah Chirau." The Globe and Mail. 27 March.
- Mungazi, Dickson (2000). In the Footsteps of the Masters: Desmond M. Tutu and Abel T. Muzorewa. Westport: Praeger.
- Ottoway, David (1978). "White Rule Ends Quietly in Rhodesia." Washington Post. 22 March.
