= Andre Sothern Holland =

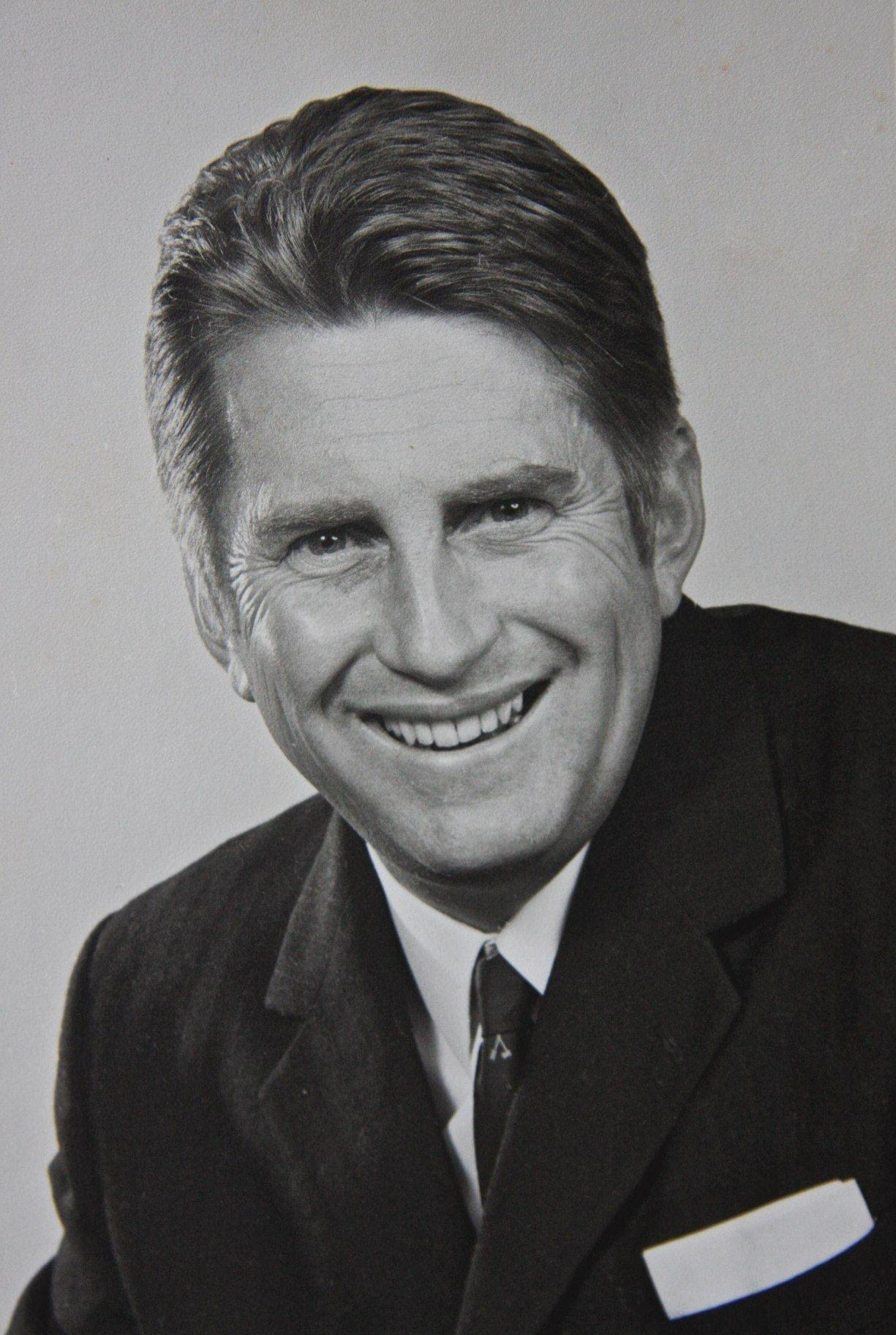
- Born: 30 January 1931; Rhodesia
- Died: 8 August 2014 (aged 83); Zimbabwe
- Occupations: Farmer and Politician

Andre Sothern Holland was a farmer and politician in Southern Rhodesia (Zimbabwe) in the 1970s and 1980s.

== Personal life ==
Holland had three children in Rhodesia with his wife Susan Jessica (Browning) Holland.

His South African grandfather, Arthur Herbert was personal secretary to Cecil Rhodes

His South African grandmother, Madeleine Holland, was a poet and academic who studied the Bantu of modern-day of central and Southern Africa.

== Career ==
Described as a "prominent member of Parliament" in April, 1981, Andre started his political career as an MP under Ian Smith's Government in 1970. He was known to believe in closing the wealth and land ownership gap between the white and black populations of Rhodesia.

Following the change of geographic political boundaries (in which Southern Rhodesia became Zimbabwe) in 1979, Andre split from Ian Smith's party, the Rhodesian Front, to form an alternative. On April 21, 1981, The New York Times described this new party to be one more suited for the "liberal whites" of Zimbabwe.

Following his resignation from the Rhodesian Front due to differing values, Holland noticed much support from his constituents, leading to the formation of the new party, the Democratic Party. He announced he planned to challenge the Rhodesian Front in upcoming elections. However, after a year of campaigning and three lost elections, the Democratic Party was disbanded.
