= John Landau =

Rhodesian politician (1930–2009)

John A. Landau

Chief Scout of the Scout Association of Rhodesia

John Alfred Landau (21 January 1930 – February 2009) was a Rhodesian and Zimbabwean politician. He was also active in scouting, including as the Chief Scout of the Scout Association of Rhodesia.

== Political career ==
Born in Bulawayo, into a prominent Jewish family, Landau was a Rhodesian Front and Republican Front MP and whip, until resigning from the party in 1982. He was a deputy minister until being dismissed by Robert Mugabe in 1985.

== Scouting ==
In 1966, Landau was the President of the Rhodesian Baseball and Softball League. In 1972, Landau was the manager of the Rhodesian Baseball team that competed in South Africa's inter-provincial tournament.

In 1975, he was head of the Rhodesian contingent at the 14th World Scout Jamboree in Norway.

Landau was the Chief Scout of Rhodesia while holding parliamentary office, and played a role in the transitional government. In 2005, he was a member of the World Organization of the Scout Movement African Scout Committee for Honors.

In 1992, Landau was awarded the 222nd Bronze Wolf, the only distinction of the WOSM, awarded by the World Scout Committee for exceptional services to world Scouting.

== Death ==
Landau died in South Africa in February 2009, at the age of 79.
