= United National Federal Party =

Political party in Zimbabwe

United National Federal Party (UNFP) was a political party in Zimbabwe, formed in November 1978 by Chief Kayisa Ndiweni, who had been a leading figure in the Zimbabwe United People's Organisation. UNFP contested the 1979 election and won 9 seats, mostly in the Matabeleland provinces. It failed to win any seats in the 1980 election.
