= 1979 Rhodesian general election =

- 10 April 1979 (white roll); 21 April 1979 (common roll)

All 100 seats in the House of Assembly
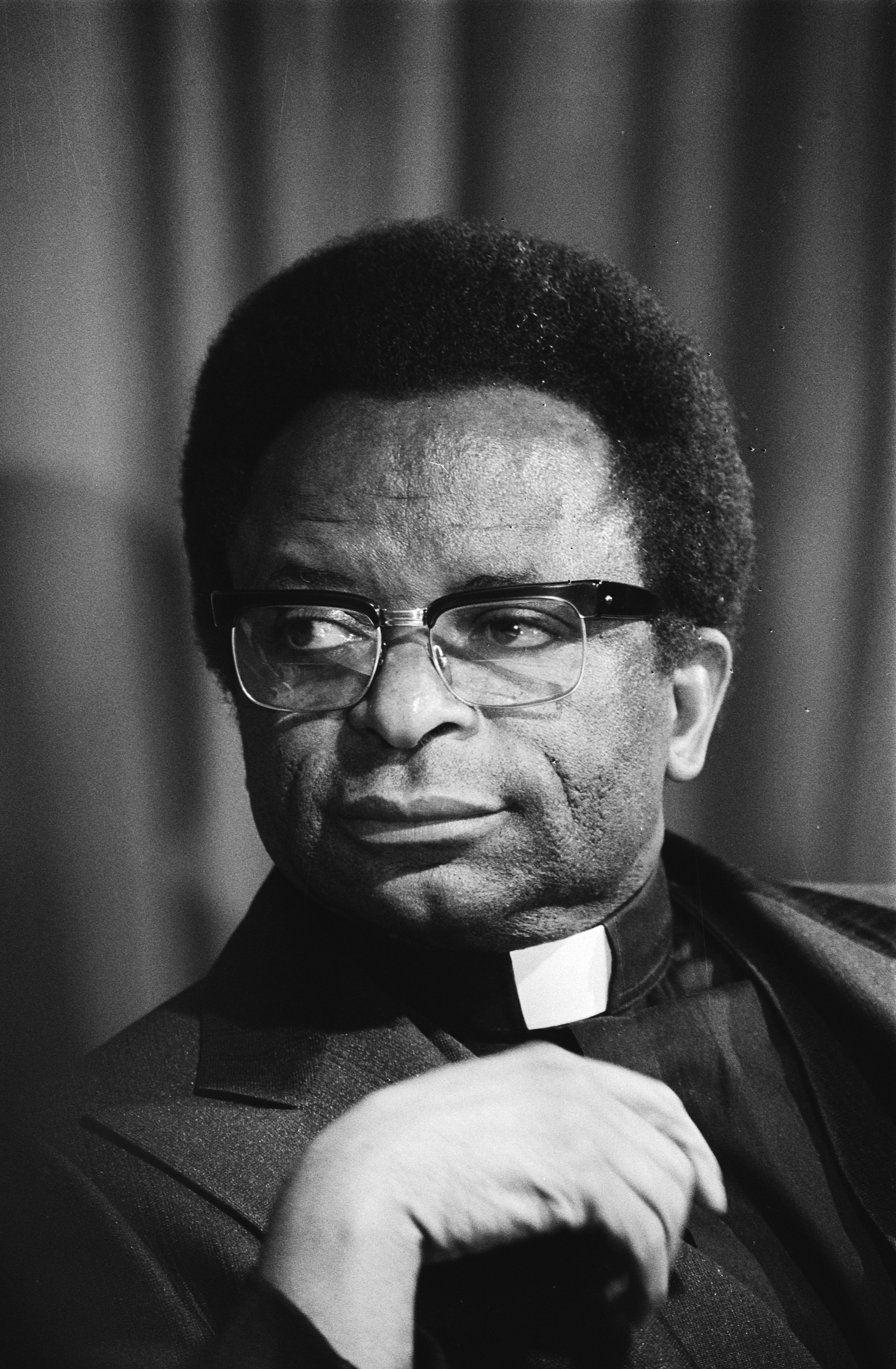

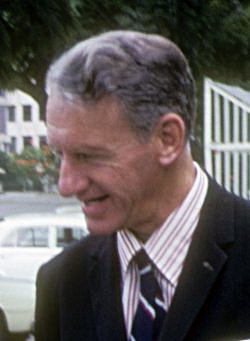
	First party	Second party
Leader	Abel Muzorewa	Ian Smith
Party	UANC	RF
Leader's seat	Mashonaland East	Southern
Last election	–	50
Seats won	51	28
Seat change	New	▼22
Popular vote	1,212,639 (Common Roll)	11,613 (White Roll)
Percentage	67.3%	81.2%
	Third party	Fourth party
Leader	Ndabaningi Sithole	Kayisa Ndiweni
Party	ZANU–Ndonga	UNFP
Leader's seat	Manicaland
Last election	–	–
Seats won	12	9
Seat change	New	New
Popular vote	262,928 (Common Roll)	194,446 (Common Roll)
Percentage	14.6%	6.4%
- Election results for each roll by their subdivisions
Prime Minister before election
Ian Smith
RF
Prime Minister-designate
Abel Muzorewa
UANC

General elections were held in Rhodesia in April 1979, the first where the majority black population elected the majority of seats in parliament. The elections were held following the Internal Settlement negotiated by the Rhodesian Front government of Ian Smith and were intended to provide a peaceful transition to majority rule on terms not harmful to White Rhodesians. In accordance with the Internal Settlement, on 1 June, Rhodesia officially became the nation of Zimbabwe Rhodesia, under the government of the United African National Council elected in the 1979 elections. The Internal Settlement was not approved internationally but the incoming government under Bishop Abel Muzorewa did decide to participate in the Lancaster House talks which led to the end of the dispute and the creation of Zimbabwe.

== Electoral system ==
Under the agreement of 1978, the new Zimbabwe Rhodesia House of Assembly was to consist of 100 members. 20 were to be elected on the old roll with property, income and education qualifications, which most black citizens did not meet, and which was previously used to elect the majority of the Rhodesia House of Assembly. 72 seats were elected by the "Common Roll" which every adult in the country had a vote. Owing to the lack of an electoral roll, voters were instead marked with ink on their fingers to stop multiple voting. Once the 92 members had been elected, they assembled to vote for eight White non-constituency members. All the candidates for these posts were members of the Rhodesian Front.

The 20 White Roll members were elected from new constituencies made up of combinations of the previous constituencies. The Common Roll members were elected by province using a closed list system. It was intended to set up a full electoral register and institute single-member constituencies for future elections.

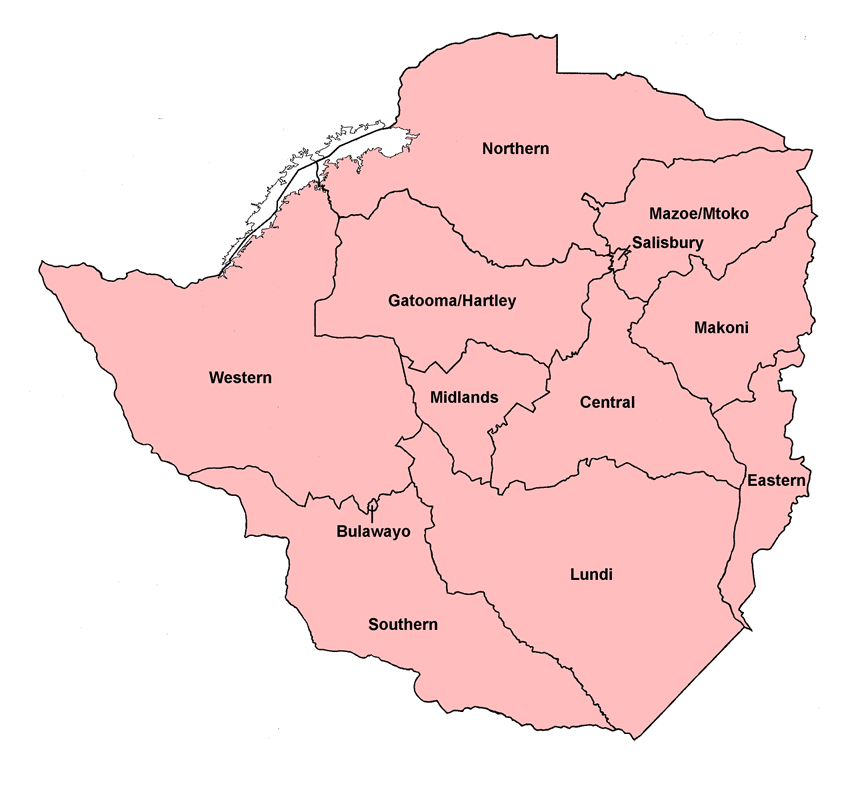
Rural constituencies.

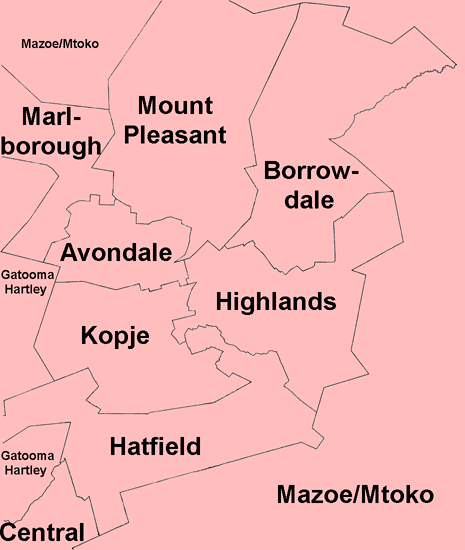
Constituencies in Salisbury.

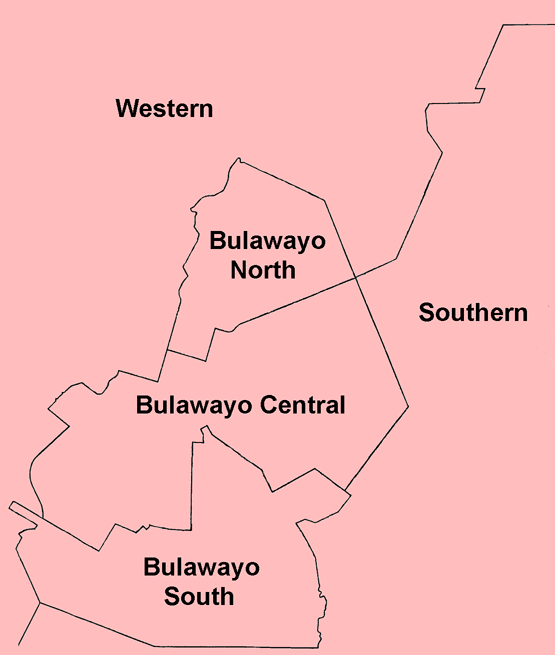
Constituencies in Bulawayo.

== Campaign ==
The main question in the election campaign was how many Africans would vote in the common roll election. The Patriotic Front parties, Zimbabwe African National Union and Zimbabwe African People's Union, pledged to disrupt the election and called for a boycott. By 1979, all of Rhodesia apart from the central area between Salisbury and Bulawayo was under a form of martial law due to the war between the Rhodesian government and the Patriotic Front's armies, the Zimbabwe African National Liberation Army (ZANLA) and Zimbabwe People's Revolutionary Army (ZIPRA).

In the event the turnout was quite respectable in Mashonaland, although somewhat depressed in Manicaland and Victoria. In Matabeleland South, where ZIPRA was strongest, the turnout was lowest.

== Conduct ==
Neither the nine-member Freedom House observer team or any other international observer teams reported any 'serious irregularities surrounding the counting or tabulation of the poll.' The subsequent Freedom House report noted that all major parties which wished to participate were free to nominate candidates and that any pressures to vote for a particular party 'did not affect the final returns sufficiently to discredit the general results of the elections.' The report concluded that, although the election was not 'fully democratic', 'Rhodesia had never had so inclusive and free an election'.

== Results ==
Graph of the party split among 100 seats.
Party	Common roll			White roll			Seats	
Party	Votes	%	Seats	Votes	%	Seats	Appointed	Total
United African National Council	1,212,639	67.27	51				0	51
Zimbabwe African National Union – Ndonga	262,928	14.58	12				0	12
United National Federal Party	194,446	10.79	9				0	9
Zimbabwe United People's Organisation	114,570	6.36	0				0	0
National Democratic Union	18,175	1.01	0				0	0
Rhodesian Front				11,613	81.98	20	8	28
Independent				2,552	18.02	0	0	0
Total	1,802,758	100.00	72	14,165	100.00	20	8	100
Valid votes	1,802,758	96.45						
Invalid/blank votes	66,319	3.55						
Total votes	1,869,077	100.00						
Registered voters/turnout	2,900,000	64.45						
Source: African Elections Database, Freedom House

=== Common roll ===
Polling day was 21 April 1979.

Province	Est. electorate	NDU			UANC			UNFP			ZANU			ZUPO		
Province	Est. electorate	Votes	%	Seats	Votes	%	Seats	Votes	%	Seats	Votes	%	Seats	Votes	%	Seats
Manicaland (10)	402,700	–	–	–	97,994	53.7	6	8,398	4.6	–	69,136	37.9	4	7,115	3.9	–
Mashonaland Central (5)	187,800	–	–	–	138,360	80.7	5	9,598	5.6	–	16,968	9.9	–	6,582	3.8	–
Mashonaland East (15)	588,300	18,175	3.3	–	428,599	78.2	15	20,292	3.7	–	39,461	7.2	–	41,767	7.6	–
Mashonaland West (6)	264,300	–	–	–	245,737	83.4	6	12,941	4.4	–	24,682	8.4	–	11,228	3.8	–
Matabeleland North (10)	383,400	–	–	–	79,108	40.8	5	75,350	38.9	4	22,242	11.5	1	16,985	8.8	–
Matabeleland South (5)	191,200	–	–	–	10,318	20.0	1	30,318	58.9	3	7,365	14.3	1	3,502	6.8	–
Midlands (11)	419,600	–	–	–	137,120	60.6	7	24,006	10.6	1	47,525	21.0	3	17,551	7.8	–
Victoria (10)	388,900	–	–	–	75,403	56.1	6	13,543	10.1	1	35,549	26.5	3	9,840	7.3	–

==== Candidates and elected members ====
NDU	UANC	UNFP	ZANU	ZUPO
MANICALAND PROVINCE
	1. Edward Stewart Mazaiwana	1. A. Siwellah	1. Rev. Ndabaningi Sithole	1. P. Ndoro
	2. David Charles Zvinaiye Mukome	2. C. Jenah	2. Noel Mukono	2. P. Mubekati
	3. Simpson Victor Mtambenengwe	3. G. Gwenzi	3. David Zamchiya	3. T. Makunde
	4. Elijah Smile Magavan Nyandoro	4. L. Chiyangwa	4. Arnold Sawanha	4. N. Chingomo
	5. John Moses Chirimbani	5. E. Matsika	5. D. Charangwa	5. L. Mufararipwa
	6. Maxwell Pfereyegota Chambara	6. K. Dhlamini	6. [C. Chiremba (deceased)]	6. J. Tandi
	7. John Zwenhamo Ruredzo	7. J. Manjengwa	7. Miss Vesta Saungweme	7. A. Katso
	8. P. Chakaza	8. A. Moyo	8. R. Chikosi	8. R. Hlatiwayo
	9. M. Chingwara	9. T. Meda	9. W. Chadokwa	9. D. Jamela
	10. Kagoro Felix Kadzombe	10. J. Dhliwayo	10. Mrs S. Nduku	10. Mrs P. Nyahe
MASHONALAND CENTRAL PROVINCE
	1. Mucheki Kachidzwa	1. R. Madanire	1. Dr N. Munyoro	1. N. Mutuma
	2. Reki Mashayamombe	2. D. Panashe	2. E. Charirye	2. S. Chimanikire
	3. Micheck Nyika Chagadama	3. A. Nyandoro	3. L. Masawi	3. K. Chitsike
	4. Actor Mupinyuri	4. R. Chiwaridza	4. C. Katsande	4. S. Chipiro
	5. Terrence Mashambanhaka	5. B. Chasi	5. B. Gambanga	5. S. Moyo
MASHONALAND EAST PROVINCE
1. Henry Chihota	1. Abel Muzorewa	1. Kingdom Sithole	1. Joel Mandaza	1. Leonard Mapuranga
2. James Clever Mavunga Shereni	2. Silas Mundawarara	2. Ben Chanetsa	2. Dr Joseph Gopo	2. Alice Chinamora
3. Rosten Gore	3. Simon Chivaware Paraffin*	3. Cyril Kachidza	3. Abel Rumano	3. Patrick Bwanya
4. X. Mutendere	4. Claudius Nhongonhema	4. Robert Kachindamoto	4. Dr Willie Nduka	4. Walter Gawe
5. W. Chitongo	5. George Bodzo Nyandoro	5. Fibion Munyuki	5. Absolom Ndoro	5. Mrs Stella Musarira
6. D. Madamombe	6. Ben Kuda Taputsa Mutasa	6. Dominic Machaka	6. Benjamini Muvuti	6. Rogers Rutsito
7. K. Muswe	7. Enoch Dumbutshena*	7. Marshall Mukono	7. Mrs Evelyn Sithole	7. Kenneth Dhluni
8. L. Marufu	8. Dennis Nyamuswa	8. Patrick Zemura**	8. Mrs Siphikelelo Chizengeni	8. Samuel Goredema
9. J. Munda	9. Beatrice Manyara Mutasa	9. Mrs Sheila Tamuka	9. Kesiwe Malindi	9. Lewis Msengezi
10. P. Mavunga	10. Rev. Farai David Muzorewa	10. Nimrod Ndhlela	10. Davison Sambo	10. Canaan Gomwe
11. Mrs. H. Shereni	11. Essiah Zhuwarara*	11. M. Chingate	11. Tennyson Magura	11. Joseph Chipiro
12. Mrs L. Mzinyani	12. Lazarus Mtungwazi	12. Dexter Sibanda	12. Stephen Marara	12. Phillip Munzwa
13. Aaron Rusike	13. Raymond Chikarara Nyaude Madzima	13. Dickson Moyo	13. Douglas Mudzi	13. Sidney Musoni
14. Miss P. Matanda	14. Evelyn Joyce Shava*	14. Gilbert Moyo	14. Moses Zhanje	14. Stephen Gumbe
15. D. Chitunda	15. Avis Chikwana	15. Stephen Kazingizi**	15. Nassan Nengere	15. Samuel Mavani
MASHONALAND WEST PROVINCE
	1. Titus Garikayi Mukarati	1. S. Mazibananga	1. P. Mhlanga	1. G. Magaramombe
	2. Ronald Takawira Sadomba	2. T. Kasvinga	2. Mrs I. Chitate	2. S. Nyamweda
	3. Josiah Zinanga Mudzengi	3. D. Ngondo	3. N. Bangajena	3. B. Nyandoro
	4. Stanlake J. W. T. Samkange*	4. Patrick Tozivepi**	4. N. Mutandiwa	4. A. Mudenda
	5. Boniface Mhariwa Gumbo*	5. F. Musiwa	5. S. Mariga	5. S. Chirenda
	6. James Chikerema*	6. Charles Zviyambwa**	6. Mrs R. Mombeshore	6. S. Mangwiro
MATABELELAND NORTH PROVINCE
	1. Ernest Bulle	1. Lwazi Joel Mahlangu	1. Phineas Sithole	1. A. Mgutshini
	2. Walter Nqabeni Mthimkhulu	2. Peter Nkomo	2. Zachariah Tongai Chigumira	2. T. Madhana
	3. David Murambiwa Mutasa	3. M. Nyathi	3. R. Zemura	3. E. Chiwunye
	4. Morgan Kugaraunzwana Machiya	4. Brown Luza	4. J. Ngaliwe	4. R. Gunyela
	5. Gerald Mthimkhulu	5. Geshom Maplanka	5. J. Ndebele	5. T. Thebe
	6. Abel Chimombe	6. T. Ncube	6. Mrs H. Zwambila	6. W. Mapukanka
	7. M. Tshuma	7. Lot Enoch Dewa	7. E. Ncube	7. D. Mangena
	8. Mrs Gladys Tiriboyi	8. A. Mpofu	8. G. Ncube	8. A. Khumalo
	9. P. Zumbika	9. E. Mkandla	9. L. Dlodlo	9. L. Moyo
	10. A. Mutasa	10. A.M. Mpofu	10. S. Dube	10. S. Jubane
MATABELELAND SOUTH PROVINCE
	1. Joel Madewe Sigola	1. Zephania Bafana	1. Abraham Mazwi Khumalo	1. G. Dewa
	2. J. Tarugarira	2. Robert Siyoka	2. T. Mbuya	2. E. Maposa
	3. K. Nyabadzu	3. Timoth Ndlovu	3. P. Mpofu	3. H. Dube
	4. I. Ngulube	4. S. Noko	4. C. Malikongwa	4. J. Bango
	5. P. Maphosa	5. E. Velile	5. R. Simbi	5. G. Ncube
MIDLANDS PROVINCE
	1. Misheck Hove	1. Elijah Mukuchambano	1. James Dzvova	1. M. Malumisa
	2. Chris Mbanga	2. A. Gwemende	2. Edward Chitate	2. Philip Elijah Chigogo
	3. Joseph Jumo Bheka	3. J. Dondo	3. William Kambasha	3. P. Chirinda
	4. Lewis Bonda Gumbo	4. S. Shama	4. C. Mutambisi	4. J. Maziwisa
	5. John Kingston Nyahwata	5. G. Tshuma	5. J. Nyaguse	5. L. Nhamo
	6. Edmund Macheka	6. K. Dube	6. B. Magaisa	6. A. Tafirenyika
	7. John Karimanzira Kokera	7. F. Ngulube	7. U. Gokwe	7. S. Hove
	8. Abraham Chirwa	8. N. Dhlamini	8. V. Mashita	8. S. Sibanda
	9. F. Mutiti	9. N. Ndhlovu	9. Mrs O. Chidzongwa	9. Chingona
	10. W. Mugabiri	10. M. Moyo	10. J. Sithole	10. M. Chibvute
	11. S. Makura	11. S. Mbambo	11. L. Mambo	
VICTORIA PROVINCE
	1. Francis John Zindoga	1. Peter Munyaradzi Mandaza	1. Leonard Nyemba	1. E. Badza
	2. Smollie Poshi Mugudubi	2. J. Chikukwa	2. Edward Watungwa	2. D. Gurajena
	3. Christopher Donald Sakala	3. P. Makoni	3. Julius Chimedza	3. John Hungwe
	4. Herbert Zimuto	4. C. Marezva	4. S. Mangwengwe	4. B. Mazungunye
	5. David Munandi	5. G. Dziwa	5. V. Chikukutu	5. H. Makoni
	6. John Lewis Mashakada	6. E. Maphosa	6. J. Hlalsi	6. W. Mukaganwi
	7. J. Maswoswe	7. D. Mandishora	7. L. Shinya	7. J. Tagwireyi
	8. G. Sadomba	8. L. Sithole	8. A. Mashiri	8. T. Sithole
	9. J. Muchineripi	9. Mrs J. Sibanda	9. Mrs E. Masangu	9. R. Mhungu
	10. B. Basera	10. D. Makotere	10. C. Marozva	10. J. Masvinga

* – Subsequently, formed the Zimbabwe Democratic Party (see below)

** – These candidates had resigned from the United National Federal Party and joined the Zimbabwe United Peoples' Organisation after nominations had closed. It was ruled that their candidatures stood.

=== White roll ===
Polling day was 10 April 1979.

Constituency	Candidate	Party	Votes
AVONDALE	John Landau	RF	unopposed
BORROWDALE	Hilary Squires	RF	unopposed
BULAWAYO CENTRAL	Paddy Shields	RF	unopposed
BULAWAYO NORTH	Denis Walker	RF	unopposed
BULAWAYO SOUTH	Wally Stuttaford	RF	4,140
BULAWAYO SOUTH	Francis Robert Bertrand	Ind	500
BULAWAYO SOUTH	Jan (John) Francis Betch	Ind	57
CENTRAL	Rowan Cronjé	RF	unopposed
EASTERN	Desmond Butler	RF	2,538
EASTERN	John Constantinos Kircos	Ind	485
GATOOMA/HARTLEY	P. K. van der Byl	RF	unopposed
HATFIELD	Richard Cartwright	RF	2,672
HATFIELD	Charles James Britton	Ind	334
HATFIELD	Neville Ronald Arthur Skeates	Ind	314
HIGHLANDS	Mark Partridge	RF	unopposed
KOPJE	Dennis Divaris	RF	2,263
KOPJE	Mrs. Esther Rawson	Ind	834
KOPJE	Leslie Thomas Hayes	Ind	28
LUNDI	Theunis de Klerk	RF	unopposed
MAKONI	Jacobus Phillipus du Plessis	RF	unopposed
MARLBOROUGH	William Michie Irvine	RF	unopposed
MAZOE/MTOKO	Cecil Millar	RF	unopposed
MIDLANDS	Henry Swan Elsworth	RF	unopposed
MOUNT PLEASANT	Chris Andersen	RF	unopposed
NORTHERN	Esmond Micklem	RF	unopposed
SOUTHERN	Ian Smith	RF	unopposed
WESTERN	Alec Moseley	RF	unopposed

=== White non-constituency members ===
Polling day was 7 May 1979. Eight seats were up for election.

Rank	Party	Votes
1	Trevor Duncan Dollar	71
2	Derek Foxon Gawler	63
3	Wing-Commander Frederick Roy Simmonds	62
4	André Sothern Holland	60
5	Denys Sinclair Parkin	58
6	Bertram Ankers	53
7	Charles McKenzie Scott	52
8	Stanley Norman Eastwood	46
9=	Arthur Denis Crook	20
9=	Wing-Commander Robert Gaunt	20
11	Donald Galbraith Goddard	17
12	Reginald Reed Beaver	15
13	John Cornelius Gleig	12
14	Air Marshal Archibald Wilson	11
15	Jack Mussett	10
16	Albertus Herman du Toit	9

== Reactions ==
The United Nations Security Council passed several resolutions against the "illegal" election, including Resolution 445 and Resolution 448, both of which argued that the election was not representative of the Zimbabwean people and was designed to entrench white minority rule. In these resolutions, the UN declared the results of the election null and void.

== Aftermath ==
=== Changes during the Assembly ===
John Moses Chirimbani (UANC, Manicaland) was elected as the Speaker of the House of Assembly on 8 May 1979, and therefore an ex officio member. On 25 May, John Zwenhamo Ruredzo was appointed to replace him.

Robert Siyoka (UNFP, Matabeleland South) resigned, and was replaced by Sami Thomani Siyoka on 28 June 1979.

On 25 June 1979 James Chikerema led a group of eight elected UANC members in resigning from the party, and on 29 June seven of the eight formed the Zimbabwe Democratic Party. Actor Mupinyuri (UANC, Mashonaland Central) rejoined the UANC shortly after resigning from it. The seven who joined are denoted by asterisks in the lists above. A questionable wording in the electoral law led to the UANC taking legal action to disqualify the seven on the grounds that they had to keep their membership of the party to remain members of the Assembly, but Chikerema was successful in defending the right to break away.

Hilary Gwyn Squires resigned in June 1979, moving to South Africa to take up a legal career. David Colville Smith was returned unopposed as Rhodesian Front candidate for Borrowdale constituency on 24 July 1979.

Terrence Mashambanhaka (UANC, Mashonaland Central) was murdered on 16 September 1979 after being lured to an ambush at 'peace talks' with ZANLA forces. Abel Muringazuwa Madombwe was appointed to the Assembly to replace him on 27 November 1979.

Theunis de Klerk (RF, Lundi) was killed in a rocket attack on his home on 20 September 1979. Donald Galbraith Goddard was returned unopposed to follow him on 30 November 1979.

== Sources ==
- Rhodesia Government Gazette (candidates for White Roll constituencies; elected MPs)
- The Herald (common roll constituencies and election results)
