= Zimbabwe Rhodesia =

1979-1980 unrecognised state in Southern Africa

- 1979
- Flag (Sept–Dec 1979) Coat of arms
- Motto: Sit Nomine Digna (Latin) May she be worthy of the name
- Anthem: "Rise, O Voices of Rhodesia" (1979)
- Location of Zimbabwe Rhodesia (dark green)
- Status: Unrecognised state
- Capital: Salisbury
- Official languages: English
- Common languages: Shona; Sindebele
- Demonyms: Zimbabwe-Rhodesian; Rhodesian
- Government: Parliamentary republic
- President
  - 1979: Josiah Zion Gumede
- Prime Minister
  - 1979: Abel Muzorewa
- Historical era: Cold War
  - Internal Settlement: 3 March 1978
  - Government formed: 1 June 1979
  - British-supervised transition: 12 December 1979
  - Lancaster House Agreement: 21 December 1979

Population
  - Estimate: 6,656,000
- Currency: Rhodesian dollar
Preceded by	Succeeded by
Rhodesia	De facto: Southern Rhodesia (1979); De jure: Zimbabwe (1980)
- Today part of: Zimbabwe

Zimbabwe Rhodesia (/zɪmˈbɑːbweɪ roʊˈdiːʒə, zɪmˈbɑːbwi roʊˈdiːʒə/), alternatively known as Zimbabwe-Rhodesia, also informally known as Zimbabwe or Rhodesia, was a short-lived sovereign state that existed from 1 June 1979 to 18 April 1980, though it lacked international recognition. Zimbabwe Rhodesia was preceded by another state named the Republic of Rhodesia and was briefly under a British-supervised transitional government sometimes referred to as a reestablished Southern Rhodesia, which according to British constitutional theory had remained the lawful government in the area after Unilateral Declaration of Independence (UDI) in 1965. Following the 1980 Southern Rhodesian general election, the country was granted internationally-recognised independence within the Commonwealth as the Republic of Zimbabwe.

== Background ==
Under pressure from the international community, an "Internal Settlement" was drawn up between the Smith administration of Rhodesia and moderate African nationalist parties. Meanwhile, the government continued to battle armed resistance from the Patriotic Front, a coalition of two African Leadership parties: the Zimbabwe African Peoples Union (ZAPU) and the Zimbabwe African National Union (ZANU).

The "Internal Settlement", signed in March 1978, led to the creation of an interim government in which Africans were included in leading positions for the first time, while creating an independent civil service, judiciary, police force, and army. The settlement also created an executive council composed of Ian Smith and three black individuals (Muzorewa, Sithole, and Chirau), and a ministerial council, while Smith retained his title as prime minister. It was also stated that the primary job of this new government was to draw up a constitution for the country, hold elections in April 1979, and arrange a ceasefire with the Patriotic Front. A further goal of the agreement was said to be the hope of ending the country's civil war. Following the election, Muzorewa remarked that he didn't want the country to be "a sham, a fraud, a hollow shell with the mere trappings of independence" or the country to "ever to become another banana republic."

Furthermore, a goal of the settlement was for Rhodesia to receive international recognition and have the sanctions imposed on the country due to Unilateral Declaration of Independence in 1965 to be removed. Following the settlement, Muzorewa attempted to convince the British government to recognise the transitional government, but they did not do so. In the same vein, some believed that the settlement was "sufficient" grounds for recognition of Rhodesia and lifting sanctions. Later in 1978, the removal of sanctions was agreed to by the U.S. House of Representatives and U.S. Senate, with the caveat that they could only be lifted "once elections were held". The settlement also reportedly resulted in the release of political prisoners. However, the country's civil service, judiciary, police and armed forces continued to be administered by the same officials as before, of whom most were White Zimbabweans, due to the composition of the upper-middle class of the period.

The new state did not gain international recognition. The Commonwealth Secretariat claimed that the "so-called 'Constitution of Zimbabwe Rhodesia'" would be "no more legal and valid" than the UDI constitution it replaced. The U.N. Security Council, in Resolution 448 condemned the general election in April 1979 as "null and void" and described the country as an "illegal racist regime" which was attempting to retain and extend "racist minority rule and...preventing the accession of Zimbabwe to independence and genuine majority rule." It also called on all states to not recognise the government and to strictly follow mandatory sanctions against the country. As noted by Time in June 1979, United States President Jimmy Carter believed that the elections which installed the government in were neither "fair or free," because they were held under a constitution that reserved "a disproportionate share of power for the white minority." He later, in November 1979, continued sanctions until the negotiations conducted by the United Kingdom to end the "peaceful resolution" of the conflict in Rhodesia had come to a close.

== Nomenclature ==
As early as 1960, African nationalist political organisations in Rhodesia agreed that the country should use the name "Zimbabwe"; they used that name as part of the titles of their organisations. The name "Zimbabwe", broken down to Dzimba dzamabwe in Shona (one of the two major languages in the country), means "houses of stone". Meanwhile, the white Rhodesian community was reluctant to drop the name "Rhodesia", hence a compromise was met.

The constitution named the new state as "Zimbabwe Rhodesia", with no reference to its status as a republic in its name. Although the official name contained no hyphen, the country's name was hyphenated in some foreign publications as "Zimbabwe-Rhodesia". The country was also nicknamed "Rhobabwe", a blend of "Rhodesia" and "Zimbabwe". It had first been used in the late 1960s.

After taking office as prime minister, Abel Muzorewa sought to drop "Rhodesia" from the country's name. The name "Zimbabwe Rhodesia" had been criticised by some black politicians like Senator Chief Zephaniah Charumbira, who said it implied that Zimbabwe was "the son of Rhodesia". ZANU, led by Robert Mugabe in exile, denounced what it described as "the derogatory name of 'Zimbabwe Rhodesia'". The proposed changes to the name were not implemented.

The government also adopted a new national flag, featuring the same Zimbabwe soapstone bird, on 2 September of that year. In addition, it announced changes to public holidays, with Rhodes Day and Founders Day being replaced by two new holidays, both of which were known as Ancestors Day, while Republic Day and Independence Day were to be replaced by President's Day and Unity Day, celebrated on 25 and 26 October of that year.

In response, the Voice of Zimbabwe radio service operated by ZANU from Maputo in Mozambique, carried a commentary entitled "The proof of independence is not flags or names", dismissing the changes as aimed at "strengthening the racist puppet alliance's position at the Zimbabwe conference in London".

The national airline, Air Rhodesia, was also renamed Air Zimbabwe. However, no postage stamps were issued; issues of 1978 still used "Rhodesia", and the next stamp issues were in 1980, after the change to just "Zimbabwe," and were inscribed accordingly.

== Government of Zimbabwe Rhodesia ==
Zimbabwe Rhodesia's short-lived government was elected prior to the creation of the state, with the 1979 Rhodesian general election, the first in which a majority of elected representatives were black. Adapting the constitution of the Unilateral Declaration of Independence (UDI), Zimbabwe Rhodesia was governed by a prime minister and Cabinet chosen from the majority party in a 100-member House of Assembly. A 40-member Senate acted as the upper House, and both together chose a figurehead President in whose name the government was conducted.

=== Legislative Branch ===
Of the 100 members of the House of Assembly, 72 were "common roll" members for whom the electorate was every adult citizen. All of these members were black Africans. Those on the previous electoral roll of Rhodesia (due to education, property and income qualifications for voter rolls) elected 20 members; although this did not in theory exclude non-whites, very few black Africans met the qualification requirements. A delimitation commission sat in 1978 to determine how to reduce the previous 50 constituencies to 20. The remaining eight seats for old voter role non-constituency members were filled by members chosen by the other 92 members of the House of Assembly once their election was complete. In the only election held by Zimbabwe Rhodesia, Bishop Abel Muzorewa's United African National Council (UANC) won a majority in the common-roll seats, while Ian Smith's Rhodesian Front (RF) won all of the old voter roll seats. Ndabaningi Sithole's Zimbabwe African National Union (ZANU) won 12 seats.

The Senate of Zimbabwe Rhodesia had 40 members. Ten members each were returned by the old voter roll members of the House of Assembly and the common roll members, and five members each by the Council of Chiefs of Mashonaland and Matabeleland. The remaining members were directly appointed by the President under the advice of the Prime Minister.

=== Executive Branch ===
The President of Zimbabwe Rhodesia was elected by the members of the Parliament, sitting together. At the election on 28 May 1979, Josiah Zion Gumede of the United African National Council (UANC) and Timothy Ndhlovu of the United National Federal Party (UNFP) were nominated. Gumede won by 80 votes to Ndhlovu's 33.

Starting with 51 seats out of 100, Abel Muzorewa of the UANC was appointed as Prime Minister, and also appointed Minister of Combined Operations and Defence. He formed a joint government with Ian Smith, the former Prime Minister of Rhodesia, who was a Minister without Portfolio. Muzorewa also attempted to include the other African parties who had lost the election. Rhodesian Front members served as Muzorewa's ministers of justice, agriculture, and finance, with David Smith continuing in the role of Minister of Finance, while P. K. van der Byl, the former Minister of Defence, serving as both Minister of Transport and Minister of Power and Posts.

== End of Zimbabwe Rhodesia ==
The Lancaster House Agreement, signed on 21 December 1979, stipulated that control over the country be returned to the United Kingdom in preparation for elections to be held in the spring of 1980. Before the negotiations had ended, on 11 December 1979, the law was passed which declared that "Zimbabwe Rhodesia shall cease to be an independent State and become part of Her Majesty's dominions". In response, the Parliament of the United Kingdom passed Order 1979, on 14 December, establishing the offices of Governor and Deputy Governor of Southern Rhodesia, filled by Lord Soames and Sir Antony Duff respectively, creating a "permanent government" for the country.

Although the name of the country formally reverted to Southern Rhodesia at this time, the name "Zimbabwe Rhodesia" remained in many of the country's institutions, such as the Zimbabwe Rhodesia Broadcasting Corporation. On 18 April 1980, Zimbabwe Rhodesia became the independent Republic of Zimbabwe within the Commonwealth of Nations (however it was suspended in 2002 and withdrew in 2003).

== See also ==
- Colonial history of Southern Rhodesia
- Education in Zimbabwe
- Federation of Rhodesia and Nyasaland
- History of Zimbabwe
- Rhodesia
- Rhodesian Bush War
- Southern Rhodesia
- Zimbabwe
