= United Nations Security Council Resolution 463 =

UN Security Council Resolution 463
- Southern Rhodesia (now Zimbabwe)
- Date: 2 February 1980
- Meeting no.: 2,196
- Code: S/RES/463 (Document)
- Subject: Southern Rhodesia
- Voting summary: 14 voted for; None voted against; None abstained
- Result: Adopted

Security Council composition
- Permanent members: China; France; Soviet Union; United Kingdom; United States
- Non-permanent members: Bangladesh; East Germany; Jamaica; Mexico; Niger; Norway; Philippines; Portugal; Tunisia; Zambia

United Nations Security Council resolution 463, adopted on 2 February 1980, after considering the latest developments in Southern Rhodesia and Resolution 460 (1979) in which it was noted that an agreement had produced a Constitution for a free and independent Zimbabwe and majority rule, the Council called on all parties to comply with the Lancaster House Agreement and the administering power, the United Kingdom, to fully implement the agreement.

Resolution 463 called upon the Government of the United Kingdom to ensure that South African forces would be withdrawn, regular or mercenary, out of the country. It also requested that United Kingdom implement steps including:

(a) the speedy return of Zimbabwean exiles and refugees in accordance with the agreement;
(b) the release of political prisoners;
(c) the confinement of the Rhodesian and auxiliary forces to their bases;
(d) the according of equal treatment of all parties;
(e) the rescindment of all emergency measures and laws inconsistent with the conduct of free and fair elections.

The resolution also went on to call for the release of South African political prisoners, including "freedom fighters" – presumably Umkhonto we Sizwe members detained by the Rhodesian Security Forces – and to ensure safe passage to a country of their choice. It also condemned South Africa for its interference in Southern Rhodesia.

While noting that it would keep the situation under review until the full independence of Zimbabwe, the Council adopted the resolution by 14 votes to none, while the United Kingdom did not participate in the vote.

== See also ==
- History of Zimbabwe
- Lancaster House Agreement
- List of United Nations Security Council Resolutions 401 to 500 (1976–1982)
