= Chris Mbanga =

Chris Mbanga is the National Secretary of the St. John Association in Zimbabwe and the Chairman of the Southern zone of the Africa Scout Region.

He was a member of the UANC, elected to parliament in the Zimbabwe Rhodesia general election, 1979. He is a member of the MDC-T party and served as Morgan Tsvangirai's electoral agent in the Zimbabwean presidential election, 2008.
