= Internal Settlement =

1978 agreement in Rhodesia

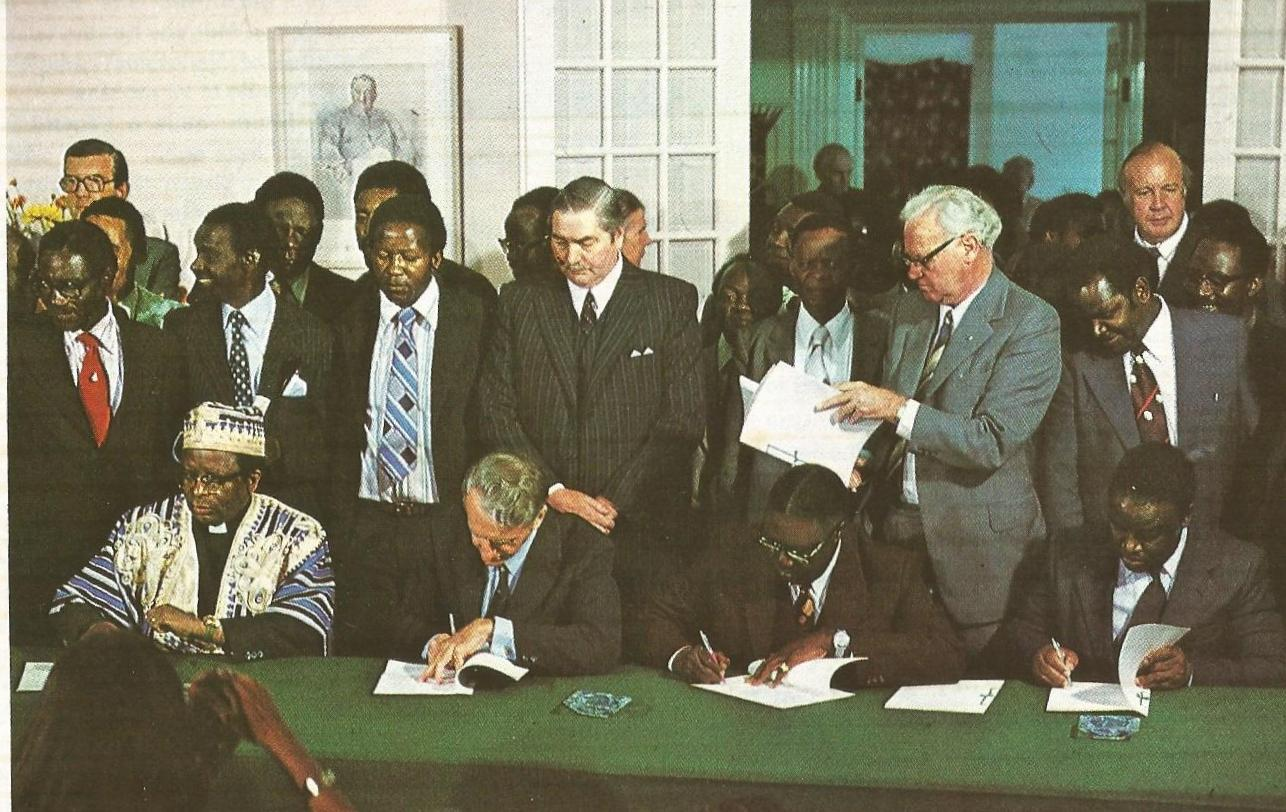
Signing the Rhodesian Internal Settlement (from left: Bishop Abel Muzorewa, Ian Smith, Jeremiah Chirau and Ndabaningi Sithole)

The Internal Settlement (also called the Salisbury Agreement) was an agreement which was signed on 3 March 1978 between Prime Minister of Rhodesia Ian Smith and the moderate African nationalist leaders comprising Bishop Abel Muzorewa, Ndabaningi Sithole and Senator Chief Jeremiah Chirau. After almost 15 years of the Rhodesian Bush War, and under pressure from the sanctions placed on Rhodesia by the international community, and political pressure from South Africa, the United Kingdom, and the United States, the Rhodesian government met with some of the internally based moderate African nationalist leaders in order to reach an agreement on the political future for the country.

== Background ==
By 1975–1976, it was clear that an indefinite postponement of majority rule, which had been the cornerstone of the Smith Government's strategy since Unilateral Declaration of Independence, was no longer viable. The country was under commercial and financial sanctions pursued by the British and guerrilla action was being launched against Rhodesia by the Zimbabwe African People's Union (ZAPU) and the Zimbabwe African National Union (ZANU). With the Carnation Revolution ending Portuguese rule in Mozambique the situation of the Rhodesian government was deteriorating. Overt South African support for Rhodesia was waning, due to growing sentiment in Pretoria that white rule in such an overwhelmingly black country (blacks outnumbered whites by 22-to-1) could not be maintained forever. South Africa began scaling back economic assistance to Rhodesia, placed limits on the amount of fuel and munitions being supplied to the Rhodesian Security Forces, and withdrew the personnel and equipment they had previously provided to aid the war effort, including a border police unit that had been helping guard the Rhodesia-Zambia border. Furthermore, South Africa became concerned about the conflict's scale, and pursued a policy of supporting a "friendly" Black government in Zimbabwe. This was followed by South African attempts to negotiate with nationalist leaders and pressure the Rhodesians into this objective with the help of Zambian president Kenneth Kaunda.

Late in 1976, Ian Smith, after his attempted internal settlement with Joshua Nkomo of the ZAPU failed, accepted the basic elements of the compromise proposals made by US Secretary of State Henry Kissinger to introduce majority rule within two years. The Smith Government then sought to negotiate an acceptable settlement with moderate black leaders, while retaining strong white influence in key areas. The Rhodesian military, in turn, aimed to erode the rising military strength of the ZANLA and ZIPRA to the greatest extent possible in order to "buy time" for an acceptable political settlement to be reached. The response from Nkomo's ZAPU and Robert Mugabe's ZANU was to form the Patriotic Front, uniting ZAPU and ZANU efforts, and escalate the fighting in the conflict.

By 1977, the war had spread throughout Rhodesia. ZANLA continued to operate from Mozambique and remained dominant among the Mashona peoples in eastern and central Rhodesia. Meanwhile, ZIPRA remained active in the north and west, using bases in Zambia and Botswana, and were mainly supported by the Ndebele tribes. With this escalation came sophistication, organisation and modern weapons for the guerrillas, and although many were still untrained, an increasing number were trained in Communist bloc and other sympathetic countries. The United Nations Security Council denounced the incursion of the "illegal racist minority regime in Southern Rhodesia" in Resolution 411, on June 30, 1977.

== Settlement terms and goals ==
The agreement led to the creation of an interim government in which Africans were included in leading positions for the first time, while creating an independent civil service, judiciary, police force, and army. The settlement also created an executive council composed of Ian Smith and three black individuals (Muzorewa, Sithole, and Chirau), and a ministerial council, while Smith retained his title as prime minister. It was also stated that the primary job of this new government was to draw up a constitution for the country, hold elections in April 1979, and arrange a ceasefire with the Patriotic Front. A further goal of the agreement was said to be the hope of ending the country's civil war.

Two further goals of the settlement were international recognition and the removal of sanctions imposed after Rhodesia's Unilateral Declaration of Independence in 1965. Following the settlement, Muzorewa attempted to convince the British government to recognize the transitional government, but they did not do so. In the same vein, some believed that the settlement was "sufficient" grounds for recognition of Rhodesia and lifting sanctions. Later in 1978, the removal of sanctions was agreed to by the U.S. House of Representatives and U.S. Senate, with the caveat that they could only be lifted "once elections were held". The settlement also reportedly resulted in the release of political prisoners.

== Impact ==
Following the agreement, Muzorewa and his UANC party were elected during the general election of March 1979, which had an electorate qualified by educational standard and/or income and/or worth of property owned, not by race. However, ZAPU and ZANU refused to participate in the elections. The United Nations Security Council passed several resolutions against the "illegal" election, including Resolution 445 and Resolution 448, both of which argued that the election was not representative of the Zimbabwean people and was designed to entrench white minority rule. In these resolutions, the UN declared the results of the election null and void.

A new government of national unity with Bishop Abel Muzorewa as Prime Minister took office on June 1, 1979. The country was renamed Zimbabwe Rhodesia, and a new national flag was later adopted signifying the transition. It was expected that all sanctions would be lifted now that the country was under democratically elected black majority rule. However, the lifting of sanctions did not occur mainly because the Patriotic Front, composed of the externally based African nationalist parties of ZAPU and ZANU under the respective leadership of Joshua Nkomo and Robert Mugabe, had not been involved in the political process and had not participated in the general election. Under mounting international pressure, particularly from Jimmy Carter, Andrew Young and the British Government, Muzorewa was persuaded to take part in negotiations at Lancaster House late 1979.

The agreement at the Lancaster House Conference between the Zimbabwe Rhodesia and British Governments, ZAPU and ZANU in December 1979 resulted in a ceasefire and the end of the Rhodesian Bush War. The country returned to legality under direct British rule with Lord Soames as governor, thereby ending the rebellion against the British Crown caused by the signing of Rhodesia's Unilateral Declaration of Independence in November 1965. Under the terms of the Lancaster House Agreement, a fresh general election was held in February 1980. Following this, the country attained its independence as the Republic of Zimbabwe on April 18, 1980. Robert Mugabe was elected as the country's first prime minister.

== Reaction ==
=== Before settlement ===
On February 17, 1978, before the agreement was concluded, Nkomo warned that the settlement would lead to increased fighting. On February 28, British foreign secretary David Owen would tell Kingman Brewster Jr., the U.S. Ambassador to the United Kingdom, that he did not believe the settlement was "viable". Seven days earlier, U.S. Deputy National Security Advisor David L. Aaron warned, in a meeting of the National Security Council Special Coordination Committee, that the Soviet Union would enter southern Africa "as a result of the internal settlement in Rhodesia".

=== After settlement ===
After the internal settlement was announced, the United Kingdom and the United States – in separate statements – said that they viewed the settlement as a step in the right direction, but nevertheless inadequate because ZANU and ZAPU were not included. Each of the Frontline States – Angola, Botswana, Mozambique, Tanzania, and Zambia – condemned the settlement as a "sell-out" and accused Muzorewa, Sithole, and Chirau of being complicit with the Rhodesian government, which they saw as illegal. The Patriotic Front, composed of ZANU and ZAPU, also condemned the settlement and similarly accused the three black signatories of being Rhodesian puppets. It vowed to continue fighting until attaining a military victory in the war. The Council of Ministers of the Organisation of African Unity had several days earlier – at its thirtieth ordinary session in Tripoli, Libya, from 20 to 28 February 1978 – foreseen the prospect of a settlement, and issued a statement condemning any agreement that did not include the Patriotic Front.

At the meeting of the European Council from April 7–8, 1978, they concluded that the settlement was "inadequate" and endorsed the Anglo-American Initiative on Rhodesia as the "best basis" of an acceptable settlement, and stated that all sides involved need to be brought together in order to avoid "a dangerous escalation of the conflict. It was also reported by the Central Intelligence Agency's National Foreign Assessment Center that television in Havana, Cuba was critical of the settlement, while Nkomo and Mugabe visited Cuba later in the year. In addition, Max T. Chigwida of the South African Institute of International Affairs stated that the agreement's terms had been subjected to a "lot of criticisms and propaganda based on...motives by all sorts of critics" while scholar Tendai Mutunhu said the settlement created a "puppet black regime", prevented a socialist government in Zimbabwe, said the "masses" in the country opposed it, and claimed that the settlement was being supported by huge transnational corporations and foreign investors.

Prompted by the request of the African Group within the United Nations, the UN Security Council of discussed the issue of Rhodesia's internal settlement at its 2061st to 2067th meetings from 6–14 March 1978. Robert Mugabe and Joshuo Nkomo spoke before the council and condemned the settlement. On March 14, 1978, the Security Council adopted Resolution 423, which condemned the internal settlement as "illegal and unacceptable". Canada, France, the US, the UK, and West Germany abstained from the vote. The same day, the U.N. Security Council passed Resolution 424 calling for the end of the "illegal racist minority régime" in Rhodesia. At the World Conference against Racism, organized by UNESCO, in August 1978, participants condemned the settlement as a "blatant attempt to split the national liberation movement" in an attempt to cause civil war and perpetuate "racist minority rule" in the country, stated it cannot be an "acceptable solution" to ensure majority rule in the country.

== Legacy ==
Scholars Roland Oliver and Anthony Atmore noted that although Rhodesia had taken a "momentous step" toward a primarily Black government, the country would not have "lasting peace" and international recognition until exiled nationalists were accommodated. In an obituary for Muzorewa, in The Guardian, in 2010, Cameron Duodu wrote that the settlement did not "stop the guerrilla warfare" nor was it recognized by the United Nations, with sanctions on Rhodesia continuing, while Muzorewa became "tainted as an opportunist and a sell-out". Zimbabwean scholar Richard S. Maposa stated, in 2013, that although there was "no international recognition" for the settlement, which he described as a "painful interlude", it still facilitated the "transitional process" of the country toward Black majority rule.
