= Patriotic Front (Zimbabwe) =

Former political coalition in Zimbabwe

The Patriotic Front in Zimbabwe was a coalition of two African Leadership parties: the Zimbabwe African Peoples Union (ZAPU) and the Zimbabwe African National Union (ZANU) which had worked together to fight against white minority rule in Rhodesia.

In the 1980 elections, ZAPU contested as the Patriotic Front, whereas ZANU contested as the ZANU-Patriotic Front.

In 1988 the ruling ZANU absorbed ZAPU to become Zimbabwe African National Union – Patriotic Front (ZANU-PF).

== See also ==
- List of political parties in Zimbabwe
