= Lancaster House Agreement =

1979 ceasefire agreement ending the Rhodesian Bush War

Southern Rhodesia Constitutional Conference
- Bishop Abel Muzorewa signs the Lancaster House Agreement seated next to British Foreign Secretary Lord Carrington.
- Signed: 21 December 1979
- Location: Lancaster House in London
- Signatories: Peter Carrington, 6th Baron Carrington, Sir Ian Gilmour, Bishop Abel Muzorewa, Silas Mundawarara, Joshua Nkomo and Robert Mugabe
- Parties: United Kingdom Zimbabwe Rhodesia ZANU–PF
- Language: English

The Lancaster House Agreement is an agreement signed on 21 December 1979 in Lancaster House, following the conclusion of a constitutional conference where different parties discussed the future of Zimbabwe Rhodesia, formerly known as Rhodesia. The agreement effectively concluded the Rhodesian Bush War. It also marked the nullification of Rhodesia's Unilateral Declaration of Independence, as British colonial authority was to be restored for a transitional period to internationally recognised independence, during which free elections under supervision by the British government would take place. Crucially, ZANU and ZAPU, the political wings of ZANLA and ZIPRA (who had been waging an escalating insurgency since 1964), would be permitted to stand candidates in the forthcoming elections. This was however conditional to compliance with the ceasefire and the verified absence of voter intimidation.

== Negotiations ==
Following the meeting of Commonwealth heads of government held in Lusaka from 1–7 August 1979, the British government invited Bishop Abel Muzorewa, the recently installed prime minister of the (unrecognized) Zimbabwe Rhodesia government, along with the leaders of the Patriotic Front (the name of the ZANU-ZAPU coalition), to participate in a constitutional conference at Lancaster House. The purpose of the conference was to discuss and reach agreement on the terms of a post-independence constitution, to agree on the holding of elections under British authority, and to enable Zimbabwe Rhodesia to proceed to lawful and internationally recognised independence, with the parties settling their differences by political means. The conference formally began on 10 September 1979.

Peter Carington, 6th Baron Carrington, foreign and Commonwealth secretary of the United Kingdom, chaired the conference. The conference took place from 10 September to 15 December 1979 with 47 plenary sessions. In late September 1979, president Jimmy Carter, in a letter to Senator John Stennis, praised the conference for making "some important first steps," but argued that "many difficult negotiations lie ahead."

During the negotiations, the British delegation was headed by Antony Duff. It included over 20 other members, such as Lord Carrington, Ian Gilmour, Michael Havers, David Ormsby-Gore, Richard Luce, Michael Palliser, Derek Day. Other delegates included Robin Renwick, Nicholas Fenn of the Foreign Office, George Walden, and Charles Powell. Andrew Novak wrote that Shridath Ramphal, the head of the Commonwealth of Nations, acted as a "shadow mediator" for the conference, restraining Carrington from hard-line positions, and ensuring Carrington and the Patriotic Front received "private concessions" during the negotiations.

The Patriotic Front delegation was led by Robert Mugabe and Joshua Nkomo. ZAPU leaders Josiah Mushore Chinamano and Joseph Msika, ZANLA general Josiah Tongogara, and ZAPU members Ernest R 6Kadungure and T George Silundika were also delegates. Additional delegates included Edgar Tekere, Dzingai Mutumbuka, Josiah Tungamirai, Edson Zvobgo, Simbi Mubako, Walter Kamba, and John Nkomo.

The delegation which represented Zimbabwe Rhodesia was led by Bishop Abel Muzorewa. This delegation also included Ian Smith (minister without portfolio), Ndabaningi Sithole, Kayisa Ndiweni, Rowan Cronjé, Harold Hawkins, Kayisa Ndiweni, Simpson Mutambanengwe, and Gordon Chavunduka

In the course of its proceedings the conference reached agreement on a post-independence constitution, arrangements for the post-independence period, and a ceasefire agreement signed by all the parties. In concluding this agreement and signing its report, the parties agreed to accept the authority of the governor, abide by the independence constitution (later called the "Lancaster Constitution") and ceasefire agreement, comply with the pre-independence arrangements, campaign peacefully and without intimidation, renounce the use of force for political ends, and accept the outcome of the elections and to instruct any forces under their authority to do the same. Under the constitution, 20 per cent of the seats in the country's parliament were to be reserved for whites. This provision was set for seven years, remaining in the constitution until 1987.

In November 1979, U.S. secretary of state Cyrus Vance recommended that President Jimmy Carter not lift sanctions on Rhodesia, arguing that doing so would "jeopardize the negotiations" and undermine U.S. ability to urge "flexibility on...external parties and...Front Line states." The next month, Stephen Solarz argued that lifting sanctions before the end of the conference could be "cited as a reason for its collapse".

The Lancaster House Agreement was signed on 21 December 1979. Lord Carrington and Sir Ian Gilmour signed the agreement on behalf of the United Kingdom, Abel Muzorewa and Silas Mundawarara signed for the government of Zimbabwe Rhodesia, and Robert Mugabe and Joshua Nkomo for the Patriotic Front. According to Robert Matthews, the success of the Lancaster House negotiations can be explained by a "balance of forces on the battlefield that clearly favoured the nationalists" the impact of international sanctions on the Rhodesian economy, "a particular pattern of third party interests" and the resource and skills that Lord Carrington brought to the table as a mediator. The agreement was also described as a "constitutional compromise".

== Outcome ==
The agreement would lead to the dissolution of the unrecognised state of Zimbabwe Rhodesia, created months earlier by the Internal Settlement. Under the terms of the agreement, Zimbabwe Rhodesia temporarily reverted to its former status as the colony of Southern Rhodesia, thereby ending the rebellion caused by Rhodesia's Unilateral Declaration of Independence. Lord Soames was appointed governor, with full executive and legislative powers.

In terms of the ceasefire, ZAPU and ZANU guerrillas were to gather at designated assembly points under British supervision, following which elections were to be held to elect a new government. These elections were held in February 1980, and resulted in ZANU led by Robert Mugabe winning a majority of seats. On 18 April 1980, according to the terms of the constitution, agreed-upon during the Lancaster House negotiations, Southern Rhodesia became independent as Zimbabwe, with Robert Mugabe as the first prime minister. Mugabe's victory reportedly spelled "disaster" for South Africa's plan to establish a "neutral constellation of friendly, client states."

The content of Lancaster House Agreement covered the new constitution, pre-independence arrangements, and the terms of ceasefire. The agreement is named after Lancaster House in London, where the conference on independence from 10 September to 15 December 1979 was held. The agreement was not, however, signed until 21 December.

== Later developments ==
In February 1980, the U.N. Security Council passed Resolution 463 which called on all parties to comply with the agreement, and the UK to fully implement the agreement, encouraging the UK government to ensure that South African forces would be withdrawn, regular or mercenary, out of the country. It also requested that the UK allow the speedy return of Zimbabwean exiles and refugees, release of political prisoners, confinement of the Rhodesian and auxiliary forces to their bases, and rescindment of all emergency measures and laws inconsistent with the conduct of free and fair elections. The resolution also condemned South Africa for its interference in Southern Rhodesia and reaffirmed the "unalienable right" of the Zimbabwean people to self-determination. The council adopted the resolution by 14 votes to none, while the United Kingdom did not participate in the vote.

It was said that the "crucial land question" was excluded from the conference's deliberations, with the "key financial backing for land restitution" promised by the Carter Administration, but it actually delayed land reform by ten years. The agreement specified that the new government could buy land owned by white settlers, but only from "willing sellers" with compensation, and without formal stipulations for Britain to "fund land programmes". It was also said that the British were protective of "white farming interests" in Zimbabwe.

In 1997, ZANLA and ZIPRA war veterans began receiving individual personal payments of ZW$50,000 each for their service in the Rhodesian Bush War. Former civil servants of the Rhodesian Government and Rhodesian military personnel received pensions until 2003; social welfare minister Nicholas Goche said in 2014 that the government could no longer afford to make the payments.

In 1998, Robert Mugabe announced that the forced acquisition of land under section 8 would proceed. Within 24 hours, the Zimbabwean dollar had devalued more than 50%. In 2000 and 2001, the U.S. and British governments, and the European Union, would condemn the new land reform program, although African organizations also criticised the international community for their role in the situation, and Britain's abrogation of their promises made at the time of Zimbabwean independence from colonial rule.

== See also ==
- Land reform in Zimbabwe

== Sources ==
- Brailsford, Jack (2016). British government policy and diplomacy in Southern Rhodesia, 1979-1980 (PDF) (Masters). University of York. Archived from the original (PDF) on 5 August 2023.
- Novak, Andrew (2009). "Face-Saving Maneuvers and Strong Third-Party Mediation: The Lancaster House Conference on Zimbabwe-Rhodesia". International Negotiation. 14: 149–174. doi:10.1163/157180609X406553. ALT URL
- Onslow, Sue; van Wy, Anna-Mart, eds. (2013). Southern Africa in the Cold War, Post-1974 (PDF). Washington, D.C.: Wilson Center. ISBN 978-1-938027-06-2.
