= List of presidential palaces =

List of official presidential residences worldwide

This is a list of presidential palaces, containing buildings that serve as official residences, primary workplaces, or ceremonial seats of presidents of sovereign nations.

== List ==
=== Africa ===
UN member states
| Country | Building | Notes | Image |
|---|---|---|---|
| Algeria | El Mouradia, Algiers | | |
| Angola | Presidential Palace, Luanda | | |
| Benin | Palais de la Marina, Cotonou | | |
| Botswana | State House, Gaborone | | |
| Cape Verde | Palácio Presidencial, Praia | | |
| Cameroon | The Unity Palace, Yaoundé | | |
| Chad | Pink Palace, N'Djamena | | |
| Republic of the Congo | Palais du Peuple, Brazzaville | | |
| Democratic Republic of the Congo | Palais de la Nation, Kinshasa | | |
| Djibouti | Presidential Palace, Djibouti City | | |
| Egypt | Abdeen Palace, Cairo | | |
| Egypt | Heliopolis Palace, Cairo | | |
| Egypt | Koubbeh Palace, Cairo | | |
| Egypt | Montaza Palace, Alexandria | | |
| Egypt | Ras el-Tin Palace, Alexandria | | |
| Equatorial Guinea | Malabo Government Building, Malabo | | |
| Eritrea | Asmara President's Office, Asmara | | |
| Ethiopia | National Palace, Addis Ababa | | |
| Gabon | Presidential Palace, Libreville | | |
| The Gambia | State House of the Gambia, Banjul | | |
| Ghana | Jubilee House, Accra | | |
| Guinea | Presidential Palace, Conakry | | |
| Guinea-Bissau | Presidential Palace, Bissau | | |
| Ivory Coast | Presidential Palace, Abidjan | | |
| Ivory Coast | Presidential Palace, Yamoussoukro | | |
| Kenya | State House, Nairobi | | |
| Liberia | Executive Mansion, Monrovia | | |
| Madagascar | Iavoloha Palace, Antananarivo | | |
| Madagascar | Ambohitsorohitra Palace, Antananarivo | Ceremonial residence | |
| Malawi | Kamuzu Palace, Lilongwe | | |
| Mali | Presidential Palace, Bamako | | |
| Mauritania | Presidential Palace, Nouakchott | | |
| Mauritius | State House, Reduit | | |
| Mozambique | Palácio da Ponta Vermelha, Maputo | | |
| Namibia | State House of Namibia, Windhoek | | |
| Niger | Presidential Palace, Niamey | | |
| Nigeria | Nigerian Presidential Complex, Abuja | | |
| Rwanda | Urugwiro, Kigali | | |
| São Tomé and Príncipe | Presidential Palace, São Tomé | | |
| Senegal | Presidential Palace, Dakar | | |
| Seychelles | State House, Victoria | | |
| Sierra Leone | State House, Freetown | | |
| Somalia | Villa Somalia, Mogadishu | | |
| Somaliland | Somaliland Presidential Palace, Hargeisa | | |
| South Africa | Mahlamba Ndlopfu, Pretoria | | |
| South Africa | King's House, Durban | | |
| South Africa | Genadendal Residence, Cape Town | | |
| South Sudan | Presidential Palace, Juba | | |
| Sudan | Presidential Palace, Khartoum | | |
| Tanzania | Ikulu, Dar es Salaam | | |
| Togo | Palace of the Governors, Lomé | | |
| Tunisia | Carthage Palace, Tunis | | |
| Uganda | State House, Kampala | | |
| Uganda | State House, Entebbe | | |
| Zambia | State House, Lusaka | | |
| Zimbabwe | State House, Harare, State House, Bulawayo | Current residence | |
| Zimbabwe | Zimbabwe House, Harare | Current residence | |
| Zimbabwe | Blue Roof, Harare | Former residence | |

=== Americas ===
| Country | Building | Notes | Image |
|---|---|---|---|
| Argentina | Casa Rosada, Buenos Aires | Government office | |
| Argentina | Quinta de Olivos, Buenos Aires Province | Official residence | |
| Barbados | State House, Bridgetown | Official residence | |
| Bolivia | Casa Grande del Pueblo, La Paz | | |
| Brazil | Palácio da Alvorada, Brasília | Official residence | |
| Brazil | Palácio do Planalto, Brasília | Official workplace | |
| Chile | La Moneda Palace, Santiago | Official office | |
| Chile | Palacio Presidencial de Cerro Castillo, Viña del Mar | Summer residence | |
| Colombia | Casa de Nariño, Bogotá | Official residence | |
| Costa Rica | Casa Presidencial, San José | | |
| Cuba | Presidential Palace, Havana | Has been a museum since 1959 | |
| Cuba | Palacio de la Revolucion, Havana | Headquarters of the Communist Party of Cuba and residence of the First Secretary of the Communist Party of Cuba since 1965 | |
| Dominica | Government House, Roseau | | |
| Dominican Republic | National Palace, Santo Domingo | | |
| Ecuador | Carondelet Palace, Quito | | |
| El Salvador | Casa Presidencial, San Salvador | | |
| Guatemala | National Palace, Guatemala City | | |
| Guyana | State House, Georgetown | | |
| Haiti | National Palace, Port-au-Prince | | |
| Honduras | Presidential Palace, Tegucigalpa | | |
| Mexico | National Palace, Mexico City | Official residence | |
| Nicaragua | Presidential Palace, Managua | | |
| Nicaragua | House of Peoples, Managua | | |
| Panama | Palacio de las Garzas, Panama City | | |
| Paraguay | Palacio de los López, Asunción | | |
| Peru | Government Palace, Lima | | |
| Suriname | Gouvernementsgebouw, Paramaribo | | |
| Trinidad and Tobago | President's House, Port of Spain | | |
| United States | White House, Washington, D.C. | Official residence | |
| Uruguay | Executive Tower, Montevideo | Government office | |
| Uruguay | Residencia de Suárez, Montevideo | Official residence | |
| Venezuela | Miraflores Palace, Caracas | Government office | |
| Venezuela | La Casona | Official residence | |

=== Asia ===
| Country | Building | Notes | Image |
|---|---|---|---|
| Afghanistan | Arg, Kabul | Meeting place of the Cabinet of Afghanistan | |
| Armenia | President's House, Yerevan | | |
| Azerbaijan | Zagulba Presidential Residence, Baku | Built in 2008 | |
| Bangladesh | Bangabhaban, Dhaka | Built in 1905 | |
| China | Zhongnanhai, Beijing | Headquarters of the Chinese Communist Party and residence of the General Secretary of the Chinese Communist Party | |
| China | Presidential Palace, Guangzhou | Destroyed in 1922, rebuilt as Sun Yat-sen Memorial Hall | |
| China | Presidential Palace, Nanjing | Former residence from 1927 to 1949, now a museum | |
| Cyprus | Presidential Palace, Nicosia | | |
| East Timor | Nicolau Lobato Presidential Palace, Dili | | |
| India | Rashtrapati Bhavan, New Delhi | Official residence | |
| India | Rashtrapati Nilayam, Hyderabad | Winter retreat | |
| India | Rashtrapati Niwas, Shimla | Summer retreat | |
| Indonesia | Garuda Palace, Nusantara | | |
| Indonesia | Istana Merdeka, Jakarta | | |
| Indonesia | Istana Negara, Jakarta | | |
| Indonesia | Istana Cipanas, Cipanas | | |
| Indonesia | Istana Bogor, Bogor | | |
| Indonesia | Gedung Agung, Yogyakarta | | |
| Indonesia | Istana Tampaksiring, Bali | | |
| Iran | Sa'dabad Palace, Tehran; Office of the Supreme Leader of Iran | | |
| Iraq | Radwaniyah Palace, Baghdad | | |
| Israel | Beit HaNassi, Jerusalem | | |
| Kazakhstan | Ak Orda Presidential Palace, Astana | | |
| North Korea | Ryongsong Residence, Pyongyang | Current residence of the General Secretary of the Workers' Party of Korea | |
| North Korea | Kumsusan Palace of the Sun, Pyongyang | Former residence of the General Secretary of the Workers' Party of Korea | |
| South Korea | Blue House, Seoul | Current residence | |
| South Korea | Presidential Residence of South Korea, Seoul | Former residence | |
| Kyrgyzstan | White House, Bishkek | | |
| Kyrgyzstan | Ala Archa State Residence, Bishkek | Current residence | |
| Laos | Presidential Palace, Vientiane | | |
| Lebanon | Baabda Palace, Beirut | | |
| Maldives | Muliaage, Malé | Built in 1914, as the royal palace for Crown Prince Izzuddin | |
| Mongolia | Government Palace, Ulan Bator | Also seat of government | |
| Myanmar | Presidential Palace, Naypyidaw | Presidential residence and office | |
| Nepal | Rashtrapati Bhavan, Kathmandu, Kathmandu | | |
| Pakistan | Aiwan-e-Sadr, Islamabad | | |
| State of Palestine | Mukataa | | |
| Philippines | Malacañang Palace, Manila | Official residence and workplace | |
| Singapore | Istana, Singapore | | |
| Sri Lanka | President's House, Colombo | | |
| Sri Lanka | President's Pavilion, Kandy | | |
| Syria | Presidential Palace, Damascus | | |
| Syria | Tishreen Palace, Damascus | | |
| Taiwan | Presidential Office Building, Taipei | | |
| Tajikistan | Palace of Nations, Dushanbe | | |
| Turkey | Presidential Compound (Turkey) | | |
| Turkmenistan | Oguzkhan Palace, Ashgabat | | |
| Uzbekistan | Ok Saroy Presidential Palace, Tashkent | Former residence | |
| Uzbekistan | Durmen | Former residence | |
| Uzbekistan | Kuksaroy Presidential Palace, Tashkent | Current residence | |
| United Arab Emirates | Qasr Al Watan, Abu Dhabi | Seat of government | |
| Vietnam | Presidential Palace, Hanoi | | |
| Yemen | Presidential Palace, Sanaa | | |

=== Europe ===
| Country | Building | Notes | Image |
|---|---|---|---|
| Albania | Presidential Palace of Tirana | | |
| Austria | Hofburg Palace, Vienna | | |
| Belarus | Presidential Palace, Minsk | | |
| Bosnia and Herzegovina | Presidency Building, Sarajevo | | |
| Bulgaria | Presidential Palace, Sofia | | |
| Croatia | Presidential Palace, Zagreb | | |
| Czech Republic | Prague Castle, Prague | Main residence | |
| Czech Republic | Lány Castle, Lány | Secondary residence | |
| Estonia | Presidential Palace, Tallinn | | |
| Finland | Presidential Palace, Helsinki | | |
| France | Élysée Palace, Paris | | |
| Germany | Bellevue Palace, Berlin | Primary residence | |
| Germany | Villa Hammerschmidt, Bonn | Secondary residence | |
| Georgia | Orbeliani Presidential Palace, Tbilisi | | |
| Greece | Presidential Mansion, Athens | | |
| Hungary | Sándor Palace, Budapest | | |
| Iceland | Bessastaðir, Álftanes | | |
| Ireland | Áras an Uachtaráin, Dublin | Formerly the seat of the Lord Lieutenant of Ireland (British viceroy) | |
| Italy | Quirinal Palace, Rome | | |
| Latvia | Riga Castle, Riga | | |
| Lithuania | Presidential Palace, Vilnius | | |
| North Macedonia | Villa Vodno, Skopje | | |
| Malta | San Anton Palace, Attard | Official residence | |
| Malta | Verdala Palace, Siġġiewi | Summer residence | |
| Moldova | Presidential Palace, Chișinău | | |
| Montenegro | Blue Palace, Cetinje | | |
| Netherlands | Catshuis, The Hague | Official residence of the Prime Minister | |
| Poland | Presidential Palace, Warsaw | Official workplace | |
| Poland | Belweder, Warsaw | Official residence | |
| Portugal | Belém Palace, Lisbon | | |
| Romania | Cotroceni Palace, Bucharest | | |
| Russia | Grand Kremlin Palace, Moscow | Ceremonial residence | |
| Russia | Kremlin Senate, Moscow | Working residence | |
| Serbia | Novi Dvor, Belgrade | | |
| Slovakia | Grassalkovich Palace, Bratislava | Official workplace | |
| Slovakia | Hohenlohe Hunting Lodge | Recreational residence | |
| Slovenia | Presidential Palace, Ljubljana | Also seat of government | |
| Spain | Palacio de la Moncloa Complex, Madrid | Official Residence and workplace of the Prime Minister | |
| Switzerland | No official presidential residence. | Seat of the government in the Federal Palace of Switzerland | |
| Ukraine | Mariinskyi Palace, Kyiv | | |

=== Oceania ===
| Country | Building | Notes | Image |
|---|---|---|---|
| Fiji | Government House, Suva | | |
| Palau | Capitol of Palau Executive Building | | |

== See also ==
- Presidential palace
- Government House
- Government Palace
- List of official residences
- Category:Prime ministerial residences
