= Governor's House =

Governor's House may refer to:

- Governor's House (Peshawar), Pakistan
- Governor's House (Karachi), Pakistan
- Governor's House (Lahore), Pakistan
- Governor's House, Ufa, Russia
- Governor's House, Edinburgh, Scotland
- Governor's House, Knutsford, Cheshire, England
- Governor's House (Togus, Maine), United States
- Governor's House (Governors Island), New York
- Governor's House (Dnipro), Ukraine
- Delaware Governor's Mansion, sometimes called Governor's House

== See also ==
- Governor's house in Medan, Indonesia
- Governor's Mansion (disambiguation)
- Old Governor's Mansion (disambiguation)
- List of governors' mansions in the United States
- Governor's Palace (disambiguation)
- Raj Bhavan (disambiguation), India
- Belmond Governor's Residence, Yangon, Myanmar, the former home of British governors of Burma
- Government House
- Official residence
