= Governor's Palace =

Governor's Palace may refer to:

- Palace of the Governors, Santa Fe, New Mexico, NRHP-listed
- Spanish Governor's Palace, San Antonio, Texas, NRHP-listed
- Governor's Palace, New Bern, North Carolina, also known as Tryon Palace
- Governor's Palace (Raleigh, North Carolina)
- Governor's Palace (Williamsburg, Virginia)
- Governor's Palace, Chandigarh, Le Corbusier designed building
- Grandmaster's Palace in Valletta, Malta, formerly known as Governor's Palace

== See also ==
- Governor's House (disambiguation)
- Governor's Mansion (disambiguation)
- Old Governor's Mansion (disambiguation)
- List of governors' mansions in the United States
- Government House
