= Hallan =

Hallan may refer to:

== People ==
Notable people with this surname include:

- Gaute Hallan Steiwer (born 1990), Norwegian orienteering competitor
- John Hallan, Canadian merchant and alderman
- Kine Hallan Steiwer (born 1988), Norwegian orienteering competitor
- Toril Hallan, Norwegian ski-orienteering competitor

== Places ==
- Loch Hallan, Outer Hebrides, Scotland
