= Government House, Rangoon =

Official residence of Burma's colonial governors

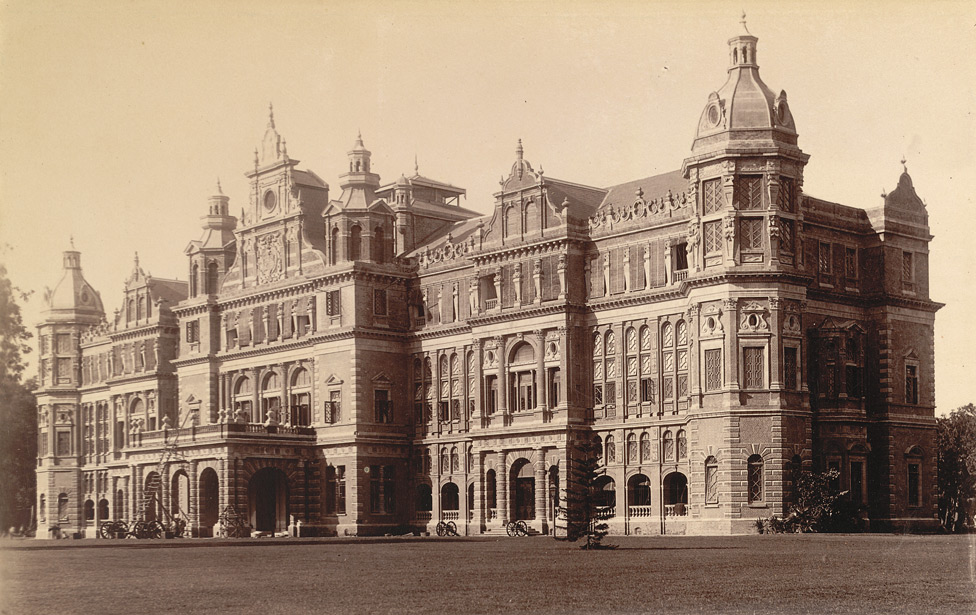
- Government House, Rangoon in 1895
- Interactive map of the Government House, Rangoon area

General information
- Architectural style: Queen Anne style
- Coordinates: 16.795094°N 96.137114°E
- Construction started: 1892
- Completed: 1895
- Demolished: 1985

Design and construction
- Architect: Henry Hoyne-Fox

Government House, Rangoon (Burmese: ဘုရင်ခံအိမ်တော်) was the official residence (Government House) of the colonial governors of Burma.

The building complex, located in north Rangoon, west of Shwedagon Pagoda at the corner of Prome and Ahlone Roads, was designed by British architect Henry Hoyne-Fox and built in between 1892 and 1895, at a cost of 717,000 rupees on a plot of 90 acres (36 ha). The building was built in the Queen Anne Revival style.

The formal handover of power from colonial authorities to the newly formed government of Burma was commemorated at the lawn of the Government House on 4 January 1948. In the following years, it served as the de facto residence for Burmese presidents, including Sao Shwe Thaik, Ba Oo, and Mahn Win Maung.

The building was demolished in 1985 on the orders of Ne Win following earthquake damage in the 1970s. A complex housing the national level People's Assembly was built on the former site of the Government House; it is now home to the Yangon Region Hluttaw.

== Gallery ==
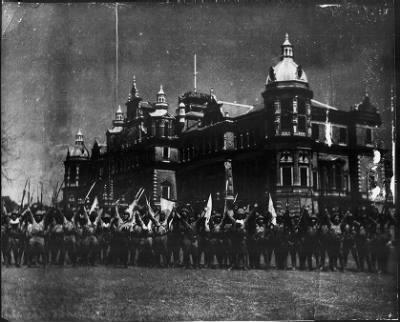
After the fall of Rangoon in March 1942, showing victorious Japanese troops in front of Government House

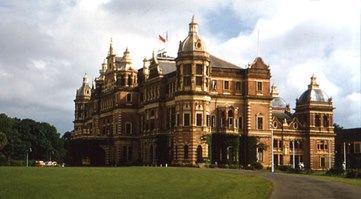
Government House, Rangoon in 1955

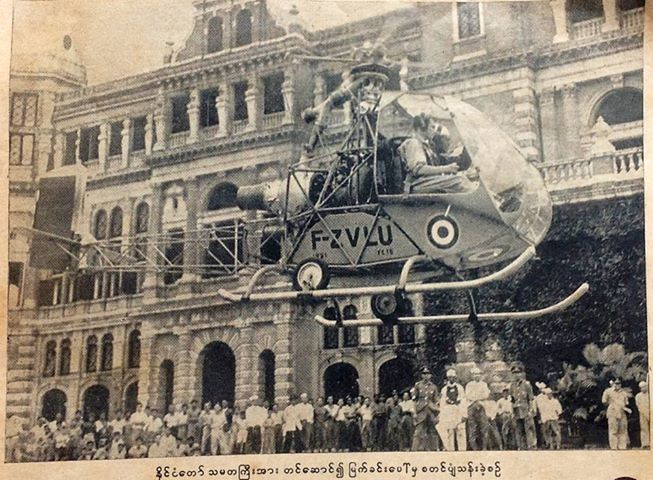
Government House, Rangoon in 1955

== See also ==
- Presidential Palace, Naypyidaw
- Government Houses of the British Empire and Commonwealth
- Belmond Governor's Residence
