= Government Houses in Canada =

Type of official residences

In Canada, Government House is a title given to the official residences of the country's monarch, various viceroys (the governor general, the lieutenant governors), and territorial commissioners. (Note: Though not technically viceroys, the Commissioners of the Canadian territories fill a similar role and their residences are listed here for completion) Though not universal, in most cases the title is also the building's sole name; for example, the sovereign's and governor general's principal residence in Ottawa is known as Government House only in formal contexts, being more generally referred to as Rideau Hall. The use of the term Government House is an inherited custom from the British Empire, where there were and are many government houses.

There is currently no government house for the lieutenant governors of Ontario (repurposed in 1937 and demolished in 1961), Quebec (destroyed by fire in 1966), Alberta (closed in 1938 and repurchased and repurposed in 1964), or the Commissioner of the Northwest Territories. The lieutenant governor of Ontario has a suite within the Ontario Legislative Building, as does the lieutenant governor of Quebec in the Édifice André-Laurendeau.

== Present government houses ==
Building name	Residents' positions	Location	Image	Notes and details	Jurisdiction
Rideau Hall	Governor General of Canada (1867–present)	Ottawa		Functioning official residence; primary residence	Canada
Citadelle of Quebec	Governor General of Canada (1872–present)	Quebec City		Functioning official residence; secondary residence	Canada
Government House	Governor of Nova Scotia (1805–1867); Lieutenant Governor of Nova Scotia (1867–present)	Halifax		Functioning official residence	Nova Scotia
Government House	Governor of New Brunswick (1828–1867); Lieutenant Governor of New Brunswick (1867–1890; 1999–present)	Fredericton		Other uses 1896–1988; presently functioning official residence	New Brunswick
Government House	Lieutenant Governor of Manitoba (1885–present)	Winnipeg		Functioning official residence	Manitoba
Government House	Lieutenant Governor of British Columbia (1959–present)	Victoria		Functioning official residence	British Columbia
Fanningbank	Governor of Prince Edward Island (1834–1873); Lieutenant Governor of Prince Edward Island (1873–present)	Charlottetown		Functioning official residence	Prince Edward Island
Government House	Lieutenant Governor of the North-West Territories (1889–1905); Lieutenant Governor of Saskatchewan (1905–1945)	Regina		Other uses 1945–1984; presently functioning viceregal offices	Saskatchewan
Government House	Governor of Newfoundland (1827–1949); Lieutenant Governor of Newfoundland and Labrador (1949–present)	St. John's		Functioning official residence	Newfoundland and Labrador
Taylor House (412 Main Street)	Commissioner of Yukon (2015–present)	Whitehorse		Private residence 1937–2015; presently functioning official residence	Yukon
Commissioner's Residence (2554 Paurngaq Crescent)	Commissioner of Nunavut (1999–present)	Iqaluit		Functioning official residence	Nunavut

== Former government houses ==
Building name	Residents' positions	Location	Image	Notes
Commissioner's Residence	Commissioner of Yukon (1898–1953)	Dawson City		Now a Parks Canada historic site
Chateau St. Louis	Governor of Quebec (1760–1791); Lieutenant Governor of Lower Canada and Governor General of British North America (1791–1834)	Quebec City		Destroyed by fire, 1834; now site of Château Frontenac
Chateau de Ramezay	Lieutenant Governor of Lower Canada and Governor General of British North America (c. 1834)	Montreal		Now a museum.
Government House	Lieutenant Governor of Upper Canada (1800–1813)	York		Destroyed by explosion, 1813. Site is located with current day Fort York.
Elmsley House	Lieutenant Governor of Upper Canada (1800–1813); Governor General of the Province of Canada (1849–1852, 1856–1858)	Toronto		Destroyed by fire, 1862. Now occupied by Metro Hall and Roy Thomson Hall.
Alwington House	Governor General of the Province of Canada (1841–1844)	Kingston		Damaged by fire, 1958; demolished, 1959. Site now Alwington Place as well as retaining wall for Llynlea (Arthur Davies home) 1963.
Government House	Lieutenant Governor of Ontario (1868–1912)	Toronto		Sold and demolished, 1912.
Chorley Park	Lieutenant Governor of Ontario (1915–1937)	Toronto		Other uses, then demolished 1961. Now site of city park.
Spencerwood	Lieutenant Governor of Quebec (1870–1966)	Quebec City		Destroyed by fire in 1966.
	Lieutenant Governor of the Northwest Territories (1870–1876)	Fort Garry		Capital moved to Fort Livingstone.
	Lieutenant Governor of the Northwest Territories (1876–1877)	Fort Livingstone		Capital moved to Battleford. Now site of Fort Livingstone National Historic Site.
Cary Castle	Governor of Vancouver Island (1865–1866); Governor of the United Colonies of Vancouver Island and British Columbia (1868–1871); Lieutenant Governor of British Columbia (1871–1903)	Victoria		Destroyed by fire 1903.
	Governor of British Columbia (18??–1866); Governor of the United Colonies of Vancouver Island and British Columbia (1866–1868)	New Westminster		Capital moved to Victoria. Now Royal City Manor.
Government House	Lieutenant Governor of British Columbia (190?–1957)	Victoria		Destroyed by fire 1957. Government House rebuilt after fire.
Government House	Lieutenant Governor of the Northwest Territories (1883–1889)	Regina		Replaced 1889, demolished 1908. Now site of Luther College.
Government House	Lieutenant Governor of Alberta (1913–1938)	Edmonton		Other uses 1948 – 1964, now the Alberta Government Conference Centre.
58 St. George's Crescent	Lieutenant Governor of Alberta (1966–2004)	Edmonton		Demolished 2005.
Government House in Fort Townshend	Governor of Newfoundland (1781–1831)	St. John's		
The Monklands	Governor General of the Province of Canada (1844–1849)	Montreal		Capital moved (1849), now Catholic high school, Villa Maria.
Government House	Lieutenant Governor of the Northwest Territories (1878–1883)	Battleford		Capital moved to Regina (1883), building destroyed by fire 2003. Still National historic site with archaeological remains of the destroyed structure.
Lieutenant Governor's Residence	Lieutenant Governor of Cape Breton Island 1786–1820	Sydney, Nova Scotia		Built after 1786 (temporary Government House was used) and used until 1820 when colony dissolved back into Nova Scotia. Later site of Court House and Jail. Since redeveloped into residential area bounded by Desbarres, George, Amelia and Charlotte Streets.

== See also ==
- Government House
- Government Houses of the British Empire and Commonwealth
- Governor's Mansion (disambiguation)
