= Governor's Mansion =

Governor's Mansion or Governor's Residence is a common term for the official residence of a governor. It may refer to:

== India ==
- Portuguese Governor’s Mansion, Pondicherry

== Philippines ==
- Governor's Mansion (Bohol)

== Russia ==
- Governor's Mansion (Tobolsk, Russia), where Nicholas II of Russia was imprisoned

== Myanmar ==
- Belmond Governor's Residence

== United States ==
- List of official governors' residences in the United States
- Unofficial residences:
  - Governor's Mansion (Marshall, Michigan), built in 1839, listed on the National Register of Historic Places
  - Governor's Mansion (Shawnee, Oklahoma), built in 1903, listed on the NRHP

== See also ==
- Old Governor's Mansion (disambiguation)
- Governor's Palace (disambiguation)
- Governor's House (disambiguation)
- Government House
