= Zimbabwe House =

Zimbabwe House may refer to:

- Embassy of Zimbabwe, London, the embassy of Zimbabwe in London which is located in Zimbabwe House
- Zimbabwe House, Harare, a government and former Prime Ministerial residence building in Harare, Zimbabwe
