= Governor's House, Quetta =

Official residence of the governor of Balochistan, Pakistan

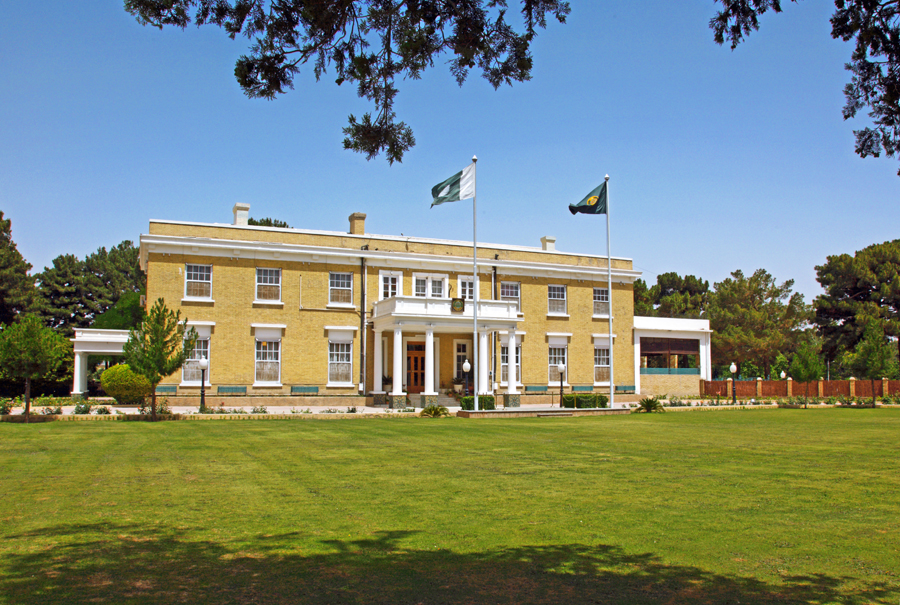
- Main façade of Governor's House
- Former names: Quetta Residency

General information
- Type: Government house
- Architectural style: Colonial
- Location: Zarghun Road, Quetta, Balochistan, Pakistan
- Coordinates: 30.1982°N 67.0059°E
- Current tenants: Governor of Balochistan
- Completed: 1888; 1942
- Destroyed: 1935
- Owner: Government of Balochistan

Technical details
- Floor count: 2
- Grounds: 8.9 ha

Website
- governorbalochistan.gov.pk

Governor's House (Urdu ایوان گورن; Balochi: استاندار ئے لوغ; Pashto: د والي ماڼۍ; Dari: خانه والی), formerly known as the Quetta Residency, is a historical government building located on Zarghun Road in Quetta, Balochistan, Pakistan. It serves as the official residence of the governor of Balochistan.

Originally built in 1888 to house the chief commissioners of Baluchistan during British rule, the building was damaged during the 1935 Quetta earthquake. It was rebuilt by the then viceroy of British India and completed in 1942. Following Pakistan's independence in 1947, it became the principal workplace and residence of the province's chief commissioners and governors. It is recognised as one of several cultural heritage sites in Quetta.

== Location ==
The Governor's House is located on Zarghun Road, which is also the site of several other prominent landmarks and government buildings in Quetta. The Chief Minister's House and the office of the Chief Secretary are situated opposite to Governor's House, while the northern side of the complex faces Mir Jafar Khan Jamali Road. The complex occupies a total area of 8.9 ha (22 acres).

== History ==
Governor's House was established in 1888, originally as the Quetta Residency. It was constructed as the official residence for the chief commissioners of Baluchistan when the region was under the administration of the British Raj. It was a two-story structure built in Victorian style, with a porte cochere at the front entrance supported by four neoclassical columns. The ground level of the façade featured a porch area with a series of arches supporting a covered balustrade on the first floor. The building's portico, made from brick, was topped by a pediment and featured two large doors on the first floor, opening onto an exposed balcony. The roof held two chimney stacks on either side of the portico. Cannon stands were usually positioned on the garden outside the front of the building.

During his royal tour of British India in 1905–06, Prince George, Duke of York (later King George V) is known to have visited the residency along with his spouse, Princess Victoria Mary, and planted a chinar sapling. Amongst those who were present to receive the royals at the residency was Shahbaz Khan Bugti, chief of the Bugti tribe. During the 1935 Quetta earthquake, the building underwent significant structural damage. Subsequently, it was recommissioned and refurnished by the viceroy of British India at the time and completed in 1942. The new building, finished in colonial style with a new façade, functions as the present structure. Its exterior is constructed from mudbrick and partially from burnt bricks.

After Pakistan's independence in 1947, the house became the residence of the provincial chief commissioners up until 1955. The founder and first governor-general of Pakistan, Muhammad Ali Jinnah, notably spent some of his last days at the Quetta Residency. Jinnah had been advised by his physician to relocate from his Ziarat Residency to the lower altitudes of Quetta, on account of his worsening lung health. He spent a month at the Quetta Residency, until he was flown to Karachi where he died in September 1948. In February 1961, Queen Elizabeth II and Prince Philip, Duke of Edinburgh arrived at the Quetta Residency while visiting the city during their first royal tour of Pakistan. Following the tradition of her grandfather George V, Elizabeth planted a pine sapling at the complex.

With the abolishment of the One Unit Scheme, which lasted from 1955 to 1970, and the restoration of Balochistan's provincial status, the Quetta Residency became the official residence of the subsequent governors of Balochistan and was thereafter known as the Governor's House. During the prime ministership of Imran Khan, the doors of Governor's House were opened for public access for the first time in October 2018. There were plans to convert the house into a museum and transform the adjoining lawns into a women's park, which did not materialise.

== Description ==
The sprawling grounds of Governor's House contain up to 1,500 different species of trees. The complex has its own zoo and aviary, which is home to several different types of fauna. There is also a statue installed outside of Sir Hugh Shakespear Barnes, who served as the chief commissioner of Baluchistan for multiple terms in the late 19th century.

The interior of the house features relics, artefacts and furniture from both the British era and the post-independence period. The Darbar Hall of Governor's House is known for its wooden sprung floor, which was purposefully installed during the British period for use as a dancing floor. The light fittings include a set of Persian chandeliers which were gifted by the last Shah of Iran. There is a portrait of every ruling governor of Balochistan up until the present time. Amongst the artwork hanging inside Governor's House is an original piece of calligraphy commissioned by Sadequain in 1980 and valued at one crore rupees, gifted by the artist himself.

== Personnel ==
The permanent staff of Governor's House usually comprises a senior civil servant, known as the principal secretary, and a military secretary who is a serving officer of the Pakistan Armed Forces. Both secretaries report to the governor's office. The principal secretary heads a team of administrative officers which includes a director, additional secretaries, a public relations officer, junior secretaries and section officers. The military secretary oversees the comptroller and protocol officer's functions.

== Gallery ==
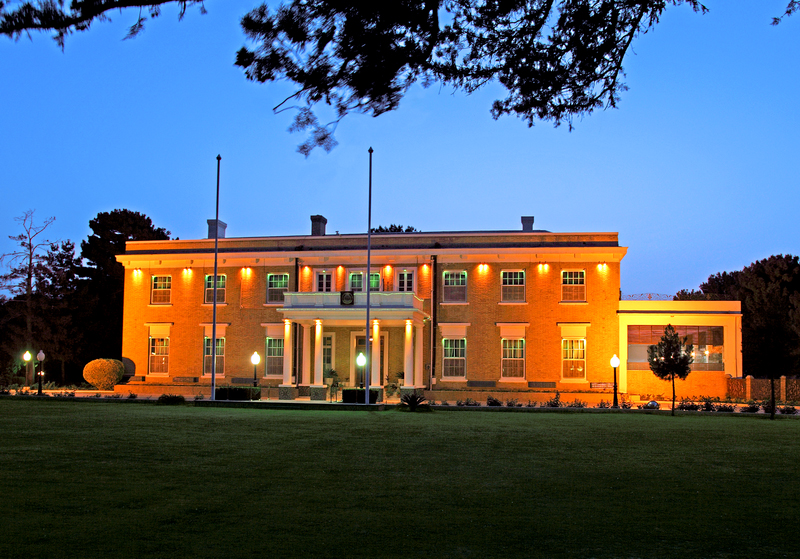
Façade of Governor's House at evening time.

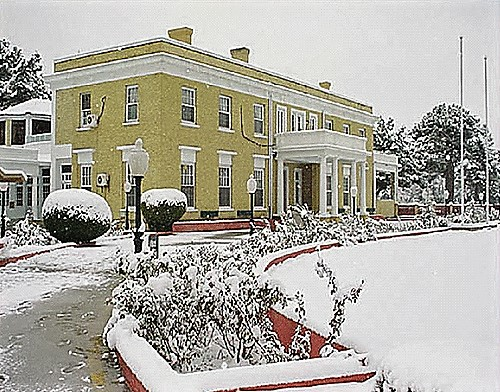
Governor's House in winter.

== See also ==
- Governor's House, Karachi
- Governor's House, Lahore
- Governor's House, Peshawar
