= Blue Roof =

House in Harare

- Interactive map of the Blue Roof area

General information
- Type: Official residence
- Architectural style: Chinese
- Location: Borrowdale, Harare, Zimbabwe
- Coordinates: 17°43′12″S 31°09′03″E
- Completed: 2006
- Cost: £30 million
- Owner: Mugabe family

Blue Roof is the common name given to a mansion and former presidential palace in the suburb of Borrowdale in Harare, Zimbabwe. It was built in 2006 by the ZANU-PF political party as a family home for the then President of Zimbabwe Robert Mugabe. Following his death, ownership was transferred to the Mugabe family.

== History ==
Robert Mugabe had been the Prime Minister and later President of Zimbabwe following its independence from the United Kingdom and reconstitution from the unrecognised Rhodesia. Previously he had occupied Zimbabwe House as Prime Minister and later State House as President with both being in Harare. Mugabe claimed plans were made in 1986 to build a new presidential palace for his family. In 2003, ZANU-PF signed a contract with a Yugoslavian firm to build it providing the Zimbabweans provided the materials. Mugabe claimed the construction was funded by donations from China and Malaysia as well as other countries. The Prime Minister of Malaysia Mahathir Mohamad donated RM100,000 worth of Malaysian timber for the construction. The total cost was estimated to be around £3 million and it took three years to build. It gained the nickname of "Blue Roof" due to the blue coloured tiles from Shanghai, China used on the roof.

In 2006, in preparation for the end of construction, Mugabe ordered a number of measures were put in. Owners of properties surrounding the palace were sent letters saying they faced eviction from their homes due to them being within a security area. Critics alleged that was because Mugabe did not want people living near him. Access to foot and vehicular traffic would also be restricted similar to the measures Mugabe had put in around State House.

Following the 2017 Zimbabwean coup d'état which removed Mugabe from office, he was placed under house arrest at Blue Roof by the Zimbabwe Defence Forces. Following Mugabe's death in 2019, his body lay in state at Blue Roof. Afterwards there was doubt as to who owned the mansion. ZANU-PF claimed they owned it and hired a lawyer to ensure it was not listed as part of Mugabe's estate. Despite reports it would become a museum, ZANU-PF announced they were handing it over to Mugabe's family to help ensure their security.
