= State House, Bulawayo =

Presidential house in Bulawayo

State House
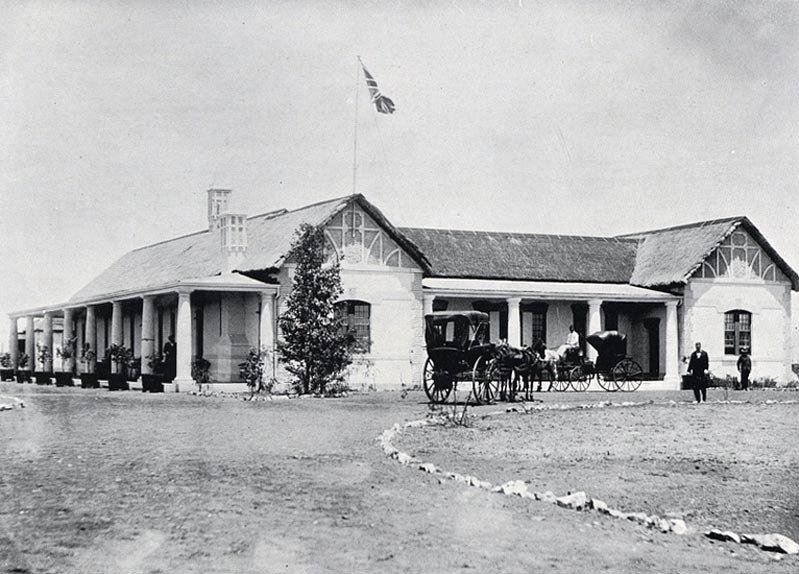
- Government House under BSAC rule (1899)
- Former names: Government House

General information
- Type: Official residence
- Architectural style: Cape Dutch
- Location: Bulawayo, Zimbabwe
- Completed: 1897
- Renovated: 2018
- Owner: Government of Zimbabwe

Design and construction
- Architect: Cecil Rhodes

State House, formerly called Government House, is a former Government House in Bulawayo, Zimbabwe. It was used by the British South Africa Company during their rule in Rhodesia. It was built by Cecil Rhodes in 1897 as his personal residence. It is now used as the official Bulawayo residence for the President of Zimbabwe.

== History ==
The ground which Government House was built on was formerly the site of a kraal where Lobengula, King of the Northern Ndebele people won a battle. When it was built by Cecil Rhodes, it was one of the first permanent British buildings constructed in Rhodesia. The garden contained a large tree under which Rhodes and Lobengula negotiated treaties. It was intended to be Rhodes' personal residence and was designed based on Groote Schuur in Cape Town in the Cape Colony.

Following Southern Rhodesia gaining responsible government, it became a British government property. In 1964, the British Prime Minister Harold Wilson met Joshua Nkomo of the then banned Zimbabwe African People's Union there to discuss Southern Rhodesian independence under black rule against the wishes of the Prime Minister of Southern Rhodesia Ian Smith. When Smith declared Rhodesia an independent country unilaterally under minority rule, it became an official residence of the Prime Minister of Rhodesia and was the location of Smith's last official public engagement as Prime Minister before the establishment of Zimbabwe Rhodesia.

Following the establishment of Zimbabwe in 1980, the Prime Minister Robert Mugabe demanded it be renamed State House, alongside Government House in Salisbury (Harare). It was in a state of disrepair by 2011 and was rarely used; reportedly, even the toilets were broken. Despite this, state events were still occasionally held at the property.

A major restoration of the house was commenced in 2018, following the installation of President Emmerson Mnangagwa. Its renovation, alongside that of the Harare residence, was deemed by the Director of State Residences Douglas Tapfuma as a matter of national pride: "These are the houses that show the status of our nation and surely, they should be maintained to those levels."
