= Loch Hallan =

- Loch Thallan (Scottish Gaelic)
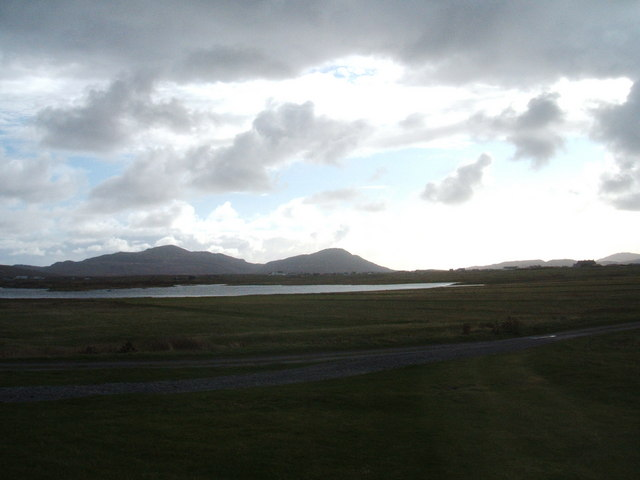

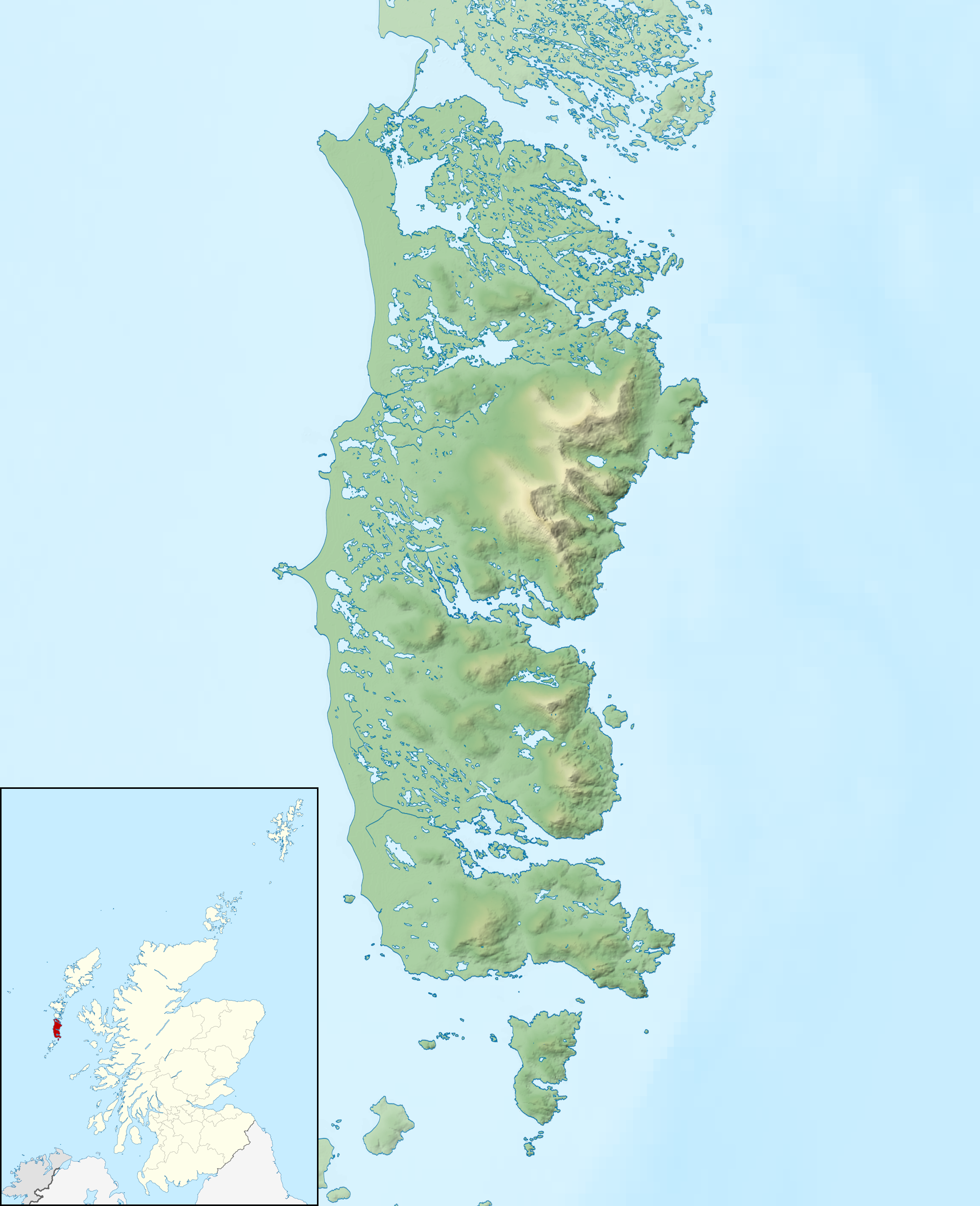
- Location within South Uist
- Location: South Uist, Outer Hebrides, Scotland
- Coordinates: 57.17010117°N 7.39752579°W
- Type: lake

Loch Hallan (Scottish Gaelic: Loch Thallan) is a loch in the Outer Hebrides, Scotland. It is located in the parish of South Uist, approximately 1 mile south of Askernish and half a mile northwest of Daliburgh. It was designated a Site of Special Scientific Interest by Scottish Natural Heritage in 1988.
