= Presidential palace =

Official residence or workplace of a president

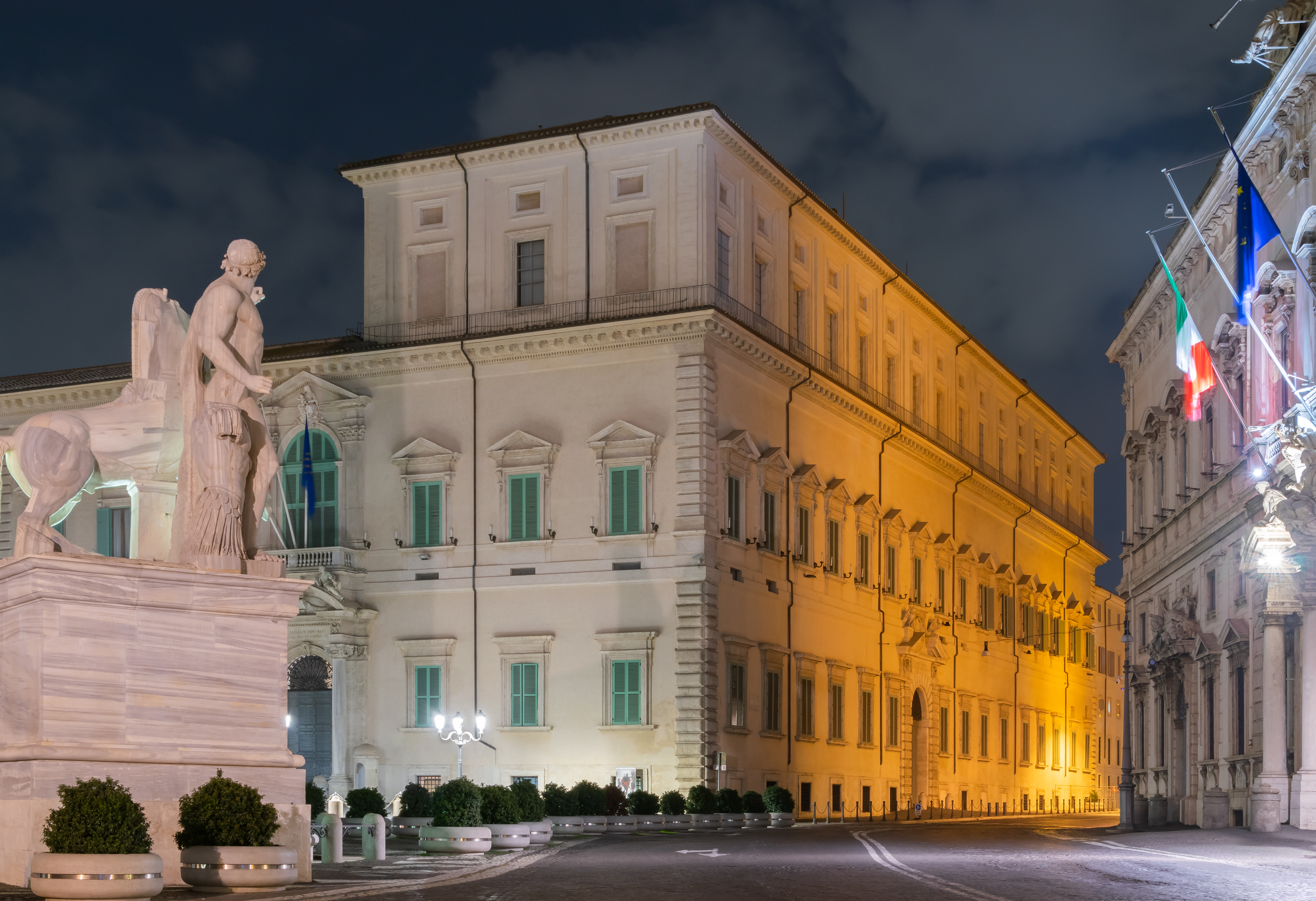
Quirinal Palace in Rome at night, Lazio, Italy

A presidential palace is the official residence, primary workplace, or ceremonial seat of a president in a republican form of government. Beyond functioning as executive offices, these complexes often serve as principal symbols of state sovereignty, administrative power, and architectural heritage.

== Origins and history ==
Many presidential palaces were not originally built for elected heads of state. Instead, they represent adapted historical structures preserved during transitions in governance:

- Former royal and imperial residences: In nations that transitioned from monarchy to republic, former royal palaces were frequently repurposed for executive governance. Examples include the Élysée Palace in France, the Quirinal Palace in Italy, and the Hofburg Palace in Austria.
- Colonial governors' mansions: In post-colonial republics, the vice-regal or executive compounds used by colonial governors were often retained as presidential residences upon independence, such as Áras an Uachtaráin in Ireland or Rashtrapati Bhavan in India (formerly the Viceroy's House).
- Purpose-built complexes: Many modern republics have commissioned custom-designed complexes intended to project national identity or accommodate modern government infrastructure. Examples include the White House in the United States, Palácio da Alvorada in Brazil, and the Presidential Complex in Turkey.

== Functions and design ==
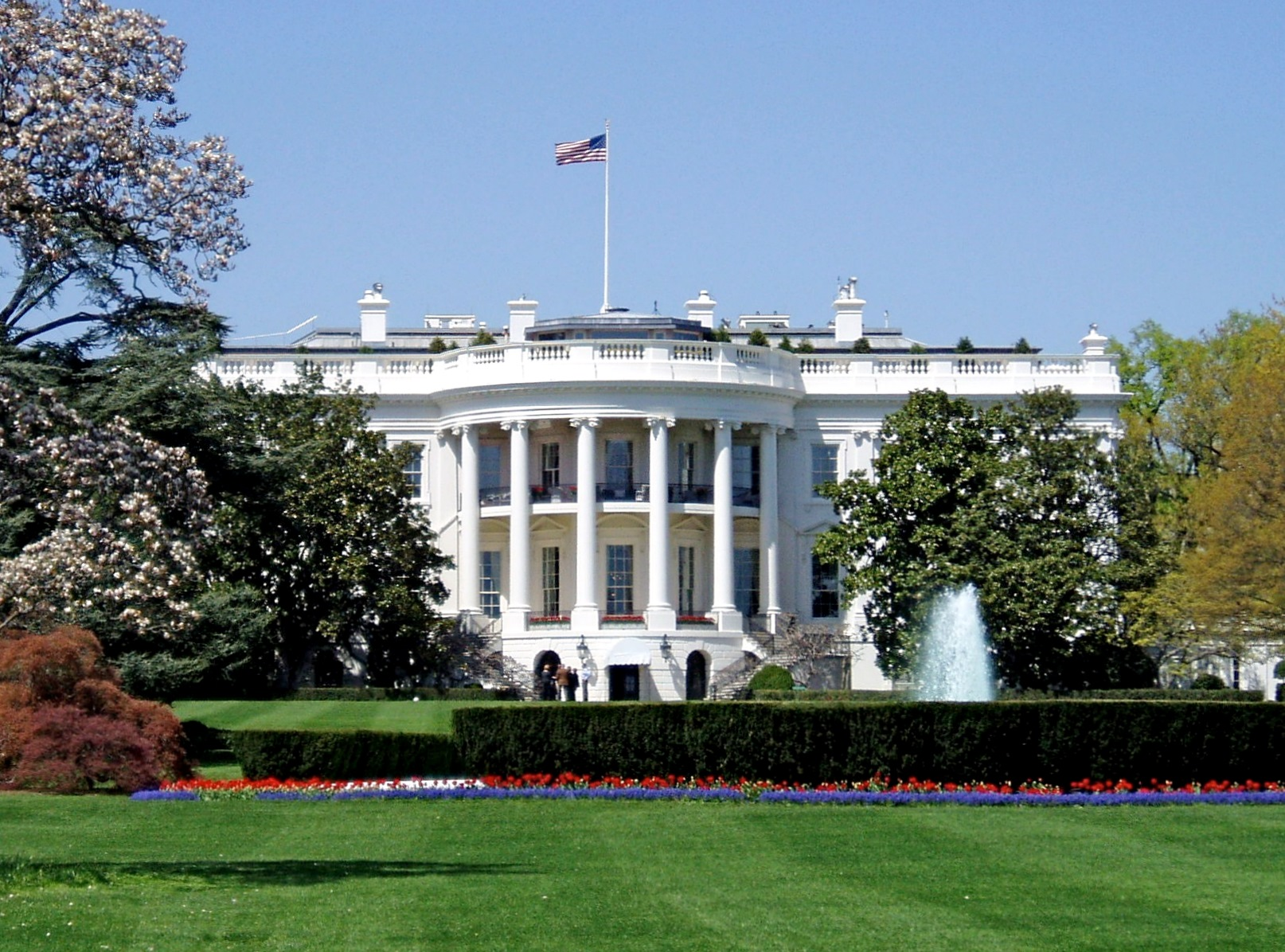
White House, the executive mansion of the President of the United States, located at 1600 Pennsylvania Avenue in Washington, D.C.

While primary residential suites exist within many presidential palaces, these structures usually serve multiple civic and government functions:

- Executive offices: Housing the offices of the president, cabinet officials, national security councils, and administrative staff.
- State receptions: Hosting bilateral summits, diplomatic banquets, credential presentations for foreign ambassadors, and state dinners.
- Symbolic and ceremonial space: Serving as a backdrop for national addresses, swearing-in ceremonies, and public celebrations.

Architecturally, presidential palaces are frequently designed to reflect national cultural motifs, grand classical proportions, or modern modernist aesthetics. Due to their political significance, they are typically protected by specialized military units or state security forces.

== Separation of working and residential spaces ==
In several nations, the working executive office is separated from the official family residence to ensure public access, administrative security, or privacy. For example:

- In Argentina, the Casa Rosada serves as the executive office, while the Quinta de Olivos serves as the private residence.
- In Brazil, the Palácio do Planalto is the official workplace, whereas the Palácio da Alvorada is the official residence.
- In United States, the White House integrates both working offices (the West Wing) and executive residential quarters within a single complex.

== List of presidential palaces ==
Most recognized sovereign states maintain one or more presidential residences.

== See also ==
- Official residence
- Government House
- Government Palace
- List of official residences
