= Old Governor's Mansion =

Old Governor's Mansion may refer to:

- Old Governor's Mansion, part of the Sharlot Hall Museum (Prescott, Arizona)
- Old Governor's Mansion (Milledgeville, Georgia)
- Old Governor's Mansion (Frankfort, Kentucky)
- Old Governor's Mansion (Baton Rouge, Louisiana)
- Old Governor's Mansion (Columbus, Ohio)
- Old Governor's Mansion (Madison, Wisconsin)

== See also ==
- Governor's Mansion (disambiguation)
- Governor's House (disambiguation)
