= Governor's House, Karachi =

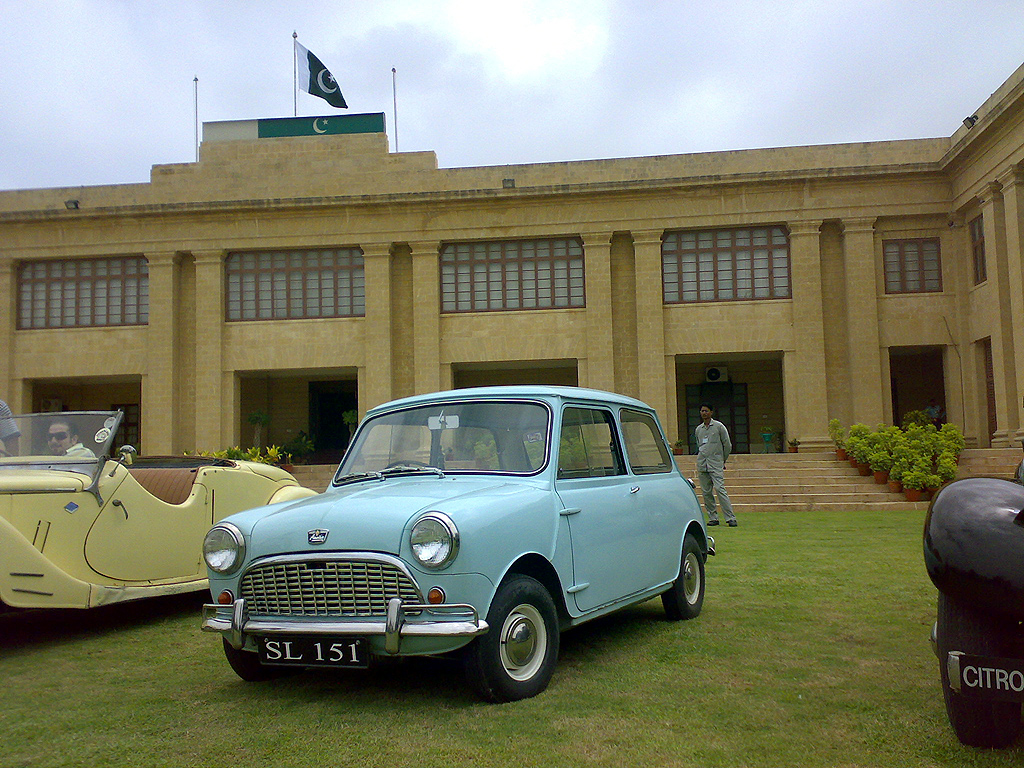
- Alternative names: Sindh Governor House

General information
- Location: Aiwan-e-Sadar Road, Karachi
- Coordinates: 24°51′03″N 67°01′34″E
- Completed: 1941; 85 years ago
- Owner: Government of Sindh

The Governor's House (Urdu: خانه حاکم), officially known as Sindh Governor House, and also known by its former names including Government House, Governor-General's House and President's House, is a palace in Karachi, Sindh, Pakistan. It is the official residence of the governor of Sindh. The current governor of Sindh is Syed Nehal Hashmi. It is located along the Aiwan-e-Sadar Road of Karachi.

Built in 1939, it is a historical building and has been the residence of several prominent figures, including the Commissioners and pre-independence British governors of Sindh, followed by the Governors-General of Pakistan, the President of Pakistan and then by the Governors of present-day Sindh province.

== History ==
=== Old Government House ===
The Sindh Governor House is located on the original site of the now-demolished Government House, which was built in the year 1843 by Sir Charles Napier while Sindh was part of the British Raj. The Government House had been constructed for Napier's personal use. When Napier left in 1847, the house was bought by the Government of British India and used as an official residence by the Commissioners of Sindh up until 1936.

=== British Raj ===
The construction of the present Governor House building started in the year 1936 by renowned architect R.T. Russel and was completed in 1939, at a cost of 700,000 rupees. The new building was built to replace the Government House, which had been in a state of disrepair and was no longer suitable for habitation. Sir Lancelot Graham, the first Governor of Sindh, laid the foundation stone of the building and started using it as his residence in 1939. After Graham, the succeeding governors of Sindh, Sir Hugh Dow (1941–1946) and Sir Francis Mudie (1946–1947), also lived in the building.

=== Post-independence ===
Following Pakistan's independence in August 1947 and Karachi's designation as the country's capital, the building became the residence of Muhammad Ali Jinnah, the founder of Pakistan and its first Governor-General. From that point onward, the building became known as the "Governor-General's House" and was used as an official residence by all Governor-Generals of Pakistan who succeeded Jinnah. Jinnah had continued to reside in the house until his death in September 1948.

In 1956, the post of Governor-General was abolished and replaced by the President of Pakistan, thus making the last governor-general of Pakistan, Iskandar Mirza, the country's first elected president. The building was thereafter referred to as the "President's House."

By the 1970s, Karachi was no longer the capital of Pakistan; the federal government was shifted to Islamabad. With the dissolution of the One Unit scheme and revival of provinces, Karachi was designated the capital city of Sindh. The house eventually became the residence of the Governor of Sindh and continues to be so as of present.

== See also ==
- Governor of Sindh
- Government Houses of the British Empire and Commonwealth
- Governor's House (Lahore)
- Governor's House (Peshawar)
- Governor's House (Quetta)
