= State House, Harare =

Official residence of the President of Zimbabwe

State House
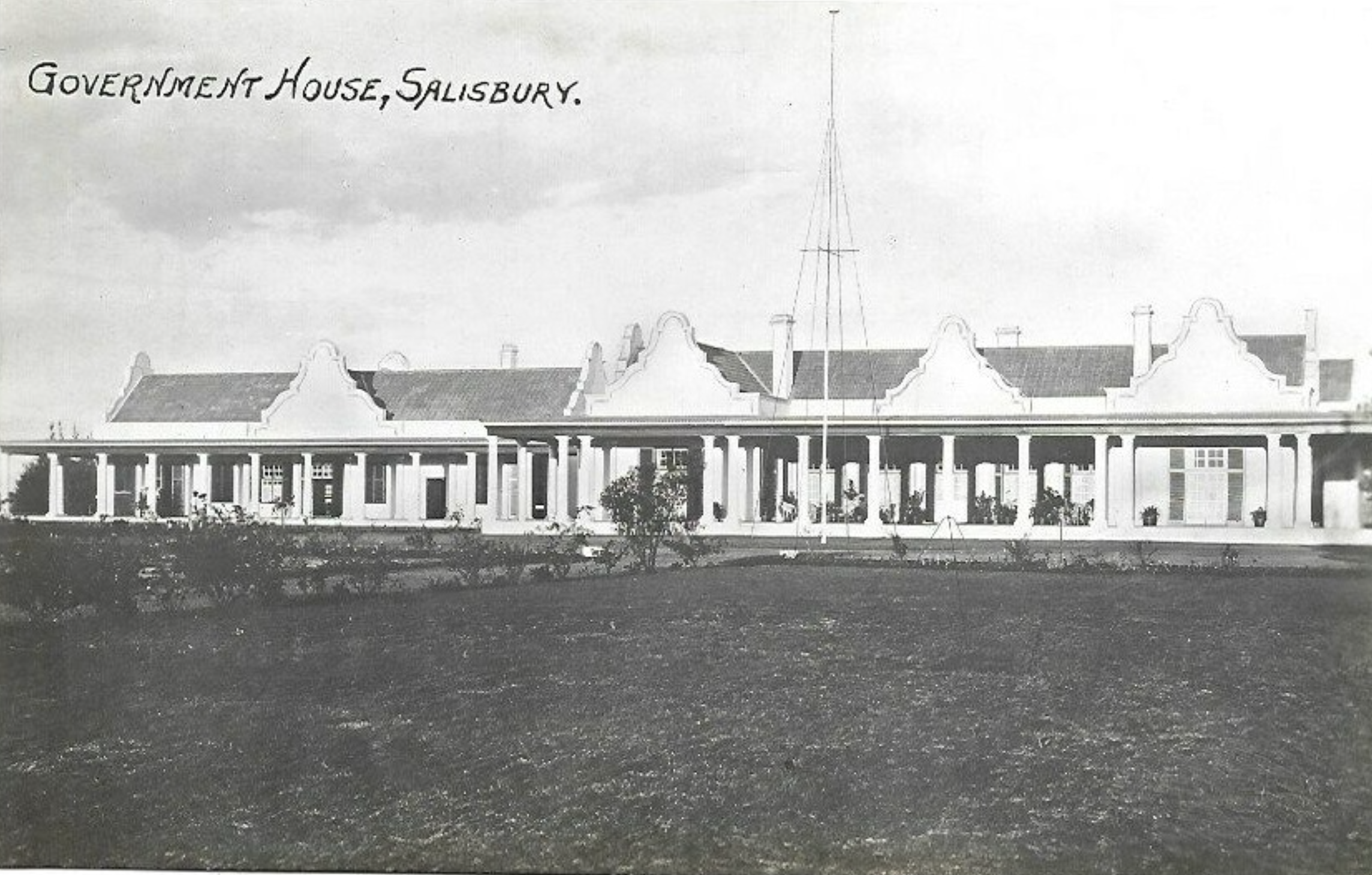
- State House c. 1911
- Former names: Government House

General information
- Type: Official residence
- Architectural style: Cape Dutch revival
- Location: Harare, Zimbabwe
- Coordinates: 17°48′43″S 31°03′29″E
- Current tenants: President of Zimbabwe, Emmerson Mnangagwa
- Completed: 1910
- Owner: Government of Zimbabwe

Design and construction
- Architect: Detmar Jellings Blow
- Main contractor: William Cubitt & Co

State House, formerly known as Government House, is the official residence of the President of Zimbabwe and is located in Harare, Zimbabwe. It was previously used by the Administrator of Southern Rhodesia, Governor of Southern Rhodesia and the Governor-General of the Federation of Rhodesia and Nyasaland in addition to being occupied by the internationally unrecognised Rhodesian Officer Administering the Government and later President of Rhodesia. It was constructed in 1910 to a design by Detmar Blow in the Cape Dutch revival style.

== History ==
=== The Residency, 1895–1923 ===
The Residency on the corner of Baines Avenue and Second Street was constructed in 1895 by Edward Arthur Maund as the home of the Resident Commissioner of the British South Africa Company that governed Rhodesia under Company rule to replace the Old Government House. The Residency was purchased outright by the Company in 1901 for £3,500. It shared the official government residence status in Rhodesia with Government House in Bulawayo which was constructed as the home of the founder of Rhodesia, Cecil Rhodes in 1897. After the residency ceased use by the commissioner in 1923, it retained its use as an official residence for prominent political leaders in Southern Rhodesia including: Attorney-General Robert Hudson (1924–1932), Minister of Agriculture Frank Ernest Harris (1933–1942), Chief Justice Sir Robert Hudson (1943–1946), Minister of Mines George Arthur Davenport (1946–1950), Minister John Moore Caldicott (1950–1963) and Minister The Duke of Montrose (1963–1968).

=== Government House, 1910–1980 ===
Government House was designed to be the residence of the Administrator of Southern Rhodesia, in contrast to the nearby residency occupied by the Company Commissioner, and was built in 1910 in the Cape Dutch revival style by English architect Detmar Jellings Blow, who although never visiting southern Africa himself worked on designs for the Statue of Jan van Riebeeck in Cape Town and extensions for Government House, Bulawayo at the same time. The construction was undertaken by William Cubitt & Co.

Government House was the home of the Administrator of Southern Rhodesia (1910–1923), the Governor of Southern Rhodesia (1923–1953; 1963–1969; 1979–1980) and the Governor-General of the Federation of Rhodesia and Nyasaland (1953–1963). During the Federation, the Governor of Southern Rhodesia resided in Governor's Lodge in the suburb of Highlands.

Following Rhodesia's Unilateral Declaration of Independence on 11 November 1965, the Governor of Southern Rhodesia Sir Humphrey Gibbs refused to leave the building to recognise the Rhodesian government as he declared he had dismissed them when they declared independence but the government continued to meet claiming they had abolished the Governor's office. The Prime Minister of Rhodesia Ian Smith asked Gibbs to leave Government House but Gibbs refused, citing he was still legally the Governor and the Queen's representative. On the day of UDI, Rhodesian Army officers approached Gibbs in Government House asking for a warrant to arrest Smith but Gibbs declined to issue one. In response Rhodesian authorities removed his official cars and any signposts nearby bearing the name of "Governor's office". They also cut off telephones and electricity to Government House and only addressed letters to it as "Stand 8060, Salisbury" by refusing to call it Government House. They sent Gibbs monthly bills of Rh£800 for rent, which he refused to pay as the Rhodesian authorities also stopped his salary. Gibbs survived on donations from his Rhodesian supporters. Gibbs would continue to fly the Union Jack from the house as a symbol of defiance to Smith, who lived in Independence House opposite Government House. Gibbs would only leave in 1969 after resigning following Rhodesia voting to become a republic.

After Gibbs left, Clifford Dupont moved in as the Rhodesian recognised representative of the Queen as Officer Administering the Government and later President of Rhodesia when the republic was established on 2 March 1970 at Government House. Government House continued to serve as the location for official Rhodesian state events.

=== State House, 1980–present ===
Following the independence of Zimbabwe, it was renamed "State House" and was used as the residence of the President. During his time in office, Zimbabwe's first President Canaan Banana was accused of engaging in homosexual rape on several members of staff in State House. Following amendments to the country's Constitution in 1987, Robert Mugabe, Prime Minister since independence, became the new President, serving as both head of state and head of government. Following an earlier attack on the Prime Minister's residence in 1982, a 6pm curfew had been introduced to prevent any traffic passing in front of State House, which was not removed until 2017. In 2006, Mugabe moved his personal residence from State House to a newly constructed mansion in the Borrowdale suburb. State House was retained as the location for official receptions. In 2011, a report from 2008 was leaked alleging that State House was being used as a location by the Central Intelligence Organisation for state torture and abductions.

In 2016, Mugabe unveiled a 3.7 m (12 ft) tall statue of himself in the grounds of State House. After Mugabe was removed from office, it was reported that he left State House in a poor condition that was so bad it prevented his successor Emmerson Mnangagwa from moving in.

== See also ==
- State House (Bulawayo)
