= John Hallam (alderman) =

Canadian merchant

- Born: Chorley, Lancashire, UK
- Died: Toronto
- Occupations: Merchant, Alderman
- Known for: After his death one of his properties was turned into Ontario's most opulent vice-regal residence

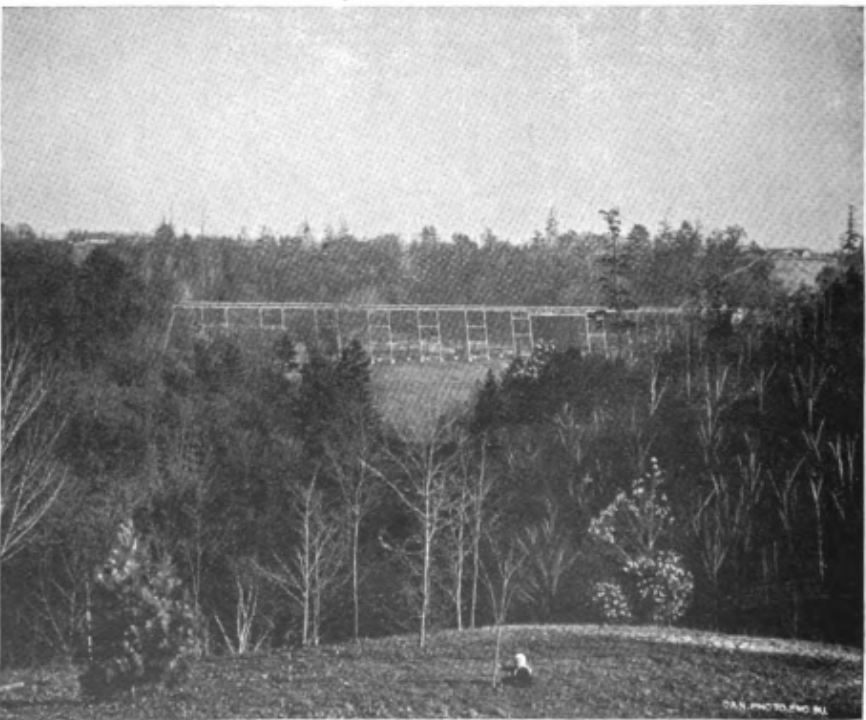
View from Hallan's extensive property, Chorley Park.

John Hallam (1833–1900) was a merchant, and alderman, living in Toronto, Ontario, Canada. He is best known for being the prior owner of Chorley Park, a large estate, that backed on to the valley of the Don River, acquired after his death, on which was constructed an opulent official residence for the Lieutenant Governor of Ontario.

He was born in Chorley, Lancashire, UK, and started work in a calico print mill at the age of seven. He emigrated to Canada in 1856. In 1882, Alderman Hallam prepared a report for Toronto city council on free libraries. In 1883 Hallam championed a ballot initiative that authorized the city to start providing a free library service.

In 1894, The New York Times noted that Hallam was a prominent Toronto resident backing a plan to build a canal from Collingwood, Ontario, on Lake Huron, to Toronto. The New York Times described this canal as representing competition to New York state's Erie Canal and Oswego Canal.

In 1896 Hallam stood in for mayor Robert Fleming, and introduced a mock Parliament, that debated whether men should have the vote. The event was a fund-raiser for the women's suffrage movement.
