= Government House =

Official residences of the Commonwealth

Government House is the name of many of the official residences of governors-general, governors and lieutenant-governors in the Commonwealth and British Overseas Territories. The name is also used in some other countries.

== Government Houses in the Commonwealth of Nations ==
=== Anguilla ===
- Government House, Old Ta is the official residence of the governor of Anguilla.

=== Antigua and Barbuda ===
- Government House, St. John's is the official residence of the Governor-General of Antigua and Barbuda. The Governor of Antigua and Barbuda formerly lived there.
- Government House, Codrington is the former official residence of the warden of Barbuda.

=== Australia ===
- Government House, Canberra, commonly known as Yarralumla, is the official residence of the Governor General of Australia.
- Admiralty House, Kirribilli is the Governor General's official residence in Sydney.
- Government Houses for the state Governors exist also in each state and the Northern Territory:
  - Government House, Sydney in New South Wales
    - Old Government House, Parramatta, used between 1800 and 1847
  - Government House, Melbourne in Victoria; between 1901 and 1930 used by the Governor-General
  - Government House, Brisbane in Queensland
    - Old Government House, Queensland, used between 1862 and 1909
  - Government House, Norfolk Island, residence of the Administrator of Norfolk Island
  - Government House, Perth in Western Australia
  - Government House, Adelaide in South Australia
  - Government House, Hobart in Tasmania
  - Government House, Darwin in the Northern Territory
  - Government House, West Island in the Cocos (Keeling) Islands

=== The Bahamas ===
- Government House, Duke Street, Nassau is the official residence of the Governor-General of the Bahamas, and formerly of the Governor of the Bahamas.

=== Barbados ===
- Government House is the former name of State House, the official residence of the President of Barbados. It is located on Government Hill, St. Michael, Barbados. Both the Governor of Barbados and the Governor-General of Barbados formerly lived there.

=== Belize ===
- Belize House, Belmopan is the official residence of the Governor-General of Belize.
  - Government House, Belize City was the official residence of the former Governors of British Honduras (later Governors of Belize from 1973 to 1981) and used by the Governor-General of Belize between 1981 and 1984. The building is now the Museum of Culture.

=== Bermuda ===
- Government House, Hamilton is the official residence of the Governor of Bermuda.

=== The British Virgin Islands ===
- Government House, Road Town, Tortola is the official residence of the Governor of the British Virgin Islands.

=== Canada ===
- Rideau Hall (officially Government House) in Ottawa is the official residence of the monarch and Governor General of Canada.
- Citadelle of Quebec in Quebec City, Quebec, is a second official residence for the monarch and governor general and is normally occupied for several weeks each year.
- Government Houses or official residences exist for all the provincial lieutenant governors and territorial commissioners except in Alberta (whose Government House is not a viceregal residence), Quebec Ontario, and the Northwest Territories.

=== The Cayman Islands ===
Government House, Seven Mile Beach, Grand Cayman is the official residence of the Governor of the Cayman Islands.

=== Dominica ===
Government House, Roseau is the official residence of the President of Dominica. Prior to independence in 1978, the Governor of Dominica lived there.

=== The Falkland Islands ===
Government House, Stanley is the residence of the Governor of the Falkland Islands. It was the scene of a battle with Argentine troops during the 1982 invasion.

=== Fiji ===
Government House, Suva is located on Victoria Parade, Suva. It is the home of the President of Fiji and was built in 1928 to replace the original building – the residence of the colonial governor – which burnt to the ground after being struck by lightning in 1921. Both the Governor of Fiji and the Governor-General of Fiji formerly lived there.

=== The Gambia ===
Government House is the former name of State House, the official residence of the President of the Gambia. Both the Governor of The Gambia and the Governor-General of the Gambia formerly lived there.

=== Grenada ===
Government House, Saint George's is the former residence of the Governor-General of Grenada. It was damaged by Hurricane Ivan in 2004 and has since been abandoned. There is a proposal for its reconstruction.

=== Gilbert and Ellice Islands ===
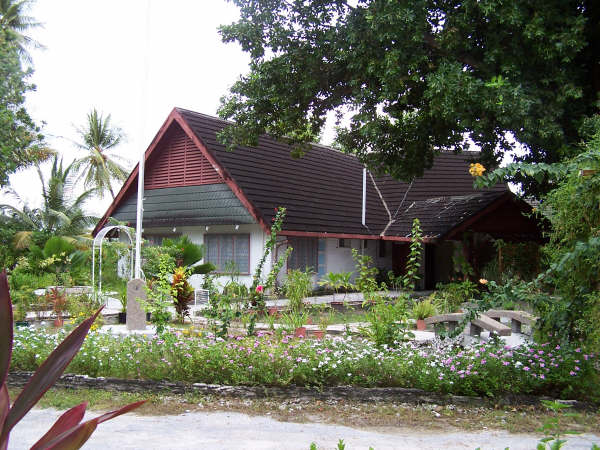
The Presidential residence, former Government House, Bairiki.

A Government House of Gilbert and Ellice Islands was created in South Tarawa on 1 January 1972. It became the Presidential Residency of Kiribati on 12 July 1979.

=== Guyana ===
- Government House is the former name of State House, which is the official residence of the President of Guyana.

=== Hong Kong ===
Government House, Hong Kong is located on Government Hill in the Central, Hong Kong of Hong Kong Island and the official residence of the Chief executive of Hong Kong.

=== India ===
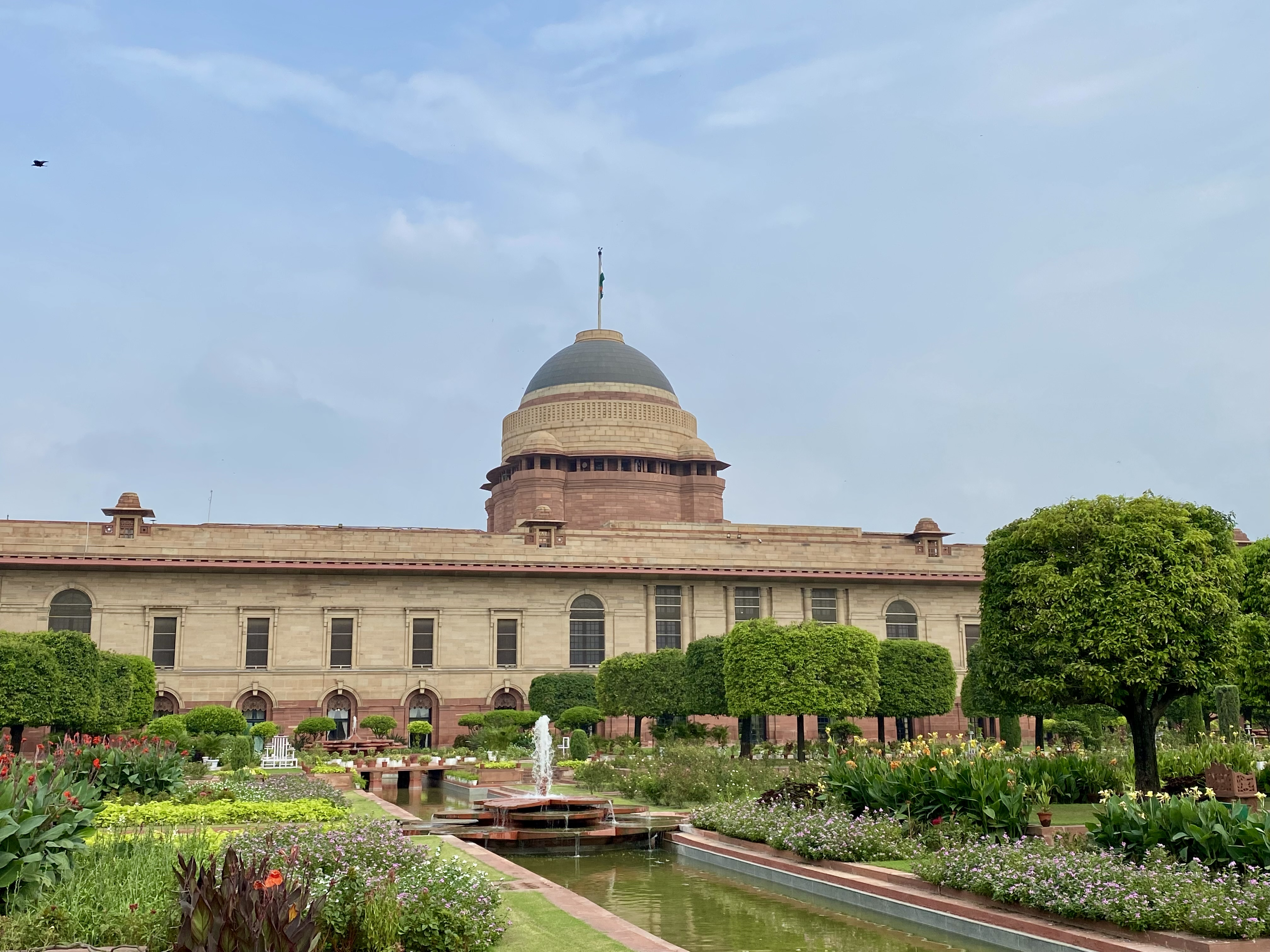
Rashtrapati Bhavan, originally Viceroy's House (1931-47) and Government House (1947-50).

Rashtrapati Bhavan was originally Viceroy's House (1931-47), the official residence of the Viceroy of India. While India was an independent dominions between 1947 and 1950, it was named "Government House" instead, and was the residence of the Governor-General of India. Since 1950, it has been the residence of the President of India.

Raj Bhavan, Kolkata was the Viceroy's residence until the capital of India shifted from Calcutta to New Delhi in 1911, when the Governor of Bengal moved in.

=== Ireland ===
Áras an Uachtaráin was formerly the Viceregal Lodge when the position of Lord Lieutenant of Ireland was abolished in 1922. The Governor-General of the Irish Free State lived there until 1932. Since 1938, the President of Ireland has lived there.

=== The Isle of Man ===
Government House, Governor's Road, Onchan is the official residence of the Lieutenant Governor Lieutenant General Sir John Lorimer, His Majesty's representative on the Island.

=== Jamaica ===
King's House, Jamaica, is also known as Government House.

=== Jersey ===
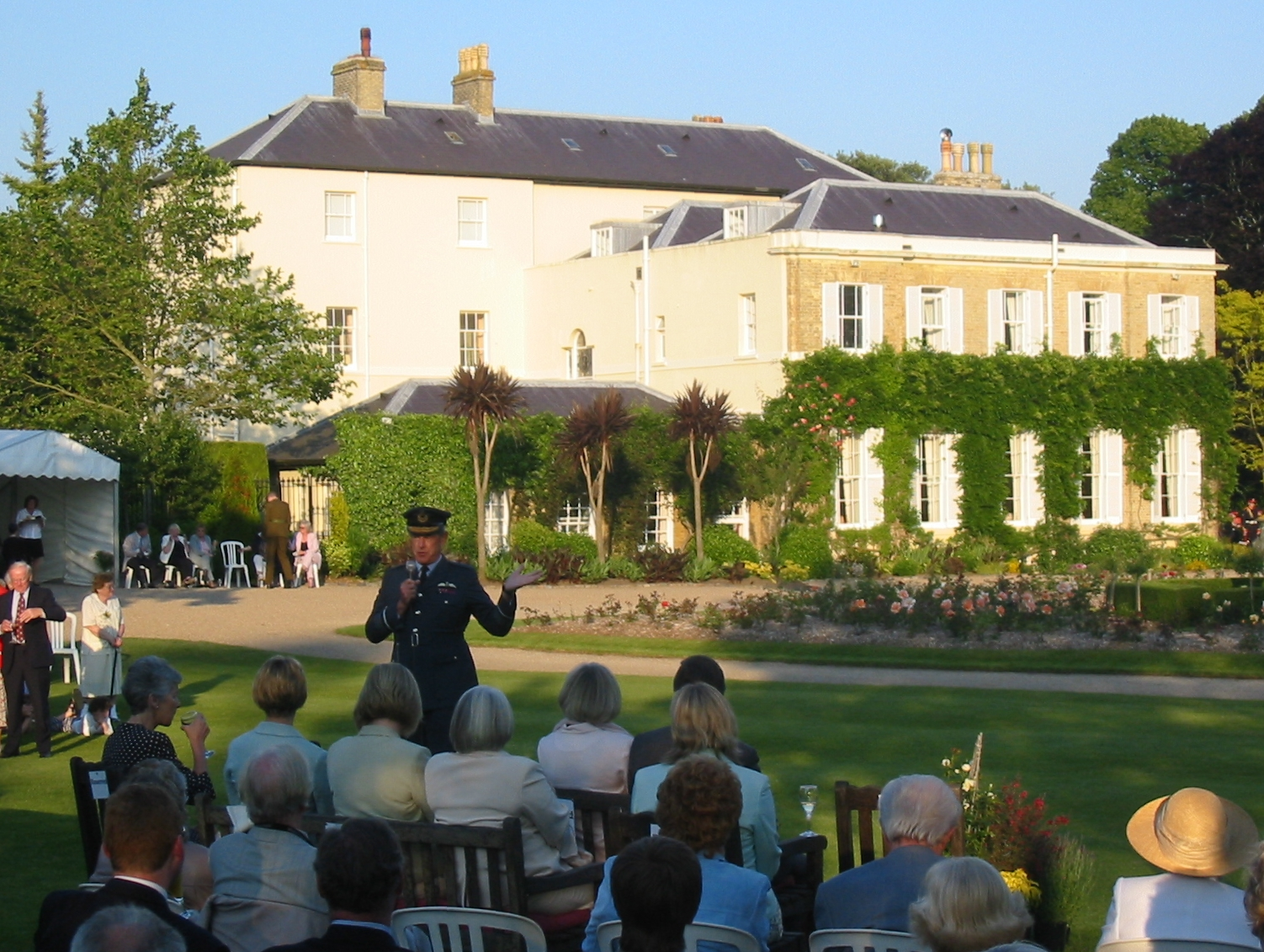
The public are invited to Government House in Jersey for the annual Queen's Birthday reception

Government House, St Saviour is the official residence of the Lieutenant Governor of Jersey (currently Lieutenant-General Sir Andrew Ridgway). It is also the official residence of the Duke of Normandy (currently King Charles III) as head of state when staying in Jersey.

=== Kenya ===
Government House is the former name of State House, which is the official residence of the President and First Lady of Kenya.

=== Mauritius ===
Le Réduit, the official residence of the former Governors and Governors-General of Mauritius, was also known as Government House from 1810 until 1992. Since then, it has been called State House and is the official residence of the President of Mauritius.

=== Montserrat ===
- Government House, Woodlands is the official residence of the Governor of Montserrat.

=== New Zealand ===
Government House, Wellington is the primary residence of the Governor-General of New Zealand. There is a second house in Auckland, Government House, Auckland.

Official Link: Governor-General of New Zealand

=== Nigeria ===
Government House, Port Harcourt is the official residence of the Governor of Rivers State.

=== Pakistan ===
- Government House of Balochistan in Quetta.
- Government House of Khyber Pakhtunkhwa in Peshawar.
- Government House of Punjab in Lahore.
- Government House of Sindh in Karachi.

=== Saint Helena ===
- Plantation House, is the official residence of the Governor of Saint Helena

=== Saint Kitts and Nevis ===
- Government House, Basseterre, Saint Kitts, is the official residence of the Governor-General of Saint Kitts and Nevis.

=== Saint Lucia ===
- Government House, Morne Fortune is the official residence of the Governor-General of Saint Lucia.

=== Sierra Leone ===
Government House is the former name of State House, the official residence of the President of Sierra Leone. The Governor of Sierra Leone lived there, as did the Governor-General of Sierra Leone.

=== Singapore ===
- Government House – Former residence of Sir Stamford Raffles and the Governors of Singapore at Government Hill, Singapore, demolished in 1859 and a replica of it currently stands on its former site.
- Government House of Singapore – Currently The Istana, the official residence of the President of Singapore. The Governor of the Straits Settlements lived there.
- Pavilion - Former Government House from 1859 - 1861.

=== Somaliland ===
The Presidential Palace, Somaliland in Hargeisa was formerly the residence of the Governor of British Somaliland from 1952 to 1960. It is now the residence of the President of Somaliland.

=== Trinidad and Tobago ===
- Government House is the former name of President's House, which is the official residence of the President of Trinidad and Tobago. The Governor of Trinidad and Tobago lived there, as did the Governor-General of Trinidad and Tobago.

=== Tuvalu ===
Government House, Tuvalu is the official residence of the Governor-General of Tuvalu.

=== Zambia ===
State House, Lusaka was the residence of the Governor of Northern Rhodesia until 1964, when Zambia became independent. The President of Zambia lives there.

== Government Houses outside the Commonwealth of Nations ==
=== Armenia ===
- Government House, Yerevan

=== Azerbaijan ===
Government House, Baku

- Government House, Baku, is a government building housing various state ministries of Azerbaijan. It is located on Neftchiler Avenue and faces the Baku Boulevard. From 1924 to 1927, construction of several large government buildings was planned and included in the budget of Baku. In 1934, the Soviet authorities announced a tender for the construction of the Baku Soviet Palace (later renamed the Government House).
- The Presidential Palace houses the executive administration of the President of Azerbaijan. The office is in charge of fulfilling the constitutional responsibilities of the President. The building is located on Istiglaliyyat Street of the capital city, Baku. Built in 1971, it was occupied by the Central Committee of the Communist Party of Azerbaijan. After the restoration of Azerbaijan's independence in 1991, the building was assigned to the President of Azerbaijan and his administration. It was renamed the Presidential Palace in 2003.

=== Bahrain ===
- Government House, Manama

=== Belarus ===
- Government House, Minsk

=== Hong Kong ===
- Government House, Hong Kong, is located on Government Hill, Central, on Hong Kong Island. It was the official residence of most of the Governors of Hong Kong during British administration. After 1997, its status as the official residence of the head of the Hong Kong Government was abolished and has been used as a place for mere ceremonial uses. However, when Sir Donald Tsang became the Chief executive of Hong Kong, he reverted it and designated the House as the official residence and office. He moved into the House at the end of January 2006.

=== Jerusalem ===
- Government House, also known as Armon HaNatziv (Palace of the Commissioner) in Hebrew, is the former headquarters of the government of the British Mandate of Palestine until 1948, and has since June 1948 been the headquarters of the United Nations Truce Supervision Organization. The building is the namesake of the Armon HaNatziv neighborhood, also called East Talpiot.

=== Moldova ===
- Government House, Chișinău

=== Thailand ===
- Government House of Thailand – Not an official residence, but the headquarters of the Office of the Prime Minister of Thailand.

=== Ukraine ===
- Government House, Lviv, Ukraine – formerly the seat of the Kingdom of Galicia and Lodomeria, a province of the Austro-Hungarian Empire

=== United States ===
Some gubernatorial residences in the United States of America are also named Government House:

- Government House (St. Augustine), listed on the NRHP in Florida
- Government House (Maryland)
- Government House (New York City), intended to be the official residence for President George Washington, demolished in 1815
- Government House (American Samoa), a National Historic Landmark

=== Zimbabwe ===
- Government House, Harare, (now called State House) the official residence of the President of Zimbabwe. Prior to independence in 1980, Government House was the residence of the Governor of Southern Rhodesia, the Governor-General of Rhodesia and Nyasaland, the President of Rhodesia, and the President of Zimbabwe Rhodesia.
- Government House, Bulawayo, (now also called State House) the official residence in Bulawayo

== See also ==
- Government Houses of the British Empire and Commonwealth
- Government Palace
- Governor's Mansion (disambiguation)
- Presidential Palace
- Official residence
