= Government Palace =

Government Palace may refer to:

- Tucumán Government Palace, Argentina
- Government Palace, Dili, East Timor
- Government Palace (Finland)
- Government Palace of Chihuahua, Mexico
- Government Palace (Mongolia)
- Government Palace (Peru)

== See also ==
- Government House
- Presidential Palace
