= Portuguese Governor's Mansion =

- Location: Pondicherry

The Portuguese Governor's Mansion in Pondicherry, India is a historic building.
