= Governor's House, Lahore =

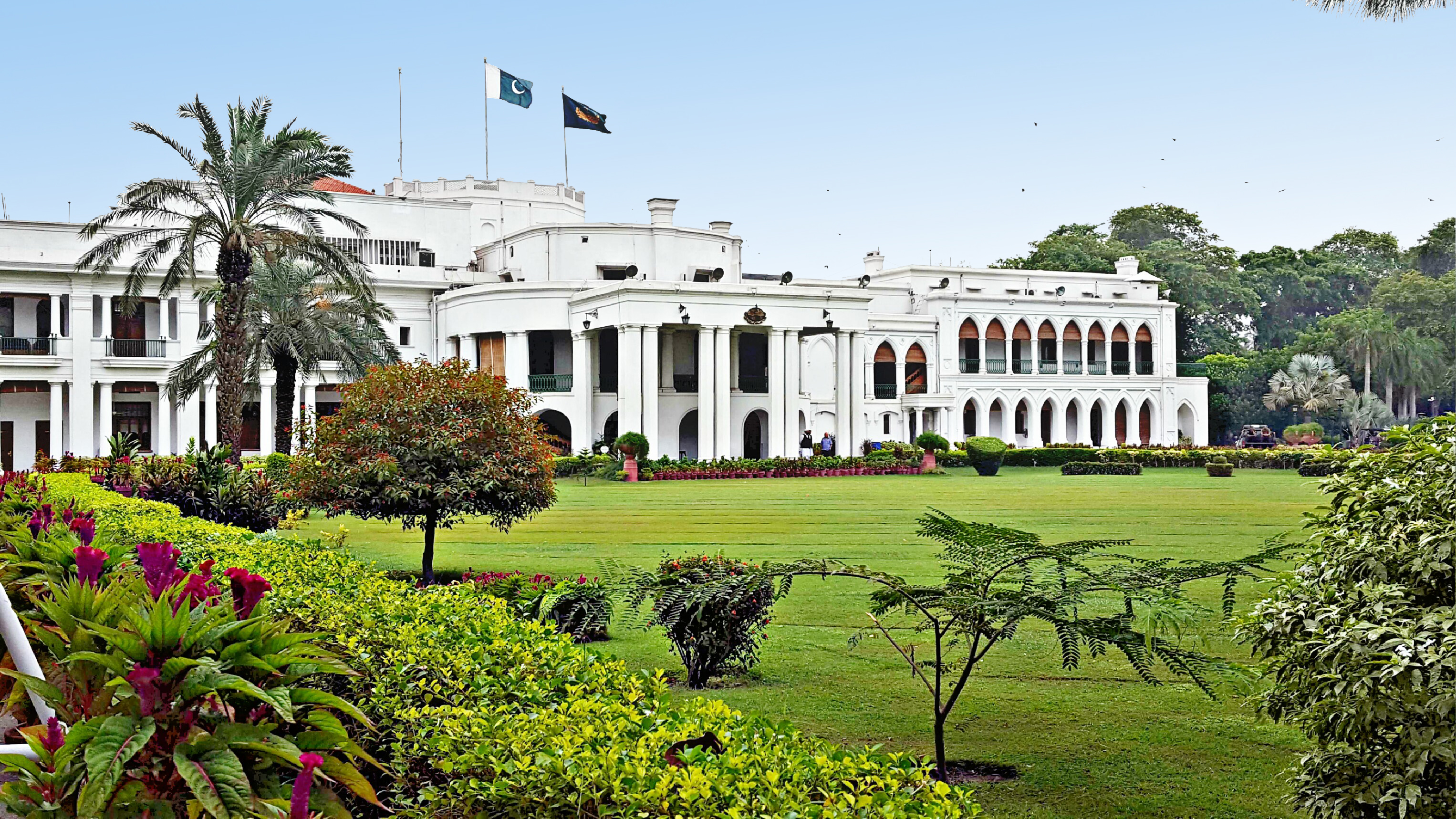
- Alternative names: Punjab Governor House

General information
- Coordinates: 31°33′24″N 74°20′08″E
- Owner: Government of Punjab, Pakistan

Website
- governorhouse.punjab.gov.pk

The Governor's House (Urdu: ایوان گورنر, Punjabi: ایوان گورنر,) is the official residence of the governor of Punjab (Pakistan) located in Lahore, Punjab, Pakistan. It is spread over 36 ha (90 acres). The current governor of Punjab is Sardar Saleem Haider Khan.

== Location and area ==
The Governor's House is located along the Mall Road in Lahore, the capital and political center of Punjab province. The main entrance is on the T-junction of Mall Road and Sharah-e-Aiwan-e-Sanat-o-Tijarat. Although a separate walled complex, it sits adjacent to the Staff College on one side and Al-Hamra Arts Council on the other. The building sits near the Lahore Zoo, Mayo Gardens, Pearl-Continental Hotels & Resorts, Avari Hotels, Bagh-e-Jinnah, Aitchison College, Qurban Lines (Police) and the Children's Library Complex.

== History ==
The Governor's House in Lahore, Punjab, Pakistan is the official residence of the Governor of Punjab (Pakistan). It is spread over 35.4 ha (87 acres). The current governor of Punjab is Sardar Saleem Haider Khan.

The residence is a typical mansion built among a large expanse of surrounding lawns and gardens. Under the house, there is a tomb belonging to a man by the name of Muhammad Qasim Khan, who is said to be a maternal cousin of the Mughal emperor Akbar. Four doorways enclose the two-story tomb and to the north, there is a stairway which leads up. Much of the furniture and artifacts used in the house are antique relics that date back.

After the annexation of the Punjab from the Sikh Empire, the building and the land around it was purchased for a paltry sum of Rs. 2,500 and utilized as a residence for the British Lieutenant-Governor of the Province. Following the independence of Pakistan in 1947, it was formally designated for the use of the province's governors.

The Governor's House has evolved over the years in terms of architect due to altered political scenarios, different events and requirements. During the British Raj it was the residence for the British lieutenant-Governor of the province and since independence of Pakistan in 1947 it was formally designated for the use of the province's governors. Governor House has various styles of architecture. Different portions were added to the house from time to time which goes back to many generations, reflecting the legacy of early periods. There are pieces of furniture of olden days are still in use. The residence is a mansion built among a large expanse of surrounding lawns and gardens.

== See also ==
- Governor's House (Karachi)
- Governor's House (Peshawar)
- Governor's House (Quetta)
