= Zimbabwe House, Harare =

Former residence of the Prime Minister of Zimbabwe and Prime Minister of Rhodesia

Zimbabwe House
- Former names: Independence House; Dzimbahwe

General information
- Type: Official residence
- Location: 8 Chancellor Avenue, Harare, Zimbabwe
- Owner: Republic of Zimbabwe

Zimbabwe House, formerly called Independence House and Dzimbahwe, is an official residence of the President of Zimbabwe in Harare, Zimbabwe. It was built in 1910 as was used as the house of the Prime Minister of Southern Rhodesia, Prime Minister of Rhodesia, Prime Minister of Zimbabwe Rhodesia and Prime Minister of Zimbabwe.

== Rhodesian history ==
For most of its existence under Southern Rhodesian administration as home of the Prime Minister of Southern Rhodesia, the building had no official name beyond its address of 8 Chancellor Avenue. It is located opposite Government House where the Governor of Southern Rhodesia resided. The building was renamed "Independence House" following Rhodesia's Unilateral Declaration of Independence and continued to be used as the residency of the Prime Minister of Rhodesia, Ian Smith.

Following Rhodesia's unrecognised reconstitution as Zimbabwe Rhodesia, Independence House was renamed Dzimbahwe (Shona: House of Chiefs) for the Prime Minister of Zimbabwe Rhodesia, Bishop Abel Muzorewa. The house was almost subjected to a rocket attack by ZANU militants in July 1979 after the house of the local Archbishop of the Greek Orthodox Church of Alexandria was fired at. The British South Africa Police believed they attacked the Archbishop's house by mistake and were actually targeting either Bishop Muzorewa at Dzimbahwe or the house of the head of the Rhodesian Army, General Peter Walls.

== Zimbabwe history ==
Following the establishment of Zimbabwe, it was used as the house of the Prime Minister of Zimbabwe, Robert Mugabe and renamed "Zimbabwe House". In 1982, the house was attacked by Zimbabwe National Army deserters who shot at it with automatic weaponry and RPGs in an attempt to assassinate Mugabe. As a result, Mugabe instituted a 6pm curfew on all foot and vehicle traffic on Chancellor Avenue which was not removed until 2017. He also increased security by erecting a barbed wire fence manned by armed guards around the property. In 2009, the office of Prime Minister was re-established and the now President Mugabe, offered Zimbabwe House as an official residence to Morgan Tsvangirai but he declined it. Tsvangirai cited the dilapidated state of Zimbabwe House and that he wanted to move his official residence away from being so close to Mugabe.
