= Belmond Governor's Residence =

Coordinates: 16°46′10.56″N 96°9′45.31″E

The Governor's Residence is a Victorian-style hotel located in Dagon Township, Yangon, Myanmar (Burma), located in a teak mansion from the 1920s. It is located in the Embassy Quarter near the Shwedagon Pagoda, the National Museum, the former Foreign Ministry office compound and India House - now the official residence of the ambassador of India.

The famed British Gentlemen's Club, the Pegu Club was located nearby.

== History ==
The elegant teak mansion was built in 1920. The two-story mansion, as its official name denotes, served as the official home of the governors of the British Crown Colony of Burma, such as Sir Reginald Dorman-Smith and Hubert Rance. In 2006 the hotel became part of Orient-Express Hotels Ltd. which in 2014 changed its name to Belmond Ltd. At this point the hotel changed its name to Belmond Governor's Residence.

Operations under Memories Group

After operations halted in 2021 due to the covid-19 pandemic and the following political changes in Myanmar, the Governor's Residence reopened under Memories Group - a leading Myanmar lifestyle and tourism brand - in late 2023. The property now operates under the moniker of Governor's Residence and continues offering unique dining, accommodation, and lifestyle services.

== See also ==
- Government House, Rangoon
