= Governor of Southern Rhodesia =

British monarch's representative, 1923–1980

- Flag of the governor from 1952 to 1980

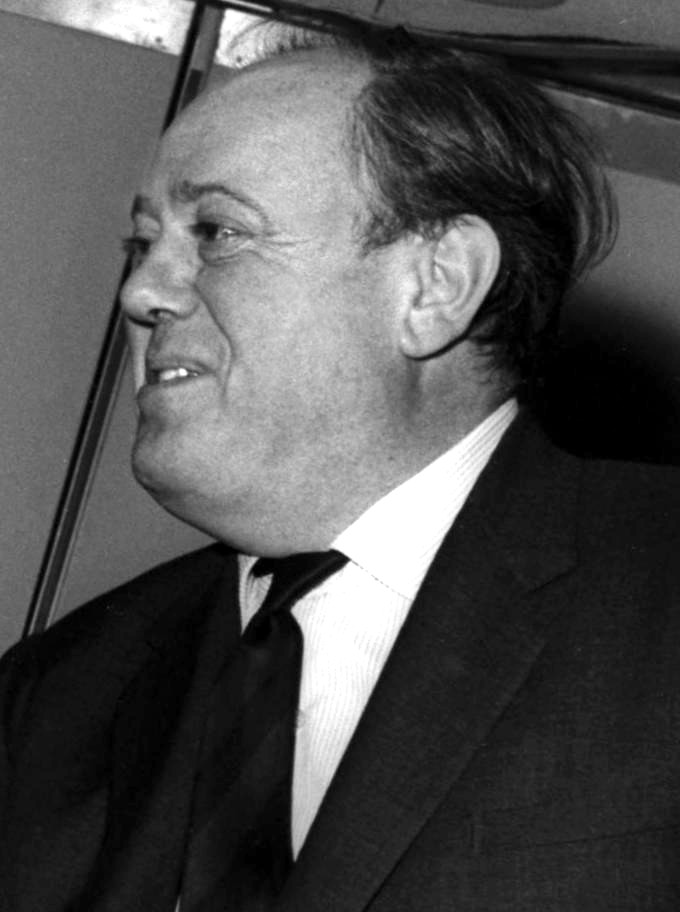
- Last in office The Lord Soames; 11 December 1979 – 18 April 1980
- Style: His Excellency The Right Honourable
- Residence: Government House, Salisbury (now Harare)
- Appointer: Monarch of the United Kingdom
- Formation: 1 October 1923
- First holder: Sir John Chancellor
- Final holder: Christopher Soames
- Abolished: 18 April 1980

The governor of Southern Rhodesia was the representative of the British monarch in the self-governing colony of Southern Rhodesia from 1923 to 1980. The governor was appointed by the Crown and acted as the local head of state, receiving instructions from the British government.

Rhodesia's 1965 Unilateral Declaration of Independence resulted in the Rhodesian government ceasing to recognise the authority of the governor, and the 1969 Rhodesian constitutional referendum resulted in Rhodesia declaring itself a republic, independent from the British monarchy. Britain still considered the territory its colony and continued to maintain the office, albeit allowing it be vacant from 1969–1979. Following the Lancaster House Agreement the office was filled from December 1979 until April 1980 whereupon Britain formally recognised the territory as the independent republic of Zimbabwe, and the office of governor was thereafter abolished.

== Constitutional role ==
The governor was also commander-in-chief of the armed forces and as such, in theory at least, exercised considerable influence over the running of the colony and its government, but in practice, the governor's main function was to maintain a satisfactory relationship between the British and Southern Rhodesian Governments and acted in an advisory capacity most of the time. From 1951, however, in contrast to other colonies, the British government was represented in Southern Rhodesia by a High Commissioner in Salisbury (now Harare).

When Southern Rhodesia was part of the Federation of Rhodesia and Nyasaland, the position of the governor remained unchanged, but as Salisbury became the capital of the Federation, the governor general resided at Government House, previously the governor's official residence. During this time, the governor of Southern Rhodesia resided at Governor's Lodge in the suburb of Highlands.

== UDI ==
Following the Unilateral Declaration of Independence in 1965, the government of Ian Smith ceased to recognise the authority of the then governor, Sir Humphrey Gibbs, and appointed Clifford Dupont to exercise the governor's powers as Officer Administering the Government.

However, Gibbs continued to occupy Government House, asserting his position as the Queen's de jure representative, and did not resign from the post until June 1969, following the decision of white voters in a referendum to approve a new constitution declaring Rhodesia, as Southern Rhodesia had become more commonly known, a republic.

In 1977, Field Marshal Michael Carver was designated Resident Commissioner for Rhodesia, but he resigned fourteen months later.

The office of governor remained vacant until 11 December 1979, when Lord Soames assumed the post, following the signing of the Lancaster House Agreement, under which Southern Rhodesia would achieve de jure independence as Zimbabwe on 18 April 1980.

== Flag ==
Flag of the governor of Southern Rhodesia (1924–1951)

Flag of the governor of Southern Rhodesia (1951–1952), featuring the Tudor Crown.

Flag of the governor of Southern Rhodesia (1952–1980), featuring St Edward's Crown.

In common with most other British colonies, the flag used by the governor, as the Sovereign's representative in Southern Rhodesia, was initially a Union Flag with a white roundel in the centre, charged with the shield from the colony's arms granted on 11 August 1924. Unique among the flags of the governors of British colonies, this shield of Arms was not surrounded by the customary wreath. This flag was adopted on 1 October 1924 and was flown until 30 July 1951.

On 31 July 1951, a new flag was put into use for the governor of Southern Rhodesia. This was dark blue and charged in the centre with a Royal Crown, its height being four-sevenths of the hoist. Initially the Tudor Crown would have been used, but after her accession to the throne in 1952, Elizabeth II indicated her preference for St Edward's Crown, and this version would have been used thereafter. Although the colony had attained 'Responsible Government' in 1923, it was never a fully fledged Dominion, and so did not have a governor-general, whose flag in other Dominions would be dark blue, charged in the centre with the Royal Crest above a Crown, with the name of the Dominion written in a yellow scroll below.

== List of governors of Southern Rhodesia ==
No.	Portrait	Name (Birth–Death)	Term of office			Monarch	Prime Minister
No.	Portrait	Name (Birth–Death)	Took office	Left office	Time in office	Monarch	Prime Minister
1		Sir John Chancellor (1870–1952)	1 October 1923	15 June 1928	4 years, 258 days	George V	Coghlan; Moffat
–		Sir Murray Bisset (1876–1931); Acting	15 June 1928	24 November 1928	162 days	George V	Moffat
2		Sir Cecil Hunter-Rodwell (1874–1953)	24 November 1928	1 May 1934	5 years, 158 days	George V	Moffat; Mitchell; Huggins
–		Fraser Russell (1876–1952); Acting	1 May 1934	8 January 1935	252 days	George V	Huggins
3		Sir Herbert Stanley (1872–1955)	8 January 1935	8 January 1942	7 years	George V Edward VIII; George VI	Huggins
–		Fraser Russell (1876–1952); Acting	8 January 1942	10 December 1942	336 days	George VI	Huggins
4		Sir Evelyn Baring (1903–1973)	10 December 1942	26 October 1944	1 year, 321 days	George VI	Huggins
–		Sir Robert James Hudson (1885–1963); Acting	26 October 1944	20 February 1945	117 days	George VI	Huggins
5		Sir Campbell Tait (1886–1946) (Note: Admiral Tait's health rapidly declined shortly after he arrived in Southern Rhodesia. He relinquished the governorship after only a year, and died five months later at Government House in Salisbury.)	20 February 1945	2 February 1946	347 days	George VI	Huggins
–		Sir Fraser Russell (1876–1952); Acting (Note: Russell had been appointed a KBE in the 1943 New Year Honours, announced in December 1942.)	2 February 1946	19 July 1946	167 days	George VI	Huggins
–		Sir Robert James Hudson (1885–1963); Acting	19 July 1946	14 January 1947	179 days	George VI	Huggins
6		Sir John Noble Kennedy (1893–1970)	14 January 1947	21 November 1953	6 years, 311 days	George VI; Elizabeth II	Huggins; Todd
–		Sir Robert Tredgold (1899–1977); Acting	21 November 1953	26 November 1954	1 year, 5 days	Elizabeth II	Todd
7		Sir Peveril William-Powlett (1898–1985)	26 November 1954	28 December 1959	5 years, 32 days	Elizabeth II	Todd; Whitehead
8		Sir Humphrey Gibbs (1902–1990) (Note: Gibbs' position was not recognised by the Smith's government after the UDI on 11 November 1965.)	28 December 1959	24 June 1969	9 years, 178 days	Elizabeth II	Whitehead; Field; Smith
Position vacant (24 June 1969 – 11 December 1979) (Note: Field Marshal Michael Carver was named as Resident Commissioner-designate on 1 September 1977.)						Elizabeth II	
9		Christopher Soames, Baron Soames (1920–1987)	11 December 1979	18 April 1980	129 days	Elizabeth II	Position abolished

For continuation after independence, see: President of Zimbabwe

=== Officer Administering the Government ===
No.	Administrator	Term of office		Party	Previous office	Ref.
1	Clifford Dupont; GCLM ID (1905–1978)	17 November 1965	2 March 1970	Rhodesian Front (RF)	Deputy Prime Minister of Rhodesia (1964–1965)	—N/a

== See also ==
- President of Rhodesia
- Prime Minister of Rhodesia
- President of Zimbabwe
- Prime Minister of Zimbabwe
- Governor-General of the Federation of Rhodesia and Nyasaland
