= Governor's House, Peshawar =

Governor's House
- د والي ماڼۍ
- Alternative names: Khyber Pakhtunkhwa Governor House

General information
- Coordinates: 34°00′33″N 71°33′23″E
- Owner: Government of Khyber Pakhtunkhwa

The Governor's House is a palace in Peshawar, Khyber Pakhtunkhwa, Pakistan. It serves as the official residence of the governor of Khyber Pakhtunkhwa. It has a secret tunnel from the left side mosque to the Bala Hisar Fort it is about 1.25 km long, amidst what is now a park. It is close to the Peshawar Museum.

The Governor House was commissioned in the early 20th century by the British. The famous British era contractor responsible for the Mardan-Chitral Road (Lowari Pass), Attock Landi Kotal Rail track and Drosh Fort, Khan Bahadur Nawab Abdul Hameed Khan of Badrashi was contracted to build the building in a traditional Greco-Roman design prevalent in other grand British buildings across India.

== See also ==
- Governor's House, Karachi
- Governor's House, Lahore
- Governor's House, Quetta
