= Prime Minister of Rhodesia =

Head of government from 1923 to 1979

- Flag of the prime minister of Rhodesia (1970–1979)
- Style: The Right Honourable
- Member of: Cabinet of Rhodesia (1965–1979)
- Residence: Independence House, Salisbury (now Harare)
- Appointer: Governor of Southern Rhodesia (1923–1970); President of Rhodesia (1970–1979)
- Formation: 1 October 1923
- First holder: Charles Coghlan
- Final holder: Ian Smith
- Abolished: 1 June 1979
- Superseded by: Prime Minister of Zimbabwe Rhodesia
- Deputy: Deputy Prime Minister of Rhodesia

The prime minister of Rhodesia (Southern Rhodesia before 1964) was the head of government of Rhodesia. Rhodesia, which had become a self-governing colony of the United Kingdom in 1923, unilaterally declared independence on 11 November 1965, and was thereafter an unrecognized state until 1979. In December 1979, the country came under temporary British control, and in April 1980 the country gained recognized independence as Zimbabwe.

Rhodesia's political system was modelled on the Westminster system, and the role of the prime minister was similar to that of countries with similar constitutional histories – for example, Australia and Canada.

== History ==
The British self-governing colony of Southern Rhodesia—simply Rhodesia from October 1964—was created on 1 October 1923, from land previously governed by the British South Africa Company. The British government annexed the land, and granted the new crown colony responsible government in the same year.

From 1953 to 1963, Northern Rhodesia, Southern Rhodesia and Nyasaland—equivalent to today's Zambia, Zimbabwe and Malawi, respectively—were joined in the Federation of Rhodesia and Nyasaland, also known as the Central African Federation. Godfrey Huggins served as Federal Prime Minister from 1953 to 1956, then Roy Welensky held the post until the end of Federation on 31 December 1963. When Northern Rhodesia gained independence as Zambia on 24 October 1964, Southern Rhodesia began to refer to itself simply as "Rhodesia".

Prime Minister Ian Smith's government issued a Unilateral Declaration of Independence from Britain in 1965, and he remained prime minister when the country was declared a republic in 1970. Under the Internal Settlement in 1979, after a long period of conflict, the country became known as Zimbabwe Rhodesia, with Abel Muzorewa as its first black prime minister.

None of these acts were recognised internationally, and under the Lancaster House Agreement the country's government agreed to revert to colonial status in 1979 to facilitate the introduction of majority rule and the creation of the independent state of Zimbabwe in 1980.

The office of Prime Minister of Zimbabwe was abolished in 1987, when Robert Mugabe became executive president. However, in 2009, it was restored through political negotiations, resulting in Morgan Tsvangirai becoming the first prime minister of the country in over 21 years.

== List of prime ministers of Rhodesia ==
Parties

Rhodesia Party
Reform Party
United Party / United Rhodesia Party / United Federal Party (Note: The United Party, formed in 1934, renamed itself the United Rhodesia Party in 1953, when the Federation of Rhodesia and Nyasaland was created. In 1957, it merged with the Federal Party to become the United Federal Party. It should not be confused with the rump United Rhodesia Party led by former prime minister Garfield Todd, which fought the 1958 general election, then promptly dissolved.)
Rhodesian Front

No.	Portrait	Name (Birth–Death) Constituency	Term of office			Elected (Parliament)	Political party
No.	Portrait	Name (Birth–Death) Constituency	Took office	Left office	Time in office	Elected (Parliament)	Political party
1		Charles Coghlan (1863–1927); MP for Bulawayo North	1 October 1923	28 August 1927	3 years, 331 days	1924 (1st)	Rhodesia Party
1		Charles Coghlan (1863–1927); MP for Bulawayo North	Introduction of responsible government, after the 1922 referendum. Formation of Southern Rhodesia. Oversaw the government's purchase of the country from the British South Africa Company for £2.3 million. Opposed amalgamation with either Northern Rhodesia or the Union of South Africa. Died in office.				
2		Howard Moffat (1869–1951); MP for Gwanda	2 September 1927	5 July 1933	5 years, 306 days	— (1st); 1928 (2nd)	Rhodesia Party
2		Howard Moffat (1869–1951); MP for Gwanda	Viewed as a conservative, who believed that Rhodesia would eventually join the Union of South Africa. He oversaw the purchase, for £2 million, of the British South Africa Company's remaining mineral rights in Southern Rhodesia. His government passed the 1930 Land Apportionment Act, which defined the pattern of land allocation and ownership and is viewed as being one of the ultimate causes of the land disputes in Zimbabwe from 2000. Resigned.				
3		George Mitchell (1867–1937); MP for Gwanda	5 July 1933	12 September 1933	69 days	— (2nd)	Rhodesia Party
3		George Mitchell (1867–1937); MP for Gwanda	Changed the title from Premier to Prime Minister. Shortest serving Prime Minister of Southern Rhodesia. Lost the 1933 general election to Reform Party.				
		Godfrey Huggins (1883–1971); MP for Salisbury North	12 September 1933	7 September 1953	19 years, 360 days	1933 (3rd); 1934 (4th); 1939 (5th); 1946 (6th); 1948 (7th)	Reform Party (until 1934); United Party (from 1934)
4		Godfrey Huggins (1883–1971); MP for Salisbury North	12 September 1933	7 September 1953	19 years, 360 days	1933 (3rd); 1934 (4th); 1939 (5th); 1946 (6th); 1948 (7th)	Reform Party (until 1934); United Party (from 1934)
4		Godfrey Huggins (1883–1971); MP for Salisbury North	Longest serving Prime Minister of Southern Rhodesia. Created coalition with Rhodesia Party to form the United Party. World War II. Became an advocate of federating Southern Rhodesia with some of the neighbouring British colonies in the region so that they would become an independent state within the British Empire while maintaining white minority rule with only a small number of educated blacks qualifying for the vote in addition to most whites. As a result of his effort the Federation of Rhodesia and Nyasaland was created in 1953 uniting Northern Rhodesia, Southern Rhodesia and Nyasaland. Resigned to become the first Prime Minister of the Federation.				
5		Garfield Todd (1908–2002); MP for Shabani	7 September 1953	17 February 1958	4 years, 163 days	— (7th); 1954 (8th)	United Rhodesia Party
5		Garfield Todd (1908–2002); MP for Shabani	Introduced modest reforms aimed at improving the education of the Black majority. Also introduced the appellation "Mr" for Blacks instead of "AM" an appellation derived from their patois language. Under influence from large alcohol distributors, his government ended prohibition under which black population were unable to buy and sell alcohol in their designated areas. In a major breakthrough, Todd pushed a bill allowing for multiracial trade unions, thereby undercutting the growing white nationalist influence in the unions. Lastly, in a bid to increase the number of Blacks eligible to vote from 2% to 16% of the electorate, he lowered property and education qualifications, but this was soundly rejected. These reforms were seen as dangerously radical by most whites, and he was forced to resign.				
6		Edgar Whitehead (1905–1971); MP for Salisbury North	17 February 1958	17 December 1962	4 years, 303 days	— (8th); 1958 (9th)	United Federal Party
6		Edgar Whitehead (1905–1971); MP for Salisbury North	Oversaw continued rapid economic growth but also the beginnings of the dismantling of the Federation of Rhodesia and Nyasaland against the wishes of his party. He was crucial in the negotiation of the 1961 constitution, which increased black representation in the Southern Rhodesian parliament. He relaxed racial discrimination laws and attempted to enroll black voters, but this was done against a background of civil unrest and a tightening of security measures. The policies of his government caused alarm among the white population, while the blacks remained dissatisfied with the advances they had made. Lost the 1962 general election to Rhodesian Front.				
7		Winston Field (1904–1969); MP for Marandellas	17 December 1962	13 April 1964	1 year, 118 days	1962 (10th)	Rhodesian Front
7		Winston Field (1904–1969); MP for Marandellas	Dissolution of the Federation of Rhodesia and Nyasaland; his government won the majority of the Federation's military and other assets for Southern Rhodesia. Forced to resign after his failure to win independence from the United Kingdom.				
8		Ian Smith (1919–2007); MP for Umzingwane	13 April 1964	1 June 1979	15 years, 49 days	— (10th); 1965 (11th); 1970 (12th); 1974 (13th); 1977 (14th)	Rhodesian Front
8		Ian Smith (1919–2007); MP for Umzingwane	His government issued the Unilateral Declaration of Independence (UDI) from the United Kingdom on 11 November 1965, causing widespread international condemnation and the first instance of economic sanctions in the history of the United Nations, led by Britain and the Organization of African Unity. Enjoyed limited support of South Africa and Portugal. Declared Rhodesia to be a republic on 2 March 1970, after the 1969 referendum. The Rhodesian Bush War started in 1964, and escalated into a full-scale conflict after 1972. Rhodesia's isolation intensified once Mozambique became independent from Portuguese rule in 1975, and when South Africa started to scale back its support. Under mounting isolation and international pressure, Smith conceded to a form of majority rule in 1978, by signing the Internal Settlement with moderate black nationalist leader Abel Muzorewa (this act was unrecognized by the international community and by main black nationalist groups). As part of this settlement, the 1979 referendum and the general election were held, the first multi-racial parliamentary elections (but with separate black and white rolls). Following the election, Rhodesia was renamed Zimbabwe Rhodesia and Muzorewa succeeded Smith as Prime Minister.				

== See also ==
- Governor of Southern Rhodesia
- President of Rhodesia
- Prime Minister of Zimbabwe Rhodesia
- Prime Minister of Zimbabwe
