= Australia–Zimbabwe relations =

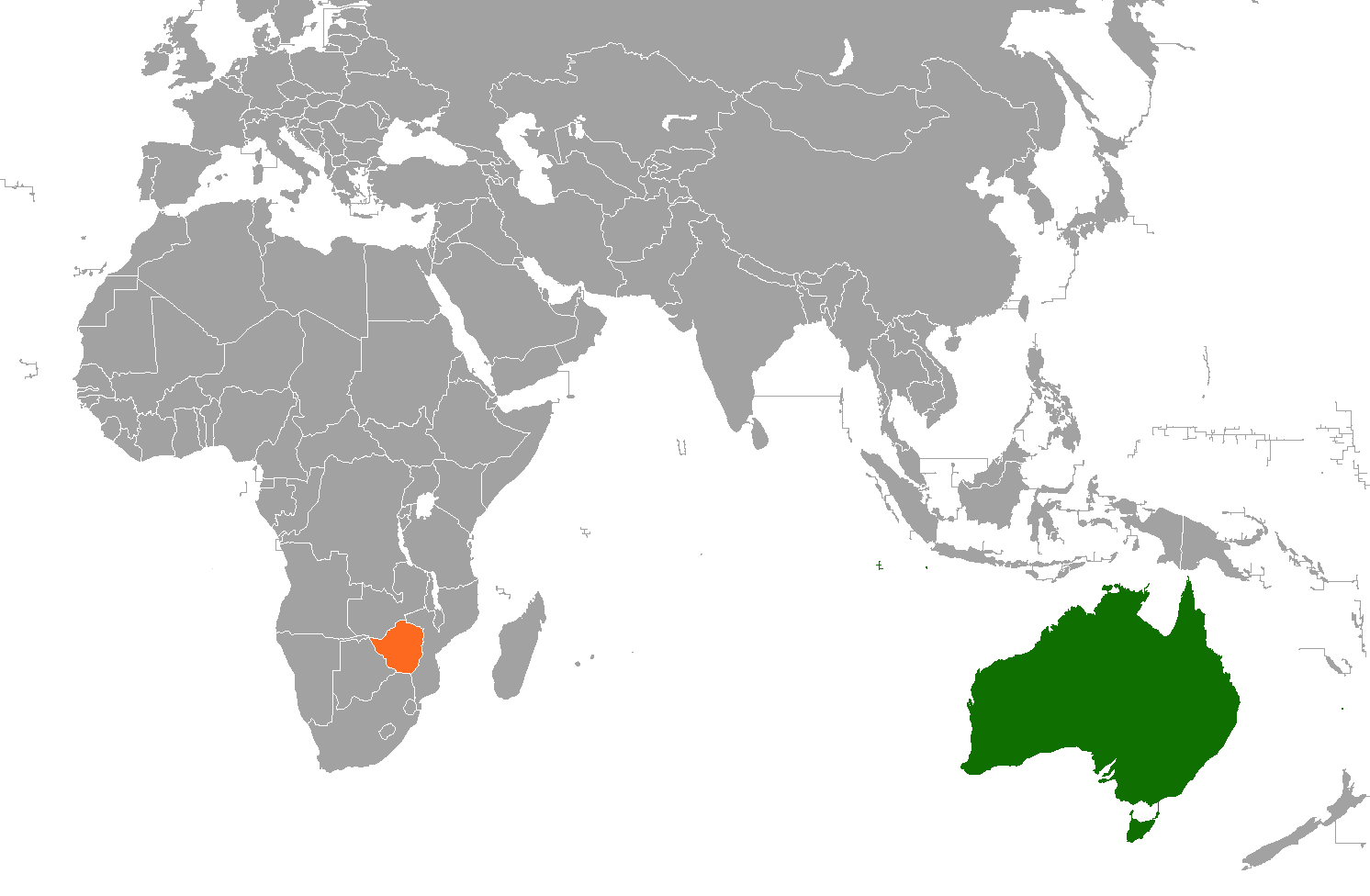

- Australia: Zimbabwe

Diplomatic mission
- Embassy of Australia, Harare: Embassy of Zimbabwe, Canberra

Envoy
- Ambassador Bronte Moules: Ambassador Joe Tapera Mhishi

Foreign relations exist between Australia and Zimbabwe. Both countries have full embassy level diplomatic relations. Australia maintains an embassy in Harare, and Zimbabwe maintains an embassy in Canberra.

== History ==
=== Australia–Southern Rhodesia relations ===
Australia–Southern Rhodesia relations
- Australia: Southern Rhodesia

=== Australia–Rhodesia relations ===
Australia–Rhodesia relations
- Australia: Rhodesia

Australia–Republic of Rhodesia relations
- Australia: Rhodesia

The nations of Australia and Zimbabwe both have their origins in colonies established by the British as part of their empire in the Georgian and Victorian eras. While Australia experienced significant amounts of white immigration from Europe (beginning in the 19th century), Zimbabwe was only settled by Europeans in the 1890's and the white population of Zimbabwe always remained a minority. The colony of Southern Rhodesia was granted self-governing status in 1923, but was not granted dominion status, unlike Australia or South Africa. Australia had a limited early trading relationship with Rhodesia, with a small Trade Office established in Salisbury in 1954, and in 1955 Australia signed a trade agreement with the Federation of Rhodesia and Nyasaland. In 1964-65, the last year prior to the Rhodesian unilateral declaration of independence, Rhodesian exports to Australia were valued at £1.2 million, comprising mostly tobacco (74%), and ferroalloys (14%); while Australian exports to Rhodesia were valued at £2 million, comprising mostly wheat (50%) and tallow (10%).

The colony of Rhodesia eventually broke away from the British Empire in 1965, with the white-minority government of Ian Smith issuing a Unilateral Declaration of Independence as the state of Rhodesia. This new state of Rhodesia, despite gaining unofficial support from apartheid South Africa and Estado Novo Portugal (until 1974), failed to gain any international recognition and became increasingly isolated. The Australian government of Robert Menzies did not officially recognise the declaration, noting "there can be no diplomatic recognition by the Australian Government of a government so formed." Despite this, several backbench government MPs visited Rhodesia in a private capacity following the UDI (Dr Wylie Gibbs, James Killen, Ian Pettitt and Wilfrid Kent Hughes in 1967 and David Connolly in 1976).

Despite the federal government's decision to not formally recognise Smith's regime, prior to the election of the Whitlam government in 1972, Australia was one of the few countries to provide Rhodesia with diplomatic support. This was motivated by some groups of the population being sympathetic towards white Rhodesians. The Australian Government's support included issuing several Rhodesian diplomats with Australian passports during 1967 and 1968 and tolerating the Rhodesia Information Centre, the Rhodesian Government's unofficial diplomatic mission in Australia. Australia also abstained during some votes on United Nations measures that targeted Rhodesia. The Rhodesia Information Centre and Rhodesia-Australia Association were the main organisations that advocated in support of the white Rhodesian regime in Australia, but media coverage of the Rhodesian Government was almost entirely negative.

In 1966, the Rhodesian Government established an office of the Rhodesian Information Service in Melbourne, before moving in 1967 to Sydney at 9 Myrtle Street, Crows Nest. However from 1972, following a change in government, the Australian federal Labor government of Gough Whitlam in Canberra sought to close the office. In 1973, the federal government attempted to cut post and telephone links to the Centre, but this was ruled illegal by the full bench of the High Court (Bradley v. The Commonwealth (1973) 128 CLR 557). Later in 1973, the NSW Corporate Affairs Commission attempted to cancel the registration of the Rhodesia Information Centre on the basis that its name implied official connection to the unrecognised Rhodesian government, and on 12 June 1974 the NSW Court of Appeal upheld this decision, which resulted in the office officially registering as the "Flame Lily Centre", although was still generally referred to as the Rhodesian Information Service. The office remained open despite further efforts to close it under the succeeding government of Malcolm Fraser. It was closed by the Zimbabwean Government in May 1980.

During the Commonwealth Heads of Government Meeting 1979 held in Lusaka, Zambia, Australian Prime Minister Malcolm Fraser was instrumental in convincing the then British Prime Minister Margaret Thatcher to withhold British recognition of the government of Zimbabwe-Rhodesia, prompting Britain to host the Lancaster House Agreement at which full independence and majority rule for Zimbabwe was agreed upon. During the implementation period of the Lancaster House Agreement and ceasefire, Australia maintained the second largest official presence in Rhodesia, after Britain. On 21 December 1979, Australia lifted its economic sanctions on Rhodesia, and contributed a contingent of 152 Australian soldiers (under the command of Colonel Kevin Cole) to the 1300-person Commonwealth Ceasefire Monitoring Force (alongside the United Kingdom, Fiji, Kenya and New Zealand), which was present in the country from 23 December 1979 to 5 March 1980.

An Australian Liaison Office (headed by career diplomat Charles Mott as the Special Representative) was established in Salisbury on 23 December 1979 to "assist the Ceasefire Monitoring Contingent and election observers with political support and advice, and to serve as a direct point of contact between the Australian Government and the British Authorities in Salisbury." Senior Australian diplomat, Mick Shann, was appointed to the Commonwealth team observing the 1980 Southern Rhodesian general election, and Australia also sent a national observer group for the election held in February 1980. In its report of 11 March 1980 the group noted that "freedom and fairness in elections are not absolute" and concluded "that in all the circumstances the 1980 Rhodesian elections achieved a sufficiently high level on the scale (of freedom and fairness) to be described as free and fair".

In recognition of Fraser's contribution to Zimbabwean independence, the new Zimbabwean Prime Minister, Robert Mugabe, invited Fraser to attend Zimbabwe's independence celebrations in Salisbury on 17–18 April 1980. Fraser met with Mugabe on 18 April, announcing $5 million of assistance to the new country, and noted: "There have been times when peace in Zimbabwe has seemed an unattainable goal. However, it is now a reality which will permit the energies of the people of this country to be directed towards a better life for everyone, with opportunities for all. Australia wishes Mr Mugabe every success in the difficult task ahead of him."

=== Relations since 1980 ===
Australia established a High Commission in Salisbury on independence in 1980 by upgrading the existing Liaison Office, with Jeremy Hearder as the first High Commissioner. Zimbabwe established a High Commission in Canberra in 1988, with Dr. Eubert Mashaire as the first High Commissioner. Later Zimbabwean representatives included Lucas Pande Tavaya (1990–1994), and Professor Hasu Patel (1994–2000).

In October 1991, Prime Minister Bob Hawke visited Harare as part of the Commonwealth Heads of Government Meeting. Hawke met President Mugabe and advocated for the Zimbabwe government's approval of the Hartley platinum mine proposed by BHP. On his visit, Hawke expressed to parliament:

My short bilateral visit to Zimbabwe at the invitation of President Mugabe was a particular pleasure for me. In part, President Mugabe's invitation was a mark of appreciation for the role which Australia played in the long and difficult process of securing Zimbabwe's independence - and I pay tribute here to the part which my predecessor Mr Malcolm Fraser played in this; for the support we offered through our peacekeeping forces and election observers in the transition period; and for our aid and assistance in the immediate aftermath of independence and since.... I was heartened by the commitment to multi-party democracy in Zimbabwe which President Mugabe evinced in our discussions.

In 2014, when being interviewed by Dr Sue Onslow of the Institute of Commonwealth Studies, Hawke later expressed his view of having met Mugabe: "I hated him. He’s one of the worst human beings I’ve ever met. He treated black and white with equal contempt. He was a horrible human being."

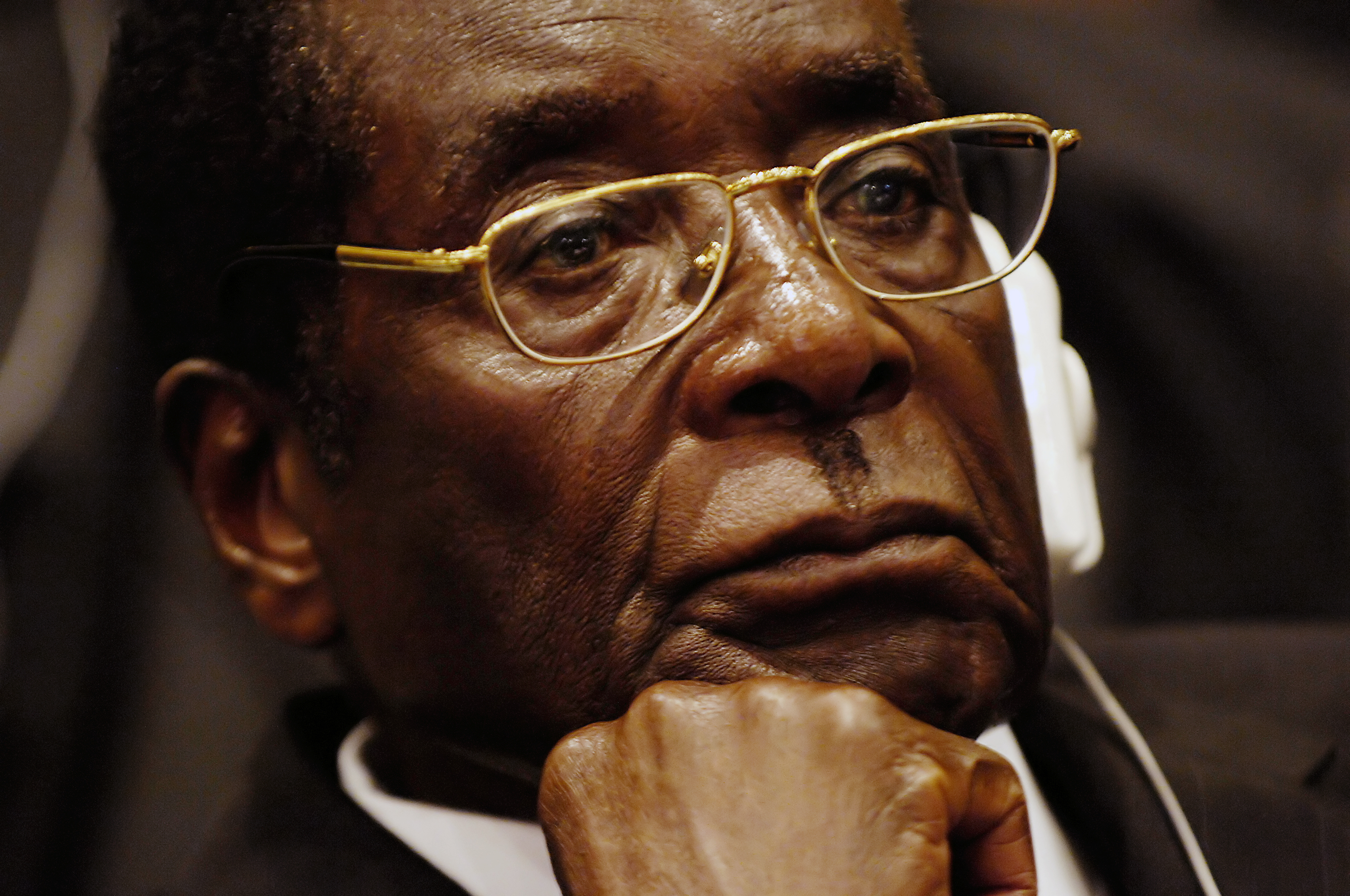
Robert Mugabe, leader of Zimbabwe from independence in 1980 to 2017.

Relations between the two countries began to sour when the government in Zimbabwe began its controversial land reform programme, occupying farms owned by members of Zimbabwe's white minority, sometimes by force. Following evidence of violence and intimidation in the 2002 Presidential election, Australian Prime Minister John Howard, alongside South African president, Thabo Mbeki, and the Nigerian president, Olusegun Obasanjo, led efforts which resulted in Zimbabwe's suspension (and eventual voluntary departure) from the Commonwealth of Nations in 2002–2003. The fourth Zimbabwean high commissioner in Canberra, Florence Chitauro (2001–2006), became the first ambassador in 2003 following Zimbabwe's departure from the Commonwealth, and in December 2003 was summoned to the Department of Foreign Affairs and Trade to explain comments she made about Howard to the effect that he was "acting like a dictator" as chair of the Commonwealth action group on Zimbabwe.

In an unusually blunt declaration in 2007, Prime Minister Howard described Robert Mugabe as a "grubby dictator". Howard also called for other African countries to put pressure on Zimbabwe to crack down on the increasingly autocratic Zimbabwean government. Sporting links between the two countries were also disrupted, with the Howard government banning the Australian cricket team from taking part in a scheduled tour of the country, citing the propaganda boost that it would provide for the Mugabe régime.

Howard's successor as Prime Minister of Australia, Kevin Rudd, was also critical of the Zimbabwean Government. Before the 2007 election, he criticised the People's Republic of China for providing "soft loans" to the Zimbabwean Government, and later offered aid to Zimbabwe only if the 2008 elections in that country were "fair". In December 2013 the Zimbabwean Ambassador to Australia since 2010, Jacqueline Zwambila, resigned and sought asylum in Australia due to fears of arrest should she return to Zimbabwe due to her links with Prime Minister Morgan Tsvangirai and the official opposition.

On 22 November 2017, following Mugabe's resignation as President following a coup d'état, Foreign Minister Julie Bishop noted that Australia "welcomes the resignation of Zimbabwe’s Leader Robert Mugabe after 37 years of increasingly authoritarian and oppressive rule. His resignation provides an opportunity for Zimbabwe to establish proper conditions for free and fair elections to take place and to transition to an inclusive, peaceful constitutional democracy." With the inauguration of a new President, Emmerson Mnangagwa, the outgoing Australian Ambassador to Zimbabwe, Suzanne McCourt, met with the president and later commented to Zimbabwe state media that the meeting was a positive sign of improving relations between the two countries.

Monthly value of Australian imports from Zimbabwe (A$ millions) since 1988

Monthly value of Australian merchandise exports to Zimbabwe (A$ millions) since 1988

== Trade ==
Following Zimbabwean independence, bilateral trade between the two countries grew slowly. By 2007, this trade was valued at $12 million Australian dollars annually. By far the most valuable export from Zimbabwe to Australia was unprocessed tobacco, but construction materials and passenger motor vehicles were also exported. Australian exports to Zimbabwe included machinery, toys, games, sporting goods, and pottery. Despite the variety of goods being traded, neither country was a principal trading partner of the other, with Australia being ranked 34th in terms of merchandise exported by Zimbabwe, accounting for only 0.2% of total exports.

In 2002, the Howard government in Australia imposed targeted sanctions against members of the Zimbabwean government in protest against the deteriorating political situation in Zimbabwe. The sanctions were extended and strengthened in 2007. These sanctions have included restrictions on travel to and through Australia for certain members of the Zimbabwean government, suspension of all non-humanitarian aid, and prohibitions on defence links. The Rudd government in 2008 considered further sanctions against Zimbabwe, with foreign minister Stephen Smith declaring that "I've made it clear that we are open to consider more sanctions ... We are currently giving active consideration to that issue."

== Zimbabwean Australians ==
The number of Zimbabwean settlers arriving in Australia (monthly) since 1991.

- Greg Aplin, Member of the NSW Parliament for Albury (2003–2019). He moved to Australia from Zimbabwe in 1981, after several years as a civil servant, including as Director of the Rhodesia/Zimbabwe Information Centre in Sydney (1977–1980).
- Chris Ellison, Senator for Western Australia (1993–2009) Minister for Justice (2001–2007).
- Andrew Murray, Senator for Western Australia (1996–2008), migrated to Australia in 1989.
- Henry Olonga, the first black player in the Zimbabwean cricket team, fled to Australia after being charged with treason in Zimbabwe, stemming from an incident where he wore a black armband in an international cricket match to protest against the "death of democracy in Zimbabwe". Olonga later met and married an Australian woman that he met in Adelaide while attending the Australian Institute of Sport's cricket programme.
- Zimbabwean cricketer Eddo Brandes settled in Australia after his retirement from international cricket, where he now coaches a team in the Brisbane grade cricket competition.
- Air Marshal Norman Walsh, second Commander of the Air Force of Zimbabwe, migrated to Australia after resigning in 1983.
- David Pocock, Senator for Australian Capital Territory and former rugby union player, migrated to Australia in 2002.
- Air Vice-Marshal Harold Hawkins, Born in Toowoomba, Queensland, in 1922. Moved to Southern Rhodesia in 1946 after wartime service with the RAAF, and served as Chief of Staff of the Royal Rhodesian Air Force (1965–1968). Representative of Rhodesia in South Africa (1969–1980). Died in South Africa in 1988.
- Air Marshal Archibald Wilson, Rhodesian Chief of the Air Staff (1968–1973), Rhodesian and Zimbabwean politician, migrated to Australia in 1982 and Australian citizen from 1988.

At the 2006 Australian census, 20,158 people listed themselves as having been born in Zimbabwe. Of these, ten thousand (or roughly 50%) had arrived since 2001. The 2011 Census recorded 30,252 Zimbabwe-born people in Australia, an increase of 50.1% from 2006, with the largest populations in Western Australia (9817), Queensland (8341), and New South Wales (5639).
