= Ministry of External Affairs (Rhodesia) =

Foreign affairs government office of Rhodesia

The Ministry of External Affairs was an agency (cabinet ministry) of the Rhodesian government. It was involved in running the Rhodesian mission in Lisbon and Rhodesia's unofficial embassies in the United States (the Rhodesian Information Office), Australia (the Rhodesia Information Centre) and France.

== See also ==
- Ministry of Foreign Affairs (Zimbabwe)
