= Sekai Holland =

Zimbabwean former politician

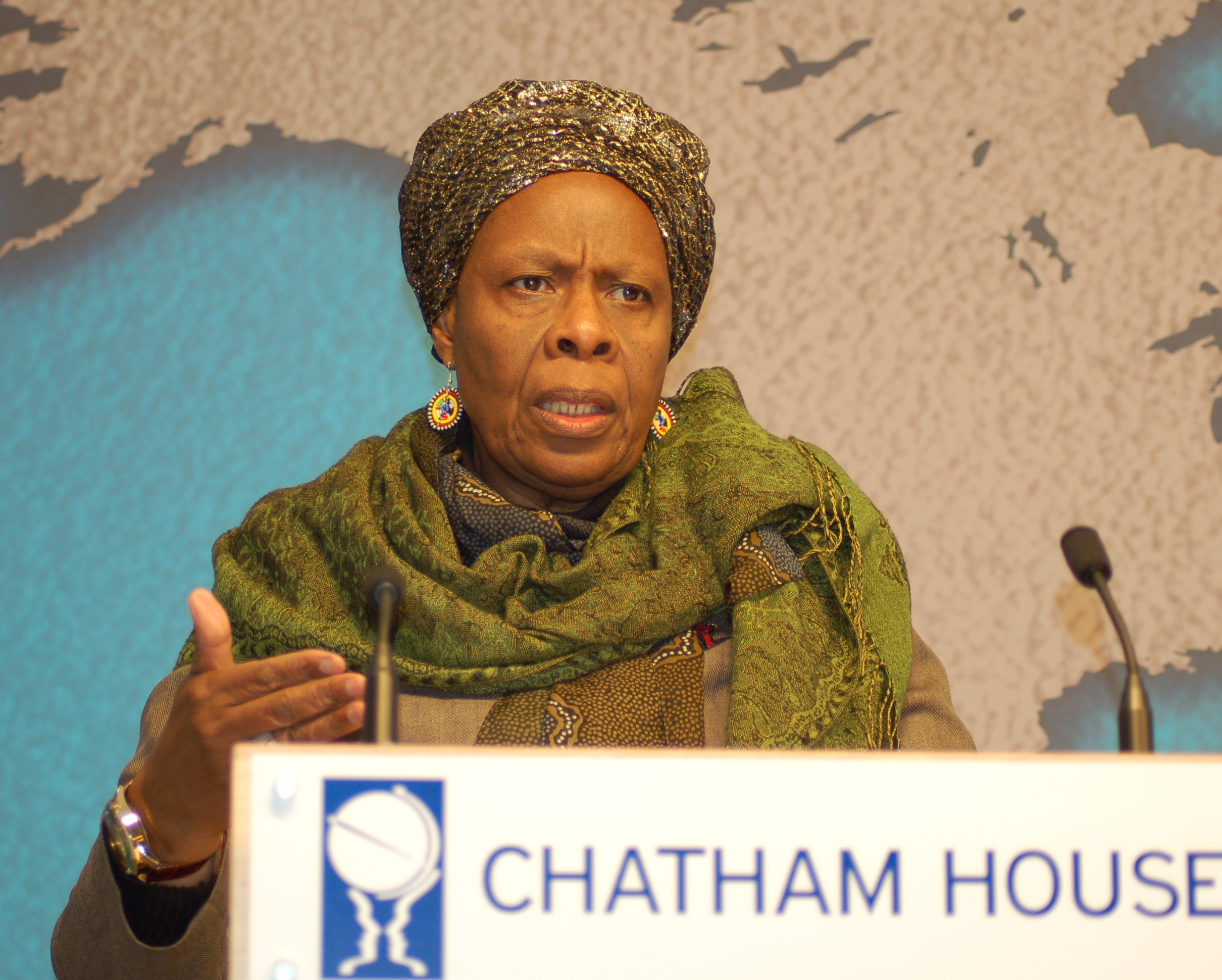
- Holland in 2010
- Born: 1942 (age 83–84); Zimbabwe
- Occupation: Politician
- Spouse: Jim Holland

Sekai Holland (born 1942) is a Zimbabwean former politician who served as Minister of State for National Healing, Reconciliation and Integration in the administrations of President Robert Mugabe and Prime Minister Morgan Tsvangirai. Sekai has been involved in campaigning on a number of human rights issues, including those relating to Aboriginal Australians, apartheid in South Africa and the women's rights and democracy in Zimbabwe.

Her father, the writer and magazine editor Masotsha Mike Hove, was elected in 1953 as a special representative to the first Federation of Rhodesia and Nyasaland parliament. He had the distinction of being the first African allowed to be designated an "employee" under the regulations pertaining to the Rhodesian Guild of Journalists in Southern Rhodesia.

She has dedicated her life to campaigning for human rights, democracy and the empowerment of woman. She was recognised in 2012 with the Sydney Peace Prize, Australia's only international prize for peace.

== Education and career ==
Sekai Holland travelled to Australia as a student, where she attended the Australian National University in Canberra, where she met her future husband, Jim Holland, the son of an Australian diplomat. Later moving to Sydney, she became Director of the Free Zimbabwe Centre, established in opposition to the Rhodesia Information Centre, operated by the white minority government of Ian Smith, and initially known as the Alternative Rhodesia Information Centre. In 1979, Holland completed a Bachelor of Arts (Communication) at the University of Technology Sydney, from where she was awarded an honorary doctorate in 2013. Following Zimbabwe's independence in 1980, she and her husband returned to the country to be part of the nation-building project.

In the 1980s and 1990s, Sekai completed a Master of Science (Agricultural Journalism) at the University of Wisconsin (Madison), and worked in a number of volunteer and paid roles including:

- Director: Free Zimbabwe Centre Sydney, Australia 1971 – 1980
- Founding member of Southern Africa Liberation Centre, Sydney Australia 1971 – 1980
- Representative of Zimbabwe African National Union: Australasia, South East Asia and the Far East 1974 – 1976
- Treasurer: Association of Women's Clubs 1980 – 1986
- Zimbabwe Institute of Mass Communications (Harare): Founder Research Coordinator 1981
- National Chairperson: Association of Women's Clubs (AWC) 1986 – 1999
- Lecturer in Media Studies: 1982 – 1987
- Consultant with Martinelli and Associates as Sociologist for Water and Sanitation Project in Matebeleland South: 1987 – 1989
- Media Coordinator: European Union Delegation in Zimbabwe: 1990 – 1991
- Sociologist for German Bank in Swaziland Dam Project for the Government of Swaziland 1992
- Consultant: Association of Women's Clubs (AWC) 1999 – ongoing

== Political career ==
- Movement for Democratic Change Founding Member: 1999
- Secretary for International Affairs (MDC) 1999 – 2003
- Secretary for Policy and Research (MDC) 2006 – 2011
- Candidate for MDC Mberengwa East Constituency 2000 and 2005 Parliamentary Elections
- Elected to Senate for Chizhanje Electorate on the edge of Harare, March 2008 national elections
- Appointed Special Minister of State and Co-Minister in Organ for National Healing, Reconciliation and Integration, March 2009–13.
- Awarded the French Legion of Honour (Légion d'honneur) 2011.
- Awarded the Sydney Peace Prize 2012
- Founder and Leader of MDC Renewal 2014
- Expelled from Parliament along with all other MDC Renewal MPs, 21 March 2015.
- Withdrew from all political parties following fragmentation and violence in MDC
- Focused on grassroots community organising from 2015 with the National Peace Trust, which was renamed the Zimbabwe Peacebuilding Initiative (ZimPI) in 2019.

== Human rights campaigns ==
=== Anti-Apartheid Movement ===
Sekai was a founder of the Anti-Apartheid Movement in Australia in the late 1960s, she helped to establish the Murrawina Child Care Centre in Redfern, and she worked actively with the Aboriginal community on the land rights campaign.

=== Rights of Women ===
Sekai helped resuscitate the important but moribund Association of Women's Clubs (AWC – 60 000 members), a grassroots rural women's development organisation established in 1938 by an 18-year-old African woman. With Sekai as its National Chairperson AWC became active in speaking for the rights of women against the increasingly repressive Mugabe government. The leadership was gazetted and banned from AWC by the government. Sekai made a Supreme Court challenge against the government's action and won, making history with the human rights case 'Sekai Holland and Others vs the Ministry of Labour, Social Welfare and Public Service'.

=== Democratic change ===
In 1998–99 Sekai became convinced that development through NGO activity was impossible under the Mugabe government, and with Morgan Tsvangirai, she started the opposition Movement for Democratic Change (MDC) as a real alternative to one-party rule.' 'Founded in 1999, the MDC was the only substantive challenge to President Mugabe, the once admired revolutionary hero-cum-strongman, who had dominated Zimbabwe since independence in 1980. With elections scheduled for the following year, a brutal campaign of terror was underway to intimidate the increasingly popular MDC from participating in the political process.'

== Torture and death threats ==
Sekai suffered constant harassment, arrests and attempts on her life. In the 1970s in Zambia, Sekai spoke out against endemic violence against ZANU recruits in the camps and sexual abuse of female recruits. She was labelled a dissident and sentenced to death. Tipped off that her life was at risk, she escaped back to Australia (where the Melbourne Herald had printed her obituary) and continued her anti-Apartheid and Zimbabwean independence work. The most serious incident was in 2003 when she was pursued to her home in Harare and then she and her family were shot at repeatedly while trying to enter their house.

In March 2007 she was arrested and brutally tortured in a Harare police station with 39 leaders of the MDC. She sustained a broken arm, a broken leg, fractured ribs, and over 80 lacerations to her entire body caused by whipping, beating, and being stamped on by the torturers. Sekai spent 15 weeks in hospitals in Zimbabwe, South Africa, and Australia. 'In the police station, the answer to the group's inquiry was swift. They were beaten and spat on by more than a dozen police officers. Three of Holland's ribs were broken when a policewoman jumped on her. Holland's 80 injuries included a broken arm, a fractured knee, cuts and lacerations, and a leg snapped by blows from an iron bar. But she survived.'

"It was very bad for Mugabe to beat up a grandmother," says Peter Murphy of the Sydney-based Zimbabwe Information Centre. "It was well reported all across Africa." Not for the first time, Holland thought she might die. The beaten body of a photographer, who took the photo of a bloody and swollen Morgan Tsvangirai that sparked global opprobrium, was found a few days later. Tortured for hours, Holland was jailed, and finally released after two court hearings. To the fury of Mugabe, however, she was escorted by an Australian diplomat to the airport, where she was flown to South Africa for treatment.' Her Australian husband, Jim Holland, told a reporter: "The regime tried to beat her into submission and has totally failed, and she knows that she's won." Prime Minister of Australia at the time, John Howard, called Mugabe a "disaster" and Zimbabwe "a total heap of misery".

== Ministry for National Healing, Reconciliation and Integration ==
'Despite initial misgivings about working closely with Mugabe, she has said that it was the right thing to do, "a very difficult exercise but necessary because it has pushed our country out of full conflict into transition".’

In the Transitional Government set up in February 2009, Sekai worked with Ministers from two other parties, as Co-Ministers for National Healing, Reconciliation and Integration. She has driven this agency with innovative strategies that seek to incorporate traditional Zimbabwean positive cultural beliefs and practices into the entire healing process infused with the local, regional and international best practices. The new infrastructure for peace as recommended by the Organ encourages survivors of political violence, victims and perpetrators to acknowledge the history and culture of violence and to address the damage caused by violence with mechanisms to prevent future violence.

Since 2009 the Organ has initiated ongoing peace activities of partnerships between and among government ministries, civil society in Zimbabwe, the region and internationally e.g. "Shoes for Peace" which involves collecting thousands of pairs of new shoes from around the world, to be distributed to Zimbabwe's shoeless school kids – from all political backgrounds.

Sekai is negotiating with the United Nations Development Program (UNDP) for Midlands state University to partner with two Australian institutions; NSW Service for Treatment and Rehabilitation of Torture and Trauma Survivors (STARTTS) to establish a similar mental health wellness institution for survivors of political violence and Exodus Foundation which has appropriate rehabilitation programmes for refugees and internally displaced persons to establish similar grassroots based community centres to receive and train returnee refugees, internally displaced persons and stateless persons for their re integrations into communities.

Within the political processes in Zimbabwe today, Sekai continues to advocate policies which are not necessarily popular within the political elites of both major parties. She has continued her consistent advocacy for women's and children's issues and she has continually spoken out against retribution and the culture of cyclic political violence in Zimbabwe.

== Sydney Peace Prize ==
On 30 April 2012, at a reception hosted by the Australian Embassy in Harare, Sekai Holland was announced to be the 15th recipient of the Sydney Peace Prize, Australia's only international award for peace. Professor Stuart Rees, Chair of the Sydney Peace Foundation said, 'In addition to her work for the education of rural women and her founding of Australia's anti-Apartheid movement fifty years ago, Sekai Holland has been a significant leader of non-violent, democracy campaigns, and is a key figure in her country's national dialogue on how to heal the deep wounds of social conflict.'

The Sydney Peace Prize jury's citation reads: Sekai Holland: for a lifetime of outstanding courage in campaigning for human rights and democracy, for challenging violence in all its forms and for giving such astute and brave leadership for the empowerment of women.

Other distinguished recipients of the prize include Professor Muhammad Yunus, Archbishop Desmond Tutu, Mary Robinson (former United Nations High Commissioner for Human Rights, and former President of Ireland), Dr Hanan Ashrawi, former Governor General Sir William Deane, Australia's 'Father of Reconciliation' Patrick Dodson, the Indian novelist and human rights campaigner Arundhati Roy, former UN Human Rights Commission Chief Navi Pillay and the distinguished American academic and activist, Professor Noam Chomsky.

Sekai Holland traveled to Australia in November to give the City of Sydney Peace Prize Lecture in the Sydney Town Hall on Wednesday 7 November 2012, receiving the 2012 Peace Prize in a gala ceremony the next day.
