= Sydney Peace Prize =

Peace award

- Awarded for: Peace with justice and nonviolence
- Description: Peace Prize awarded by the University of Sydney
- Date: 12 November 2026
- Location: Sydney Town Hall, Sydney
- Country: Australia
- Presented by: Sydney Peace Foundation
- Established: 1998
- First award: 1998

Highlights
- Total: 27
- Website: sydneypeacefoundation.org.au

The Sydney Peace Prize is awarded by the Sydney Peace Foundation, a non profit organisation associated with the University of Sydney. The prize promotes peace with justice and the practice of nonviolence. It aims to encourage public interest and discussion about issues of peace, social justice, human rights, and non-violent conflict resolution.

== Support ==
The City of Sydney is a major supporter of the Sydney Peace Prize. This involves a significant financial contribution along with other in-kind support in order to foster peace with justice.

== The prize ==
Over three months each year, the Sydney Peace Prize jury – comprising seven individuals who represent corporate, media, academic and community sector interests – assesses the merits of the nominees' efforts to promote peace with justice. It is awarded to an organisation or individual:

- who has made significant contributions to global peace including improvements in personal security and steps towards eradicating poverty, and other forms of structural violence
- whose role and responsibilities enable the recipient to use the prize to further the cause of peace with justice
- whose work illustrates the philosophy and principles of non-violence

== Considerations ==
The jury has been prepared to make some controversial choices. Sydney Peace Foundation Founder, Emeritus Professor Stuart Rees, said, "The initiators of the Sydney Peace Prize aimed to influence public interest in peace with justice, an ideal which is often perceived as controversial. The choice of a non-controversial candidate for a peace prize would be a safe option but unlikely to prompt debate or to increase understanding. Consensus usually encourages compliance, often anaesthetises and seldom informs."

== Prize winners ==
| Year | Winner | Birth/death | Known For |
|---|---|---|---|
| 1998 | Professor Muhammad Yunus | 1940–present | Founder of the Grameen Bank for the poor, chief adviser of Bangladesh, and Nobel Peace Prize laureate |
| 1999 | Archbishop Emeritus Desmond Tutu | 1931–2021 | Archbishop of Cape Town and Nobel Peace Prize laureate |
| 2000 | Xanana Gusmão | 1946–present | Poet, artist and president of East Timor |
| 2001 | Sir William Deane | 1931–present | Former Governor-General of Australia |
| 2002 | Mary Robinson | 1944–present | Former United Nations High Commissioner for Human Rights and President of Ireland |
| 2003 | Hanan Ashrawi | 1946–present | Palestinian academic and human rights campaigner |
| 2004 | Arundhati Roy | 1961–present | Indian novelist and peace activist |
| 2005 | Olara Otunnu | 1950–present | United Nations Under Secretary General for Children and Armed Conflict from Uganda |
| 2006 | Irene Khan | 1956–present | Secretary General of Amnesty International |
| 2007 | Hans Blix | 1938–present | Chairman of the UN Weapons of Mass Destruction Commission |
| 2008 | Patrick Dodson | 1948–present | Chairman of the Lingiari Foundation, "father of reconciliation" |
| 2009 | John Pilger | 1939–2023 | Australian journalist and documentary maker |
| 2010 | Vandana Shiva | 1952–present | Indian social justice and environmental activist, eco-feminist and author |
| 2011 | Noam Chomsky | 1928–present | American linguist and activist |
| 2012 | Sekai Holland | 1942–present | Zimbabwean Senator |
| 2013 | Cynthia Maung | 1959–present | Burmese doctor |
| 2014 | Julian Burnside | 1949–present | Australian barrister, human rights and refugee advocate |
| 2015 | George Gittoes | 1949–present | Australian artist who chronicles conflicts around the world |
| 2016 | Naomi Klein | 1970–present | Canadian journalist, author and prominent activist for climate justice |
| 2017 | Black Lives Matter | Founded 2013 | International civil rights activist movement |
| 2018 | Joseph E. Stiglitz | 1943–present | American economist and academic |
| 2019 | Tarana Burke and Tracey Spicer | 1973–present and 1967–present, respectively | American founders of the #MeToo Movement |
| 2020 | Midnight Oil | Founded 1972 | Australian rock band |
| 2021 | The Uluru Statement from the Heart | Issued 2017 | A petition for constitutional change by Australian Aboriginal and Torres Strait Islander leaders |
| 2022 | The Uluru Statement from the Heart | Issued 2017 | A petition for constitutional change by Australian Aboriginal and Torres Strait Islander leaders |
| 2023 | Nazanin Boniadi | 1980–present | British actress and activist |
| 2024 | International Red Cross and Red Crescent Movement | Founded 1863 | Humanitarian Organisation |
| 2025 | Dr Navi Pillay | 1941–present | Former UN High Commissioner for Human Rights and Nobel Peace Prize laureate |
| 2026 | Jennifer Robinson | 1981–present | Human Rights Lawyer And Barrister |

== Gold medal for Peace with Justice ==
The foundation also occasionally awards a special gold medal for significant contributions to peace and justice. Winners of the gold medal include South African statesman Nelson Mandela, 14th Dalai Lama Tenzin Gyatso, Japanese Buddhist leader Daisaku Ikeda, WikiLeaks publisher Julian Assange, Costa Rican Christina Figueres and Australian band Midnight Oil.
