= Rhodesia-Australia Association =

Australian organisation

The Rhodesia-Australia Association was an organisation in Australia that advocated in support of the white minority regime in Rhodesia. It was active during the 1960s and 1970s, up to the end of white minority rule in Rhodesia and the transition to Zimbabwe. It had branches in all states of Australia. The association's activities mainly comprised letter writing campaigns directed at newspapers, film nights and regular meetings.

Some members of the far-right Australian League of Rights and National Socialist Party of Australia were involved with the Rhodesia-Australia Association. Other members were emigre Rhodesians, South Africans and older Australians who were nostalgic for the British Empire. There were tensions between the older Australians and the far right activists. In 1972 commentator and Australian Labor Party staffer Richard V. Hall estimated that the association probably had fewer than one thousand members.

The association had contact with the Rhodesia Information Centre, the unofficial Rhodesian Government diplomatic mission in Australia. Each edition of The Rhodesian Commentary periodical that the centre distributed included a page on the activities of Rhodesia-Australia Association branches; most of the other content was produced in Rhodesia.
