= Bradley v Commonwealth =

Judgement of the High Court of Australia

- Court: High Court of Australia
- Full case name: Bradley v. The Commonwealth
- Decided: 10 September 1973
- Citations: [1973] HCA 34, (1973) 128 CLR 557

Case opinions
- The Postmaster-General does not have the power to unilaterally cut off telephones or postal services
- Decision by: Chief Justice Barwick, Justice Gibbs
- Concurrence: Justice Stephen
- Dissent: Justice McTiernan, Justice Menzies

Bradley v Commonwealth, also referred to as the Rhodesian Information Centre case, is a 1973 High Court of Australia case. It was brought by Denzil Bradley against Australia following the Postmaster-General of Australia cutting off telephones and postal service to the Rhodesian Information Centre that he operated. The court ruled on a 3–2 majority that the Postmaster-General lacked the power to arbitrarily stop providing services.

== Background ==
Upon its election in late 1972, the Australian Labor Party Whitlam government was determined to take strong action against the white minority Rhodesian government. This differed from the stance taken by the McMahon government that had preceded it. The Whitlam government's priorities included strongly enforcing the United Nations sanctions against Rhodesia, banning visits by Rhodesian sports teams that had been racially selected and closing the Rhodesian Information Centre.

The Rhodesian Information Centre was located in Crows Nest, Sydney. Its ostensible purpose was to provide Rhodesian government-sponsored information about the country. In reality, it represented the Rhodesian Government in Australia and its activities included advising Australian businesses about how they could evade the sanctions on Rhodesia. The Rhodesian Government operated similar centres in the United States and France. At this time, only South Africa and Portugal had formal diplomatic relations with Rhodesia.

Denzil Bradley was a South African, registered as the person carrying on business under the name Rhodesian Information Centre. Prime Minister Gough Whitlam wrote to the Premier of New South Wales Robert Askin on 7 December 1972 to request that Askin's government cancel the registration of the centre's business name. The Askin Government applied to the Supreme Court of New South Wales for a declaration that would enable the cancellation of the registration of the centre's business name in March the next year. Justice Sheppard permitted the federal government to intervene, and declared that (1) "Rhodesia Information Centre" was a name suggesting a connection with the government of the territory known as Southern Rhodesia and (2) the Corporate Affairs Commission had the power to cancel the registration of the business name. Bradley later appealed to the New South Wales Court of Appeal which held in June 1974 that the federal government should not have been allowed to intervene but otherwise dismissed his appeal. While the declaration permitted the Corporate Affairs Commission to take steps to cancel the registration of the business name, it is unclear if it took any such steps and in any event the business continued under that name.

Bradley also set up and registered a newspaper called The Rhodesian Commentary and was going to send it through the Australian postal system.

On 18 April 1973, Postmaster-General Lionel Bowen issued a directive instructing the Postmaster-General's Department to cease all mail, telephone and telegram services to the centre, including locking their post office box and deregistering The Rhodesian Commentary as a newspaper. The rationale given for this was because the Postmaster-General was following an Australian government policy to not recognize Rhodesia due to United Nations Security Council Resolution 277 following Rhodesia's Unilateral Declaration of Independence from the United Kingdom in 1965 which was viewed as internationally illegal. Bradley sued over the ban, and a day later Justice Harry Gibbs of the High Court issued an interim injunction restraining the government from enforcing it.

== Case ==
The case was heard by the High Court before Chief Justice Barwick, Justice McTiernan, Justice Menzies, Justice Gibbs and Justice Stephen. Bradley argued that the Postmaster-General had violated contractual obligations and acted ultra vires. The defendants provided copies of the UN resolution as their explanation for the actions taken. They also argued that under the Post and Telegraph Act 1901, the Postmaster-General had the right to remove service and that it was not a right for Australian residents to be able to use them.

Chief Justice Barwick and Justice Gibbs delivered the verdict that the Post and Telegraph Act did not grant unilateral power to the Postmaster-General to refuse service. Section 58 of the act specified only limited circumstances where service could be withdrawn unilaterally and they ruled that this situation did not fall under those circumstances as the communications sent were not fraudulent, offensive or blasphemous. They ruled that even though Bradley was working for what was considered an illegal regime in Australia in rebellion against The Queen, as long as he was not breaking Australian law then he was entitled to protection from government interference in his or the centre's activities as the UN resolution was not a part of Australian law. Justice Stephen wrote a concurring opinion.

Justice Menzies issued a dissenting opinion which was joined by Justice McTiernan. They argued that the plaintiff had failed to demonstrate the Australian government and Postmaster-General had a legal obligation to provide postal and telephonic services.

Accordingly, as the Postmaster-General's actions in cutting off telephones and postal services were ruled as unlawful on a 3–2 majority, the injunction was granted and the telephone and postal services were ordered to be restored to the centre. The government was also ordered to pay the centre's legal costs.

== Proposed legislation ==
After the verdict, Prime Minister Whitlam stated that the government would consider amending the Post and Telegraphs Act to allow the Postmaster-General to withdraw services, possibly relying on the external affairs power of the constitution. The Whitlam government did not introduce any legislation to achieve this, however, due to competing legislative priorities and frequent disruptions to the parliamentary schedule.

In 1977 the Liberal-National Party coalition Fraser government developed draft legislation that would have allowed it to close the Rhodesian Information Centre. This move was strongly opposed by government backbenchers, and the legislation was not introduced to parliament. The Fraser government considered legislating the closure of the centre again during 1979.
