= Rhodesian mission in Lisbon =

Diplomatic mission (1965–1975)

Rhodesia (or Southern Rhodesia) had a diplomatic mission in Lisbon, the capital of Portugal, from September 1965 to May 1975. During this time, Rhodesia was initially as a self-governing colony of Britain and, after the Unilateral Declaration of Independence in November 1965, an unrecognised state. Rhodesia informed Britain of its intent to open a Lisbon mission headed by an accredited representative, independent from the British Embassy in the city, in June 1965. The Government of the United Kingdom refused to endorse the idea but Rhodesia continued nonetheless, and later that month appointed Harry Reedman to head the mission. The British government attempted unsuccessfully to block this unilateral act—Rhodesia's first—for some months afterwards.

The affair came amid the larger dispute between Whitehall and Salisbury regarding the terms under which Rhodesia could be granted sovereign independence. Rhodesia's mostly white government insisted that statehood should come under the constitution introduced with Britain's approval in 1961, while Whitehall insisted that a set timetable for the introduction of black majority rule would have to be in place before the country could be fully independent. The Rhodesian government's stance on this matter caused it to become isolated within the Commonwealth, which from 1964 excluded it from most of its internal bodies, while the Rhodesian military became unofficially embargoed by its established British and American suppliers.

Rhodesia had run itself as a self-governing colony since 1923, but ultimate responsibility for foreign affairs remained with Britain. Rhodesia's staunch opposition to immediate black rule and its disillusionment regarding Britain propelled it towards Portugal, which governed Angola and Mozambique, territories respectively to the west and east of Rhodesia. In their attempt to prove that an independent Lisbon mission was legal, the Rhodesians presented an argument based on British legislation conferring on the colonial government the right to appoint its own "diplomatic agents, or consular or trade representatives, in countries which are willing to receive them". The British countered that ultimate purview over Rhodesian foreign affairs still lay with Whitehall. They proposed that Reedman be integrated into the British Embassy in Lisbon as a Rhodesian consul, but Rhodesia refused to accept a lesser post for Reedman than those enjoyed by the independent Rhodesian representatives in South Africa and Mozambique.

Following months of abortive Anglo-Rhodesian talks and unsuccessful attempts by Britain to deter Portugal diplomatically, Reedman travelled to Lisbon in September 1965 to take up his post at the head of an independent Rhodesian mission. The Portuguese Ministry of Foreign Affairs, which insisted it was neutral regarding Rhodesia, outraged Whitehall by accepting Reedman's letter of accreditation—though Lisbon was careful to avoid provoking Britain, omitting the word "diplomatic" from the titles given to both Reedman and his mission. The Rhodesians still regarded themselves as victorious, saying they had set out to gain an independent diplomatic representative in Lisbon, and now had one. The historian J R T Wood later called this "Rhodesia's first independent and indeed unilateral act—the veritable straw in the wind." On 11 November 1965, less than two months after Reedman's investiture, Rhodesia unilaterally declared its independence from Britain. The mission in Lisbon operated until 1975, when it was closed following the Carnation Revolution in Portugal the previous year.

== Background ==
=== Responsible government, Federation and the Wind of Change ===
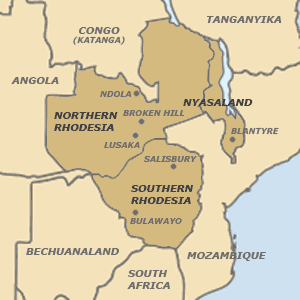
The Federation of Rhodesia and Nyasaland (1953–63)

Having been governed and developed by the British South Africa Company since the 1890s, Southern Rhodesia became a self-governing colony within the British Empire in 1923, when it was granted responsible government by Whitehall. The Southern Rhodesian capital, Salisbury, was henceforth empowered to run its own affairs in almost all matters, including defence. Foreign affairs was one of the few areas reserved by the British government. (Note: Whitehall also had exclusive rights regarding alterations to the 1923 constitution, the British-appointed Governor's salary, and bills regarding native administration, mining revenues and railways. The British government never intervened regarding these issues, regarding its reserved powers over them as for exceptional cases only. As Claire Palley comments, it would have been extremely difficult for Whitehall to enforce these kinds of powers, and attempting to do so would have been likely to cause a crisis.) As the Empire's lone self-governing colony, Southern Rhodesia was considered a sui generis case, almost on a par with a dominion. Starting in 1932, Imperial Conferences included the Southern Rhodesian Prime Minister alongside those from the dominions, a unique situation which continued after Imperial Conferences were superseded by Commonwealth Prime Ministers' Conferences in 1944.

As most of the Southern Rhodesian politicians saw it, they were as good as independent; if full autonomy were granted in the form of dominionship, the only practical difference would be a rise in expenses for foreign representation, as Salisbury would have to maintain its own embassies abroad. Believing full dominion status to be effectively symbolic and "there for the asking", Prime Minister Godfrey Huggins (in office from 1933 to 1953) regarded independence as a non-issue. He twice refused British overtures hinting at dominion status, and instead pursued an initially semi-independent Federation with the directly administered British colonies of Northern Rhodesia and Nyasaland.

Mandated by the results of the 1953 referendum, Federation began later that year with Southern Rhodesia, the most developed of the three territories, at its head. Salisbury doubled as Federal capital. The Federation was granted several privileges by Britain during its earlier years; for example, a 1957 British Act of Parliament empowered it to appoint its own "diplomatic agents, or consular or trade representatives, in countries which are willing to receive them" so long as it informed Britain when it was doing so. (Note: The act conferred on Salisbury the power "to appoint diplomatic agents, or consular or trade representatives, in countries which are willing to receive them, to deal with matters within the competence of the Federal Government".) In 1950, Southern Rhodesia established a High Commission in Pretoria, in the then Union of South Africa, after the Union had established one in Salisbury; after South Africa became a republic and left the Commonwealth in 1961, these became known as "Diplomatic Missions", each headed by an "Accredited Diplomatic Representative". An independent office representing the Federation was also set up in Lourenço Marques, the capital of Portuguese Mozambique, while further afield, Federal officials were set up within the British embassies in Japan, West Germany, and the United States.

The Federation ultimately failed because of the shifting international attitudes and rising black nationalist ambitions of the late 1950s and early 1960s, often collectively called the Wind of Change. The idea of "no independence before majority rule" gained considerable ground in British political circles as the UK, France and Belgium vastly accelerated their withdrawal from the continent. Amid a flurry of bloody civil wars, military coups and other disasters, most of the new African countries became autocratic one-party states within a few years. Already wary of black nationalism on racial grounds, Salisbury became increasingly antipathetic towards it as a result of these developments, particularly when the brutal Congo Crisis caused thousands of Congolese whites to become refugees in Northern and Southern Rhodesia. In 1962, with the Federation in its constitutional death throes amid Nyasaland's clamours for secession and immediate black rule, Federal Prime Minister Roy Welensky was horrified and outraged to be told by Britain's Secretary of State for Commonwealth Relations, Duncan Sandys, that "we British have lost the will to govern." "But we haven't," retorted Julian Greenfield, Welensky's law minister.

=== Federal dissolution; Salisbury pushes for independence ===
The Southern Rhodesians presumed that in the event of Federal dissolution, they would be first in line for independence, and would receive it without major adjustments to their 1961 constitution. (Note: Southern Rhodesia's 1961 constitution, devised jointly with Britain, was designed to gradually increase the number of black Southern Rhodesians qualified to vote. It was adopted following the results of a general referendum.) Indeed, intergovernmental correspondence during early 1963 did much to confirm Salisbury's belief that this was the case. (Note: A prominent example of this, often cited by the Southern Rhodesians, related to the alleged actions and words of the British Deputy Prime Minister and First Secretary of State R A Butler at a meeting just before the Victoria Falls Conference in June 1963. The then Southern Rhodesian Prime Minister Winston Field and his deputy Ian Smith would claim that Butler promised them "independence no later than, if not before, the other two territories" in return for Salisbury's help in winding up the Federation, "in view of your country's wonderful record of Responsible Government over the past forty years ... and above all the great loyalty you have always given to Britain in time of war". There is no written record of this meeting and Butler would deny that he had ever said such a thing.) While Federal break-up talks progressed, Sandys issued a letter of intent in which he said that powers conferred on the Federal government by British legislation would transfer to Southern Rhodesia at the end of Federation. It was agreed that Salisbury would keep the Federal overseas missions in Pretoria and Lourenço Marques, as well as the British Embassy desks in Bonn, Tokyo and Washington. Arrangements for Federal dissolution concluded in mid-1963, and the Federation formally ended on 31 December that year. Northern Rhodesia and Nyasaland became independent during 1964, respectively renamed Zambia and Malawi, under black majority governments. Southern Rhodesia was denied the same on the grounds that whites held too dominant a position, prompting indignation and fury from the governing Rhodesian Front (RF) and its supporters. Prime Minister Winston Field's failure to secure independence from Britain during early 1964 led to his forced resignation and replacement by his deputy, Ian Smith, in April that year.

Two months into his premiership, Smith was deeply offended when Whitehall informed him that, for the first time since 1932, Southern Rhodesia would not be represented at the year's Commonwealth Prime Ministers' Conference as the decision had been taken to only include fully independent states in future. The quarrel over the terms for independence caused the Southern Rhodesian military's traditional British and American suppliers to impose an informal embargo, and motivated Britain to cut off financial aid to Salisbury around the same time. The United States promptly followed suit. (Note: Soon after Britain ceased its financial assistance, the United States halted its own smaller aid contributions to Rhodesia in June 1964. When pressed on the subject in July 1965 by Rhodesia's finance minister, John Wrathall, Britain's Cledwyn Hughes explained that the resumption of financial assistance would depend on progress towards an independence settlement acceptable to Britain. Neither Whitehall nor the British public would back economic aid to Rhodesia with the independence issue on rocky ground, he said, as Britain had financial difficulties of its own. Wrathall complained to no avail that Britain was still finding room in its tight budget to aid other countries, and Rhodesia resented being excluded.) Political violence between the rival black nationalist movements in Rhodesia intensified during mid-1964, leading to jail terms or preventive restriction for several prominent nationalists, and concurrent bans for their respective parties. (Note: Joshua Nkomo led the Zimbabwe African People's Union (ZAPU), which was Marxist–Leninist and aligned with the Warsaw Pact, while the Reverend Ndabaningi Sithole and Robert Mugabe were respectively chairman and party secretary of the Zimbabwe African National Union (ZANU), a Maoist party backed by the People's Republic of China and its allies. Both ZANU and ZAPU were banned in Rhodesia on 26 August 1964, with Nkomo, Sithole, Mugabe and others detained indefinitely. The remaining leaders of ZANU and ZAPU thereupon moved their respective headquarters to Zambia. Nkomo, Sithole and Mugabe remained in prison until December 1974, when they were released in the run-up to the 1975 Victoria Falls Conference.) When Northern Rhodesia became Zambia in October 1964, Southern Rhodesia dropped "Southern" from its name, and initiated legislation to this effect, but Britain refused assent, saying that the colony could not legally rename itself. Salisbury continued using the shortened name anyway.

The Rhodesian government was ardently anti-communist, and opposed immediate black rule, which Smith said would cause "the destruction of our country", pointing to ongoing events such as the Congo Crisis as evidence. Parliament remained mostly white, but Salisbury contended it had close to unanimous support from all races in pursuing independence under the 1961 constitution, citing various tests of opinion it conducted in late 1964. (Note: The Rhodesian government convened a national indaba (tribal conference) in October 1964, inviting 622 black chiefs, headmen and other traditional representatives to Domboshawa, near Salisbury. Their unanimous backing of independence under the 1961 constitution was cited by Salisbury as evidence that the country's tribal population supported the government line. A month later a general independence referendum of the mostly white electorate was held, which yielded an 89% "yes" vote.) The Prime Minister stood obdurately against any constitutional change he believed was too radical, regarding this as a matter of national and regional security. According to his memoirs, he worked to prevent a "mad rush into one man, one vote with all the resultant corruption, nepotism, chaos and economic disaster which we had witnessed in all the countries around us." The Labour Cabinet of British Prime Minister Harold Wilson, which replaced the previous Conservative administration in October 1964, did not give credence to the Rhodesian tests of opinion, and insisted on majority rule as a condition for independence. The Commonwealth repeatedly urged Britain to intervene directly should Rhodesian defiance continue, while British liberals worried that if left unchecked Salisbury might drift towards South African-style apartheid.

=== Britain, Portugal and Rhodesia ===
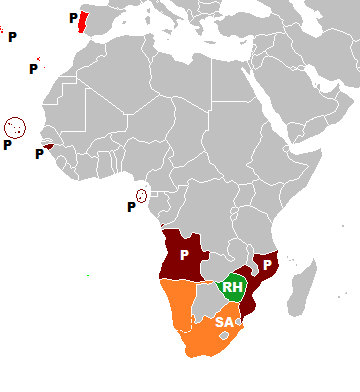
Portugal (P), Rhodesia (RH) and South Africa (SA) formed what Britain called "a defiant and mutually sustaining bloc" in southern Africa during the 1960s.

British policy-makers regarded Portugal as a traditional friend—the Anglo-Portuguese Alliance dated back to 1386, and both countries were in the North Atlantic Treaty Organisation (NATO) and the European Free Trade Association—but the combined strength of the communist bloc and the Afro-Asian lobby in the United Nations forced the British to peel back their support for the pluricontinental Estado Novo ("New State") during the early 1960s. Portugal's Colonial War, starting in Angola in 1961, pitted it against a number of guerrilla factions in its African territories, most of which subscribed to communist political thinking. Britain opposed communist encroachment into southern Africa, but knew it would become an international pariah if it publicly opposed general consensus at the UN, which roundly condemned colonialism in all forms and supported communist-backed insurgencies across the region, regarding them as racial liberation movements. It therefore attempted an awkward balancing act whereby it would appear to oppose Portugal without meaningfully doing so.

Britain's stance towards Rhodesia was influenced in a similar way, with Whitehall unable to back down on the policy of no independence before majority rule without causing international uproar. Also contributory was the disproportionate sway over Britain's African policy held by Julius Nyerere, the President of Tanzania, who was a fervent proponent for majority rule across Africa without delay, implemented by military force if need be. British politicians deferred to Nyerere on almost every proposal they made regarding Rhodesia during the 1960s and 1970s. In the immediate post-Federal period, Britain forlornly tried to stifle Rhodesia's further alignment with South Africa and Portugal, realising that British influence in the region was severely limited while the three remained so closely linked. A 1965 British government memorandum described the trio as "a defiant and mutually sustaining bloc".

Great personal rapport developed between Smith and his Portuguese counterpart, António de Oliveira Salazar. On first meeting in Portugal in September 1964, the two Prime Ministers found they shared many common views regarding race relations in their respective countries, Britain's handling of the Commonwealth, and what Smith called the "complacency of the major powers of the free world" in the face of what the pair saw as inexorable communist expansionism. After hearing Smith's argument in favour of Rhodesian independence, Salazar privately pledged Portugal's complete support. The RF called a new general election for May 1965 and, campaigning on an election promise of independence, won a clean sweep of all 50 "A"-roll seats. A week later, Wilson met with Portuguese Foreign Minister Alberto Franco Nogueira, whom he pressed on Portugal's secret dealings with Rhodesia. Nogueira categorically denied anything of the sort.

== Rhodesia seeks British endorsement for a Lisbon mission ==
=== Gibbs' speech on 9 June ===
Following the Rhodesian Front's decisive May 1965 election victory, parliament was opened by the British-appointed Governor, Sir Humphrey Gibbs, on 9 June. For the first time, Rhodesia had an official Leader of the Opposition who was black: Josiah Gondo, leader of the United People's Party, now sat opposite Smith and the all-white RF in the Legislative Assembly. Though Gibbs represented the British Crown in Rhodesia, he had been a local resident most of his life, and had feet in both camps, regarding himself as loyal both to Rhodesia and to the monarch. While opening parliament, he told the Assembly that the RF's strengthened majority amounted to "a mandate to lead the country to its full independence"—later in the speech he referred to this as "our independence".

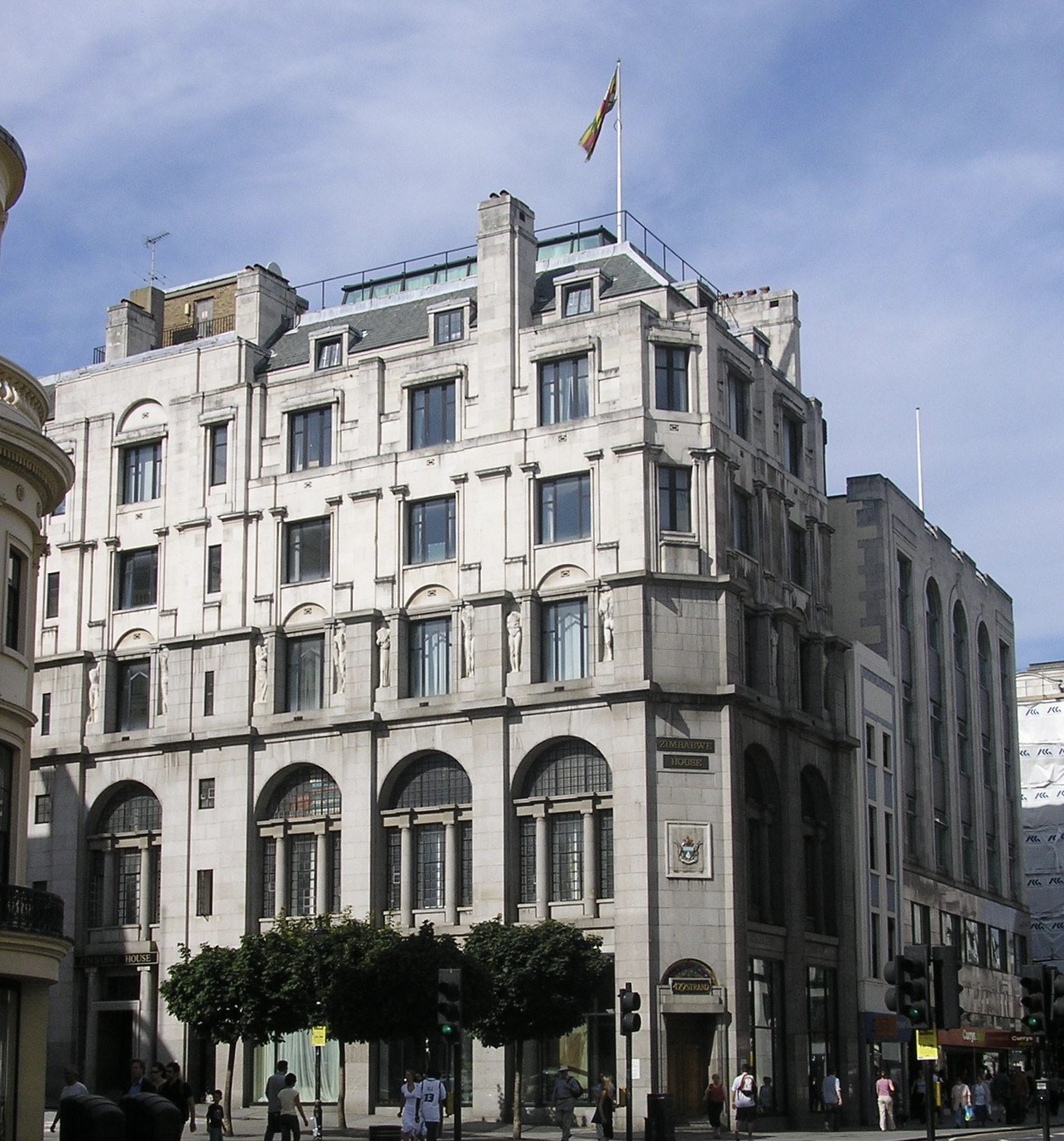
Rhodesia House was the office of the colony's High Commissioner in London. (2006 photograph)

Gibbs then said that Rhodesia wished to have the best possible relations with its neighbours, and startled British observers by saying the government had informed him that it would follow recommendations made by Portugal during recent talks, and would open its own diplomatic mission in the Portuguese capital Lisbon as soon as was practical. Evan Campbell, Rhodesia's High Commissioner in London, asked Whitehall the same day to endorse the appointment of Harry Reedman as Rhodesia's "accredited representative" to Portugal, reasoning that the 1957 act allowing the Federation to do so still covered Rhodesia under the principle of national succession. The 1963 letter of intent from Sandys confirmed this in Rhodesia's eyes. Historian J R T Wood calls this "Rhodesia's first independent and indeed unilateral act—the veritable straw in the wind."

=== Rhodesian motivations ===
Aside from reinforcing Luso-Rhodesian relations, the Lisbon appointment was designed to secure the African nation a diplomatic foothold in Europe outside of Britain's reach and to help Salisbury find new trading partners and diplomatic allies on the continent. Among other things, the Rhodesians intended to make up the shortfalls in military equipment caused by the undeclared Anglo-American arms embargo. Reedman, the former minister for immigration and tourism, was also a retired officer of the British Royal Air Force (where he had been involved in bomber research), and an experienced engineer and businessman: all the right ingredients, the government thought, for someone in the position to source European aircraft, weapons and other equipment, while also representing Rhodesian interests in mainland Europe. Within Rhodesia, he was known for making unusual public statements and harbouring a fear of a Chinese conquest of southern Africa.

Lord Brockway, head of the Movement for Colonial Freedom, believed that Rhodesia was attempting to assert de facto independence in the eyes of the international community by deliberately defying Britain over the Lisbon issue. "If Salisbury is permitted to claim diplomatic rights in foreign capitals, its assertion of sovereignty is accepted," he wrote in an article for the British democratic socialist weekly Tribune.

=== Britain refuses ===
Britain was caught unprepared by Campbell's request, and issued no response for over a week. In the meantime Campbell, whose retirement was due, was relieved by the Rhodesian government on 10 June. His replacement, Brigadier Andrew Skeen, took over Campbell's London office at Rhodesia House, 429 Strand six days later.

Bent on securing Reedman's investiture quickly, the Rhodesian government made it publicly known on 19 June that, pursuant to British and Portuguese approval, Reedman would be appointed within seven days. Whitehall still took no action. Wilson and his Secretary of State for Commonwealth Relations, Arthur Bottomley, were occupied at Chequers, the official country residence of the British Prime Minister, where they were entertaining the Commonwealth heads of state.

In Bottomley's absence, his office explored the issue and resolved that Rhodesia could retain its representative in South Africa, but should not be allowed to appoint another in Lisbon; a consul was acceptable, they concluded, but only as part of the British Embassy staff. Bottomley remained unaware of this progress until a call from his office on 25 June, whereupon he still did nothing. Unwilling to wait, Rhodesia confirmed Reedman's appointment the next day, much to Wilson's fury. Only now was Bottomley finally jolted into action; he informed Salisbury of his ministry's findings on 29 June, offering them the consul within the embassy, but refusing to sanction an independent office.

== Early negotiations ==
=== Rhodesian disillusionment; Britain adopts delaying tactics ===
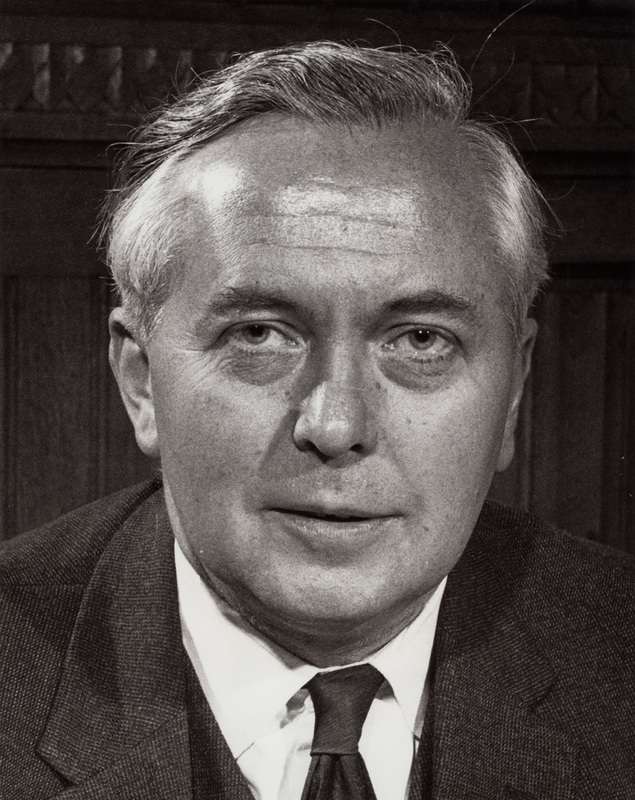
British Prime Minister Harold Wilson believed he could bring Ian Smith to heel by stonewalling him.

Independence talks between Britain and Rhodesia continued for a fortnight without major reference to the Reedman appointment, with Britain more concerned with discussing a possible Rhodesian unilateral declaration of independence (UDI). Smith delivered an openly defiant speech to his parliament on 30 June, attacking Britain for its handling of the Commonwealth's newer members, which he said were unduly influencing British policy in Africa. Britain was desperate to avoid the international humiliation that would accompany the organisation's break-up, he claimed, and was therefore attempting to hold it together by appeasing the less prominent members. While making clear his disdain, the Prime Minister pledged to go on with negotiations, saying that he did not believe Britain truly endorsed its professed line.

In dealing with the immovable Smith, Wilson's ministers adopted a programme of deliberate frustration and delay: Britain would interminably stonewall the Rhodesian Prime Minister, maintaining the facade of continued negotiation by very occasionally repeating their stance, in the hope that either Smith would back down, or his Cabinet would eventually lose faith in his negotiating prowess and replace him with somebody more malleable. Wood writes that Wilson, Bottomley and their Labour contemporaries were "distracted by their own political agendas", and did not understand the extent of Rhodesia's considerable disillusionment with Britain by this time. Effectively "kicked ... out of the Commonwealth", as Huggins later commented, a fortress mentality was developing in Salisbury, propelling it towards unilateral action. Wood concludes that Britain's maintenance of this stonewalling tactic was misjudged, and only exacerbated the Rhodesian government's feeling of alienation.

Southern Rhodesia's independent appointment of representation to Lisbon generated fears in the British government that Smith was gradually seeking independence for his territory. In the British House of Lords on 26 July, Brockway pressed Lord Taylor, the Under-Secretary of State for the Colonies, on Rhodesia's claims, arguing that failure to block the Lisbon appointment would amount to conceding de facto recognition to Rhodesia as an independent state. Taylor's response was that Britain remained committed to upholding its ultimate purview over Rhodesian overseas relations. Brockway then asked how Rhodesia had attained its independent office in Pretoria; surely, he said, this provided "a precedent which was rather dangerous?" Taylor replied that Pretoria and Salisbury had exchanged High Commissioners before South Africa left the Commonwealth in 1961, and that Britain had granted Rhodesia special dispensation to retain the Pretoria mission thereafter. He stressed that in Britain's eyes this was no precedent for Lisbon.

=== Britain despatches Cledwyn Hughes to Rhodesia, 22–27 July ===
The British decided to despatch one of their Commonwealth ministers to Rhodesia for talks during early July, but debated for a while over whether it should be Bottomley or his deputy, Cledwyn Hughes, who should be sent. Wilson considered this a matter of urgency as he had heard a rumour that Rhodesia might declare independence on its main national holiday, Rhodes' Day (that year 12 July), but this proved false. On 15 July, Britain's High Commissioner to Rhodesia, John Baines Johnston, was instructed to propose a week-long round of talks between Smith and Hughes in Salisbury. Johnston was given permission to cave if the Rhodesian Prime Minister insisted on meeting with Bottomley, but this did not prove necessary: Smith cabled back on the 18th accepting Hughes' visit. The British delegation arrived in Salisbury four days later.

Discussions proceeded rapidly during the week, but did not touch on the issue of Lisbon until the fifth day, 26 July, when Hughes and Johnston met with Smith, Deputy Prime Minister Clifford Dupont, and Trade and Industry Minister George Rudland. Dupont opened the discussion by referring to Sandys' statement from 1963, which said the Rhodesian government would retain any rights previously granted to the Federation, which Dupont reasoned surely included the ability given in 1957 to appoint its own overseas agents if it informed Britain. As Portugal had indicated its willingness to accept a Rhodesian diplomat, Dupont said, the Rhodesian government was acting perfectly within its rights.

Hughes countered that he did not believe the wording of the 1957 document gave Rhodesia the right to devise its own representation overseas without first gaining assent from Britain. The Reedman appointment would probably be seen internationally as a major rise in Rhodesian diplomatic profile, he said, and might damage Britain's reputation, which would in turn make the ongoing negotiations for independence more difficult for both sides. He repeated Bottomley's previous offer of a consul on the British Embassy staff, adding that the official would not have to be physically located within the embassy, and could set up his own office elsewhere so long as he remained nominally affiliated to it.

Smith replied that in his interpretation Rhodesia was required to keep Whitehall informed, but prior British concurrence was not necessary; if Britain contested this, the Prime Minister said, then surely the 1957 entrustment had never meant anything. Dupont then spoke again, rejecting the idea that the Rhodesian mission should be a mere subsidiary consulate of the British Embassy. Hughes replied firmly that the 1957 despatch did not give the Rhodesians free rein over external matters, and warned them to be more flexible if they intended to find common ground. Eager to avoid open confrontation, Smith told Dupont to reconsider his tone, and changed the subject.

Hughes met with several other Rhodesian figures before leaving late on 27 July, but Lisbon remained off the programme most of the time. Just before Hughes departed, Dupont released a statement saying that Reedman would take office in Lisbon on 1 August, and would be "warmly welcomed" by the Portuguese government. Hughes decried this in a brief telephone call to Smith, but could do little more before leaving Rhodesia that evening. On 29 July, Smith fielded questions from the press, commenting on both Lisbon and the independence talks in general. He expressed the belief that Rhodesia had made more progress towards independence talking with Hughes than it ever had before, but qualified this by saying only Wilson's reply to the proposals given to Hughes would show if this were indeed true. He said that although he thought Whitehall was keen to resolve the independence issue, he did not believe their line had changed. He declared that he and the RF would not change their stance in any way. Moving to the subject of Lisbon, Smith stressed that this was separate from the independence dispute, then overruled Dupont's announcement of two days before: Reedman's appointment would remain provisional until further notice, he said.

== Anglo-Rhodesian animosity deepens ==
=== Bottomley tours West Africa, arousing Rhodesian suspicion ===
Bottomley toured West Africa during early August, and, in Ghana and Nigeria, gave several speeches reassuring his hosts that immediate majority rule was an unconditional requirement for Rhodesian independence. He ruled out the use of military force in the event of a Rhodesian UDI, and pledged to instead end such a rebellion through economic sanctions. Bottomley's dismissal of the use of force drew damning criticism from Joshua Nkomo, the imprisoned leader of the Marxist–Leninist Zimbabwe African People's Union, who said this showed Britain was not serious about decolonising Rhodesia as it had its other African possessions. Meanwhile, Bottomley's comments increased anti-British sentiment. In his memoirs, Smith describes the mood in forthright terms, accusing Britain of "resorting to politics of convenience and appeasement". "We waited and waited ... [but] the British were not prepared to make a clear decision," he writes; "they were consulting the bankrupt and communist dictatorships before replying to us." Becoming exasperated by the lack of progress, even the more hesitant members of the Rhodesian government began to see the road leading towards UDI as the only one viable for them. Lisbon, however, remained the immediate bone of contention, and on this issue the Rhodesians became yet more determined not to give an inch.

=== Meeting between Johnston and Smith on 18 August ===
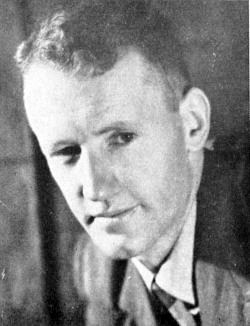
Rhodesian Prime Minister Ian Smith proposed legal arbitration to settle the Lisbon issue, which Britain rejected.

Smith organised a meeting with Johnston, starting at 09:00 on 18 August, where he informed the British High Commissioner that he had considered the Lisbon appointment extensively, with the help of Dupont, several legal advisers, and a judge of the Rhodesian High Court. The judge had examined the relevant documents, and had come to the conclusion that Dupont's interpretation of them was correct. Smith therefore felt certain that Reedman's appointment was legitimate so long as Portugal agreed. A long argument ensued, with neither man willing to budge. Smith said that he had always tried to be flexible and civil, but that he and his government felt they had to make a stand. By making clear to Lisbon the exact nature of their proposed representative, and informing Britain of their intent, Smith said the Rhodesians had filled every legal obligation.

Johnston dismissed Smith's argument, asserting that neither the Federation nor Rhodesia had ever made such an appointment (this was actually false; the Federal government had opened independent diplomatic missions in South Africa and Portuguese Mozambique, and Rhodesia retained them both). Johnston concluded that Rhodesia was trying to prematurely advance its international standing. The previous entrustments, he said, had been made to allow Britain and Rhodesia to cooperate subject to Whitehall's ultimate authority, and did not entitle Rhodesia to do as it liked in the field of external affairs, especially if its chosen line ran counter to Britain's. In an attempt to intimidate Smith, Johnston sternly asked why the Rhodesian Prime Minister would risk causing a major international incident by deliberately defying Britain; Smith replied that following Britain's several slights against Rhodesia over the previous year and a half, Salisbury would not accept another. The conversation continued in this manner for some time afterwards. Smith proposed that the relevant documents be examined jointly by two judges, one British and one Rhodesian, but Johnston refused this. The meeting ended without agreement.

=== Bottomley returns to Britain ===
The Rhodesian press reported extensively on the Lisbon controversy during the second half of August, generally predicting that neither Britain, Portugal nor Rhodesia would back down. While most reporters believed that Whitehall would take a strong line, few could see any way it could actually stop Reedman from taking office. On 20 August, Bottomley spoke at his final conference in Lagos, and repeated all he had previously said regarding Britain's stance on Rhodesia. Back in London three days later, he reaffirmed his previous stance regarding Lisbon, saying that he would be pleased to have a Rhodesian on the staff of the British Embassy there, but would allow no more. In the same interview, he expressed the belief that Wilson had averted a Rhodesian UDI in October the previous year by warning Salisbury of the economic consequences. Speaking in Gwelo on 27 August, Smith derided this statement, calling it "incredible". His administration had not even considered a declaration of independence then, he said, but it was contemplated now, and he believed Anglo-Rhodesian relations were at their all-time lowest ebb. He urged Britain to return to the bargaining table quickly.

== Britain attempts to block the appointment ==
=== Wilson resolves to challenge Portugal ===
The British continued their policy of stalling Smith. At the end of August 1965, they did not consider a Rhodesian UDI an immediate threat, and therefore focussed on the colony's maintained defiance of the mother country regarding Reedman and Lisbon. On 30 August, Johnston summarised Britain's stand on the issue for Bottomley's Commonwealth Relations Office. According to his understanding, he said, Rhodesia had been told just before Federal dissolution that it would retain the Federation's former powers regarding external affairs, but that this entrustment was subject to British discretion, and could not be exercised without extensive prior consultation and conformity to Britain's line.

Johnston rued bitterly that the Rhodesians had apparently made practical arrangements for an independent office in Lisbon anyway, even going to the trouble of renting the prospective mission premises. He repeated the claim he had made in the meeting with Smith on 18 August, saying once more that the Federal government had not made appointments off its own bat. He accepted that there was an independent Rhodesian envoy in Pretoria, but argued that this was the result of South Africa's enforced withdrawal from the Commonwealth. He did not mention the Rhodesian (formerly Federal) office in Lourenço Marques, which Wood comments could be considered "precedent for Portugal".

On 5 September, the Salisbury Sunday Mail reported that Smith was standing firm on Reedman's absolute independence in Lisbon, and that Portugal had accepted the envoy. British Foreign Secretary Michael Stewart reacted with alarm, convening an urgent meeting the same day with Hughes and Sir Archibald Ross, Britain's ambassador to Portugal. Here Hughes proposed hauling Portugal over the coals, insisting that the Lisbon mission represented "creeping independence" for Rhodesia, and therefore had to be stopped.

Ross disagreed, reasoning this would only damage relations between Britain and Portugal, an undesirable prospect given the countries' common membership in NATO, the European Free Trade Association and more. There was much at stake; Britain enjoyed an annual £48 million trade surplus with Portugal, and Portuguese Railways was in the process of buying 50 diesel locomotives from English Electric. In the Azores archipelago, Portugal provided NATO with a strategically key air base, which was unprotected by treaty; given the inclination, Lisbon might close it.

Hughes insisted that there was nothing more they could do to deter Rhodesia directly; they had already threatened to expel Rhodesia's representative from the British Embassy in Washington, with no effect. The only open course therefore had to be to take a firmer line with Portugal. Two days later, on 7 September, Wilson discussed the matter with Hughes and Stewart, and agreed with their conclusions, telling them to proceed.

=== Meeting between Johnston and Smith on 8 September; the appointment is confirmed ===
The same day, Bottomley wrote to Smith, saying that he and Wilson were disheartened by the lack of progress regarding both independence and the Lisbon appointment. He was willing to visit Rhodesia personally, but could not come until October because he had to be in Blackpool to attend the Labour Party Conference, due to commence on 26 September. The next morning, on 8 September, Johnston told Smith that if Reedman proceeded to Portugal in open disregard for Britain's wishes, it would negatively affect future independence negotiations. Rhodesia's delay in justifying the appointment was also having a detrimental affect, Johnston asserted. Finally, he threatened to evict the Rhodesian envoys from Washington, Bonn and Tokyo if Rhodesia did not desist. Smith was yet again unmoved. Any procrastination regarding Lisbon was Britain's fault, he insisted. He told Johnston to wait for the afternoon session in Rhodesia's Legislative Assembly to hear Dupont's official announcement of Reedman's appointment, as well as the full Rhodesian explanation behind it.

Smith said he understood this would irk the British, but insisted that he and his government were no longer willing to wait. He had repeatedly offered to respect the judgement of an impartial arbitration team, he reminded Johnston, but the British had shot this idea down each time. He therefore felt compelled to follow the advice given by his own legal team, which was that the appointment was legitimate. His government would not accept a lesser appointment in Lisbon than in Pretoria and Lourenço Marques. He dismissed Johnston's threat to expel the Rhodesian representatives in West Germany, Japan and America; relations with Portugal and South Africa were far more important, he said, as they were Rhodesia's two closest neighbours geographically.

Johnston protested that the British government could not take part in the kind of judicial enquiry Smith described, as its sovereignty could not be subject to any outside judgement and there was nothing to arbitrate anyway. Smith was again resolute: why, he queried, was Whitehall so adamant to avoid legal arbitration if its ministers were so sure they were right? He promised to drop the matter if such a panel ruled against him, but to no avail. Johnston said only that he would telegraph Whitehall to inform them that Reedman's appointment was imminent. Dupont confirmed it that afternoon, telling the Rhodesian Legislative Assembly that the mission had been accepted by Portugal.

=== Britain mobilises NATO support against Portugal; Lisbon insists it is neutral ===
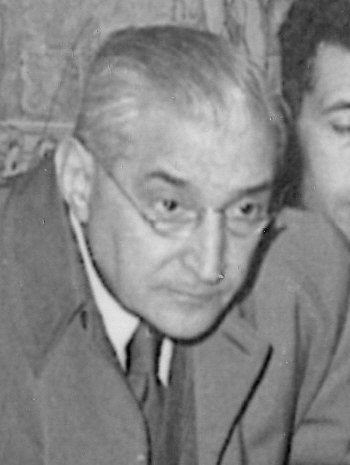
Portuguese Prime Minister António de Oliveira Salazar was a firm supporter of the Rhodesian government, but propagated a line of neutrality.

Meanwhile, Stewart and Ross argued with Nogueira and the Portuguese chargé d'affaires in London, José Manuel de Villas-Boas de Vasconcellos Faria. On 8 September, Nogueira said the Portuguese were accepting Reedman as a Rhodesian representative, but were not defining his status as they wished to remain neutral in what they regarded as an exclusively Anglo-Rhodesian problem. So far as he could see, Nogueira said, Portugal had done no harm to British interests. Stewart firmly told Nogueira that Britain expected Portugal to make a statement within 24 hours saying that it would not deal with Reedman while he remained off the British Embassy staff. Nogueira replied that his government was not going to accord official diplomatic recognition to Reedman, and that Dupont understood this. Ross now threatened to involve NATO if Portugal did not thoroughly explain its conduct. Unmoved, Nogueira said this surprised him; if the British were so keen to have Reedman on the staff at their embassy, he answered, that was down to them. Portugal was totally neutral in the affair, he insisted.

Britain vigorously rallied other NATO countries to take a stand against Portugal over Reedman. France warned that NATO pressure was unlikely to yield results in his matter, but Belgium's NATO representative, André de Staercke, agreed to challenge Salazar on 11 September. At his meeting with de Staercke, Salazar denied that Portugal was giving Rhodesia its own diplomatic representation, and said there had been some misunderstanding. Portugal would not obstruct Reedman's entry should he arrive, Salazar said, as he was travelling on a (Rhodesian-issued) British passport. On 14 September, Nogueira's ministry released a statement saying that if Britain challenged Portugal over Rhodesia at NATO, Lisbon would "use the greatest firmness to repel any attempt to attribute particular responsibilities or to make criticism of Portugal's position".

Britain raised the issue formally in the North Atlantic Council, NATO's most senior political governing body, the same day. Portugal's delegate, Vasco da Cunha, argued that given the standing existence of independent Rhodesian offices in Lourenço Marques, Pretoria and London, (Note: The London office da Cunha refers to here is the Rhodesian High Commission at Rhodesia House.) the matter was between Britain and Rhodesia, and not Portugal's business. Rhodesia had simply asked to have Reedman head a representative office in Lisbon, and he would not present a letter of accreditation. If Rhodesia had exaggerated this, da Cunha said, that was not Portugal's concern. The Italian, Belgian, Danish, French and U.S. delegates in turn sided with Britain, and collectively asked da Cunha to tell his government to publicly declare its non-acceptance of Reedman while he lacked British approval. Da Cunha refused, saying this would only irritate his compatriots "because of the neglect by their allies of their interests in the past". The meeting broke up without agreement. Whitehall was pleased with the pro-British sentiment displayed therein, while Lisbon remained unmoved.

== Appointment ==
=== Reedman arrives in Lisbon and receives Portuguese approval ===
The Necessidades Palace in Lisbon, the seat of Portugal's Ministry of Foreign Affairs, where Reedman presented his letter of accreditation to Nogueira

Having spent the previous week in London, Reedman flew into Lisbon Portela Airport on 15 September 1965. He was met there by the Portuguese Foreign Ministry's assistant chief of protocol, Luis Quartim Bastos, and three Rhodesian officials, who had arrived a fortnight before. Nobody from the British Embassy was present. Bastos told a reporter that he was at the airport on Nogueira's behalf to accord Reedman "the classic welcome for the arrival of heads of mission". Speaking the next day, Reedman appeared genial and optimistic. "We [Portugal and Rhodesia] have everything in common," he said, "including the will for survival, an awareness of the true situation overseas, and a greater feeling towards what we are doing."

Two days later, Dupont announced that he had issued a letter of accreditation to Reedman for presentation to Nogueira. The envoy would not present credentials, Dupont explained, as he was representing the Rhodesian government, and not its head of state, Queen Elizabeth II. The Deputy Prime Minister expressed confusion regarding the appointment's discussion at NATO, saying that Rhodesia was far outside the organisation's geographical area of responsibility. He said that the letter of accreditation would confer on Reedman the title of "Accredited Diplomatic Representative", and that Reedman would thereafter head the "Rhodesian Diplomatic Mission" in Lisbon, which would operate on the same level as the Rhodesian office in Pretoria. The Portuguese Foreign Ministry quickly issued a statement correcting Dupont's wording, saying that Reedman would lead the "Rhodesian Mission", with no reference to diplomatic status.

To Britain's alarm and indignation, the Portuguese government announced on 21 September that Nogueira had accepted "a letter of introduction" from Reedman, conferring upon him the title "Chief of the Rhodesian Mission", with powers to deal with the Portuguese Foreign Ministry in Luso-Rhodesian matters without British interference. This followed the precedent set by Reedman's counterpart in South Africa, the statement said. Speaking publicly in Salisbury the same evening, Dupont told reporters that there had never been any intention to claim ambassadorial status for Reedman, and that Rhodesia had constantly kept Britain informed of what was happening regarding the appointment. So far as he was concerned, he said, the Rhodesian government had achieved its objective of attaining an independent diplomatic representative in Portugal, and had not exceeded its mandate in any way while doing so. Britain protested strenuously, saying Portugal was going back on its word. Portugal insisted that its reception of Reedman and his Lisbon mission did not prejudice Britain's responsibility over Rhodesia, and was justified because of the long-standing ties between Portugal and Rhodesia, as well as their common involvement in many southern African issues.

=== Rhodesia initiates clandestine arms purchases ===
Reedman carried instructions from Salisbury to spend up to £3 million on European weapons, aircraft and equipment as soon as he could. The Rhodesian government now believed that it would almost certainly declare independence unilaterally and, knowing the purchase of materiel would be more difficult following this, wished to have the Rhodesian Security Forces' necessary ammunition, weapons, spare parts and other equipment in place beforehand. Soon after arriving in Portugal, Reedman contacted the Lisbon-based Zoio brothers, José, Luiz and Jean, who had recently supplied the Portuguese Armed Forces in Angola with British-made weapons in direct contravention of NATO's embargo against arming Portugal's African-based troops. The Zoios were interested in stocking Rhodesia's arsenal, and promptly agreed to arrange an order of weapons from a third party on Reedman's behalf in exchange for a letter of credit from the Rhodesian government.

Pretending their client was the government of Pakistan, the Zoio brothers contacted a licensed arms dealer from England, Major W R L Turp MBE of Bexley, Kent, who quickly agreed in principle, requesting a letter of credit from a Geneva bank and appropriate end-user certificates for the weapons. Meanwhile, Reedman's military attaché, Wing Commander John Mussell, travelled to Belgium to buy starter cartridges for the Rolls-Royce Avon 109 jet engines used by the Royal Rhodesian Air Force's English Electric Canberra bombers, as well as engines for Rhodesia's Hawker Hunter jet fighters, which were produced in Belgium under licence from Britain.

=== Reedman speaks on Portuguese state radio, 24 September ===
I have a mandate from the Rhodesian government to put our case for independence not only to the people of Portugal, in order to obtain your understanding and support of our just, urgent, and proper claims, but to all those people who are interested in the cause of justice ....

— Harry Reedman speaks on Emissora Nacional, 24 September 1965

On 24 September, Reedman appeared on Portugal's state-owned national radio station, Emissora Nacional de Radiodifusão, introducing himself as "the head of the Rhodesian diplomatic mission" to Portugal". He said the Afro-Asian element "made a mockery of the Commonwealth" and enabled Chinese-initiated communist encroachment into Africa. More than one Commonwealth member state hosted training facilities for black communist guerrillas, he said, which threatened all "civilised states in Africa". He dismissed one man, one vote as false "trash democracy", and said that in the present geopolitical climate countries run by black Africans inevitably destroyed themselves. "This your Rhodesian neighbour will not in any circumstances allow," he pledged. "We [Portugal and Rhodesia] stand together in a common cause because of civilisation."

Ross rebuked Nogueira for allowing the broadcast, saying its content was insidious and goading. Nogueira agreed that Reedman's words were provocative, but said Portugal could not be blamed as it did not censor public broadcasts. Britain considered withdrawing Ross in protest, but its Foreign Office ruled this out, saying Britain could not afford to be without an ambassador in Lisbon to influence Portugal's actions in the event of UDI. British Cabinet Secretary Burke Trend rejected this view, pointing to Lisbon's conduct regarding Reedman, which he said showed the Portuguese "ha[d] very clearly made up their minds" to support a Rhodesian UDI. The British ambassador would not be able to affect matters, he surmised, and British interests would be better served by immediately taking a firm hand against Portugal, in the hope that this would send a strong message to Rhodesia. Ross then protested to the Portuguese about Reedman's calling himself "head of the Rhodesian diplomatic mission" on the radio; Lisbon replied impassively that this was a private expression of views by Reedman, and not Portugal's responsibility.

== Independence ==
=== Final steps to UDI ===
While the British remained firmly against separate Rhodesian representation in Lisbon, there was little they could do to stop it. Ross was nominally put on extended leave, but not withdrawn. Deciding that he could no longer wait for Bottomley to fulfil his promise to visit Rhodesia during October, Smith resolved to instead meet with Wilson personally in London, and arranged to travel on 3 October, arriving the next day. While Smith prepared to travel, Britain continued its frantic efforts to carry international anti-Rhodesian sentiment, among other things urging each NATO member government not to deal with Reedman. In London, Britons who sympathised with Smith came out to support him in large numbers, surprising both the British and the Rhodesians. The two Prime Ministers' talks were largely unproductive, and little common ground was found before Smith flew home on 12 October.

Two weeks later, Wilson travelled to Salisbury to continue the talks. The British Prime Minister proposed that future black representation in the Rhodesian parliament might be safeguarded by the revocation of some of Salisbury's self-governing powers, held since 1923. This was a horrific prospect in the eyes of his Rhodesian opponents, and proved the final straw for Smith's government. The Unilateral Declaration of Independence was signed by the Rhodesian Cabinet on 11 November 1965, to almost unanimous international acrimony. The next day the United Nations Security Council passed Resolution 216, which condemned the declaration as an illegal one "made by a racist minority", and called on all member states to withhold diplomatic recognition. Wilson responded to the UDI by withdrawing the British exequatur from the Rhodesian mission in Lisbon, though its operations were uninterrupted by the change.

=== Portugal's role in Rhodesian sanction-busting ===
Smith was confident that the British military would never agree to engage in what he said would be a "fratricidal war" against Rhodesia; he was proven correct when a British Ministry of Defence council, convened by Wilson and headed by Denis Healey, Secretary of State for Defence, determined such intervention "impossible", citing various logistical problems, the danger of provoking a pre-emptive Rhodesian attack on Zambia, and the psychological issues that would surely accompany any confrontation between British and Rhodesian troops. Wilson therefore put all his eggs in the sanctions basket, predicting in January 1966 that the embargo would bring Rhodesia to its knees "within a matter of weeks rather than months". The UN embargo proved ineffective, largely because both Portugal and South Africa refused to participate. Both declared themselves neutral in the Rhodesian affair, and continued to supply Rhodesia with vital resources such as oil, both at a governmental level and privately. Portugal provided the seaports of Mozambique and the oil refinery at Lourenço Marques. Car stickers marked "obrigado moçambique"—"Thank You Mozambique"—quickly became popular with white Rhodesian motorists.

Clandestine trade with other nations continued, initially at a reduced level; among other things, Portugal illicitly labelled unsold Rhodesian tobacco as Mozambican product, then sold it on Salisbury's behalf in Europe and Asia. Through this and a series of similar sanction-busting operations Rhodesia avoided the economic cataclysm predicted by Wilson, and, with the help of South Africa and Portugal, gradually became more self-sufficient. Aiming to directly cut off the main supply lines of oil to Rhodesia, namely the Portuguese Mozambican ports at Beira and Lourenço Marques, Wilson set up the Beira Patrol, a Royal Navy squadron based in the Mozambique Channel, in March 1966. This blockade was endorsed the following month by UN Security Council Resolution 221. Too small to cover both Beira and Lourenço Marques, and unable to legally fire on tankers once they were in Portuguese waters, the patrol met with little success, but it endured regardless for nearly a decade. (Note: Despite the patrol's futility—it intercepted only 47 tankers in its first five years, of which 42 were allowed to go on—Britain retained it, gradually reducing it in size, until 1975, when Mozambique became independent and pledged not to transship oil to Rhodesia.)

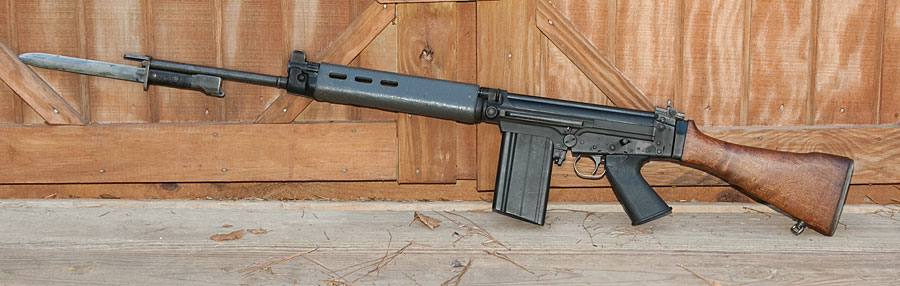
The Belgian FN FAL battle rifle was one of Rhodesia's primary small arms during the Bush War.

The Zoios' clandestine transaction with Turp initially progressed well, but fell apart in March 1966, when Turp discovered he would actually be arming Rhodesia rather than Pakistan, reacted with alarm and informed the British government. The British Board of Trade tightened its control over arms transactions, and encouraged its NATO counterparts to do the same, while the Zoios turned their attention to Belgian, Italian and West German arms dealers. In October 1966, a huge consignment of army and air force equipment arrived in Rhodesia from the seaports of Mozambique, with many of the containers bearing metropolitan Portuguese markings. Prominent among the European weapons were FN FAL battle rifles from Belgium, which allowed an unofficial Rhodesian trade delegation to operate quietly in spite of the sanctions.

=== Carnation Revolution and closure of mission ===
Despite the mission having been successfully established in Lisbon, Reedman struggled to gain outside recognition as a diplomat, and publicly complained that only the South African representative in Portugal treated him as such. In early 1968 he cancelled his membership with the Lisbon Club, which refused to excuse his nondiplomatic fee. By February he prohibited his staff from speaking with non-Portuguese journalists. He publicly declared that the mission was a waste of money, and by May the Rhodesian government decided to replace him. Rhodesia's Lisbon mission remained open throughout the late 1960s and early 1970s, providing a key link between the Rhodesian and Portuguese governments, which remained close. When Rhodesia adopted a republican constitution in 1970, Portugal bowed to British diplomatic pressure and withdrew its consul-general, João de Freitas Cruz, from Salisbury, but the Rhodesian office in Lisbon remained open. With the Carnation Revolution of 1974, Portugal's African policy was suddenly reversed. By contrast to the former authoritarian government, which had been committed to a pluricontinental Portugal, fighting costly wars against independence movements in its African territories to maintain it, the new leftist administration rapidly initiated moves to withdraw from Africa as quickly as possible. Following hurried negotiations between Portugal and the nationalist guerrillas in each territory, both Mozambique and Angola became independent under communist governments in 1975. Lisbon's stance on Rhodesia altered accordingly. The Portuguese government ordered the closure of the Rhodesian mission in April 1975, and simultaneously withdrew its own remaining officials from Rhodesia. The Rhodesian mission in Lisbon formally closed on 1 May 1975.

== See also ==
- Rhodesia Information Centre, a similar office in Sydney, Australia

== Notes and references ==
=== Newspaper and journal articles ===
- Lord Brockway (1 October 1965). "Crisis Over Rhodesia". Tribune. London.
- Harris, P. B. (September 1969). "The Rhodesian Referendum: June 20th, 1969". Parliamentary Affairs. 23 (1969sep). Oxford: Oxford University Press: 72–80. doi:10.1093/parlij/23.1969sep.72.
- Mobley, Richard (Winter 2002). "The Beira patrol: Britain's broken blockade against Rhodesia". Naval War College Review. LV (1). Newport, Rhode Island: Naval War College: 63–84. Archived from the original on 14 September 2014.
- Lord Saint Brides (April 1980). "The Lessons of Zimbabwe-Rhodesia". International Security. 4 (4). Cambridge, Massachusetts: The MIT Press: 177–184. doi:10.2307/2626673. JSTOR 2626673.
- "Britain 'Gets Tough': Warns Rhodesia Of 'Rebellion' Consequences". The Sydney Morning Herald. 28 October 1964. p. 3. Archived from the original on 4 February 2016.
- "A 'Classic Welcome' for Reedman". The Herald. Glasgow. 16 September 1965. p. 9. Archived from the original on 27 July 2016.
- "Rhodesia's Man in Lisbon: Objective Said To Be Achieved". The Herald. Glasgow. 22 September 1965. p. 9. Archived from the original on 27 July 2016.
- "Rhodesian Representative Broadcasts to Portugal". The Herald. Glasgow. Reuters. 25 September 1965. p. 7. Archived from the original on 27 July 2016.
- "Portugal Cuts Rhodesia Tie". St Petersburg Times. 27 April 1970. p. 3–A. Archived from the original on 27 July 2016.
- "Rhodesians to quit Lisbon". The Herald. Glasgow. 1 May 1975. p. 4. Archived from the original on 27 July 2016.

=== Online sources ===
- Lord Brockway; Lord Taylor (26 July 1965). "Rhodesian diplomatic representation at Lisbon". Parliamentary Debates (Hansard). London: House of Lords. Archived from the original on 26 March 2016.
- "UN Security Council, Resolution 216 (1965) of 12 November 1965". New York: UN Security Council. 12 November 1965. UN Document S/RES/216 (1965). Archived from the original on 27 July 2016.

=== Bibliography ===
- Anglin, Douglas G. (1994). Zambian Crisis Behaviour : Confronting Rhodesia's Unilateral Declaration of Independence, 1965-1966. McGill-Queen's University Press. ISBN 9780773512191.
- Berlyn, Phillippa (April 1978). The Quiet Man: A Biography of the Hon. Ian Douglas Smith. Salisbury: M O Collins. OCLC 4282978. also includes (on pp. 240–256) Rowland, J Reid, Constitutional History of Rhodesia: An outline
- Blake, Robert (1977). A History of Rhodesia (First ed.). London: Eyre Methuen. ISBN 9780413283504.
- Brownell, Josiah (2021). Struggles for Self-Determination: The Denial of Reactionary Statehood in Africa. Cambridge University Press. ISBN 9781108832649.
- Cilliers, Jakkie (December 1984). Counter-Insurgency in Rhodesia. London, Sydney & Dover, New Hampshire: Croom Helm. ISBN 978-0-7099-3412-7.
- Duignan, Peter; Gann, Lewis H (1994). Communism in Sub-Saharan Africa: a Reappraisal. Stanford, California: Hoover Press. ISBN 978-0-8179-3712-6.
- Fedorowich, Kent; Thomas, Martin, eds. (2001). International Diplomacy and Colonial Retreat. London: Frank Cass. ISBN 978-0-7146-5063-0.
- Gale, William Daniel (1973). The years between 1923 and 1973: half a century of responsible government in Rhodesia. Salisbury: H. C. P. Andersen. OCLC 874470.
- Jackson, Robert H (1990). Quasi-States: Sovereignty, International Relations and the Third World. Cambridge, England: Cambridge University Press. ISBN 0-521-44783-6.
- Kapungu, Leonard T (1973). The United Nations and Economic Sanctions Against Rhodesia. Lexington, Massachusetts: Lexington Books. ISBN 978-0-669-86462-5.
- Martin, David; Johnson, Phyllis (July 1981). The Struggle for Zimbabwe (First ed.). London: Faber and Faber. ISBN 978-0-571-11066-7.
- Mazrui, Ali Al'Amin, ed. (1993). General History of Africa, VIII: Africa Since 1935 (First ed.). Paris: United Nations Educational, Scientific and Cultural Organization. ISBN 92-3-102758-1.
- Meredith, Martin (1984). The First Dance of Freedom: Black Africa in the postwar era. New York: Harper & Row. ISBN 978-0-06-430150-3.
- Moorcraft, Paul L; McLaughlin, Peter (April 2008) [1982]. The Rhodesian War: A Military History. Barnsley: Pen and Sword Books. ISBN 978-1-84415-694-8.
- Naylor, R T (1999). Patriots and Profiteers: On Economic Warfare, Embargo Busting and State-Sponsored Crime. Toronto: McClelland & Stewart. ISBN 0-7710-6739-9.
- Palley, Claire (1966). The Constitutional History and Law of Southern Rhodesia 1888–1965, with Special Reference to Imperial Control. Oxford: Clarendon Press. OCLC 406157.
- Petter-Bowyer, P J H (November 2005) [2003]. Winds of Destruction: the Autobiography of a Rhodesian Combat Pilot. Johannesburg: 30° South Publishers. ISBN 978-0-9584890-3-4.
- Schwarz, Bill (2011). The White Man's World (First ed.). Oxford: Oxford University Press. ISBN 978-0-19-929691-0.
- Smith, Ian (June 1997). The Great Betrayal: The Memoirs of Ian Douglas Smith. London: John Blake Publishing. ISBN 1-85782-176-9.
- Welensky, Roy (1964). Welensky's 4000 Days. London: Collins.
- Wessels, Hannes (July 2010). P K van der Byl: African Statesman. Johannesburg: 30° South Publishers. ISBN 978-1-920143-49-7.
- Windrich, Elaine (1978). Britain and the Politics of Rhodesian Independence. London, Sydney & Dover, New Hampshire: Croom Helm. ISBN 0-85664-709-8.
- Wood, J R T (June 2005). So far and no further! Rhodesia's bid for independence during the retreat from empire 1959–1965. Victoria, British Columbia: Trafford Publishing. ISBN 978-1-4120-4952-8.
- Wood, J R T (April 2008). A matter of weeks rather than months: The Impasse between Harold Wilson and Ian Smith: Sanctions, Aborted Settlements and War 1965–1969. Victoria, British Columbia: Trafford Publishing. ISBN 978-1-4251-4807-2.
- "Arab Observer". No. 315–326. Cairo. 1966.
