= Dick Hall (writer) =

Australian writer

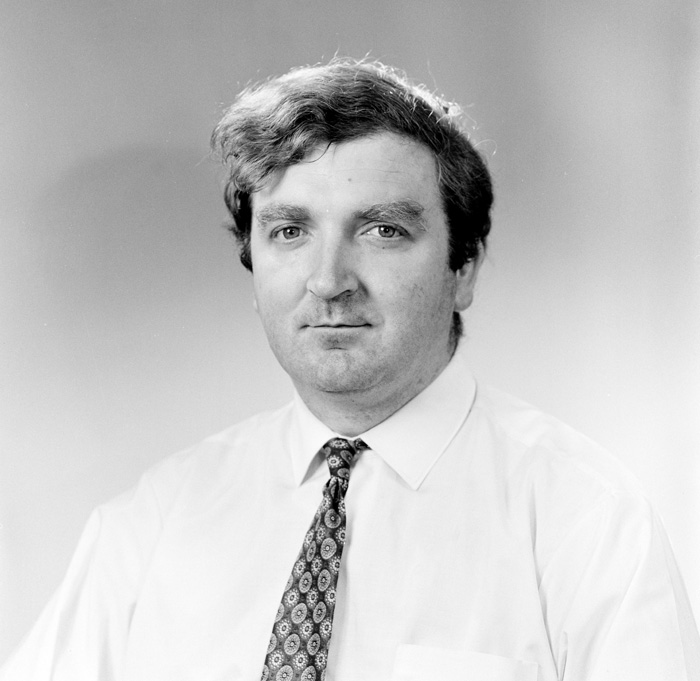
- Hall in 1969
- Born: 9 October 1937
- Died: 22 March 2003 (aged 65); Sydney

Richard Victor Hall (9 October 1937 – 22 March 2003) was an Australian writer.

Hall attended St Aloysius' College and then studied at the University of Sydney. He worked as a journalist and with Freedom from Hunger before becoming a secretary to Labor Party leader Gough Whitlam. Following the Labor Party's victory at the 1972 federal election, he became an advisor in Aboriginal Affairs and then in Secondary Industry. In 1973, he was a founding member of the Literature Board of the Australia Council. While serving on the Board, he was involved in the Public Lending Right scheme.

In 1976, Neville Wran, the Premier of New South Wales, appointed Hall to the Cultural Affairs Advisory Body, where Hall and Donald Horne founded the New South Wales Premier's Literary Awards. He also served on the New South Wales State Library Council, and was president from 1980 to 1984. Hall also ghost-wrote two books, for Labor politicians Jack Hallam and Mick Young, and also wrote biographies, political non-fiction, and two crime thrillers. In 1994, he won the first James Joyce Foundation Fellowship and consequently spent time at Trinity College, Dublin. In his later years, he also worked as an advisor for Wayne Swan.

Hall died after a long illness in 2003.

== Bibliography ==
=== Books written by Richard Hall ===
- O'Leary: A Two Act Play, 1962
- The Makers and the Breakers: The Governor-General and the Senate Vs the Constitution, Sydney and Auckland, Wellington Lane Press, 1976. Joint author: John Iremonger.
- The Real John Kerr: His Brilliant Career, Sydney: Angus and Robertson, 1978
- The Secret State: Australia's Spy Industry, Sydney: Cassell, 1978
- Greed, Sydney: Pan Books, 1981
- Costello, Sydney: Collins, 1989
- Noumea, North Ryde: Angus and Robertson, 1990
- The Rhodes Scholar Spy, Sydney: Random House, 1991
- Tiger General: The Killing of Victor Chang, Sydney: Pan Macmillan Australia, 1995

=== Books edited by Richard Hall ===
- Banjo Paterson: His Poetry and Prose, St Leonards: Allen and Unwin, 1993
- Backroom Briefings: John Curtin's War, Canberra: National Library of Australia, 1997. Joint editor: Clem Lloyd.
- Sydney : An Oxford Anthology, Melbourne: Oxford University Press, 2000
