= Cabinet of Rhodesia =

This list includes ministers of the cabinet of Rhodesia from 11 November 1965, the date of Rhodesia's Unilateral Declaration of Independence, to 1979. It includes ministers of Rhodesia's transitional government, which began following the 1978 Internal Settlement and ended with the establishment of Zimbabwe Rhodesia on 1 June 1979. The internal transitional government included the creation of a four-person "Executive Council" and the appointment of black co-ministers to cabinet portfolios.

== Cabinet ==
Cabinet of Rhodesia, 1965−1979
Office	Name	Term	Ref.
President	Clifford Dupont	1970−1975	
President	Henry Everard (acting)	1975−1976	
President	John Wrathall	1976−1978	
President	Henry Everard (acting)	1978	
President	Jack Pithey (acting)	1978−1979	
President	Henry Everard (acting)	1979	
Prime Minister	Ian Smith	1965−1979	
Deputy Prime Minister	Clifford Dupont	1965	
Deputy Prime Minister	John Wrathall	1966−1976	
Deputy Prime Minister	David Smith	1976−1979	
Officer Administrating the Government	Clifford Dupont	1965−1970	
Executive Council	Ian Smith; Abel Muzorewa; Ndabaningi Sithole; Jeremiah Chirau	1978−1979; 1978−1979; 1978−1979; 1978−1979	
Minister of Agriculture	The 7th Duke of Montrose; George Rudland; David Smith; Rollo Hayman; Mark Partridge; Joel Mandaza*	1965−1966; 1966−1968; 1968−1976; 1976−1977; 1977−1979; 1978−1979	
Minister of Combined Operations	Roger Hawkins; John Kadzviti*; Hilary Squires	1977−1979; 1978−1979; 1979	
Minister of Commerce and Industry	George Rudland; Jack Mussett; Elias Broomberg; Desmond Lardner-Burke; David Smith; Ernest Bulle*	1965−1966; 1966−1974; 1974−1976; 1976−1978; 1978−1979; 1978−1979	
Minister of Defence	Clifford Dupont; The 7th Duke of Montrose; Jack Howman; P. K. van der Byl; Reginald Cowper; Mark Partridge; Roger Hawkins; John Kadzviti*	1965−1966; 1966−1968; 1968−1974; 1974−1976; 1976−1977; 1977; 1977−1979; 1978−1979	
Minister of Education	Arthur Philip Smith; Denis Walker; Rowan Cronjé; Gibson Magaramombe*	1965−1977; 1977−1978; 1978−1979; 1978−1979	
Minister of Finance	John Wrathall; David Smith; Ernest Bulle*	1965−1976; 1976−1979; 1978−1979	
Minister of Foreign Affairs	Clifford Dupont; The 7th Duke of Montrose; Jack Howman; P. K. van der Byl; Elliot Gabellah*	1965−1966; 1966−1968; 1968−1974; 1974−1979; 1978−1979	
Minister of Health	Ian Finlay McLean; Rowan Cronjé; Gibson Magaramombe*	1965−1966; 1966−1979; 1978−1979	
Minister of Information, Immigration, and Tourism	Jack Howman; P. K. van der Byl; Wickus de Kock; Elias Broomberg; P. K. van der Byl; Elliot Gabellah*	1965−1968; 1968−1974; 1974−1975; 1976−1977; 1977−1979; 1978−1979	
Minister of Internal Affairs	William Harper; Lance Smith; Jack Mussett; Rollo Hayman; Byron Hove*; Kayisa Ndiweni*; Denis Walker	1965−1968; 1968−1974; 1974−1977; 1977−1978; 1978; 1978−1979; 1979	
Minister of Justice and Law and Order	Desmond Lardner-Burke; Hilary Squires; Byron Hove*; Francis Zindonga*	1965−1976; 1976−1979; 1978; 1978−1979	
Minister of Labour and Social Welfare	Ian Finlay McLean; Rowan Cronjé	1965−1966; 1966−1977	
Minister of Lands	Phillip van Heerden; Mark Partridge; Arthur Philip Smith; Jack Mussett; Aaron Mgutshini*	1965−1973; 1973−1977; 1977; 1977−1979; 1978−1979	
Minister of Local Government and Housing	Jack Mussett; Mark Partridge; William Irvine; Rollo Hayman; William Irvine; Kayisa Ndiweni*; James Chikerema*; Denis Walker	1965−1966; 1966−1973; 1973−1977; 1977−1978; 1978−1979; 1978; 1978−1979; 1979	
Minister of Manpower and Social Affairs	Rowan Cronjé; Gibson Magaramombe*	1977−1979; 1978−1979	
Minister of Mines	Phillip van Heerden; Ian Dillon; Jack Mussett; William Irvine; James Chikerema*	1965−1969; 1969−1977; 1977−1978; 1978−1979; 1978−1979	
Minister of Natural Resources	The 7th Duke of Montrose; Phillip van Heerden; Mark Partridge; Arthur Philip Smith; Jack Mussett; Aaron Mgutshini*	1965−1966; 1966−1973; 1973−1977; 1977; 1977−1979; 1978−1979	
Minister of Posts	John Wrathall; Roger Hawkins; Archibald Wilson; William Irvine; James Chikerema*	1965−1973; 1973−1977; 1977−1978; 1978−1979; 1978−1979	
Minister of Public Service	William Harper; Jack Howman; Reginald Cowper; P. K. van der Byl; Hilary Squires; Byron Hove*; Francis Zindonga*	1965−1968; 1968−1975; 1975−1976; 1976−1978; 1978−1979; 1978; 1978−1979	
Minister of Roads and Road Traffic	George Rudland; Andrew Dunlop; Roger Hawkins; Archibald Wilson; William Irvine; James Chikerema*	1965−1966; 1966−1970; 1970−1977; 1977−1978; 1978−1979; 1978−1979	
Minister of Transport and Power	George Rudland; Andrew Dunlop; Roger Hawkins; Archibald Wilson; William Irvine; James Chikerema*	1965−1966; 1966−1970; 1970−1977; 1977−1978; 1978−1979; 1978−1979	
Minister of Water Development	Phillip van Heerden; Mark Partridge; Jack Mussett; Aaron Mgutshini*	1965−1973; 1973−1977; 1977−1979; 1978−1979	
Minister of Development for Mashonaland	Jeremiah Chirau; Tafirenyika Mangwende	1976−1978; 1976−1978	
Minister of Development for Matabeleland	Zefania Charumbira; Kayisa Ndiweni	1976−1978; 1976−1978	
Minister without Portfolio	Andrew Dunlop; Lance Smith; George Rudland; Phillip van Heerden	1965; 1965; 1968−c.1972 1973−c.1977	
*Co-ministers. As part of the 1978 Internal Settlement, blacks were appointed as co-ministers to cabinet positions in Rhodesia's transitional government.

== See also ==
- Signatories of Rhodesia's Unilateral Declaration of Independence
- Government of Zimbabwe Rhodesia
- Politics of Zimbabwe
