= Mark Partridge =

Zimbabwean/Rhodesian MP

The Honourable Mark Partridge GLM
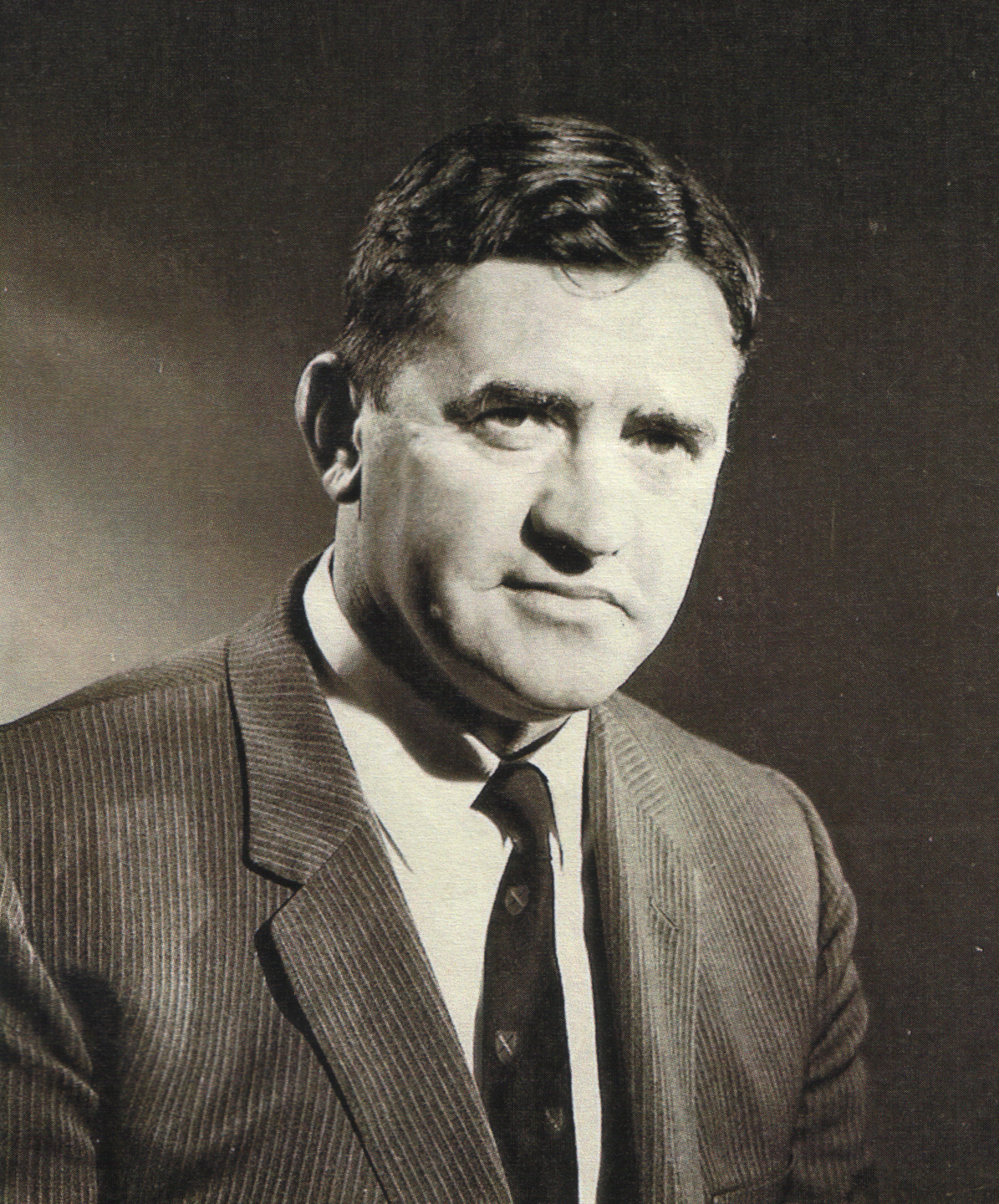

Minister of Lands and Natural Resources
- In office 1973 – 10 March 1977
- Prime Minister: Ian Smith
- Preceded by: Phillip van Heerden
- Succeeded by: Arthur Philip Smith

Personal details
- Born: 23 November 1922 States Mines, East Rand, Transvaal, South Africa
- Died: 13 December 2007 (aged 85) Harare, Zimbabwe
- Party: Rhodesian Front; Conservative Alliance of Zimbabwe
- Spouse: Barbara Black
- Civilian awards: Legion of Merit GLM

Military service
- Allegiance: United Kingdom
- Branch/service: British Army
- Years of service: 1940–1945
- Unit: King's Royal Rifle Corps
- Battles/wars: World War II
- Military awards: Unknown

Mark Henry Heathcote Partridge GLM (23 November 1922 – 13 December 2007) was a Rhodesian politician who served as the minister of Lands and Natural Resources and Defence.

== Early life ==
Partridge was born on 23 November 1922, at States Mines, East Rand, Transvaal, in South Africa. A year later his family moved to Salisbury in Southern Rhodesia, and Patridge was later educated at St. George's College. He enlisted in the King’s Royal Rifle Corps in 1940, seeing service in the Mediterranean theatre. In 1944 he received a temporary commission as an officer in the KRRC. Following demobilisation in 1945, Partridge became a company director.

== Political career ==
After joining the Rhodesian Front party, Partridge stood as the RF candidate for the Southern Rhodesian Legislative Assembly seat of Greendale in the December 1962 assembly election. He subsequently gained 55% of the vote, defeating Herbert Jack Quinton of the United Federal Party. He was re-elected for Greendale in 1965 and at the House of Assembly elections in 1970 (72%), 1974 (70.2%) and 1977 (79.3%).

In 1966 he was made Minister of Local Government and Housing by Prime Minister Ian Smith, and was made Minister of Lands and Natural Resources in May 1973. On 10 March 1977, he was briefly appointed as Minister of Defence, before being appointed as Minister of Agriculture and Water Development until the end of Rhodesia on 1 June 1979. In the only election for the House of Assembly of Zimbabwe Rhodesia held in April 1979, Partridge was elected unopposed as the member for Highlands but did not hold office in the government.

Following Zimbabwe's formal independence and first elections in 1980, Partridge was elected to the indirectly-elected Senate of Zimbabwe. With the Rhodesian Front becoming the Conservative Alliance of Zimbabwe from 1984, he moved from the Senate to the House of Assembly from the 1985 election as the MP for Mazowe-Mutoko, serving until the abolition of the White roll seats in 1987.

== Awards ==
- Legion of Merit (Grand Officer - Civilian) (GLM)

Southern Rhodesian Legislative Assembly
Preceded by Ahrn Palley	Member of Parliament for Greendale; 1962 – 1970	Assembly dissolved
House of Assembly of Rhodesia
New constituency	Member of Parliament for Greendale; 1970 – 1979	Assembly dissolved
Political offices
Preceded by Jack Mussett	Minister of Local Government and Housing; 1966 – 1973	Succeeded by William Irvine
Preceded by Phillip van Heerden	Minister of Lands and Natural Resources; 1973 – 1977	Succeeded by Arthur Philip Smith
Preceded by Reginald Cowper	Minister of Defence; 1977	Succeeded by Roger Hawkins
Preceded by Rollo Hayman	Minister of Agriculture; 1977 – 1979; Served alongside: Joel Mandaza (1978–79)	Rhodesia dissolved
Preceded by Jack Mussett	Minister of Water Development; 1977 – 1979; Served alongside: Aaron Mgutshini (1978–79)	Rhodesia dissolved
Parliament of Zimbabwe Rhodesia
New title	Member of Parliament for Highlands; 1979	Parliament dissolved
Parliament of Zimbabwe
Preceded by André Sothern Holland	Member of Parliament for Mazowe-Mutoko; 1985 – 1987	White roll abolished
