= Rollo Hayman =

Zimbabwean politician

Minister of Internal Affairs of Rhodesia
- In office 1977 – 27 December 1978
- Prime Minister: Ian Smith
- Co-Minister: Byron Hove; Kayisa Ndiweni
- Preceded by: Jack Mussett
- Succeeded by: Denis Walker

Minister of Local Government and Housing of Rhodesia
- In office 1977 – 27 December 1978
- Prime Minister: Ian Smith
- Co-Minister: Kayisa Ndiweni; James Chikerema
- Preceded by: William Irvine
- Succeeded by: William Irvine

Minister of Agriculture of Rhodesia
- In office 1976–1977
- Prime Minister: Ian Smith
- Preceded by: David Colville Smith
- Succeeded by: Mark Partridge

Deputy Minister of Internal Affairs
- In office 1973–1976
- Prime Minister: Ian Smith
- Minister: Lance Smith; Jack Mussett

Member of Parliament of Rhodesia for Mazoe
- In office 1962 – 27 December 1978
- Preceded by: Neil Patrick Hammond
- Succeeded by: Cecil Millar

Personal details
- Born: 4 May 1925 Banbury, Oxfordshire, United Kingdom
- Died: 3 April 2008 (aged 82) Howick, KwaZulu-Natal, South Africa
- Party: United Federal Party (until 1961); Rhodesian Front (1962–1978); Independent (after 1978)
- Spouse: Madeline Elizabeth Hayman
- Children: 2
- Parent(s): Samuel James Rollo Hayman; Ethel Burnell Pollard
- Education: University of the Witwatersrand (BS)

Military service
- Branch/service: Royal Air Force
- Years of service: 1943–1949
- Rank: Flight sergeant
- Unit: Transport Command
- Battles/wars: World War II

George Rollo Hayman (4 May 1925 – 3 April 2008) was a Rhodesian farmer and politician. A member of the House of Assembly, he served in several portfolios as a member of the Cabinet of Rhodesia under Prime Minister Ian Smith. Born in the United Kingdom, he moved to Southern Rhodesia at age four and served as a Royal Air Force pilot in World War II.

Elected to Parliament in 1958 as a member of the United Federal Party, he was a founding member of the Rhodesian Front party in 1962. He joined the Cabinet in 1976 upon being appointed Minister of Agriculture. In 1977, he was named Minister of Local Government and Housing and Minister of Internal Affairs. In December 1978, he resigned from the Cabinet, from Parliament, and from the party, in protest at the Prime Minister's rejection of British-American plans for Rhodesia's transition to majority rule. He ran as an independent in the by-election for his former seat in Parliament, but lost. He soon moved to South Africa, where he lived until his death.

== Early life and education ==
Hayman was born on 4 May 1925 to Samuel James Rollo Hayman and Ethel Elizabeth Burnell Pollard. Born in Banbury, Oxfordshire, United Kingdom, he moved to Southern Rhodesia with his parents in 1929, when he was age four. He was educated at Plumtree School in Plumtree, Matabeleland. He matriculated at the University of the Witwatersrand in Johannesburg, South Africa, graduating honors with a Bachelor of Science in soil conservation.

In 1943, he joined the Royal Air Force as a flight sergeant. He served during World War II as a pilot with the Transport Command in Burma.

== Farming career ==
Hayman returned to Southern Rhodesia in 1949, taking up work as a conservation and extension officer until 1955. He later purchased land and took up farming in Shamva, a town in the northern Mashonaland region. He went on to serve as chairman of the Shamva Farmers' Association, chairman of the Shamva Parents' Association, and director of the Rhodesian Farmers' Syndicates.

== Political career ==
Hayman was elected to Parliament for the Shamva constituency in the 1958 Southern Rhodesian elections, as a member of the United Federal Party. He, along with Ian Smith, Lance Smith, and four others, resigned from the UFP on 19 April 1961 over the party's position on constitutional proposals for Southern Rhodesia.

In 1962, he became a founding member of the right-wing Rhodesian Front party, which opposed transitioning Southern Rhodesia to independence under black majority rule. Hayman ran for reelection as the Rhodesian Front candidate for the Mazoe constituency in the 1962 elections. He won with 56% of the vote, defeating the United Federal Party candidate Neil Patrick Hammond. At a 2 December 1962 meeting, the Rhodesian Front parliamentary caucus met and returned a vote of no confidence in Prime Minister Winston Field. Hayman was one of only two RF members to vote against the motion, alongside Jack Howman.

Hayman won reelection in 1965, 1970, 1974, and 1977, each time with more than 80% of the vote. In 1973, he was appointed Deputy Minister of Internal Affairs. He joined Prime Minister Ian Smith's Cabinet in 1976 when he was named Minister of Agriculture. In 1977, he became minister of two portfolios, Local Government and Housing and Internal Affairs. In those offices, he served alongside black co-ministers appointed as a result of the 1978 Internal Settlement. Hayman's co-Minister of Local Government and Housing was Kayisa Ndiweni, followed by James Chikerema. For Internal Affairs, the co-minister was Byron Hove, followed by Kayisa Ndiweni.

=== Resignation and special election ===
On 27 December 1978, Hayman resigned from his cabinet posts, from Parliament, and from the Rhodesian Front. He charged that Prime Minister Ian Smith was "leading Rhodesians into a trap" by rejecting Western plans for majority rule. Hayman favored the plan put forward by the United States and United Kingdom in which Rhodesia would revert to British rule under a commissioner, assisted by United Nations peacekeepers, who would oversee elections and the transition to black rule. He thought that any black government elected under Smith's plan, in which 28% of the government was to be reserved for whites, would collapse or be overthrown by guerrillas, resulting in Marxist rule in Rhodesia. In a political meeting in Enkeldoorn, Hayman also argued that Smith was misleading the country by claiming that Rhodesia had a good change of gaining international recognition following the elections. Additionally, he thought it would be impossible to organize the elections by December 31, the date stipulated by the Internal Settlement.

The resignation of Hayman, a staunch conservative and a close ally of the Prime Minister, was seen as a blow to the transitional government. Prime Minister Ian Smith later said that he had asked Hayman to resign when he learned he was planning to leave Rhodesia. He said:

"Therefore I informed him that it would be right and proper for him to resign from his ministerial post. From experience, I have found in some cases—and I stress the word some—when people have made up their minds to leave Rhodesia, they adopt an unbalanced and defeatist attitude and therefore it would have been wrong for Mr. Hayman to continue in public office."

— Ian Smith

The day he resigned, Hayman announced that he would run as an independent for his former seat in Parliament in the special election. The byelection, held on 6 February 1979, was the last election conducted before the advent of the new constitution. Hayman lost the election with 20% of the vote to Cecil Millar, the Rhodesian Front candidate. Soon after, he moved to South Africa.

== Personal life and death ==
Hayman died, aged 82, on 3 April 2008 at home in the Amberglen retirement community in Howick, KwaZulu-Natal, South Africa. He was married to Madeline Elizabeth, with two children, one son and one daughter. He played tennis and golf.

== Electoral history ==
1958 Southern Rhodesian general election: Shamva
Party	Candidate	Votes	%	±%
United Party	Rollo Hayman	N/A	N/A	
	N/A	N/A	N/A	
Majority		N/A		
Turnout		N/A		

1962 Southern Rhodesian general election: Mazoe
Party	Candidate	Votes	%	±%
RF	George Rollo Hayman	972	55.8	
United Party	Neil Patrick Hammond	771	44.2	
Majority		201	11.6	
Turnout		1,743	69.3	

1965 Rhodesian general election: Mazoe
Party	Candidate	Votes	%	±%
RF	Rollo Hayman	N/A	N/A	
	N/A	N/A	N/A	
Majority		N/A	N/A	
Turnout		N/A	N/A	

1970 Rhodesian general election: Mazoe
Party	Candidate	Votes	%	±%
RF	Rollo Hayman	1,075	87.2	
Independent	Ernest Frederick Konschel	158	12.8	
Majority		978	74.4	
Turnout		1,233	75.0	

1974 Rhodesian general election: Mazoe
Party	Candidate	Votes	%	±%
RF	Rollo Hayman	1,241	84.4	−2.8
Rhodesia Party	Henry John Wells	229	15.6	
Majority		1,012	68.8	−5.6
Turnout		1,470	92.5	+17.5

1977 Rhodesian general election: Mazoe
Party	Candidate	Votes	%	±%
RF	Rollo Hayman	1,184	89.1	+4.7
RAP	Robin Elliot Campbell-Logan	145	10.9	
Majority		1,039	78.2	+9.4
Turnout		1,329	80.4	−12.1

By-election, 1979: Mazoe
Party	Candidate	Votes	%	±%
RF	Cecil Millar	611	78.7	−10.4
Independent	Rollo Hayman	165	21.3	
Majority		446	57.4	−20.8
Turnout		776	N/A	N/A

== See also ==
- List of Royal Air Force personnel
