= David Smith (Rhodesian politician) =

Rhodesian/Zimbabwean politician (1922–1996)

The Honourable David Smith GLM ICD
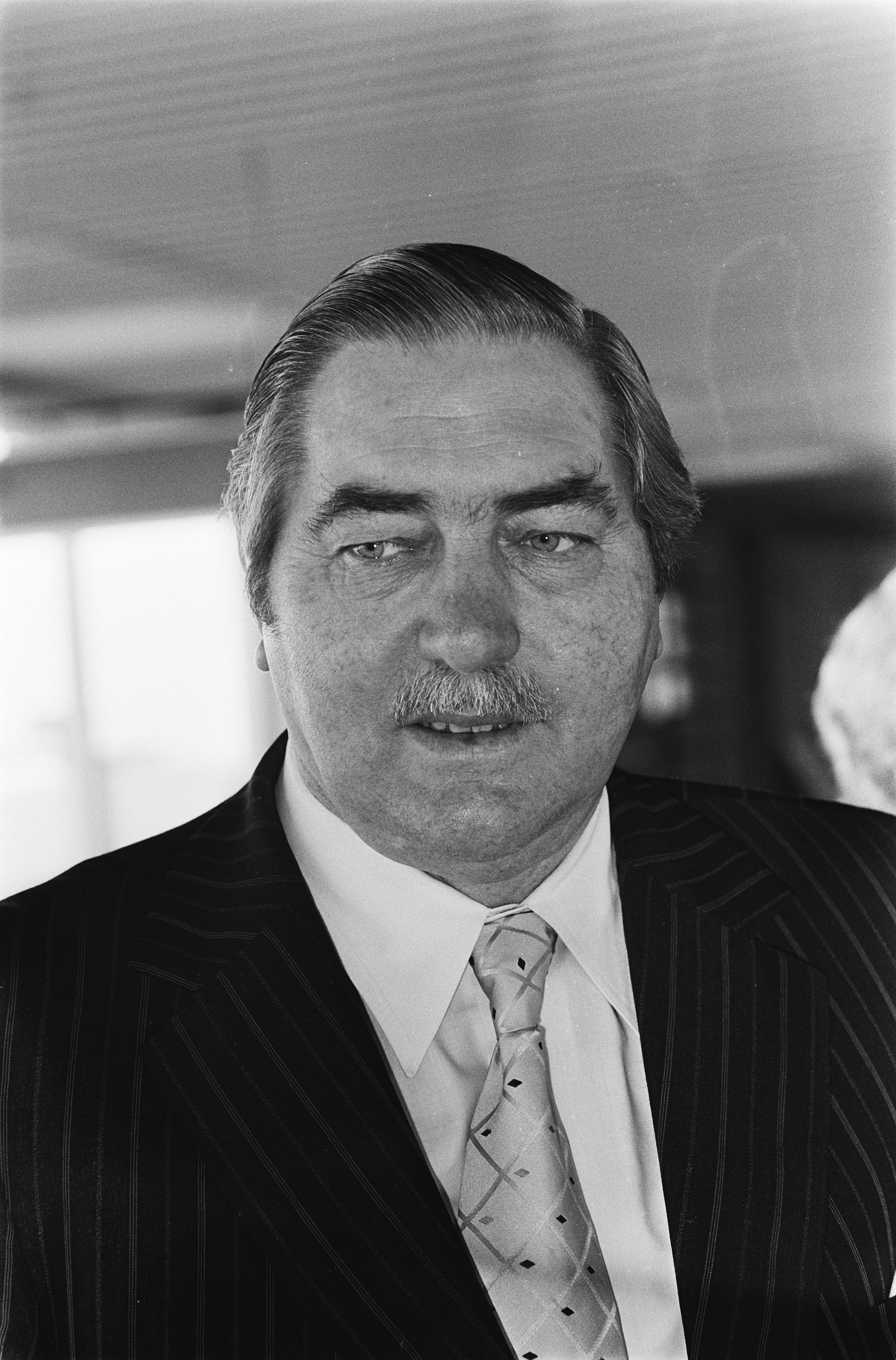

Minister of Trade and Commerce of Zimbabwe
- In office 19 April 1980 – March 1981
- Prime Minister: Robert Mugabe
- Deputy: Moses Mvenge
- Preceded by: Ernest Bulle (Zimbabwe Rhodesia)
- Succeeded by: Richard Hove

Minister of Finance of Zimbabwe Rhodesia
- In office 1 June 1979 – 12 December 1979
- Prime Minister: Abel Muzorewa
- Deputy: Dennis Nyamuswa
- Preceded by: Himself (Rhodesia)
- Succeeded by: Enos Nkala (Zimbabwe)

Minister of Commerce and Industry of Rhodesia
- In office April 1978 – 1979 Serving with Ernest Bulle
- Prime Minister: Ian Smith
- Succeeded by: Ernest Bulle (Zimbabwe Rhodesia)

Deputy Prime Minister of Rhodesia
- In office 20 August 1976 – 1979
- Prime Minister: Ian Smith
- Preceded by: John Wrathall
- Succeeded by: Silas Mundawarara (Zimbabwe Rhodesia)

Minister of Finance of Rhodesia
- In office 13 January 1976 – 1979 Serving with Ernest Bulle (1978−1979)
- Prime Minister: Ian Smith
- Preceded by: John Wrathall
- Succeeded by: Himself (Zimbabwe Rhodesia)

Minister of Agriculture of Rhodesia
- In office September 1968 – January 1976
- Prime Minister: Ian Smith
- Preceded by: George Rudland
- Succeeded by: Rollo Hayman

Personal details
- Born: 19 April 1922 Argyll, Scotland
- Died: 9 July 1996 (aged 74) Harare, Zimbabwe
- Resting place: Kilkerran Cemetery, Campbeltown, Scotland
- Party: Rhodesian Front
- Spouse: Jean Graham (m. 1948)
- Children: 5
- Awards: Legion of Merit GLM Independence Commemorative Decoration ICD

David Colville Smith GLM ICD (19 April 1922 – 9 July 1996) was a farmer and politician in Rhodesia and its successor states, Zimbabwe Rhodesia and Zimbabwe. He served in the cabinet of Rhodesia as Minister of Agriculture from 1968 to 1976, Minister of Finance from 1976 to 1979, and Minister of Commerce and Industry from 1978 to 1979. From 1976 to 1979, he also served Deputy Prime Minister of Rhodesia. He continued to serve as Minister of Finance in the government of Zimbabwe Rhodesia in 1979. In 1980, he was appointed Minister of Trade and Commerce of the newly independent Zimbabwe, one of two whites included in the cabinet of Prime Minister Robert Mugabe.

Born in Kintyre, Scotland, Smith emigrated to Southern Rhodesia in 1946 to take up farming. Initially a farm assistant, he rose to become a farm manager and later co-founded a farming enterprise of his own in Mazowe. He was elected to the Southern Rhodesian Legislative Assembly in 1965, the year of Rhodesia's Unilateral Declaration of Independence, and was added to the cabinet three years later as agriculture minister. He later held the portfolios of finance and commerce, and served for three years as Ian Smith's deputy prime minister. Considered a moderate within the Rhodesian Front, he was one of a few white ministers included in the cabinets of premier Abel Muzorewa of Zimbabwe Rhodesia in 1979, and by Robert Mugabe in 1980. He resigned from the cabinet and the Rhodesian Front in 1981, and remained in retirement in Harare until his death.

== Early life and family ==
Smith was born on 19 April 1922 on the Kintyre peninsula of Argyll, Scotland, either in Campbeltown or at his family's Corran farm in Clachan. He was the son of farmer William Reid Smith, a Newmains native, and Margaret Brown Mundell, who originated from Bellochantuy. He was educated at Campbeltown Grammar School.

Smith emigrated to Southern Rhodesia in 1946, sailing from England on the Winchester Castle's first post-war voyage. His brother, Hamish Smith, also moved to the colony and farmed in Nyabira. Prior to leaving, Smith became engaged to Jean Barclay Graham, whom he married in 1948. Together, they had five children, Catherine, Marge, Graham, Elizabeth, and William Lindsay—who died in 1952 at the age of two—and fourteen grandchildren.

== Farming in Rhodesia ==
In Southern Rhodesia, Smith initially worked as a farm assistant, before becoming a farm manager. He later started his own farming enterprise, Smith and Wheeler (Pvt) Ltd., with a partner in Mazowe. He joined the Grain Marketing Board in 1953, and served on several other agricultural committees. He became chairman of the national Farmers' Co-operative in 1966. In 1974, he purchased a farm in Banket worth several hundred thousand dollars.

== Political career ==
In 1965, the year of Rhodesia's Unilateral Declaration of Independence, Smith was elected to the Southern Rhodesian Legislative Assembly for the Marandellas constituency. On 28 September 1968, he was named to Prime Minister Ian Smith's cabinet as Minister of Agriculture, succeeding George Rudland. At that time, Smith was described as the Rhodesian Front's "most liberal MP" and a moderate within the party who opposed press censorship and favoured a settlement with Britain. He was reelected to Parliament in the 1970 election with 72.5 percent of the vote against independent candidate Thomas Edridge, a Wedza farmer and member of the Rhodesia Tobacco Association's governing council. Edridge and the RTA took issue with price controls put in place by Smith in his capacity as agriculture minister. In April 1970, the month of the election, Smith criticized the RTA and other commodities boards for their political involvement, and accused them of lobbying against him in other government ministries. In 1972, he was elected vice-president of the Rhodesian Front, succeeding Lord Angus Graham. Smith was reelected in 1974 with 79 percent of the vote against Alfred John Harrison, the Rhodesia Party candidate.

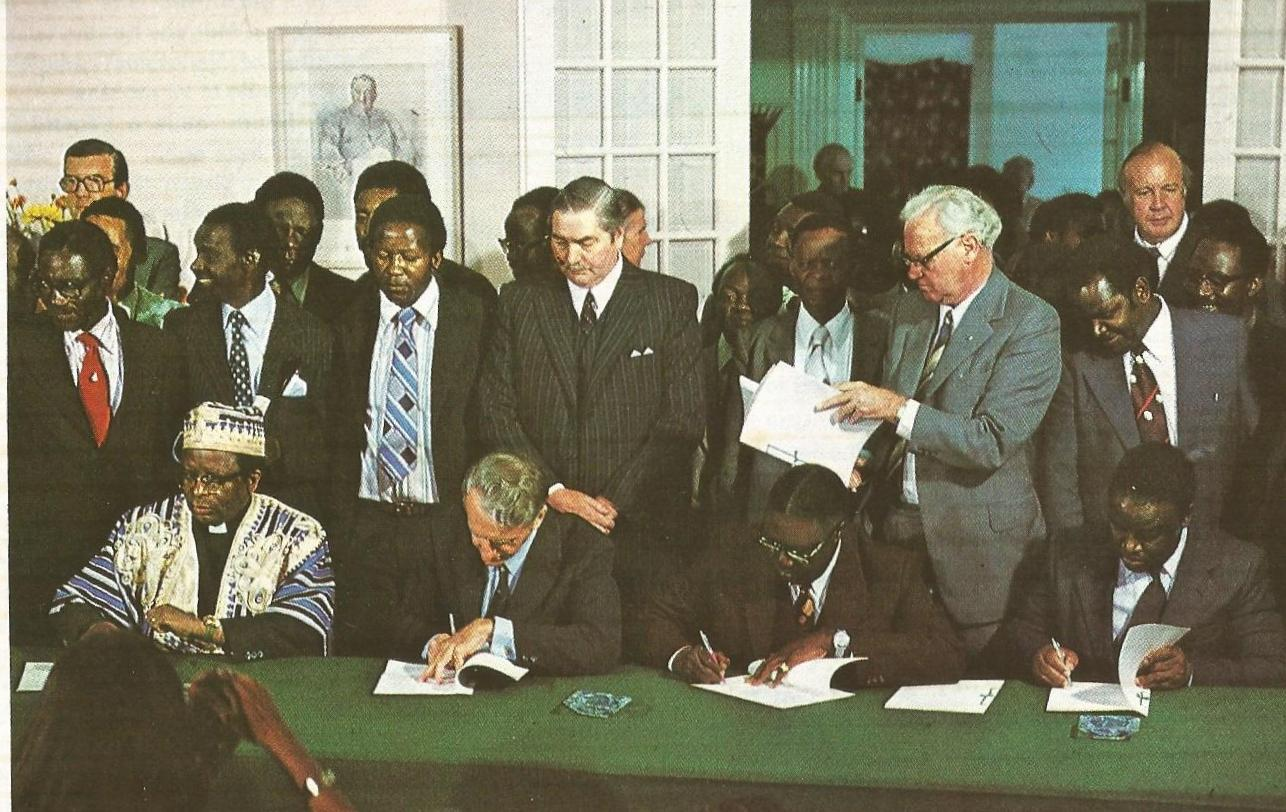
Smith (center) at the signing of the Internal Settlement on 3 March 1978.

On 13 January 1976, Smith was made Minister of Finance after the incumbent minister, John Wrathall, became President of Rhodesia. He became Deputy Prime Minister on 20 August 1976, retaining his finance portfolio. He was returned to Parliament in the 1977 election with 86 percent of the vote against William John Raymond Pratt of the right-wing Rhodesian Action Party. In April 1978, he was appointed joint Minister of Commerce and Industry, serving alongside Ernest Bulle, one of the black co-ministers appointed as a result of the Internal Settlement. That year, he was the first Rhodesian minister to say he would run for Parliament under the Internal Settlement constitution, which would ensure a multiracial government.

On 30 May 1979, Smith was appointed Minister of Finance in the government of Zimbabwe Rhodesia, the successor state to Rhodesia. In a by-election held on 24 July 1979 to replace Hilary Squires, Smith was elected unopposed to Parliament for the Borrowdale constituency. In the fall of 1979, he attended the Lancaster House Conference as part of Zimbabwe Rhodesia premier Abel Muzorewa's delegation. He refused to go unless Ian Smith was also allowed to attend, a demand to which Muzorewa acquiesced. After the conference, which ended the Rhodesian Bush War and led to the creation of the independent Zimbabwe, he kept in personal touch with nationalist leaders Robert Mugabe and Joshua Nkomo.

In the country's first multiracial elections in 1980, Smith was reelected unopposed as MP for Borrowdale, one of the twenty seats reserved for whites. After the election, he was named Minister of Commerce and Industry in Prime Minister Robert Mugabe's cabinet. He was one of two whites in the cabinet, along with agriculture minister Denis Norman, and was the only minister belonging to the Rhodesian Front. He said he would remain in the party, and Ian Smith played a role in his selection for the cabinet. He was sworn in with the other cabinet ministers on 19 April 1980. Later that year, his title was changed to Minister of Trade and Commerce, with the industry portfolio going to Simba Makoni. In early March 1981, Smith resigned from the cabinet, citing ill health. He resigned from Parliament and the Rhodesian Front on 30 April, saying in a statement that he had decided to retire from politics but would be "an interested onlooker".

== Later life and death ==
After leaving politics, Smith remained in Zimbabwe in retirement. He enjoyed riding and shooting, and was a member of the Harare Club and Dining Club. He died at his home in Harare on 9 July 1996 at age 74, several years after being diagnosed with heart disease. He was buried at Kilkerran Cemetery in Campbeltown, Argyll and Bute, with his parents and son, William.

== Awards ==
- Legion of Merit (Grand Officer - Civilian) (GLM) (Rhodesia)
- Independence Commemorative Decoration (ICD) (Rhodesia)
