= Gweru Urban =

Constituency of the Parliament of Zimbabwe

- Constituency for the National Assembly of Zimbabwe
- Province: Midlands
- Region: Gweru

Current constituency
- Seats: 1
- Party: Citizens Coalition for Change
- Member(s): Josiah Makombe

Gweru Urban is a constituency represented in the National Assembly of the Parliament of Zimbabwe, located in Gweru, Midlands Province. Its current MP since the 2023 election is Josiah Makombe of the Citizens Coalition for Change.

== Members ==
A constituency called Gwelo (the town's colonial name until 1982) was represented in the Parliament of Rhodesia from 1914 until 1979.

Note: In the 1990 and 1995 elections, the constituency was called Gweru Central.

Election	Name	Party
Gwelo
1914	Herman Heyman	
1920	William James Boggie	RGA
1924	Max Danziger	Rhodesia Party
1924	David Munro	Rhodesia Party
1928	Max Danziger	Rhodesia Party
1931	Max Danziger	Independent
1933	Frank Delano Thompson	Reform
1934	Frank Delano Thompson	United
1939	Frank Delano Thompson	United
1946	Robert Williamson	Liberal
1948	Desmond Lardner-Burke	United
1954	Robert Williamson	Independent
1956	Charles Falcon Scott Clark	Dominion
1958	Charles Falcon Scott Clark	Dominion
1962	Desmond Lardner-Burke	Rhodesian Front
1965	Desmond Lardner-Burke	Rhodesian Front
1970	Desmond Lardner-Burke	Rhodesian Front
1974	Roger Hawkins	Rhodesian Front
1977	Roger Hawkins	Rhodesian Front
Gweru Urban
1985	Simon Muzenda	ZANU–PF
1990	Simon Muzenda	ZANU–PF
1995	Richard Hove	ZANU–PF
2000	Timothy Mukahlera	MDC
2005	Timothy Mukahlera	MDC
2008	Rodrick Rutsvara	MDC–T
2013	Sesel Zvidzai	MDC–T
2018	Brian Dube	MDC Alliance
2023	Josiah Makombe	CCC

== See also ==
- List of Zimbabwean parliamentary constituencies
