= Minister of Internal Affairs (Rhodesia) =

Minister of Internal Affairs of Rhodesia
- Coat of arms of Rhodesia

- Flag of Rhodesia
- Ministry of Internal Affairs (INTAF)
- Style: The Honourable
- Member of: The Cabinet
- Reports to: The Prime Minister
- Seat: Salisbury, Rhodesia
- Appointer: The Prime Minister
- Term length: No fixed term
- Precursor: Minister of Native Affairs
- Inaugural holder: William Muter Leggate
- Formation: 1933; 93 years ago
- Final holder: Jack Mussett
- Abolished: 1 June 1979; 47 years ago
- Succession: Minister of Home Affairs
- Deputy: Deputy Minister of Internal Affairs

The Minister of Internal Affairs was the head of the Ministry of Internal Affairs, or INTAF, a department of the Rhodesian government concerned with the welfare and development of Rhodesia's rural black population. During the Rhodesian Bush War, the ministry also played a significant military role. The Minister of Internal Affairs was appointed by the Prime Minister of Rhodesia.

The office was first created in 1923 as the Colonial Secretary of Southern Rhodesia. In 1933, it was reconstituted as the Minister of Internal Affairs. In 1979, with the end of Rhodesia and the independence of Zimbabwe, the position was abolished. Its successor office is the Zimbabwean Minister of Home Affairs.

== List of ministers ==
=== Colonial secretary ===
№	Name	Took office	Left office	Political party	Prime Minister	Title
1	Sir Francis James Newton	1 October 1923	1 September 1924	Rhodesia Party	Sir Charles Coghlan	Colonial Secretary
2	John Wallace Downie	2 February 1925	2 September 1927	Rhodesia Party	Sir Charles Coghlan	Colonial Secretary
2	John Wallace Downie	2 September 1927	19 May 1932	Rhodesia Party	Howard Moffat	Colonial Secretary
3	William Muter Leggate	19 May 1932	5 July 1933	Rhodesia Party	Howard Moffat	Colonial Secretary

=== Internal affairs ===
№	Name	Took office	Left office	Political party	Prime Minister	Title
1	William Muter Leggate	5 July 1933	12 September 1933	Rhodesia Party	George Mitchell	Minister of Internal Affairs
2	Stephen O'Keeffe	12 September 1933	14 November 1934	Reform Party	Sir Godfrey Huggins	Minister of Internal Affairs
3	Vernon Arthur Lewis	14 November 1934	13 November 1935	United Rhodesia Party	Sir Godfrey Huggins	Minister of Internal Affairs
4	Sir Percival Fynn	13 November 1935	3 October 1939	United Rhodesia Party	Sir Godfrey Huggins	Minister of Internal Affairs
5	Harry Davies	3 October 1939	2 February 1944	Rhodesia Labour Party	Sir Godfrey Huggins	Minister of Internal Affairs
6	Sir Ernest Lucas Guest	2 February 1944	10 May 1946	United Rhodesia Party	Sir Godfrey Huggins	Minister of Internal Affairs
7	Hugh Beadle	10 May 1946	20 July 1950	United Rhodesia Party	Sir Godfrey Huggins	Minister of Internal Affairs
8	Julius Greenfield	20 July 1950	7 September 1953	United Rhodesia Party	Sir Godfrey Huggins	Minister of Justice and Internal Affairs
9	Julius Greenfield	7 September 1953	5 February 1954	United Federal Party	Garfield Todd	Minister of Internal Affairs
10	Garfield Todd	5 February 1954	26 November 1954	United Federal Party	Garfield Todd	Minister of Internal Affairs and Justice
11	Rubidge Stumbles	26 November 1954	17 January 1958	United Federal Party	Garfield Todd	Minister of Justice and Internal Affairs
12	Alan David Hutchinson Lloyd	17 January 1958	17 February 1958	United Federal Party	Garfield Todd	Minister of Justice and Internal Affairs
13	Reginald Knight	17 February 1958	24 September 1962	United Federal Party	Edgar Whitehead	Minister of Justice and Internal Affairs
14	Rubidge Stumbles	24 September 1962	16 November 1962	United Federal Party	Edgar Whitehead	Minister of Justice and Internal Affairs
15	Blair Vincent Ewing	16 November 1962	17 December 1962	United Federal Party	Edgar Whitehead	Minister of Internal Affairs
16	Jack Howman	17 December 1962	14 April 1964	Rhodesian Front	Winston Field	Minister of Internal Affairs
17	William Harper	14 April 1964	4 July 1968	Rhodesian Front	Ian Smith	Minister of Internal Affairs
18	Lance Smith	16 August 1968	1974	Rhodesian Front	Ian Smith	Minister of Internal Affairs
19	Jack Mussett	1974	1977	Rhodesian Front	Ian Smith	Minister of Internal Affairs
20	Rollo Hayman	1977	8 January 1979	Rhodesian Front	Ian Smith	Minister of Internal Affairs
−	Byron Hove (co-minister)	27 December 1978	18 April 1978	United African National Council	Ian Smith	Minister of Internal Affairs
−	Kayisa Ndiweni (co-minister)	18 April 1978	1 June 1979	Zimbabwe United People's Organisation	Ian Smith	Minister of Internal Affairs
21	Denis Walker	8 January 1979	1 June 1979	Rhodesian Front	Ian Smith	Minister of Internal Affairs
