= Bulawayo East =

- Former constituency for the National Assembly of Zimbabwe
- Province: Bulawayo
- Region: Bulawayo

Former constituency
- Created: 1939–1979; recreated 2005
- Abolished: 2023
- Seats: 1

Bulawayo East was a constituency represented in the National Assembly of the Parliament of Zimbabwe, located in Bulawayo. It was dissolved in the delimitation process prior to the 2023 election. Its most recent MP, elected in the 2018 election, was Ilos Nyoni of the Movement for Democratic Change Alliance. Bulawayo East was also a constituency of the Parliament of Rhodesia between 1939 and 1979.

== Members ==
Election	Name	Party
1939	John Banks Brady	United
1946	David Wood Young	United
1948	Robert Francis Halsted	United
1954	Abraham Eliezer Abrahamson	United Federal
1958	Abraham Eliezer Abrahamson	United Federal
1962	Abraham Eliezer Abrahamson	Rhodesia National
1965	Joel Pincus	Rhodesian Front
1970	Elias Broomberg	Rhodesian Front
1974	Elias Broomberg	Rhodesian Front
1977	Charles McKenzie Scott	Rhodesian Front
Constituency abolished 1979–2005
2005	Welshman Ncube	MDC–N
2008	Thabitha Khumalo	MDC–T
2013	Thabitha Khumalo	MDC–T
2018	Ilos Nyoni	MDC Alliance

== Election results ==
Parliamentary Election 2008: Bulawayo East
Party	Candidate	Votes	%	±%
MDC–T	Thabitha Khumalo	3,587	45.09%	−36.11%
MDC-M	Yasimin Toffa	2,525	31.74%	+31.74%
ZANU–PF	Nacisio Makulumo	1,031	12.96%	−5.84%
Independent	Sakiwe Ndhlovu	471	5.92%	+5.92%
Federal Democratic Union	Dumiso Matshazi	147	1.85%	+1.85%
Independent	Francis Takaendisa	114	1.43%	+1.43%
UPP	Stanley Moyo	80	1.01%	+1.01%
Majority		1,062	13.35%	−49.05%
MDC–T hold		Swing	−33.93%	

Parliamentary Election 2005: Bulawayo East
Party	Candidate	Votes	%
MDC	Welshman Ncube	10,804	81.20
ZANU–PF	Joshua Malinga	2,506	18.80
Majority		8,298	62.40%
MDC win			

== See also ==
- List of Zimbabwean parliamentary constituencies
