= Elias Broomberg =

The Honourable Elly Broomberg MLM

Minister of Information, Immigration, and Tourism of Rhodesia
- In office 1976–1977
- President: John Wrathall
- Prime Minister: Ian Smith
- Preceded by: Wickus de Kock
- Succeeded by: P. K. van der Byl

Minister of Commerce and Industry of Rhodesia
- In office 1974–1976
- President: Clifford Dupont; John Wrathall
- Prime Minister: Ian Smith
- Preceded by: Jack Mussett
- Succeeded by: Desmond Lardner-Burke

Member of the Parliament of Rhodesia for Bulawayo East
- In office 1970–1976
- Preceded by: Joel Pincus
- Succeeded by: Charles McKenzie Scott

Personal details
- Born: 23 December 1915 Johannesburg, South Africa
- Died: 4 November 1977 (aged 61) Rhodesia
- Party: Rhodesian Front
- Spouse: Fay Golub (m. 1938)
- Children: 3
- Occupation: Businessman, politician

Military service
- Branch/service: South African Army
- Unit: National Volunteer Brigade
- Battles/wars: World War II

Elias "Elly" Broomberg MLM (23 December 1915 – 4 November 1977) was a South African-born Rhodesian businessman and politician. Born and raised in Johannesburg, he emigrated to Southern Rhodesia in 1956 and co-founded a textile company in Bulawayo. First elected to Parliament in 1970, he was named Minister of Commerce and Industry by Prime Minister Ian Smith in 1974. Two years later, he was named Minister of Information, Immigration, and Tourism. He chose not to run for reelection in 1977, and after leaving both Parliament and the Cabinet, died the same year.

== Early life and career ==
Broomberg was born on 23 December 1915 in Johannesburg, South Africa. The son of Joseph Louis and Fanny Broomberg, he grew up in a Jewish family. He was educated at Forest High School in Johannesburg. He served in World War II with the South African Army's National Volunteer Brigade.

After the war, Broomberg went into business, and was involved with a number of civic organizations. From 1946 to 1956, he was Chair of the Cotlands Babies Sanctuary. From 1948 to 1956, he was Chair of the Southern Communal Centre Building Fund, from 1954 to 1956 he was Chair of the Coordinating Council of Southern Suburbs Vigilance Associations, and from 1955 to 1956 he was Chair of the Queenshaven Coronation Foundation (Southern Committee). In 1956, he was appointed to the board of South Rand Hospital in Johannesburg, but resigned shortly after when he decided to emigrate.

In 1956, Broomberg immigrated to Southern Rhodesia, settling in Bulawayo. In 1956, along with a business partner, he founded Sentex Weaving Mills, a small textile company with eight Weaving mills and a staff of 14. He was also served as the director of several other companies: Coys, Merlin Limited the Trans-Ocean Import Corporation, the U.D.C. of Rhodesia, Freecor Limited, and United Refineries. From 1958 to 1960, and again from 1966 to 1969, he was President of the Central African Textile Manufacturers Association. In Rhodesia, he also held leadership positions of a number of civic associations: as President of the Lions Club of Bulawayo, as National Chair of the Council for the Blind, as Vice-President of the Rhodesia Society for the Blind & Physically Handicapped, and as Chair of the King George VI Rehabilitation Centre for Blind & Physically Handicapped Children.

== Political career ==
In 1970, Broomberg ran for Parliament as the Rhodesian Front candidate for the Bulawayo East constituency. He defeated his opponent, Centre Party vice president Arthur Sarif, with 65 percent of the vote. In 1974, Broomberg won reelection with 67 percent of the vote against his moderate Rhodesia Party opponent Jurick Goldwasser's 33 percent. Following the 1974 election, Prime Minister Ian Smith appointed Broomberg to the Cabinet as Minister of Commerce and Industry. As commerce minister, Broomberg became a key player in Rhodesia's sanction-busting efforts. He also sought to introduce price controls, which generated strong opposition from the Rhodesian business community. On 11 November 1974, Broomberg was honoured as a Member of the Legion of Merit.

In 1976, Smith reorganized his cabinet, and named Broomberg as Minister of Information, Immigration, and Tourism. Broomberg's appointment was unexpected, as his performance as commerce minister was often criticized within Rhodesia's political establishment and he was widely expected to be dropped from the next cabinet. As information minister, Broomberg oversaw the Rhodesian Broadcasting Corporation, the country's main government mouthpiece. As immigration minister, he sought, largely unsuccessfully, to stem the flow of white emigrants out of Rhodesia. One of his methods was the creation of a section of the ministry's Immigration Promotion Department whose staff would write a letter to every departing white emigrant to ask why they were leaving, and to try to change their mind. As tourism minister, he worked to reverse the decline in tourism to Rhodesia, in particular by promoting the country as a tourist destination to white South Africans. In 1976, he opened a Rhodesian tourism office in Johannesburg, and oversaw a publicity campaign which saw Rhodesian "holiday girls" travel across South Africa in brightly-painted vans to promote tourism in Rhodesia.

Broomberg left the Cabinet the following year after deciding not to run for reelection to Parliament in the 1977 election. He was succeeded as Minister of Information, Immigration, and Tourism by Foreign Minister P. K. van der Byl. He died the same year, on 4 November 1977, and was buried at the Jewish cemetery in Bulawayo.

== Personal life ==
Broomberg married Fay Golub on 25 December 1939. They had three sons. They lived at Clark Road, and later at Selbourne Avenue, in Bulawayo. In his free time, he enjoyed golf, tennis, and painting, and was a member of several clubs: the Bulawayo Golf Club, the Parkview Sports Club, and the Wietzman and Reading country clubs. Broomberg was a practicing Jew and a Zionist, and an active member of the Bulawayo Hebrew Congregation.

== Awards and honours ==
- Member of the Legion of Merit of Rhodesia, Civil Division (awarded 11 November 1974)

== See also ==
- History of the Jews in Zimbabwe
