= 1970 Rhodesian general election =

- 10 April 1970

All 66 seats in the House of Assembly 34 seats needed for a majority
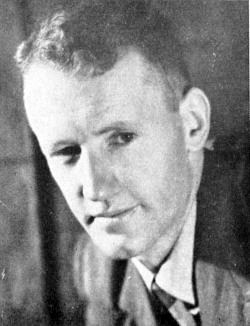
	First party	Second party
Leader	Ian Smith	Pat Bashford
Party	RF	Centre Party
Leader's seat	Umzingwane	Borrowdale (lost)
Last election	50	–
Seats won	50	7
Seat change	Steady	New
Popular vote	39,066 (European)	5,619 (European); 2,147 (African)
Percentage	76.8% (European)	11.0% (European); 49.6% (African)
- Results by constituency European seats on the left, African seats on the right
Prime Minister before election
Ian Smith
RF
Elected Prime Minister
Ian Smith
RF

General elections were held in Rhodesia on 10 April 1970. They were the first elections to take place under the revised, republican constitution. The country had declared itself independent in November 1965, shortly after the previous elections; the Rhodesian Front government had always disliked the 1961 constitution and made sure to change it by the time of the next one.

== Background ==
Following the referendum on the new constitution in June 1969, the timing of the next election was laid out: it would happen once the new Electoral Act had been put in place, and once delimitation of the new constituencies was complete.

This gave opponents of the Rhodesian Front a chance to organise in time for the election. At the Rhodesian Front congress on 23 October 1969, the party chairman Ralph Nilson warned the government to avoid complacency. The Centre Party had been founded in 1968 as a non-racial party which aimed for 'Middle of the Road' political opinion; it supported "advancement of the African on merit" and gradual abolition of racial discrimination and was led by Pat Bashford; it was strongest in the urban areas. Ian Smith described it as "the real opposition".

Robin James, an independent MP who had been expelled from the Rhodesian Front for opposing Ian Smith, formed the Conservative Alliance on 26 June 1969 which campaigned for the preservation of the white presence in Rhodesia. James attacked the Rhodesian Front for 'multiracial, integrationist policies'; his party was subsequently renamed the Republican Alliance. Eligible African voters also began to form political parties, among them the National People's Union which aimed to unite Africans against white supremacy without violence.

== Electoral system ==
Under the 1969 constitution, the electorate of Rhodesia returned 66 members of the House of Assembly of Rhodesia. The electoral system was divided into three different classes of seat:

- European roll seats: 50 seats were returned by voters of European descent.
- African roll seats: 8 seats were returned by voters of African descent.
- Tribal seats: 8 seats were returned by Tribal electoral colleges made up of the Chiefs of the Tribes.
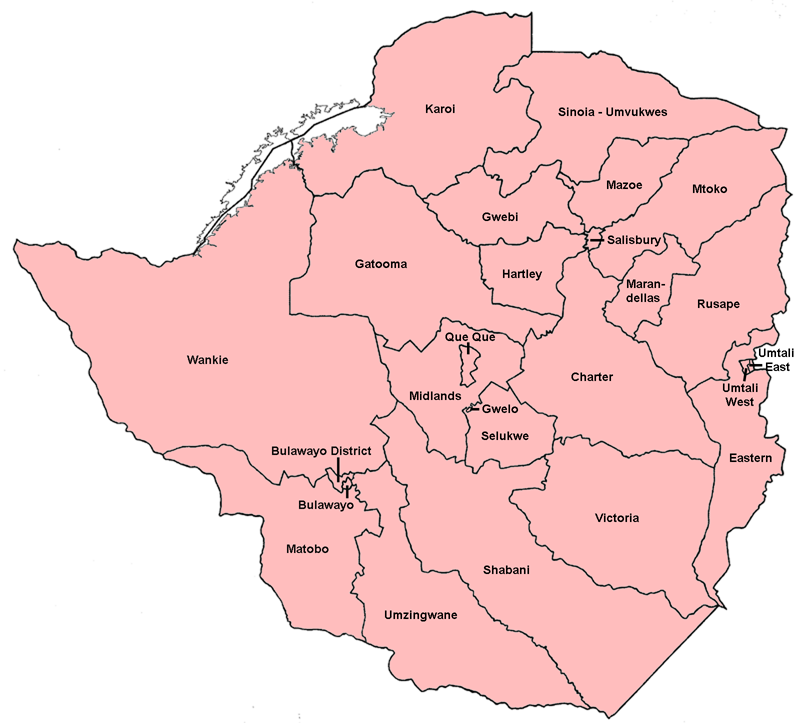
Rural constituencies.

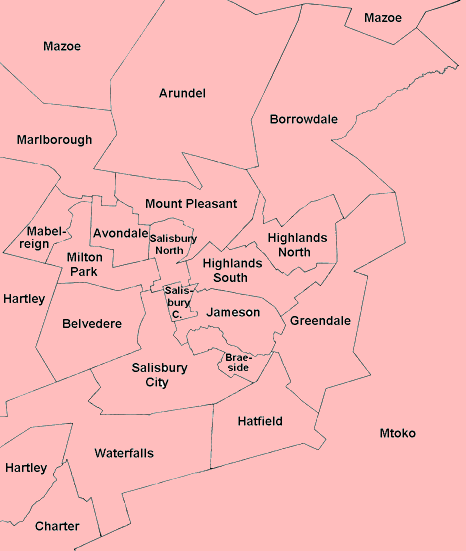
Constituencies in Salisbury.

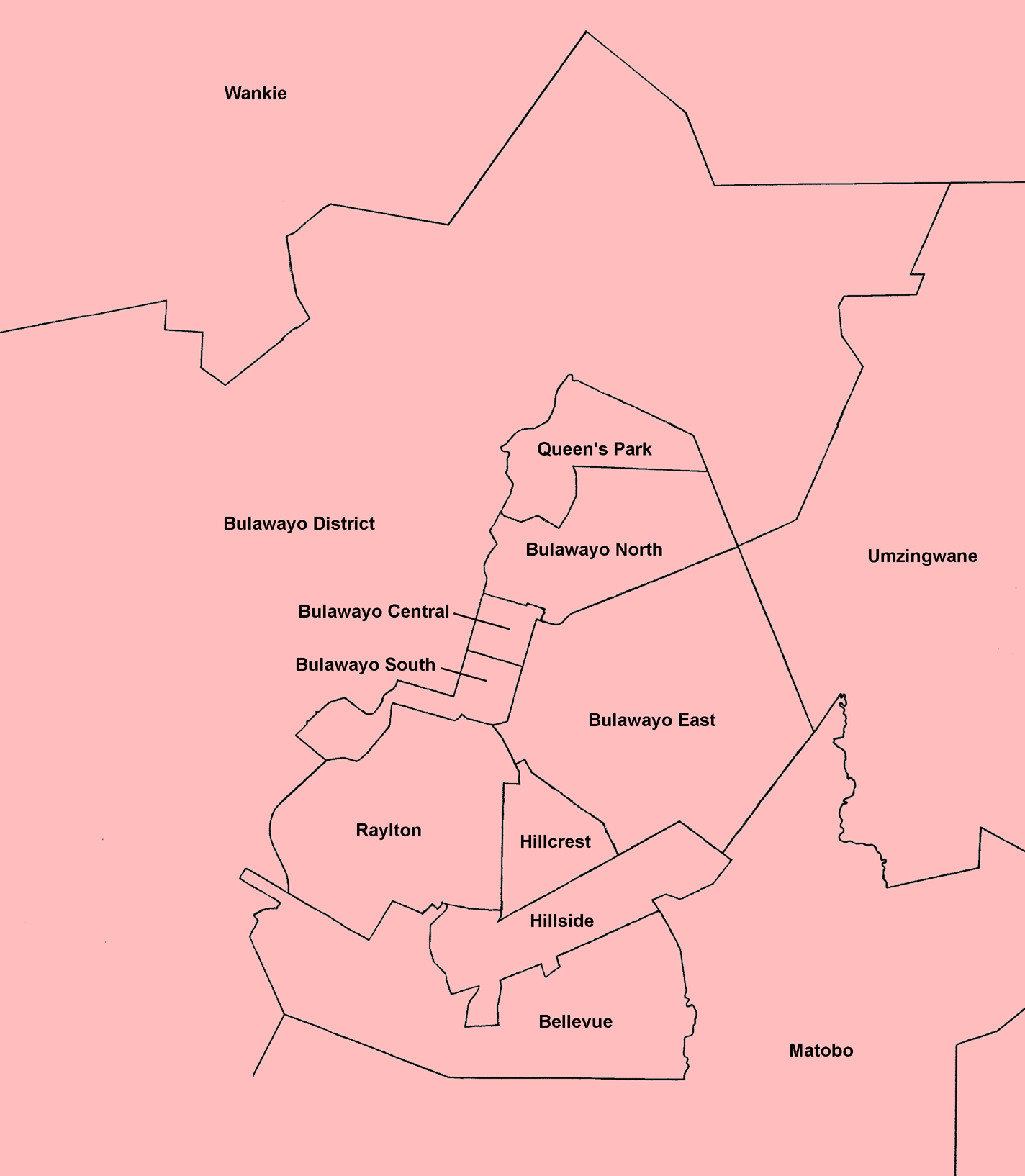
Constituencies in Bulawayo.

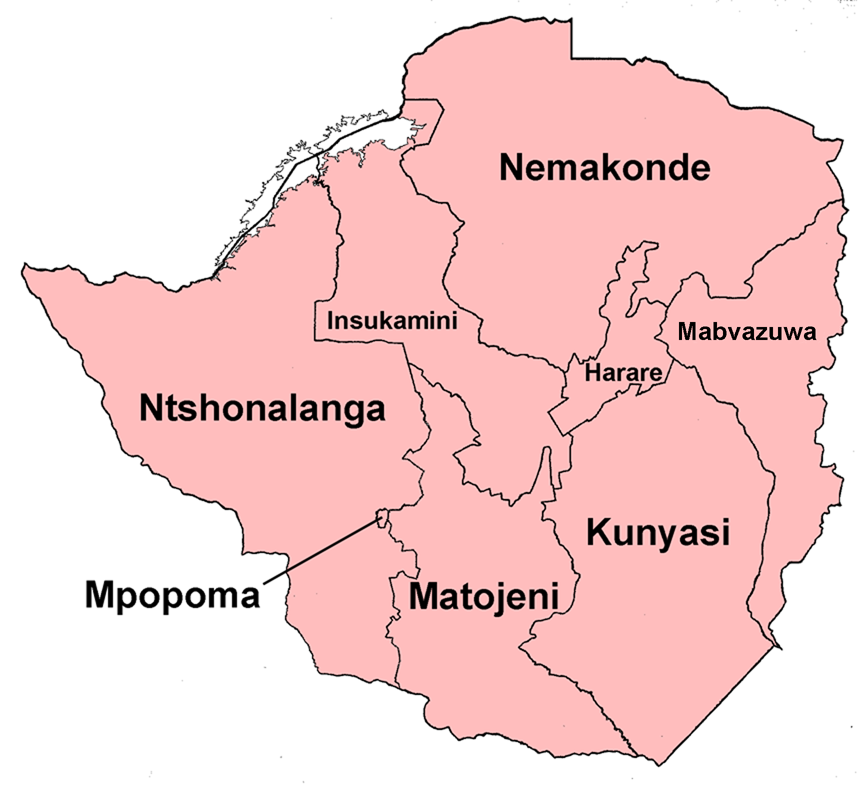
African roll constituencies.

=== Qualification of voters ===
Qualification for being a voter depended on having sufficient means or educational achievement. All voters had to be a citizen of Rhodesia, over 21 years of age, have resided in the constituency for at least three months, and have an adequate knowledge of English and be able to sign the claim form in his or her own handwriting. There were then two rolls for which the voter might qualify, which were determined by their race.

To qualify for the European voters roll, a voter had to be European, Coloured, or Asian and either:

- Have received an income of not less than $1,800 per annum for the previous two years, or
- Own immovable property worth $3,600; or
- Having completed four years' secondary education of a prescribed standard, have an income of not less than $1,200 per annum for the previous two years, or
- Having completed four years' secondary education of a prescribed standard, own immovable property worth $2,400.

To qualify for the African voters roll, a voter had to be African and either:

- Have received an income of not less than $600 per annum for the previous two years, or
- Own immovable property worth $1,200; or
- Having completed two years' secondary education of a prescribed standard, have an income of not less than $400 per annum for the previous two years, or
- Having completed two years' secondary education of a prescribed standard, own immovable property worth $800.

In practice very few Africans qualified, and many who met the qualification requirements refused to register to vote.

Wives were deemed to meet the means qualification through their husbands' earnings or wealth, although for African voters living under a system of polygamy, only the first wife qualified. A Minister of Religion or a member of a religious order living under a vow of poverty was automatically deemed to have met the means qualification. Tribal chiefs also qualified automatically to vote.

Voters were disqualified if they were insane, had been convicted of a serious criminal offence or an offence under electoral law, had been under detention or restriction for more than six months under security legislation, or had been expelled from Parliament. Some voters were also disqualified for receiving Government rations or maintenance in lieu of rations for more than a year.

=== Constituency boundaries ===
A delimitation commission was established by the Electoral Act of 1969, and began work in December 1969. Several of the constituencies were the same as previous constituencies, but some changes were required due to population shifts. The delimitation commission had to work with electorate figures as of 1 February, and could recommend constituencies within 20% either side of a target electorate of 1,740 (which gave a maximum of 2,088 and a minimum of 1,393).

== Campaign ==
On 1 March, Clifford Dupont as 'Officer Administering the Government' signed a proclamation dissolving Parliament and bringing into effect the new constitution at midnight (Rhodesia therefore became a unilaterally-proclaimed Republic on 2 March). The general election was set for 10 April.

The Centre Party announced on 4 March its intention to run 12 candidates. The party declared it accepted the constitution and therefore the independence of Rhodesia. It eventually ran 16; the Republican Alliance had 14, and there were 14 Independents. These candidates generally fell into two categories.

1. The first category comprised candidates who were usually former members of the Rhodesian Front who had fallen out with it over the new constitution or some other issue. Max Cohen (Greendale) had resigned from the Rhodesian Front immediately before the election; Mrs Ina Bursey (Sinoia-Umvukwes) asserted that she was "sticking to the 1962 principles" of the Rhodesian Front; and William Ogley (Que Que) informed voters that he was now more conservative than the RF, just as Arthur Hubbard (Milton Park) said he was now to the right of it.
2. The second category were those fighting rural constituencies in the interests of the farmer. Thomas Edridge (Marandellas) declared he wanted to restore profit to farming. Harry Affleck (Gwebi) and Roy Ashburner (Sinoia-Umvukwes) stood explicitly as farmers' representatives.

A victory for the Rhodesian Front was regarded as inevitable. Ian Smith, helped by the presence of the Republican Alliance, portrayed his government as not being racialist, and sought to postpone the question of what to do about the farming industry until after the election. In the event, the Rhodesian Front won every seat; the most marginal was Salisbury City, which included the large Salisbury community of Indian shopkeepers, and where a mixed-race candidate was only 40 votes off winning. The Centre Party's appeal to non-racial politics played well only among African voters who gave them seven out of the eight seats, with only one going to the National People's Union.

== Results ==
Party	European roll			African roll			Total seats	+/–
Party	Votes	%	Seats	Votes	%	Seats	Total seats	+/–
Rhodesian Front	39,066	76.82	50				50	0
Centre Party	5,619	11.05	0	2,147	49.61	7	7	New
Republican Alliance	1,633	3.21	0				0	New
National People's Union				1,000	23.11	1	1	New
Rhodesian African Party				301	6.95	–	0	New
United National Progressive Party				70	1.62	–	0	New
All-African People's Party				63	1.46	–	0	New
Independents	4,534	8.92	0	747	17.26	0	0	–5
Tribal representatives							8	New
Total	50,852	100.00	50	4,328	100.00	8	66	+1
Registered voters/turnout	65,475	–		8,326	–			

=== European roll seats ===
Constituency Electorate and turnout	Candidate	Party	Votes	%
ARUNDEL; 1,925 (81.5%)	Andrew Skeen	RF	1,193	76.1
ARUNDEL; 1,925 (81.5%)	Alfred Priestley Knottenbelt	CP	375	23.9
AVONDALE; 1,993 (79.2%)	Dr Colin Eric Barlow	RF	1,197	75.8
AVONDALE; 1,993 (79.2%)	Dr Robert West Fynn	CP	382	24.2
BELLEVUE; 1,949 (78.1%)	Wallace Evelyn Stuttaford	RF	1,363	89.5
BELLEVUE; 1,949 (78.1%)	Alfred Henry Vincent	RA	160	10.5
BELVEDERE; 1,882 (79.1%)	Dennis Divaris	RF	1,046	70.3
BELVEDERE; 1,882 (79.1%)	Edmund Thomas Thurlow Nelson	CP	349	23.5
BELVEDERE; 1,882 (79.1%)	John Fraser Caladine Whiting	RA	93	6.2
BORROWDALE; 1,857 (83.3%)	Douglas Hamilton Ritchie	RF	969	62.6
BORROWDALE; 1,857 (83.3%)	Thomas Henry Patrick Bashford	CP	578	37.4
BRAESIDE; 1,904	Herbert Douglas Tanner	RF	Unopposed
BULAWAYO CENTRAL; 1,627	Sydney Henderson Millar	RF	Unopposed
BULAWAYO DISTRICT; 1,792 (81.7%)	Alexander Moseley	RF	1,173	80.1
BULAWAYO DISTRICT; 1,792 (81.7%)	John Stakesby-Lewis	CP	291	19.9
BULAWAYO EAST; 1,699 (81.6%)	Elias Broomberg	RF	904	65.2
BULAWAYO EAST; 1,699 (81.6%)	Arthur Sarif	CP	482	34.8
BULAWAYO NORTH; 1,677 (75.6%)	John James Wrathall	RF	1,197	94.5
BULAWAYO NORTH; 1,677 (75.6%)	Austen Sales Perkins	RA	70	5.5
BULAWAYO SOUTH; 1,583 (68.3%)	Arthur McCarter	RF	988	91.4
BULAWAYO SOUTH; 1,583 (68.3%)	Ernest Leonard Garland	RA	93	8.6
CHARTER; 1,715	Rowan Cronjé	RF	Unopposed
EASTERN; 1,413	Alan James Wroughton Macleod	RF	Unopposed
GATOOMA; 1,557	Albert Gannaway Mells	RF	Unopposed
GREENDALE; 1,974 (79.0%)	Mark Partridge	RF	1,123	72.0
GREENDALE; 1,974 (79.0%)	Max Cohen	Ind RF	436	28.0
GWEBI; 1,527 (83.2%)	Thomas Ian Fraser Sandeman	RF	941	74.1
GWEBI; 1,527 (83.2%)	Harry Affleck	Ind	329	25.9
GWELO; 1,505 (70.9%)	Desmond Lardner-Burke	RF	939	88.0
GWELO; 1,505 (70.9%)	James William Redmond	RA	128	12.0
HARTLEY; 1,710	P. K. van der Byl	RF	Unopposed
HATFIELD; 1,994 (74.3%)	Lance Bales Smith	RF	927	62.6
HATFIELD; 1,994 (74.3%)	Peter Chalmers Chalker	Ind RF	555	37.4
HIGHLANDS NORTH; 1,861 (81.6%)	Bernard Ponter	RF	1,017	67.0
HIGHLANDS NORTH; 1,861 (81.6%)	Mrs. Sheila Maria Nolan	CP	502	33.0
HIGHLANDS SOUTH; 1,854 (80.0%)	Richard Hope Hall	RF	1,133	76.3
HIGHLANDS SOUTH; 1,854 (80.0%)	Jeremy Ralph Bushton Broome	CP	351	23.7
HILLCREST; 1,990	John Arthur Newington	RF	Unopposed
HILLSIDE; 1,892 (79.6%)	Dennis Fawcett Phillips	RF	1,120	74.4
HILLSIDE; 1,892 (79.6%)	Hilary Stephen Norton	CP	386	25.6
JAMESON; 1,874 (75.8%)	John Peter Broberg Nilson	RF	1,209	85.1
JAMESON; 1,874 (75.8%)	Christopher Wordsworth Phillips	RA	212	14.9
KAROI; 1,534 (78.4%)	Daniel Jacobus Brink	RF	784	65.2
KAROI; 1,534 (78.4%)	Bertram Cecil William Hacking	Ind	419	34.8
MABELREIGN; 1,898 (75.0%)	Patrick Palmer-Owen	RF	1,319	92.7
MABELREIGN; 1,898 (75.0%)	Michael Anthony Crow	RA	104	7.3
MARANDELLAS; 1,515 (86.0%)	David Colville Smith	RF	945	72.5
MARANDELLAS; 1,515 (86.0%)	Thomas Edridge	Ind	358	27.5
MARLBOROUGH; 1,942 (73.9%)	William Michie Irvine	RF	1,242	86.5
MARLBOROUGH; 1,942 (73.9%)	Peter Andrew Thomas Young	Ind	194	13.5
MATOBO; 1,650	Allan Savory	RF	Unopposed
MAZOE; 1,644 (75.0%)	George Rollo Hayman	RF	1,075	87.2
MAZOE; 1,644 (75.0%)	Ernest Frederick Konschel	Ind	158	12.8
MIDLANDS; 1,478	Roger Hawkins	RF	Unopposed
MILTON PARK; 1,927 (69.4%)	Arthur Leonard Lazell	RF	1,146	85.7
MILTON PARK; 1,927 (69.4%)	Arthur Valentine Curwen Fortescue Hubbard	Ind	192	14.3
MOUNT PLEASANT; 1,844 (81.9%)	Jack Howman	RF	913	60.5
MOUNT PLEASANT; 1,844 (81.9%)	Nicholas John McNally	CP	597	39.5
MTOKO; 1,670 (79.5%)	Rodney Guy Swayne Simmonds	RF	880	66.3
MTOKO; 1,670 (79.5%)	Guy Kerry Webb	Ind	447	33.7
QUEEN'S PARK; 1,786 (79.5%)	Ian Finlay McLean	RF	1,301	91.7
QUEEN'S PARK; 1,786 (79.5%)	Alford Graham Coppard	RA	118	8.3
QUE QUE; 1,499 (80.7%)	Jacobus Johannes Burger	RF	899	74.3
QUE QUE; 1,499 (80.7%)	William Ernest Ogley	Ind	311	25.7
RAYLTON; 1,713 (82.2%)	Thomas Alexander Pinchen	RF	1,114	79.1
RAYLTON; 1,713 (82.2%)	Stanley Cyril Howard	CP	232	16.5
RAYLTON; 1,713 (82.2%)	William Edward Bailey	RA	62	4.4
RUSAPE; 1,466	Johannes Jacobus Lodewickus de Kock	RF	Unopposed
SALISBURY CENTRAL; 1,937 (66.1%)	Theodore Maurice Ellison	RF	1,064	83.1
SALISBURY CENTRAL; 1,937 (66.1%)	Robin Hugh James	RA	217	16.9
SALISBURY CITY; 1,956 (77.9%)	Edward Aylett Sutton-Pryce	RF	651	42.7
SALISBURY CITY; 1,956 (77.9%)	Gaston Thornicroft	Ind	611	40.1
SALISBURY CITY; 1,956 (77.9%)	Francis Hugh Keenlyside	CP	157	10.3
SALISBURY CITY; 1,956 (77.9%)	Isaline Cecily Dunsterville James	RA	80	5.3
SALISBURY CITY; 1,956 (77.9%)	John Robert Lentell	Ind	24	1.6
SALISBURY NORTH; 1,953 (75.7%)	Andre Sothern Holland	RF	1,001	67.7
SALISBURY NORTH; 1,953 (75.7%)	George Henry Tanser	CP	477	32.3
SELUKWE; 1,431 (76.5%)	Charles Falcon Scott Clark	RF	986	90.0
SELUKWE; 1,431 (76.5%)	Patricia Mary McHugh	RA	109	10.0
SHABANI; 1,457	Ian Birt Harper Dillon	RF	Unopposed
SINOIA/UMWUKWES; 1,633 (77.1%)	Frederick Augustus Alexander	RF	759	60.3
SINOIA/UMWUKWES; 1,633 (77.1%)	Roy William Jack Ashburner	Ind	438	34.8
SINOIA/UMWUKWES; 1,633 (77.1%)	Ina Antoinette Bursey	Ind RF	62	4.9
UMTALI EAST; 1,567 (77.3%)	Bernard Horace Mussett	RF	1,061	87.5
UMTALI EAST; 1,567 (77.3%)	William Lamb	CP	151	12.5
UMTALI WEST; 1,622 (74.7%)	John Christie	RF	988	81.6
UMTALI WEST; 1,622 (74.7%)	Geoffrey Chilcott Taylor	CP	193	15.9
UMTALI WEST; 1,622 (74.7%)	Hajo Spandow	RA	30	2.5
UMZINGWANE; 1,719 (79.6%)	Ian Smith	RF	1,252	91.5
UMZINGWANE; 1,719 (79.6%)	Samuel Albert Gelman	CP	116	8.5
VICTORIA; 2,038	George Holland Hartley	RF	Unopposed
WANKIE; 1,540	Reginald Edward Dennis Cowper	RF	Unopposed
WATERFALLS; 1,847 (76.0%)	Arthur Philip Smith	RF	1,247	88.8
WATERFALLS; 1,847 (76.0%)	Maurice Alan George Dedman	RA	157	11.2

=== African roll seats ===
Constituency Electorate and turnout	Candidate	Party	Votes	%
HARARE; 1,505 (57.3%)	Edward Gabriel Watungwa	CP	527	61.1
HARARE; 1,505 (57.3%)	Gervase Muchada	NPU	153	17.7
HARARE; 1,505 (57.3%)	Patrick John Daniel Rubatika	Ind	119	13.8
HARARE; 1,505 (57.3%)	Mandishona Donson Matimba	AAPP	63	7.3
INSUKAMINI; 491 (54.6%)	Lewis Alban Ndhlovu	CP	97	36.2
INSUKAMINI; 491 (54.6%)	Phillip Elijah Chigogo	Ind	82	30.6
INSUKAMINI; 491 (54.6%)	Sidney Sidwell Bonke Keyi	NPU	74	27.6
INSUKAMINI; 491 (54.6%)	William Henry Kona	UNPP	15	5.6
KUNYASI; 1,488 (48.5%)	Josiah Gondo	NPU	353	48.9
KUNYASI; 1,488 (48.5%)	Johnson Matariro Hungwe	CP	221	30.6
KUNYASI; 1,488 (48.5%)	Cephas Asaph Napata	RAP	93	12.9
KUNYASI; 1,488 (48.5%)	Jepson Mutumwa Mashingaidze	UNPP	33	4.6
KUNYASI; 1,488 (48.5%)	Lazarus Dembetembe	Ind	22	3.0
MABVAZUWA; 1,566 (57.8%)	Lazarus Masenda	CP	420	46.4
MABVAZUWA; 1,566 (57.8%)	Oswald Nyamwanza	NPU	266	29.4
MABVAZUWA; 1,566 (57.8%)	Selby Hlatshwayo	RAP	91	10.1
MABVAZUWA; 1,566 (57.8%)	Ambrose Charles Majongwe	Ind	69	7.6
MABVAZUWA; 1,566 (57.8%)	Davidson Murambiwa Jahwi	Ind	59	6.5
MATOJENI; 646 (42.3%)	Wening Shake Moraka	CP	187	68.5
MATOJENI; 646 (42.3%)	Billy Boarder Matawele	RAP	41	15.0
MATOJENI; 646 (42.3%)	Samson Chibi	NPU	23	8.4
MATOJENI; 646 (42.3%)	Michael Malisela Mojapelo	UNPP	22	8.1
MPOPOMA; 539 (72.9%)	Lwazi Joel Mahlangu	CP	174	44.3
MPOPOMA; 539 (72.9%)	Cephas Hlabangana	Ind	67	17.0
MPOPOMA; 539 (72.9%)	Cleaphas Chihota Chiremba	Ind	60	15.3
MPOPOMA; 539 (72.9%)	Abishai Chimbadzwa Mutasa	Ind	54	13.7
MPOPOMA; 539 (72.9%)	Zachariah Tongai Chigumira	RAP	38	9.7
NEMAKONDE; 1,453 (43.7%)	Ronald T.D. Sadomba	CP	281	44.3
NEMAKONDE; 1,453 (43.7%)	Chad Magumise Chipunza	NPU	131	20.6
NEMAKONDE; 1,453 (43.7%)	Herbert Munukwa Mano	Ind	87	13.7
NEMAKONDE; 1,453 (43.7%)	Paul Harbinett Joseph Chanetsa	Ind	83	13.1
NEMAKONDE; 1,453 (43.7%)	Eric Gwanzura	Ind	45	7.1
NEMAKONDE; 1,453 (43.7%)	Simon Chibvawure Paraffin	RAP	8	1.3
NTSHONALANGA; 638 (42.3%)	Micah Mahamba Bhebe	CP	240	88.9
NTSHONALANGA; 638 (42.3%)	Austin Ruzayi Munyoro	RAP	30	11.1

=== Tribal seats ===
All the successful tribal MPs formed the Rhodesia Electoral Union on election.

Electoral college	Candidate	Votes	%
MASHONALAND
HIGHVELD	Tadeos Mutidzwa Chikonyara	75	35.9
HIGHVELD	Bartholomew Augustine Mabika	63	30.1
HIGHVELD	Calogreedy Chatambudza Zimbudzama	33	15.8
HIGHVELD	Isaac Hanzi Samuriwo	32	15.3
HIGHVELD	Matthew Kwenda	4	1.9
HIGHVELD	Nelson Saite Mutambirwa	2	1.0
LOWVELD	Ranches Chereni Makaya	73	39.2
LOWVELD	Chikati Merkiya Makamure	73	39.2
LOWVELD	Elias Mapiya Badza	40	21.5
MANICA	Naboth Absolom Gandanzara	58	46.4
MANICA	Barnabas Jonathan Munyaradzi Mutasa	31	24.8
MANICA	Tafirenyika Paulus Makumbe	12	9.6
MANICA	Allenby Thodlana	11	8.8
MANICA	Percy Hudson Mkudu	9	7.2
MANICA	Tiripano Francis Zhangazha	4	3.2
MANICA	Oliver Chakonda	–	–
ZAMBEZI	Aaron Takawira Mungate	206	72.8
ZAMBEZI	Stephen Amos Dzuka Chirenda	37	13.1
ZAMBEZI	Luke Mangirazi Kandengwa	24	8.5
ZAMBEZI	Jockoniah Stanley Chigumbura	16	5.7
MATABELELAND
KARIBA	Enock Gudu Sifuya	28	40.6
KARIBA	Amos Zikhundulu Nhliziyo	23	33.3
KARIBA	Sidney Mugore Mangoro	18	26.1
PAGATI	Jeremiah Macelegwana Khabo	34	31.2
PAGATI	Dennis Simanga Nkiwane	32	29.4
PAGATI	Fani Mlingo	28	25.7
PAGATI	Josiah Randa Mtemeri	15	13.8
PIONEER	Josia Bvajurayi Hove	106	79.7
PIONEER	Ephraim Jiro Mhlanga	24	18.0
PIONEER	Ratisayi Zhou	2	1.5
PIONEER	Jotham Siyapela Hove	1	0.8
TULI	Daniel Namate	33	35.5
TULI	Henry Mpumulo Kumile Ncube	31	33.3
TULI	Herbert Habathuri Kokobele	29	31.2

- Note: In the Lowveld electoral college, Ranches Makaya was declared elected after drawing lots, having tied with Chikati Makamure.

== Changes during the Assembly ==
=== Party changes ===
Allan Savory resigned from the Rhodesian Front in 1972 over the issue of land nationalisation. On 31 October 1972, he formed the Rhodesia Party together with Roy Ashburner (who had been an independent candidate in 1970), and Dr Morris Hirsch, who had been a United Federal Party MP in the 1960s.

=== Mabelreign ===
Patrick Palmer-Owen died on 9 June 1971. He was to undergo the first open-heart surgery of its kind at the time, but the operation was unsuccessful. A by-election was held to replace him on 5 August 1971.

Constituency Electorate and turnout	Candidate	Party	Votes	%
MABELREIGN; 1,913 (59.5%)	John Cornelius Gleig	RF	524	46.0
MABELREIGN; 1,913 (59.5%)	Dr Ian George Anderson	Ind	456	40.1
MABELREIGN; 1,913 (59.5%)	William Francis Mandel Weedman	CP	158	13.9

=== Salisbury Central ===
Theo Ellison was convicted of a tax fraud and resigned from the Assembly on 15 November 1971. Nomination day for the byelection was 3 December 1971; only Hilary Gwyn Squires of the Rhodesian Front was nominated, and he was declared elected unopposed.

=== Kunyasi ===
Josiah Gondo died on 27 October 1972, leading to a byelection to replace him on 8 December 1972. Thomas Tavagwisa Zawaira was elected. There were five defeated candidates: Elias Mapiye Badza, Johnson Matariro Hungwe, Percy Hudson Mkudu, Samson Mundondo, and Isaac Hanzi Samuriwo.

=== Victoria ===
George Hartley was made Speaker of the House of Assembly on 27 March 1973, which made him a member of the House ex officio. A byelection to replace him was held on 17 May 1973.

Constituency	Candidate	Party	Votes	%
VICTORIA; 2,048 (67.3%)	Gordon Richard Olds	RF	985	71.5
VICTORIA; 2,048 (67.3%)	Peter Southerton Hingeston	RP	305	22.1
VICTORIA; 2,048 (67.3%)	Leonard George Idensohn	RNP	45	3.3
VICTORIA; 2,048 (67.3%)	Wynn Arnold Starling	United Front	43	3.1

=== Matojeni ===
Wening Moraka died on 7 March 1973 and a byelection was held to replace him on 24 May 1973.

Constituency	Candidate	Party	Votes	%
MATOJENI; 840 (35.2%)	Lot Enock Dewa	Ind ANC	133	44.9
MATOJENI; 840 (35.2%)	John Zachary	Ind ANC	85	28.7
MATOJENI; 840 (35.2%)	Mishi Isaiah Bure Pfumojena	CP	30	10.1
MATOJENI; 840 (35.2%)	Ratisayi Zhou	Ind	18	6.1
MATOJENI; 840 (35.2%)	Simon Dzicaperanhamo Bhene	Ind	15	5.1
MATOJENI; 840 (35.2%)	Samson Chibi	Ind	10	3.4
MATOJENI; 840 (35.2%)	Maurince Mavuwa	Ind	5	1.7

=== Sinoia-Umvukwes ===
Frederick Alexander died on 26 December 1973, and the byelection to replace him was held on 28 February 1974.

Constituency	Candidate	Party	Votes	%
SINOIA-UMVUKWES	Esmond Meryl Micklem	RF	553	53.8
SINOIA-UMVUKWES	James Strathearn Brown	RP	249	24.2
SINOIA-UMVUKWES	Leonard George Idensohn	RNP	199	19.4
SINOIA-UMVUKWES	Thomas Henry Patrick Bashford	CP	27	2.6

=== Raylton ===
Thomas Pinchen resigned from the Assembly on 9 January 1974. The byelection in Raylton was held on 28 February 1974.

Constituency	Candidate	Party	Votes	%
RAYLTON	Patrick Francis Shields	RF	783	66.1
RAYLTON	Julius Michael van Beek	RP	371	31.3
RAYLTON	James Mary Kinley	CP	31	2.6

== Sources ==
- Electoral Act of 1969 (no. 56), Statute Law of Rhodesia.
- Peter Bridger, "Encyclopaedia Rhodesia" (College Press Pvt. Ltd, Salisbury, Rhodesia, 1973).
- Rhodesia Herald
- Sunday Mail
- Report of the Delimitation Commission, 1970
