= Lance Smith (politician) =

English-born Rhodesian farmer and politician

Lance Bales Smith GLM ID

Vice President of the Rhodesian Front
- In office 23 September 1972 – ? Serving with Douglas Lilford
- President: Ian Smith

Minister of Lands (Acting)
- In office 1970–?
- Prime Minister: Ian Smith
- Preceded by: Phillip van Heerden

2nd Minister of Internal Affairs
- In office 16 August 1968 – 1974
- Prime Minister: Ian Smith
- Preceded by: William Harper
- Succeeded by: Jack Mussett

Deputy Minister of Agriculture
- In office c. 1967 – 16 April 1968
- Prime Minister: Ian Smith
- Minister: Jack Howman

Deputy Speaker of the House of Assembly of Rhodesia and Chairman of Committees
- In office May 1965 – April 1970
- Prime Minister: Ian Smith
- Preceded by: John Wrathall

Parliamentary Secretary to the Minister of Agriculture
- In office May 1965 – c. 1967
- Prime Minister: Ian Smith
- Minister: Jack Howman

Minister without Portfolio
- In office 14 April 1964 – May 1965
- Prime Minister: Ian Smith

Member of Parliament
- In office 1970–1974
- Preceded by: John Gaunt
- Succeeded by: Frederick Roy Simmonds
- Constituency: Hatfield
- In office 1965–1970
- Preceded by: Constituency created
- Succeeded by: Daniel Jacobus Brink
- Constituency: Karoi
- In office c. 1950s – 1965
- Succeeded by: Constituency abolished
- Constituency: Lomagundi

Personal details
- Born: Lancelot Bales Smith; 17 January 1910 Felixstowe, Suffolk, England
- Died: 4 May 2000 (aged 90) Banket, Zimbabwe
- Party: Rhodesian Front
- Occupation: Farmer, politician
- Awards: Legion of Merit GLM Independence Decoration ID

Lancelot Bales Smith GLM ID (17 January 1910 – 4 May 2000), was an English-born Rhodesian farmer and politician. Elected to Parliament in the 1950s, he was a founding member of the Rhodesian Front in 1962. He was minister without portfolio in the cabinet of Prime Minister Ian Smith (no relation) at the time of Rhodesia's Unilateral Declaration of Independence in 1965. In 1968, after serving as Deputy Minister of Agriculture, he was appointed Minister of Internal Affairs, a position he held until 1974, when he exited politics.

== Early life and education ==
Smith was born on 17 January 1910, in Felixstowe, Suffolk, England, United Kingdom, the son of a tailor.

== Career ==
=== Early career ===
Smith emigrated to Rhodesia at age 25, intending to join the police force. Instead, he became a successful farmer, and was later elected chairman of the Rhodesian Farmers' Association. Smith was elected to the Southern Rhodesian Legislative Assembly in the 1950s as a member of the United Federal Party, and was known as a moderate MP. He opposed the 1961 Constitution and its creation of separate voting rolls for blacks and whites. He favored a common roll system that would afford educated, middle class black Rhodesians a say in government. Nevertheless, in 1962, he was one of the earliest members of the Rhodesian Front party, which supported independence for Southern Rhodesia and separate voting rolls.

He was reelected to the Legislative Assembly in 1962 as the MP for the Lomagundi constituency. On 14 April 1964, he was appointed Minister without portfolio by the new Prime Minister, Ian Smith. Following the May 1965 elections, Smith was reelected to Parliament and was appointed Parliamentary Secretary to the Rhodesian Minister of Agriculture, and also became Deputy Speaker of the House of Assembly and Chairman of Committees. On 11 November 1965, Smith was present at (but did not sign) Rhodesia's Unilateral Declaration of Independence (UDI).

In 1967, Smith was elevated to Deputy Minister of Agriculture, serving under Minister Jack Howman. In that office, he traveled around Rhodesia, speaking with farmers who were struggling under foreign sanctions imposed as a result of the UDI. In meetings with groups of farmers and stakeholders, he informed them that the Rhodesian government would only contribute 2% of the cost of restoring viability to the country's agricultural industry, with farmers expected to contribute 98% themselves.

=== Minister of Internal Affairs ===
Smith was provided the opportunity for a more prominent role in government with the dismissal of William Harper from the cabinet in 1968. Ian Smith appointed him Minister of Internal Affairs (Harper's former position) on 16 August 1968. He was reappointed on 13 April 1970, shortly after the general election. In the run-up to the 1969 Rhodesian constitutional referendum, which sought to sever Rhodesia's links to the British monarchy and declare itself a republic, Smith was one of the country's fiercest proponents of republic status; on 30 May 1969, he denounced the Queen as a "figurehead and mouthpiece of whatever government is in power in England." In 1970, he became acting Minister of Lands. On 3 September 1970, he spoke before the Parliament, urging them to pass the Land Tenure Amendment Bill, so that churches could continue their interracial worship and other activities.

As Minister of Internal Affairs, Smith introduced plans for black Rhodesians to be required to carry identity cards when working outside of designated areas. These plans were defeated at the Rhodesian Front's annual party congress in October 1971. After the May 1972 Pearce Commission verdict against the provisional independence proposal, he advised black Rhodesians in June 1972 that they would have to rely on themselves to improve their position, and that external assistance would not be available. His "provincialisation" plans, announced on 13 July 1972, were intended to shift control of tribal areas from the white government to African chiefs, thus trending towards separate development for blacks and whites. He also established the Tribal Trust Land Development Corporation. Smith, who was considered to be a moderate politician, grew in popularity in Rhodesian Front during the early 1970s, as reflected by his election as vice president of the party at the annual congress on 23 September 1972. In October 1972, he was entrusted with the opening of dialogue with Zimbabwe African National Union leader Abel Muzorewa. In 1974, Smith was awarded Grand Officer of the Legion of Merit. At the ceremony, his accomplishments as Minister of Internal Affairs were described thus:

"Whilst Minister of Internal Affairs, Mr. Smith established an excellent relationship with Chiefs, Headmen and the African public generally. As Minister he was held in great respect on account of his integrity, his understanding of and sympathy with human problems, his never failing courtesy and humility... His courage and energy were recognized by many and his first thought was always for the good of Rhodesia."

== Later life and death ==
Smith did not run for reelection to Parliament in 1974, and also left office as Minister of Internal Affairs that same year. Following Zimbabwe's independence in 1980, Smith, unlike many whites who emigrated, remained in the country and settled in Banket.

== Personal life ==
Smith was married. He shared no family relation to Rhodesian Prime Minister Ian Smith.

== Electoral history ==
Southern Rhodesian Legislative Assembly, Lomagundi constituency, 1962

- Lance Smith (RF) - 1,003 (61.7%)
- Robert Gordon Hoskins-Davies (UFP) – 622 (38.3%)

Rhodesian Legislative Assembly, Karoi constituency, 1965

- Lance Smith (RF)
- Opponent missing

Rhodesian House of Assembly, Hatfield constituency, 1970

- Lance Smith (RF) – 927 (62.6%)
- Peter Chalmers Chalker (Ind RF) – 555 (37.4%)

== Awards ==
- Legion of Merit (Grand Officer - Civilian) (GLM) (Rhodesia)
- Independence Decoration (ID) (Rhodesia)
