= Ministry of Agriculture (Rhodesia) =

Ministry of Agriculture of Rhodesia
- Coat of arms of Rhodesia

Department overview
- Formed: 1 October 1923; 102 years ago
- Dissolved: 1 June 1979; 47 years ago
- Superseding Department: Ministry of Agriculture of Zimbabwe
- Headquarters: Salisbury

The Ministry of Agriculture was a cabinet ministry of the government of Rhodesia. It was responsible for overseeing the nation's agricultural development.

The Ministry of Agriculture was established during the colonial period of Southern Rhodesia. It retained the same structure when Rhodesia unilaterally declared independence in 1965. The Ministry of Agriculture employed more black Africans than any other branches of the Rhodesian civil service. Many black Africans served as Ministry of Agriculture extension officers and conservation officials. The ministry also published the Rhodesian Agricultural Journal.

The ministry was led by the minister of agriculture, who was appointed by prime minister. The first minister of agriculture following the UDI was the Duke of Montrose, and the last was Mark Partridge. In 1979, Rhodesia became Zimbabwe Rhodesia as part of the Internal Settlement. In 1980 Zimbabwe gained its independence and the ministry was succeeded by the Ministry of Agriculture of Zimbabwe.

== List of ministers ==
=== Agriculture ===
№	Name	Took office	Left office	Political party	Prime Minister	Title
1	William Muter Leggate	1 October 1923	2 February 1925	Rhodesia Party	Sir Charles Coghlan	Minister of Agriculture and Lands
2	John Wallace Downie	2 February 1925	2 September 1927	Rhodesia Party	Sir Charles Coghlan	Minister of Agriculture and Lands
2	John Wallace Downie	2 September 1927	17 October 1927	Rhodesia Party	Howard Moffat	Minister of Agriculture and Lands
3	Osmond Charteris du Port	17 October 1927	29 September 1928	Rhodesia Party	Howard Moffat	Minister of Agriculture and Lands
4	Robert Alexander Fletcher	29 September 1928	19 May 1932	Rhodesia Party	Howard Moffat	Minister of Agriculture and Lands
5	George Mitchell	19 May 1932	5 July 1933	Rhodesia Party	Howard Moffat	Minister of Mines and Agriculture
5	George Mitchell	5 July 1933	12 September 1933	Rhodesia Party	George Mitchell	Minister of Mines and Agriculture
6	Charles Spearman Jobling	12 September 1933	14 November 1934	Reform Party	Sir Godfrey Huggins	Minister of Agriculture
7	Frank Ernest Harris	24 August 1934	14 November 1934	Reform Party	Sir Godfrey Huggins	Minister of Agriculture
–	Frank Ernest Harris	14 November 1934	7 May 1946	United Rhodesia Party	Sir Godfrey Huggins	Minister of Agriculture and Lands
8	Patrick Bissett Fletcher	7 May 1946	8 March 1951	United Rhodesia Party	Sir Godfrey Huggins	Minister of Agriculture and Lands
9	John Moore Caldicott	8 March 1951	7 September 1953	United Rhodesia Party	Sir Godfrey Huggins	Minister of Agriculture and Lands
9	John Moore Caldicott	7 September 1953	5 February 1954	United Federal Party	Garfield Todd	Minister of Agriculture and Lands
–	Patrick Bissett Fletcher	24 December 1953	5 February 1954	United Federal Party	Garfield Todd	Minister of Agriculture and Lands
–	Patrick Bissett Fletcher	5 February 1954	5 February 1954	United Federal Party	Garfield Todd	Minister of Agriculture
European agriculture responsibility of the Federation, 1954–1962 (see list)
10	Herbert Jack Quinton	24 September 1962	17 December 1962	United Federal Party	Edgar Whitehead	Minister of Agriculture
11	The Duke of Montrose	17 December 1962	14 April 1964	Rhodesian Front	Winston Field	Minister of Agriculture
11	The Duke of Montrose	14 April 1964	22 May 1964	Rhodesian Front	Ian Smith	Minister of Agriculture and Natural Resources
11	The Duke of Montrose	22 May 1964	31 December 1966	Rhodesian Front	Ian Smith	Minister of Agriculture
12	George Rudland	31 December 1966	1968	Rhodesian Front	Ian Smith	Minister of Agriculture
13	David Colville Smith	1968	1976	Rhodesian Front	Ian Smith	Minister of Agriculture
14	Rollo Hayman	1976	1977	Rhodesian Front	Ian Smith	Minister of Agriculture
15	Mark Partridge	1977	1 June 1979	Rhodesian Front	Ian Smith	Minister of Agriculture
−	Joel Mandaza (co-minister)	27 December 1978	1 June 1979	Zimbabwe African National Union	Ian Smith	Minister of Agriculture

=== Irrigation/water development ===
№	Name	Took office	Left office	Political party	Prime Minister	Title
1	Geoffrey Ellman-Brown	5 February 1954	6 August 1954	United Federal Party	Garfield Todd	Minister of Roads and Irrigation
1	Geoffrey Ellman-Brown	6 August 1954	4 October 1954	United Federal Party	Garfield Todd	Minister of Irrigation
2	Patrick Bissett Fletcher	4 October 1954	17 January 1958	United Federal Party	Garfield Todd	Minister of Irrigation
3	Eric Drew Palmer	17 January 1958	17 February 1958	United Federal Party	Garfield Todd	Minister of Irrigation
–	Geoffrey Ellman-Brown	17 February 1958	11 June 1958	United Federal Party	Edgar Whitehead	Minister of Irrigation
4	Rubidge Stumbles	11 June 1958	24 September 1962	United Federal Party	Edgar Whitehead	Minister of Roads, Irrigation and Lands
–	Geoffrey Ellman-Brown	24 September 1962	17 December 1962	United Federal Party	Edgar Whitehead	Minister of Irrigation
5	William Harper	17 December 1962	15 February 1963	Rhodesian Front	Winston Field	Minister of Irrigation
5	William Harper	15 February 1963	14 April 1964	Rhodesian Front	Winston Field	Minister of Water Development
5	Arthur Philip van Heerden	14 April 1964	1973	Rhodesian Front	Ian Smith	Minister of Water Development
6	Jack Mussett	1973	1977	Rhodesian Front	Ian Smith	Minister of Water Development
7	Mark Partridge	1977	1 June 1979	Rhodesian Front	Ian Smith	Minister of Water Development
−	Aaron Mgutshini (co-minister)	27 December 1978	1 June 1979	Zimbabwe United People's Organisation	Ian Smith	Minister of Water Development

=== Native agriculture/marketing ===
№	Name	Took office	Left office	Political party	Prime Minister	Title
1	Ralph Drew Palmer	17 January 1958	17 February 1958	United Federal Party	Garfield Todd	Minister of Native Agriculture and Marketing
