= INTAF =

Cabinet ministry of the Rhodesian government

Ministry of Internal Affairs
- Coat of arms of Rhodesia

- Flag of the INTAF

Agency overview
- Formed: 1962; 64 years ago
- Preceding agency: Native Affairs Department
- Dissolved: 1 June 1979; 47 years ago
- Jurisdiction: Rhodesia
- Headquarters: Salisbury, Rhodesia
- Agency executive: Lance Smith, Minister of Internal Affairs (1974)
- Child agencies: Guard Force; Grey's Scouts; Administrative Reinforcement Units

The Ministry of Internal Affairs, commonly referred to as INTAF (or Intaf), was a cabinet ministry of the Rhodesian government. One of Rhodesia's most important governmental departments, it was responsible for the welfare and development of the black African rural population. It played a significant role maintaining control of rural African villages during the Rhodesian Bush War.

Established by the British South Africa Company in 1894 as the Native Affairs Department, it was reconstituted in 1962 as the Ministry of Internal Affairs. It established administrative districts throughout Rhodesia. Each district was led by a white uniformed District Commissioner, who was assisted by a multiracial staff and security forces. As the Rhodesian Bush War began in the early 1970s, INTAF significantly expanded its security operations. It established a paramilitary force, which patrolled the rural areas. It also began intelligence-gathering and maintained the protected villages program. Upon Zimbabwe's internationally recognised independence in 1980, INTAF was disestablished and was succeeded by the Zimbabwean Ministry of Home Affairs.

INTAF was led by the Minister of Internal Affairs, who was appointed by Prime Minister of Rhodesia Ian Smith. William Harper was the first Minister of Internal Affairs, and Rollo Hayman was the last.

== History ==
=== Native Affairs Department, 1894–1962 ===
In 1894 the British South Africa Company established the Native Affairs Department to be responsible for the welfare of black Africans living on tribal trust lands in the colony of Southern Rhodesia. The Head of the Department was the Administrator in Council; beneath him was the Secretary for Native Affairs. Under the Secretary were the two Chief Native Commissioners of Matabeleland and Mashonaland. Under the Chief Native Commissioners were Native Commissioners, who were responsible for the administration of their tribal districts and sub-districts. They were assisted by Assistant Native Commissioners.

=== Ministry of Internal Affairs, 1962–1979 ===
In 1962, the Native Affairs Department was abolished by the Southern Rhodesian government. Most of its duties were designated to the newly established Ministry of Internal Affairs. The exceptions were agricultural responsibilities, which were designated to the Ministry of Agriculture, the administration of Native Purchase Areas, which was taken over by the Ministry of Mines and Lands, and local judicial functions, which were taken over by the Ministry of Justice. Following the ranks of the Colonial Service, the ministry's Native Commissioners were renamed District Commissioners. In addition, the areas formerly known as Native Reserves and Special Native Areas were reclassified as Tribal Trust Land.

William Harper was the first Minister of Internal Affairs beginning in 1964. In October of that year, he oversaw the indaba (conference) of chiefs and headmen at Domboshawa in October 1964, at the end of which the tribal leaders unanimously announced their support for Southern Rhodesia's independence, which was unilaterally declared on 11 November 1965. Harper, a staunch conservative seen as a rival to Rhodesian Prime Minister Ian Smith, resigned from political office on 11 July 1968.

Harper was replaced as Minister of Internal Affairs by Lance Smith, another member of Ian Smith's ruling Rhodesian Front party. In 1970, he oversaw the implementation of the Land Tenure Act, which divided Rhodesia's land into equal halves for the black and white populations. The law was controversial as Rhodesia's white population of around 200,000 was dwarfed by the black population of over four million. Smith also introduced plans for black Rhodesians to be required to carry identity cards when working outside of designated areas. These plans were defeated at the Rhodesian Front Congress in October 1971. After the May 1972 Pearce Commission verdict against the provisional independence proposal, Smith advised black Rhodesians in June 1972 that they would have to rely on themselves to improve their position, and that external assistance would not be available. His "provincialisation" plans, announced on 13 July 1972, were intended to shift control of tribal areas from the white government to African chiefs, thus trending towards separate development for blacks and whites. He also established the Tribal Trust Land Development Corporation. Smith stepped down as INTAF minister in 1974.

Upon the dissolution of Rhodesia and the independence of Zimbabwe in 1980 through the Lancaster House Agreement, INTAF was dissolved and replaced with the Zimbabwean Ministry of Home Affairs.

== Organizational structure ==
INTAF was headed by the Minister of Internal Affairs, who was assisted by the Deputy Minister of Internal Affairs.

=== Personnel ===
District Commissioners, Assistant District Commissioners, District Officers, Cadets and District Assistants were expected to be qualified in Rhodesian law, the customary law of the tribe they dealt with, and the tribal language (i.e. Shona or Sindebele). As the Bush War placed pressure on Intaf, new District Assistants were recruited to serve for the duration of the war - these were called District Security Assistants. The security force of Intaf was known as the Guard Force. This was the descendant of the Matabele Native Police raised in 1894.

In 1975, with the security situation increasingly volatile, a training depot was set up at Chikurubi to ensure all new District Assistants and all members of the Internal Affairs had full military training. Training instructors were recruited from the Rhodesian Light Infantry. Members of the Internal Affairs were mainly black volunteers, but also included white conscripts. The mainstay of National Servicemen were regular officers of the Ministry of Internal Affairs. The Administration cadet national servicemen were Cadet 1 and 2, District Officers and Assistant District Commissioners. Agricultural Officers and African Development Fund men were also National Servicemen trained at Chikurubi. Their training included drill, weapons, map reading, African Customs and African Languages.

As well as providing security at villages, Internal Affairs personnel patrolled the surrounding area. According to the local situation and resources, this was done on foot, on bicycles, in motor vehicles, or on horseback. The utility of INTAF horse-mounted units led to the formation of Grey's Scouts, an army horse-mounted unit, in 1975.

As the war progressed, Intaf formed an elite military branch called the Administrative Reinforcement Units (ARU); these consisted of eight troops (one for each province). The ARU were reinforced with volunteers seconded from the Rhodesian African Rifles, Rhodesian Defence Regiment, and Selous Scouts.

Reservists called up for service with Intaf were generally allotted to units known as "echelons". There was one INTAF echelon for each province.

Intaf maintained light aircraft for transport and reconnaissance, of which one was destroyed by a landmine whilst taxing, some received minor damage from ground fire and one had near miss from a surface to air missile during the Bush War.

Members of INTAF initially wore a khaki uniform formerly worn by the Rhodesian Army with a red beret or a slouch hat with red puggaree, but later wore camouflage.

=== Protected villages ===
Internal Affairs personnel played a prominent role in the war. They served at Joint Operational Centres and were involved in setting up the protected villages program. The paramilitary "Guard Force" later became responsible for security of the protected villages.

=== Ranks ===
Officers

| Rank group | General / flag officers | | Senior officers | | | Junior officers |
|---|---|---|---|---|---|---|---|---|
| Rhodesian Internal Affairs; Regular Service |
| Rhodesian Internal Affairs; Regular Service | Provincial commissioner | District commissioner | Assistant district commissioner | Senior district officer | District officer |
| National Service |
| National Service | | | | | | Senior vedette officer | Vedette officer | Ensign |

Enlisted

| Rank group | Senior NCOs | | | | Junior NCOs | | Enlisted |
|---|---|---|---|---|---|---|---|
| Rhodesian Internal Affairs; Regular Service | | | | | | | No insignia |
| Rhodesian Internal Affairs; Regular Service | Warrant officer | | | Senior district assistant | District assistant grade I | District assistant grade II | Private |
| National Service | | | | | | | No insignia |
| National Service | Vedette senior warrant officer | Vedette junior warrant officer | Staff vedette | Vedette detachment leader | Vedette section leader | Senior vedette | Vedette |

== Budget ==
INTAF's expanded duties during the Rhodesian Bush War corresponded with a great increase in its budget. From the 1971–72 and 1977-78 budgets, the Rhodesian government's allocations to INTAF grew by 305%.
