= List of Royal Air Force personnel =

This article lists those members of the Royal Air Force of the United Kingdom who have become either nationally or internationally famous. This could either be due to commanding squadrons or higher formations in memorable operations, by being awarded high honours or by gaining fame subsequent to their RAF service.

== Notable Royal Air Force personnel ==
- Hugh Trenchard, 1st Viscount Trenchard – founding father of the RAF
- Arthur Tedder, 1st Baron Tedder – WWII RAF Commander, deputy to Eisenhower who received Germany's surrender at the end of the war in Europe, post-war Chief of Air Staff
- Hugh Dowding, 1st Baron Dowding – Commanding officer or RAF Fighter Command before WWII, developer of Dowding system used during Battle of Britain
- Sir Arthur "Bomber" Harris – C-in-C RAF Bomber Command during World War II
- Sir Douglas Bader – Amputee and fighter pilot & POW during Battle of Britain
- Sir Keith Park – New Zealander – AOC No. 11 Group RAF during Battle of Britain
- Sir Frank Whittle – Co-inventor of the turbojet
- Guy Gibson – Dambusters raid leader and VC holder
- Leonard Cheshire – Charity founder and VC holder
- Henry Allingham – World War I veteran and last surviving founder member of the RAF
- David Henderson – founding father of the Royal Air Force.

== Notable people who previously served in the RAF ==
- Richard Attenborough – Actor and director
- Pam Ayres – Poet, TV & Radio presenter
- David Bailey (photographer)
- Ralph Barker – Writer
- Errol Walton Barrow – First Prime Minister of Barbados
- Alan Bates – Actor
- Raymond Baxter – Television presenter and commentator
- Tony Benn – British politician
- Frank Bossard – MI6 personnel who spied for the USSR
- Richard Burton – Actor, served as a navigator
- Brian Blessed – Actor
- Arthur C. Clarke – Science fiction author
- Alex Coomber – Bronze medalist in the 2002 Winter Olympics.
- Roald Dahl – Author. A flying ace who rose to the rank of Wing Commander
- Hilary Devey – Dragons Den – WRAF Air Traffic Control Assistant
- Denholm Elliott – Actor
- Fred Feast – Actor (Coronation Street), served as a Physical Training Instructor (PTI)
- Bruce Forsyth – Entertainer and show host; served between 1947 and 1949 under National Service
- Bruce Barrymore Halpenny-British military historian and Author, served Royal Air Force Police
- Tony Hancock – Comic actor (RAF Regiment)
- Rex Harrison – Actor, reached the rank of Flight Lieutenant
- Rollo Hayman – Rhodesian farmer and politician
- Godfrey Hounsfield – Nobel laureate and co-inventor of Computed tomography.
- George Hutchinson – Professional footballer
- Peter Imbert – Police Officer, served Royal Air Force Police
- T. E. Lawrence – 'Lawrence of Arabia'. Enlisted first as Aircraftman J.H Ross, and later as Aircraftman T.E Shaw
- Peter Larter – England rugby player
- Christopher Lee – Actor, reached the rank of Flight Lieutenant
- Laurence Meredith – Survived 1000 foot parachute-less fall in 1942, Louis Mountbatten staff officer, RAF India historian. United Press International reporter.
- Warren Mitchell – Actor
- Bob Monkhouse – Entertainer, comedian, game show host
- Patrick Moore – Astronomer, broadcaster and author
- Frank Muir – Comic writer
- Alex Murphy (rugby league) Great Britain rugby league player
- Peter Sellers – Comedian and actor, gained the NCO rank of Corporal
- Josef Singer (1923–2009) – Israeli President of Technion – Israel Institute of Technology
- Ian Smith – Rhodesian Prime Minister; reached the rank of Flight Lieutenant during Second World War service
- Billy Strachan, pioneer of black civil rights in Britain, anti-colonial activist, leading British communist
- Norman Tebbit – Lord Tebbit, Politician. A member of the Conservative Party
- Gordon Turnbull – psychiatrist
- Rory Underwood – England rugby player
- Michael Ventris – deciphered Linear B script
- Tony Walton – set/costume designer, director
- Martin Whitcombe – England 'B' rugby player
- Bill Wyman- Bass player, Rolling Stones
- Jeff Young (rugby player) – Welsh rugby player
