= Angus Graham, 7th Duke of Montrose =

Scottish-born Rhodesian politician, farmer and aristocrat

His Grace The Duke of Montrose ID
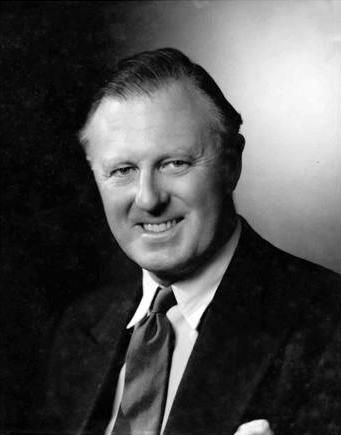
- The Duke of Montrose ca. 1967

Minister of Foreign Affairs of Rhodesia
- In office 31 December 1966 – 11 September 1968
- Prime Minister: Ian Smith
- Preceded by: Ian Smith
- Succeeded by: Jack Howman

Minister of Agriculture
- In office 17 December 1962 – 31 December 1966
- Prime Minister: Winston Field; Ian Smith
- Preceded by: Herbert Jack Quinton
- Succeeded by: George Rudland

Minister of Lands and Natural Resources
- In office 17 December 1962 – 14 April 1964
- Prime Minister: Winston Field; Ian Smith
- Preceded by: Herbert Jack Quinton
- Succeeded by: Philip van Heerden (Mines and Lands)

Member of the House of Lords Lord Temporal
- In office 25 June 1957 – 10 February 1992; Hereditary Peerage
- Preceded by: The 6th Duke of Montrose
- Succeeded by: The 8th Duke of Montrose

Personal details
- Born: James Angus Graham; 2 May 1907 Stirlingshire, Scotland
- Died: 10 February 1992 (aged 84) Stirlingshire, Scotland
- Spouses: Isabel Veronia Sellar (m. 1930; div. 1950) Susan Semple (m. 1952)
- Children: 6, including James Graham, 8th Duke of Montrose
- Parent(s): James Graham, 6th Duke of Montrose; Lady Mary Douglas-Hamilton

Military service
- Allegiance: United Kingdom
- Branch/service: Royal Navy
- Years of service: 1939–1945
- Battles/wars: World War II

James Angus Graham, 7th Duke of Montrose ID (2 May 1907 – 10 February 1992), styled Earl of Kincardine until 1925 and Marquess of Graham between 1925 and 1954, was a Scottish-born Rhodesian politician, farmer and aristocrat. He served as Minister of Agriculture in the Rhodesian government of Ian Smith, and in 1965 was a signatory to Rhodesia's Unilateral Declaration of Independence.

== Biography ==
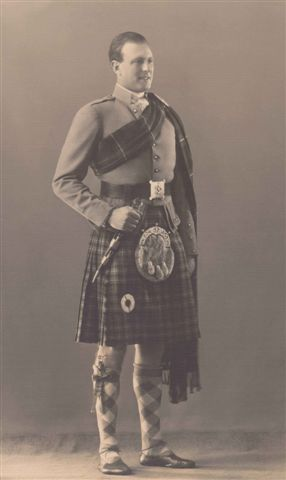
Montrose as Marquess of Graham, aged twenty-one

Born in 1907, the son of James Graham, 6th Duke and Lady Mary Louise, only daughter of William Douglas Hamilton, 12th Duke of Hamilton. His cousin was Colonel Sir Donald Cameron of Lochiel, a prominent Highland soldier and Chief of Clan Cameron.

As Marquess of Graham, the Duke was educated at Eton and Christ Church, Oxford. The Marquess of Graham completed three years at Oxford and graduated Bachelor of Arts. Lord Graham (as he then was) first went to Southern Rhodesia in 1930, where he owned a cattle ranch, and took up a position with A.E. & I., the South African subsidiary of ICI. While he was on holiday in England in 1939, the Second World War with Germany was declared. He signed up with the Admiral Commanding Reserves and was appointed Lieutenant in the Royal Naval Reserve. He joined HMS Kandahar as part of Lord Louis Mountbatten's flotilla in the North Sea and the evacuations of Crete and Greece following the German invasion of Greece.

On 20 January 1954 he inherited his father's titles and became the 7th Duke of Montrose, taking his seat in the House of Lords on 25 June 1957. He took hunting trips in Kenya, where he met his second wife, Susan Semple. The family lived on Derry Farm at Nyabira outside Salisbury, where the crops included maize and tobacco. A pedigree Brahman cattle stud was established after importing bloodstock from Texas.

Montrose, a former member of the pro-Nazi Right Club, was a hardline supporter of racial separation in Rhodesia. He was a member of the Dominion Party of Rhodesia. He was a founder of the Rhodesian Front, which he helped fund. Following Rhodesia's Unilateral Declaration of Independence, Montrose served in the cabinet as Minister of Agriculture, and later as Minister of Defence and of Foreign Affairs.

Although, in an article published in Illustrated Life Rhodesia in the mid-1970s, Montrose indicated that he saw his family remaining in Rhodesia for future generations, he and his family moved to Natal, South Africa in 1979 and then to Kinross, Scotland, where he spent his final days.

He was a speaker of Gaelic and was fond of the Highlands and Islands of Scotland. He was buried in the family cemetery near Loch Lomond.

== Family ==
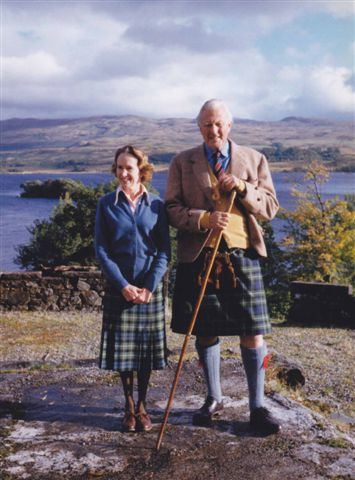
7th Duke and Duchess of Montrose in Scotland, 1981

Graham was first married to Isabel Veronia Sellar and had issue, both born in Southern Rhodesia:

- Lady Fiona Mary Graham (1932–2017); married, in 1966, Peter Alexander O'Brien Hannon and has issue:
  - Catherine Mary Hannon (born 1968)
  - Veronica Maeve Hannon (born 1971)
- James Graham, 8th Duke of Montrose (born 1935 in Southern Rhodesia); married, in 1970, Catherine Elizabeth MacDonell Young and has issue:
  - Lady Hermione Elizabeth Graham (born 1971)
  - James Alexander Norman Graham, Marquess of Graham (born 1973)
  - Lord Ronald John Christopher Graham (born 1975)

He married secondly Susan Mary Joclyn Semple of Kenya and had issue:

- Lady Cairistiona Anne Graham, born 1955; went to Girls High School Salisbury, Rhodesia, married, in 1982, Philip Patrick Saggers of Australia and has issue:
  - Susanna Mary Saggers (born 1984)
  - Marina Lilias Saggers (born 1986)
  - Georgina Frances Saggers (born 1989)
- Lord Donald Alasdair Graham (born 1956); married, in 1981, Bridie Donalda Elspeth Cameron of the Black Isle and has issue:
  - Caitriana Mary Alice Cameron (born 1984)
  - Alasdair John Cameron (1986–1988)
  - Violet Elizabeth Helen Cameron (born 1992)
  - Jennie Alexandra Cameron (born 1993)
  - Finlay Donald Cameron (born 1998)
- Lord Calum Ian Graham; married in 1991 Catherine Beatrice Fraser-Mackenzie (died 2008). Lord Calum Graham married secondly Estelle Baynes née Parry de Winton on 3 August 2013. He had three children with his first wife:
  - Iain Angus Graham (born 1995)
  - Euan Douglas Graham (born 1996)
  - Christabel Emily Graham (born 2001)
- Lady Lilias Catriona Maighearad Graham, married Jonathan Dillon Bell of Wellington, New Zealand, and has issue:
  - Charles Michael Dillon Bell (born 1993)
  - Eleanor Caroline Bell (born 1994)

== Ancestry ==
Ancestors of Angus Graham, 7th Duke of Montrose

8. James Graham, 4th Duke of Montrose
4. Douglas Graham, 5th Duke of Montrose
9. Hon. Caroline Agnes Horsley-Beresford
2. James Graham, 6th Duke of Montrose
10. Sir Frederick Graham 3rd Baronet, of Netherby
5. Violet Hermione Graham
11. Lady Jane Hermione Seymour
1. James Graham, 7th Duke of Montrose
12. William Hamilton, 11th Duke of Hamilton
6. William Douglas-Hamilton, 12th Duke of Hamilton
13. Princess Marie Amelie of Baden
3. Lady Mary Douglas-Hamilton
14. William Montagu, 7th Duke of Manchester
7. Lady Mary Montagu
15. Luise von Alten

Southern Rhodesian Legislative Assembly
New title	Member of Parliament for Gwebi; 1962–1970	Assembly dissolved
Political offices
Preceded by Herbert Jack Quinton	Minister of Agriculture; 1962 – 1964	Succeeded by Himself as Minister of Agriculture and Natural Resources
Preceded by Herbert Jack Quinton	Minister of Lands and Natural Resources; 1962 – 1964	Succeeded by Philip van Heerden as Minister of Mines and Lands
Preceded by Herbert Jack Quinton	Minister of Lands and Natural Resources; 1962 – 1964	Succeeded by Himself as Minister of Agriculture and Natural Resources
Preceded by Himself	Minister of Agriculture and Natural Resources; 1964	Succeeded by Himself as Minister of Agriculture
Preceded by Himself	Minister of Agriculture; 1964 – 1966	Succeeded by George Rudland
Preceded by Ian Smith	Minister of Foreign Affairs; 1966 – 1968	Succeeded by Jack Howman
Peerage of Scotland
Preceded by James Graham	Duke of Montrose; 1954–1992	Succeeded by James Graham
