= George Holland Hartley =

Zimbabwean civil servant and politician

Colonel George Holland Hartley, GLM, ICD, OBE, ED (7 July 1912 – 17 January 1995) was a Rhodesian and Zimbabwean civil servant, Army officer, farmer, and politician. He was Speaker of the House of Assembly of the Parliament of Rhodesia, President of the Senate of the Parliament of Zimbabwe Rhodesia, and a member of the Senate of Zimbabwe.

Born in Bollington, Cheshire, England, the son of Charles Robert Hartley, he came to Southern Rhodesia in 1928. He was in the Department of Native Affairs from 1930 to 1947. From 1949 to 1959 he served as head of the native administration department for Salisbury.

During the Second World War, he fought with the 1st Battalion, Rhodesian African Rifles, for which he was mentioned in dispatches. He later commanded the battalion from 1950 to 1954 and was Officer Commanding Troops Mashonaland from 1954 to 1956.

As a Rhodesian Front candidate, Hartley was elected for Victoria in the 1962 Southern Rhodesian election. As an MP, he claimed that the ruins of Great Zimbabwe, which were in his constituency, could not have been built by Africans, and demanded the censorship of a guidebook which suggested otherwise by the Minister of Internal Affairs.

In 1973, having served as deputy speaker, he became Speaker of the House of Assembly. He was elected President of the Senate of the Parliament of Zimbabwe Rhodesia in 1979. He later served as a member of the Senate of Zimbabwe.
