= Desmond Lardner-Burke =

Rhodesian politician

The Honourable Desmond Lardner-Burke GLM ID

Minister of Justice Minister of Law and Order
- In office 23 June 1964 – 1976
- Prime Minister: Ian Smith
- Preceded by: Clifford Dupont
- Succeeded by: Hilary Squires

Personal details
- Born: 17 October 1909 Kimberley, Cape Colony
- Died: 1984 (aged 74–75) Harare, Zimbabwe
- Party: Rhodesian Front
- Civilian awards: Legion of Merit GLM Independence Decoration ID
- Military awards: None

Desmond William Lardner-Burke GLM ID (17 October 1909 – 1984) was a Rhodesian lawyer and politician.

== Early years ==
Desmond Lardner-Burke was born in Kimberley in the Cape of Good Hope on 17 October 1909, and was educated at St. Andrew's College, Grahamstown. Lardner-Burke became a lawyer. He became a leading member of the Dominion Party, and in 1957 was a founder member of the Southern Rhodesian Association, of which he soon became leader. In 1962, this merged with Ian Smith's United Group and other organisations to found the Rhodesian Front, of which he was a prominent member. Lardner-Burke was a supporter of white supremacy, and claimed to support the views of Cecil Rhodes. In 1971, he preached a sermon from the pulpit of the Cathedral of St Mary and All Saints, Salisbury, in which he claimed that Christ had never declared that everyone was equal, nor that everyone was entitled to equal treatment. He attempted to illustrate how Christian theology could be shown to support apartheid.

At the 1962 Southern Rhodesian general election, Lardner-Burke was elected for the Gwelo constituency. The Rhodesian Front formed the new government, and after a period on the backbenches, Lardner-Burke was appointed Minister for Law and Order and Justice. In this role, he gave advice on which political detainees were suitable for release. He also acted as Leader of the House.

The Times described Lardner-Burke as "responsible for the harassment, arrest and detention without trial of tens of thousands of black nationalists, including President Mugabe, fighting against white rule in the 1960s and 1970s." He first ordered Mugabe to be detained in December 1963, writing:

"whereas certain information has been placed before me and whereas due to confidential information which I cannot reveal, I am satisfied that you are likely to commit acts of violence throughout Rhodesia"

Mugabe spent the next eleven years in various prisons.

== Unilateral Declaration of Independence ==
Lardner-Burke held his seat at the 1965 general election, and was one of the signatories to the Unilateral Declaration of Independence (UDI), signed in Salisbury on 11 November.

Following the UDI, Lardner-Burke stepped up his struggle against militants opposed to the Rhodesian Front. He made the possession of "weapons of war" a mandatory capital offence, and to escape this punishment, those accused were expected to demonstrate that they did not intend to endanger life.

In 1967, Michael Holman, a white student activist, published a poem criticising the Rhodesian Front's racial policy. For this, he was arrested, but a trial acquitted him of any crime. However, Lardner-Burke used his powers to immediately have Holman arrested and detained without trial.

Lardner-Burke again held his seat at the 1970 general election, but stood down in 1974. By 1974, he had been given powers to "arrest without warrant and detain without communication anyone regarded as a threat to the 'public interest'".

The white Rhodesian government was replaced in 1979, and in 1980 a government including Mugabe was elected. Lardner-Burke died in 1984 at St Anne's Hospital, Harare.

== Election of 2008 ==
In the run-up to the 2008 Zimbabwean parliamentary election, the Movement for Democratic Change opposition to Mugabe noted that Lardner-Burke's name appeared on the electoral roll for the Mount Pleasant suburb of Harare. They alleged that the presence of names such as Lardner-Burke's on the roll would permit Mugabe's ZANU-PF party to engage in electoral fraud by falsely claiming the support of dead people. Reports noted the irony of Lardner-Burke potentially posthumously assisting Mugabe in securing a further term as President of Zimbabwe.

== Awards ==
- Legion of Merit (Grand Officer - Civilian) (GLM)
- Independence Decoration (ID)

Southern Rhodesian Legislative Assembly
Preceded by Robert Williamson	Member of Parliament for Gwelo; 1948 – 1954	Succeeded by Robert Williamson
Preceded by Charles Falcon Scott Clark	Member of Parliament for Gwelo; 1962 – 1970	Parliament dissolved
House of Assembly of Rhodesia
New title	Member of Parliament for Gwelo; 1970 – 1974	Succeeded by Roger Hawkins
Political offices
Preceded by Clifford Dupont	Minister of Justice; Minister of Law and Order; 1964 – 1976	Succeeded by Hilary Squires
