= William Muter Leggate =

William Muter Leggate, CMG (27 October 1879 – 30 August 1955) was a British-born Rhodesian politician and farmer.

He was Minister of Agriculture and Lands in the first Rhodesian cabinet from 1923 to 1925 and Colonial Secretary or Minister of Internal Affairs from 1925 until 1933.

He died in Glasgow in 1955.

He was appointed a Companion of the Order of St Michael and St George (CMG) in the 1924 Birthday Honours.
