= Deputy Prime Minister of Rhodesia =

The Deputy Prime Minister of Rhodesia was the deputy head of government of Rhodesia (Southern Rhodesia until 1964), serving under the Prime Minister of Rhodesia. Rhodesia, which became a self-governing colony of the United Kingdom in 1923, unilaterally declared independence on 11 November 1965, and was thereafter an unrecognized state until 1979. In December 1979, the country came under temporary British control, and in April 1980 the country gained recognized independence as Zimbabwe.

== List of deputy prime ministers ==
Portrait	Name	Took office	Left office	Party	Prime Minister
	Ian Smith (1919–2007)	17 December 1962	April 1964	Rhodesian Front	Winston Field
	Clifford Dupont (1905–1978)	21 August 1964	November 1965	Rhodesian Front	Ian Smith
	John Wrathall (1913–1978)	7 September 1966	January 1976	Rhodesian Front	Ian Smith
	David Smith (1922–1996)	20 August 1976	1 June 1979	Rhodesian Front	Ian Smith
