= Laurence Meredith =

Canadian journalist, historian, translator, and WWII pilot, (1907–1990)

John Laurence Russell Meredith (August 14, 1907 – November 1990) was a Canadian newspaper journalist, historian, First Nations language translator, and World War II Royal Air Force pilot.

== Personal ==
John Laurence Russell Meredith was born August 14, 1907, in Vancouver, British Columbia, Canada, to Francis Russell Meredith and Mishea Beryl (Johnson) Meredith, who had immigrated from Perth, Australia, the year before. He was primarily known as Laurence Meredith, however he was also known as "Laurie," "Larry," and "Lawrence" throughout his life. He was a member of the Boys Choir at St. Paul's Anglican Church (Vancouver). His childhood education was received at Lord Roberts School in Vancouver, British Columbia. At age 14, he won the Governor General's Academic Medal for highest standing as a student as he prepared to enter high School. After graduating from The University of British Columbia in 1930 and serving as a principal at a British Columbia school, he moved to London, England, in October 1934 to work for United Press International. He never married and his mother lived with him until she was invited to live in a Grace and Favour cottage by the Queen. He died in November 1990 at Kensington and Chelsea, London, England.

=== Time at university ===
Laurence attended The University of British Columbia from 1925 to 1929, except for a year long break in which he visited Australia. He graduated with 2nd class honors in English and Latin. The following year he returned to the University of British Columbia and received a teaching certificate. While at the University of British Columbia he was the literary editor of "The Ubyssey" from 1928 to 1930, elected president of the Letters Club in 1928, winner of the University Prize, English honour student, member of the Players' Club, and member of the Publications Board.

=== War Record ===
Laurence joined the Royal Air Force during World War II and had a storied five-year career. Early on, he was appointed to the Intelligence Branch of the RAF. On October 10, 1941, he was raised to Acting Pilot Officer on probation (emergency). On December 10, 1941, he was raised to Pilot Officer. This career nearly ended early in 1942 when he fell 1000 feet without a parachute and broke almost every bone in his body. On October 1, 1942, he was demoted to Flight Officer on probation. He made it back into service and was appointed to Louis Mountbatten's staff in 1944. On September 27, 1944, he was promoted to Flight Lieutenant. In 1946, he created an official record of RAF India. On February 10, 1954, he relinquished his commission under the provisions of the Navy, Army and Air Force Reserve Act 1954 and was granted permission to retain the rank of Squadron Leader.

== Professional career ==
=== Pre-United Press ===
Before attending the University of British Columbia, Laurence worked for a lumber camp. This gave him an opportunity to interact with the Kwakwaka'wakw nation. He wrote four articles about the nation that were published by the Library of Congress. He also developed an English translation list of the Kwakwaka'wakw's language. After graduating from the University of British Columbia, he become a teacher at Courtenay High School in Courteney, British Columbia. He taught at Courtenay from 1930 to 1934. For some of his time there, he was also principal.

=== United Press ===
In 1934, Laurence moved to London where he joined United Press International. Apparently, he was sent to the Fiji Islands at the start of his career. His career at United Press International was interrupted by World War II when he joined the Royal Air Force. After World War 2, Laurence returned to United Press International as a foreign correspondent. His articles began to be picked up by international papers in the late 1940s. The earliest known article of his that made it into American or Canadian newspapers appeared in 1947 and it detailed the destruction of the 16 palatial homes in London, known as Carlton House Terrace, to make way for the new home of Britain's Foreign Office. In 1970, Laurence was appointed United Press International's manager in Lisbon, Portugal. His last article to appear in American or Canadian newspapers was an article on the interrupted recovery of the US dollar in August 1973. The article was published in the United States six days after Meredith's 66th birthday. He was later quoted in an article published on the death of United Press International reporter Harold Guard in 1986.

== Additional resources ==
Laurence Meredith's records and ephemera are located in the University Archives of The University of British Columbia.
