= Reginald Cowper =

Rhodesian politician (born 1931)

Reginald Edward Dennis Cowper (born 1931) was a Rhodesian politician.

Born in India, Cowper graduated from the University of Cape Town and was a school principal in Bulawayo before his entry into politics. He entered the Parliament of Rhodesia in 1970, being returned unopposed for the Rhodesian Front for Wankie.

Cowper served as minister for co-ordination, and in that capacity instigated the creation of a Directorate of Manpower in order to control call-ups for military service. He later served as minister of defence from September 1976 to February 1977, when he resigned as a result of controversy arising from his plan to extend call-ups.

Cowper later emigrated to South Africa and became a businessman.

== Sources ==
- Peter Godwin and Ian Hancock, Rhodesians Never Die: The Impact of War and Political Change on White Rhodesia c.1970-1980
- https://www.nytimes.com/1977/02/14/archives/rhodesian-defense-chief-resigns.html
- https://www.nytimes.com/1977/03/11/archives/rhodesia-cabinet-shuffled-security-post-created.html
