= Byron Hove =

Zimbabwean politician (1940-1999)

Byron Reuben Mtonhodzi Hove (1940–1999) was a Zimbabwean politician who served as justice minister in Zimbabwe Rhodesia with Hilary Squires as co-minister, and subsequently in the post-independence Parliament of Zimbabwe. He supported and participated in Prime Minister Ian Smith's Internal Settlement. He later served as ZANU-PF MP for Gokwe until April 1986 when he lost his position for misdemeanors.

On April 18, 1978, he was unexpectedly fired after he criticized the government for excluding blacks from high-level jobs.

In 1980 Hove was thrown out of Parliament after he openly criticized the Mugabe administration for corruption, saying, "there are two laws – one for the leaders and one for the people."
