= Phillip van Heerden =

Rhodesian politician and farmer

Phillip van Heerden, ID (born 19 January 1914) was a Rhodesian politician and farmer. He served as Minister of Lands, Minister of Mines, Minister of Natural Resources, Minister of Water Development, and Minister without Portfolio.

Born in Klerksdorp, van Heerden came to Southern Rhodesia in 1924 and was educated at Umtali High School. During the Second World War, he served with the 1st Battalion, King's Royal Rifle Corps in the Middle East and was mentioned in despatches. He was elected to the Legislative Assembly of Southern Rhodesia in 1958 for Rusape.

During his tenure as Minister of Lands, he faced protests from churches against the new Land Tenure Act, which had the effect of outlawing interracial worship.

He later served as a member of the Senate of Rhodesia.

He was one of the signatories of Rhodesia's unilateral declaration of independence in 1965.
