= Hilary Squires =

South African judge and barrister (1933–2019)

Hilary Gwyn Squires (1933 – 2019) was a South African judge and barrister, who was brought in to preside over the Schabir Shaik fraud and corruption trial in Durban, South Africa, so as not to tie up legal proceedings elsewhere while the trial proceeded.

== Career ==
Squires was born in South Africa in 1933 and was educated at Rhodes Preparatory School near Matopos in Southern Rhodesia (now Zimbabwe) and Diocesan College in Cape Town, before attending the University of Cape Town, where he met his wife, Irene Coralie Hopley. He left South Africa in 1956, returning to Southern Rhodesia where he first practised in Bulawayo, then in Salisbury. He was elected to the House of Assembly as an MP for Salisbury Central in December 1971. This was in a by-election, in which he stood unopposed. He was first appointed Minister of Justice, Law and Order by Rhodesian Prime Minister Ian Smith, later becoming Minister of Defence and Combined Operation, before being appointed a judge of the High Court. After the Lancaster House Agreement and the fall of the white minority government, Squires returned to South Africa to practise law and was appointed to the bench in the province of KwaZulu-Natal.

Squires was accused by supporters of Schabir Shaik and then-Deputy President Jacob Zuma of being racist, because of his Rhodesian background, and the fact that he was a white judge who served under the apartheid regime. However, the South African Human Rights Commission defended Squires.

He died of heart failure on 22 July 2019.

Preceded by Desmond Lardner-Burke	Minister of Justice and Law and Order; 1976-78	Succeeded by Co-Ministry established
Preceded by Single ministry	Co-Minister of Justice, Law and Order, and Public Service; 1978-79; With: Byron Hove, 1978; Francis Zindoga, 1978-79	Succeeded by Chris Andersen; Francis Zindoga
