= George Rudland =

George Wilburn Rudland (19 November 1909 – 5 September 1977) was a Rhodesian politician.

Rudland was Minister of Trade, Industry and Development from 1963 and Minister of Transport and Power from 1964.

In 1965, he was one of the signatories of Rhodesia's unilateral declaration of independence as a minister.

He was Minister of Agriculture from 1966 till 1968.

He died in 1977.
