= William Irvine (Rhodesian politician) =

William Michie Irvine GLM, ICD (17 June 1920 – 2013) was a British-born Rhodesian and Zimbabwean politician and businessman.

He served as Minister of Local Government and Housing, Minister of Mines, Minister of Posts, Minister of Roads and Road Traffic, and Minister of Transport and Power.

After the establishment of Zimbabwe Irvine continue to serve in Parliament until 1987.
