= Parliament of Rhodesia =

1970–1979 bicameral legislature of Rhodesia

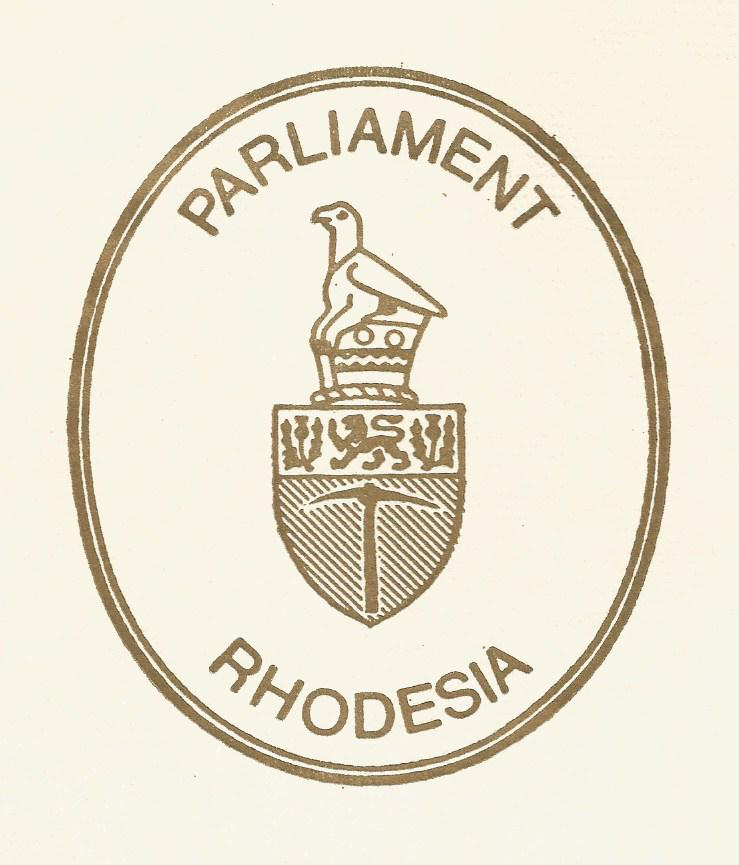

Type
- Type: Bicameral
- Houses: Senate; House of Assembly

History
- Founded: 1970
- Disbanded: 1979
- Preceded by: Legislative Assembly
- Succeeded by: Parliament of Zimbabwe

Elections
- Last House of Assembly election: August 1977

Meeting place
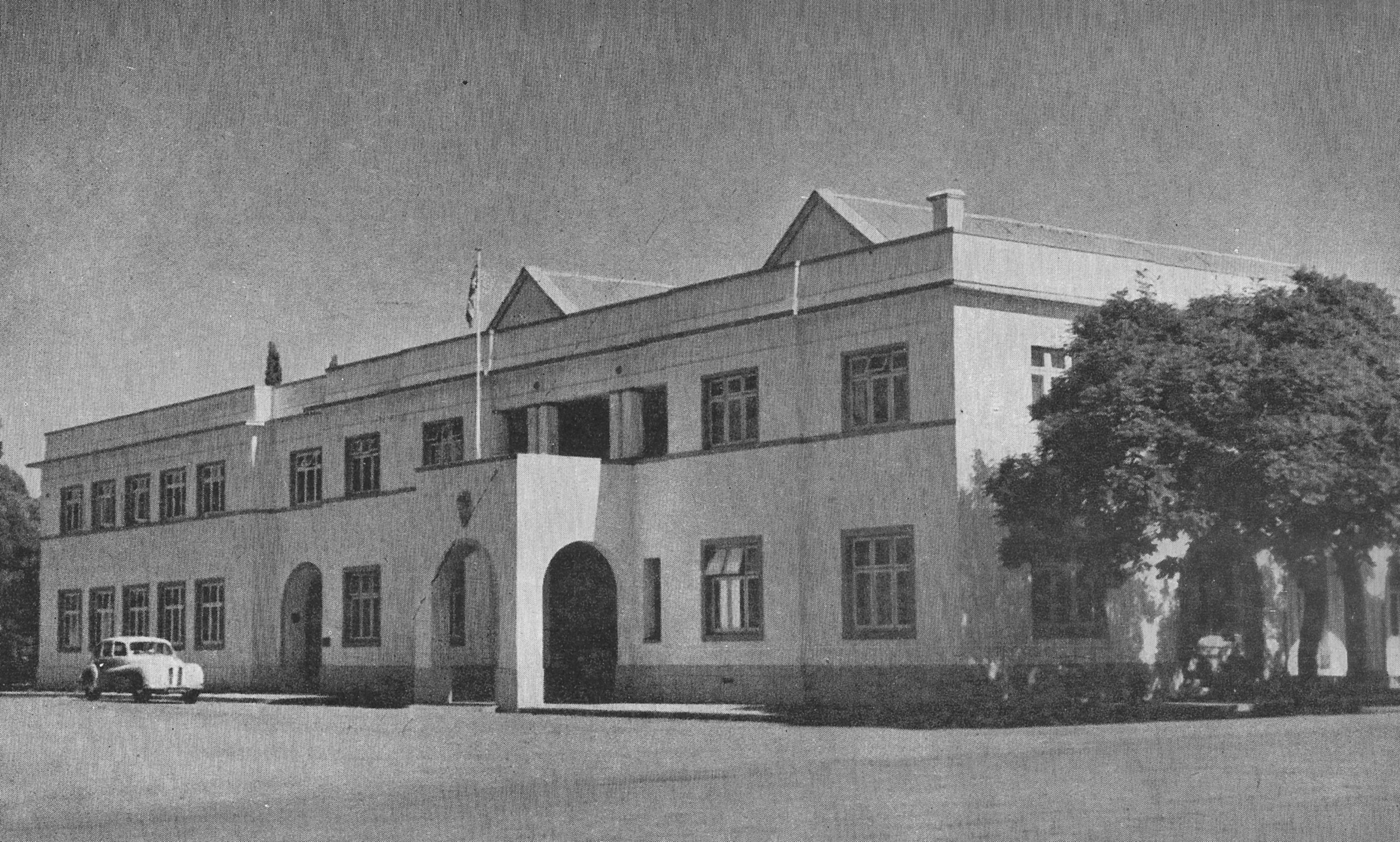
- Parliament building, Salisbury

The Parliament of Rhodesia was the bicameral legislature in Rhodesia from 1970 to 1979. Three general elections were held (namely in 1970, 1974 and 1977).

== Senate ==
The upper chamber was called the Senate, and it had 23 members: ten White Rhodesians, ten African chiefs, and three persons appointed by the president of Rhodesia. The president of the Senate was the presiding officer. The Senate had only delaying powers for legislation.

No.	President	Party	Tenure	Notes
1	Jack William Pithey	RF	1970 – 1 November 1978	
-	John Richard Strong; Acting	RF	December 1978 – 29 May 1979	

== House of Assembly ==
The lower chamber was called the House of Assembly, and it had popularly elected 66 members, organised in Westminster style. Fifty of the members were non-Africans and 16 of the members were African. The parliamentary term was five years. The speaker of the House was the presiding officer.

No.	Speaker	Party	Tenure	Notes
1	Col. Albert Rubidge Washington Stumbles	RF	1970 – 31 December 1972	
2	George Holland Hartley	RF	27 March 1973 – 1979	

== See also ==
- Rhodesia
- List of legislatures by country
