= Bernard Mussett =

Rhodesian politician and businessman

Bernard Horace 'Jack' Mussett, GLM, ID (1915–c. 2007) was a South African-born Rhodesian politician and businessman.

Mussett was described as "one of [Ian] Smith’s most loyal ministerial supporters and the owner of a furniture shop in Umtali".

Mussett served as Minister of Local Government and Housing from 1965 to 1966, Minister of Commerce and Industry from 1966 to 1974, then Minister of Internal Affairs from 1974 to 1977, Minister of Mines from 1977 to 1978, and Minister of Natural Resources, Minister of Water Development, and Minister of Lands from 1977 to 1979.

After the transition to majority rule, Mussett served as a senator.
