= Rhodesian Front =

Ruling party of Rhodesia (1965–1979)

- Abbreviation: RF
- Leader: Ian Smith
- Founded: 1 March 1962
- Dissolved: 6 June 1981
- Preceded by: Dominion Party; Southern Rhodesia Liberal Party
- Succeeded by: Republican Front
- Headquarters: Salisbury, Rhodesia
- Ideology: White supremacy White minority interests Rhodesian nationalism National conservatism Social conservatism Anti-communism
- Political position: Far-right
- Colours: Purple White
- Slogan: Rhodesia to the Front

Party flag

The Rhodesian Front (RF) was a white supremacist political party in Southern Rhodesia, and, subsequently, the independent Rhodesia. Formed in March 1962 by white Rhodesians opposed to decolonisation and majority rule, it won that December's general election and subsequently spearheaded the country's Unilateral Declaration of Independence (UDI) from the Federation of Rhodesia and Nyasaland in 1965, remaining the ruling party and upholding white minority rule through the majority of the Bush War until 1979. Initially led by Winston Field, the party was led through most of its lifetime by co-founder Ian Smith. Following the end of the Bush War and the country's reconstitution as Zimbabwe, it changed its name to the Republican Front in 1981.

== History and ideology ==
The RF was founded on 13 March 1962 in a merger of the Dominion Party (DP), defectors from the anti-Whitehead faction of the United Federal Party (UFP) and former members of the Southern Rhodesia Liberal Party. It was shaky and ideologically split in its early days, with its heterogeneous membership (ranging from advocates of more gradual transition to explicit segregation) united only in their opposition to then-Prime Minister Edgar Whitehead's plans for transition to majority rule, as well as the UK's demands for majority rule before independence. The party harnessed white anxieties of a Congo and Kenya-style majority rule scenario in its successful campaign for the 1962 Southern Rhodesian general election, pledging to keep power "in responsible hands", ensure Southern Rhodesian independence from the Federation, and thwart "this mad idea of a hand-over, of a sell-out of the European and his civilisation, indeed of everything he had put into his country". Its opposition to the UK government's demands for majority rule was so great that the RF-led government eventually declared unilateral independence in 1965.

The RF had fifteen founding principles, which included the preservation of each racial group's right to maintain its own identity, the preservation of "proper standards" through meritocracy, the maintenance of the Land Apportionment Act, which formalised the racial imbalance in the ownership and distribution of land, opposition to compulsory racial integration, job protection for white workers, and the practice of Christianity. Historians have generally defined the party as conservative and wanting to maintain white Rhodesian interests by staunchly opposing majority rule, which the RF argued would lead to a collapse in economic development, law and order, and the emergence of a communist regime in Rhodesia. The party also encouraged immigration of whites from other African former colonies to Rhodesia. The RF maintained an all-white membership and wanted to continue the provision of separate amenities for different races in education and public services; thusly, the party was often characterised as racist both within Rhodesia and abroad. Ian Smith and the RF claimed that they based their policies, ideas, and democratic principles on meritocratic ideals and "not on colour or nationalism", stating that these policies and what he called "separate economic advancement" would ultimately result in an "equal partnership between black and white" as an alternative to majority rule.

The Rhodesian Front was more moderate than the National Party, and never de jure disenfranchised non-white voters in their entirety and did not introduce apartheid-style legislation governing interpersonal relationships: marriage and relationships between whites and non-whites were possible and legal, albeit uncommon. In all other aspects, however, the RF government perpetuated existing racial segregation and inequalities: the white minority's economic domination and ownership of land was maintained, as was the racial segregation of public services, education and electoral rolls through the party's policy of "separate economic advancement". In contrast to the National Party, whose rule expanded and escalated white domination, the RF sought mainly, with some notable exceptions, to maintain minority rule through inexplicit means.

Before the RF's rise to power, separate 'A' and 'B' electoral rolls based on differing income and property qualifications had already de facto disenfranchised the black electorate for decades, with the larger 'A' roll mainly consisting of the wealthier white minority, and the smaller 'B' roll almost exclusively consisting of the small number of Africans eligible and willing to register. Combined with a largely successful boycott campaign from the black majority, this resulted in de facto white minority rule. In an exception to their usual policies, the 1969 constitutional reform explicitly delineated the two electoral rolls by race: With the European 'A' roll increased to 50 seats as opposed to the African 'B' roll only having 8 (with an additional 8 indirectly elected to represent chiefs and tribal interests), this resulted in 270,000 whites having 50 seats and 6 million Africans having 16 seats in the Assembly. These reforms only served to reinforce black rejection of the system.

The Rhodesian Land Tenure Act was introduced the same year, which ostensibly introduced parity by reducing the amount of land reserved for white ownership to the same 45 million acres as for blacks: in practice, the most fertile farmlands remained in white hands, and some farmers took advantage by shifting their boundaries into black-populated territories, often without notifying others, thereby necessating government evictions. In 1977, the party had a schism in which the more hardline wing broke off to form the Rhodesian Action Party (RAP), which opposed Smith's proposals to negotiate a settlement with black nationalist leaders.

In the elections leading to the country's independence in 1980, as the Republic of Zimbabwe, the RF won all 20 parliamentary seats reserved for whites in the power-sharing agreement that it had forged. On 6 June 1981, the party changed its name to the Republican Front, and on 23 July 1984, that party became the Conservative Alliance of Zimbabwe (CAZ) and opened its membership to Zimbabweans of all colours and all ethnic groups. Eleven of its 20 parliamentarians defected over the following four years, but the party again won 15 of the 20 parliamentary seats reserved for whites in the 1985 election. In October 1987, the ruling government of Robert Mugabe officially abolished all reserved seats for whites. When these were abolished, many white MPs became independents or joined the ruling ZANU–PF party.

== Electoral history ==
=== Legislative Assembly elections ===
Year	Popular Vote	Percentage	Seats	Government
1962	38,282	54.9%	35 / 65	RF
1965	28,175	78.4%	50 / 65	RF

=== House of Assembly elections ===
Year	Popular Vote	Percentage	Seats	Government
1970	39,066	76.8%	50 / 66	RF
1974	55,597	77.0%	50 / 66	RF
1977	57,348	85.4%	50 / 66	RF
1979	11,613 (White Roll)	82.0%	28 / 100	UANC
1980	13,621 (White Roll)	83.0%	20 / 100	ZANU

== See also ==
- Politics of Rhodesia
- National Party (South Africa)
