= Rhodesia (1964–1965) =

Self-governing British colony in southern Africa

- 1964–1965
- Flag Coat of arms
- Anthem: "God Save the Queen"
- Status: Self-governing British colony
- Capital: Salisbury
- Spoken languages: English; Shona; Ndebele; Afrikaans; Gujarati; Bangla
- Government: Constitutional monarchy
- Monarch
  - 1964–1965: Elizabeth II
- Governor
  - 1964–1965: Sir Humphrey Gibbs
- Prime Minister
  - 1964–1965: Ian Smith
- Legislature: Legislative Assembly
- History
  - Renamed: 24 October 1964
  - Independence referendum: 5 November 1964
  - 'Rhodesia' made official name (Note: See Rhodesia (1964–1965)#Name for information on the history and legal aspects of the change in name to ‘Rhodesia’): 9 December 1964
  - 1965 election: 7 May 1965
  - Unilateral Declaration of Independence: 11 November 1965

Area
  - Total: 390,580 km^{2} (150,800 sq mi)

Population
  - 1965: 4,422,000
- Currency: Rhodesian pound
- Time zone: UTC+2 (CAT)
Preceded by	Succeeded by
Federation of Rhodesia and Nyasaland; Southern Rhodesia	Rhodesia
- Today part of: Zimbabwe

Rhodesia (Note: /roʊˈdiːʒə/, /roʊˈdiːʃə/) was a self-governing British Crown colony in southern Africa. Until 1964, the territory was known as Southern Rhodesia, and less than a year before the name change the colony formed a part of the Federation of Rhodesia and Nyasaland and hosted its capital city, Salisbury. On 1 January 1964, the three parts of the Federation (Southern Rhodesia, Northern Rhodesia, and Nyasaland) became separate colonies as they had been before the founding of the Federation on 1 August 1953.

The demise of the short-lived union was seen as stemming overwhelmingly from black nationalist movements in Northern Rhodesia and Nyasaland, and both colonies were fast-tracked towards independence - Nyasaland first, as Malawi, on 6 July 1964 and Northern Rhodesia second, as Zambia, on 24 October. Southern Rhodesia, by contrast, stood firmly under white government, and its white population, which was far larger than the white populations elsewhere in the erstwhile Federation, was, in general, strongly opposed to the introduction of black majority rule.

The Southern Rhodesian prime minister, Winston Field, whose government had won most of the federation's military and other assets for Southern Rhodesia, began seeking independence from the United Kingdom without introducing majority rule. However, he was unsuccessful and his own party, the Rhodesian Front, forced him to resign. In the days prior to his resignation, on Field's request, Southern Rhodesia had changed its flag to a sky blue ensign defaced with the Rhodesian coat of arms, becoming the first British colony to use a sky blue ensign instead of a dark blue one. (Note: It was later joined by Fiji and Tuvalu)

== History ==
=== Name ===
On 7 October 1964, the Southern Rhodesian government announced that when Northern Rhodesia achieved independence as Zambia, the Southern Rhodesian government would officially become known as the Rhodesian Government and the colony would become known as Rhodesia.

On 23 October of that year, the Minister of Internal Affairs notified the press that the Constitution would be amended to make this official. The Legislative Assembly then passed an Interpretation Bill to declare that the colony could be referred to as Rhodesia. The Bill received its third reading on 9 December 1964, and passed to the Governor for royal assent, which it did not receive. Although royal assent was not granted, the Southern Rhodesian government discontinued the use of referring to itself as "Southern" Rhodesia and would henceforth exclusively refer to itself as Rhodesia. When the Republic of Rhodesia was invited to compete in the 1972 Summer Olympics in Munich (an offer which was rescinded just days before the start of the games), they arrived at the Olympic Village as ‘Rhodesia’, albeit under the historical dark-blue ensign of Southern Rhodesia and with ‘God Save the Queen’ as their anthem.

=== Political situation after the dissolution of the Federation of Rhodesia and Nyasaland ===
After the dissolution of the Federation of Rhodesia and Nyasaland, Southern Rhodesia was reinstated as a separate colony on 1 January 1964. Since 1962, the territory had been led by the Rhodesian Front, with Winston Field as prime minister. Field had won most of the federation's military and other assets for Southern Rhodesia, but the colony now found itself increasingly alone, with Northern Rhodesia and Nyasaland quickly heading towards independence under black majority rule. Fearing the implementation of a majority-black government in Salisbury by Britain, the white Rhodesian community were now also interested in independence, but under their current political system. However, negotiations between Field and the British government in London in June 1963 and January 1964 did not reflect a great deal of common ground between Salisbury and Whitehall. Many within the Rhodesian Front felt that Field was not fighting hard enough for independence, even thinking that he was allowing himself to be deceived over British promises of sovereignty.

John Gaunt, a former Federal MP for Lusaka and a former District Commissioner in Northern Rhodesia, had been stoking up discontent amongst members of Field's cabinet, which he was a part of. Aware of this, Field demanded his resignation in the spring of 1964. Gaunt asked him to wait over the weekend whilst he cleared up some matters in his office. In that time, Gaunt and Smith organised a plot against Field, now seen as ineffectual after his failure to win independence. Ken Flower, head of Rhodesia's Central Intelligence Organisation, an organisation Field had ordered be set up, had previously warned him there was a conspiracy against him, involving several of his ministers.

The caucus of the Rhodesian Front decided to ask for his resignation on 2 April 1964 and the decision was conveyed to Field the next day, though the formal demand was not made until a Cabinet meeting a few days later. Field was replaced as leader of the Rhodesian Front and as Prime Minister of Rhodesia by Ian Smith on 14 April 1964, despite Governor Sir Humphrey Gibbs urging him to fight against the rebels in his party.

Most of the Southern Rhodesian press predicted that Smith would not last long; one column called him "a momentary man", thrust into the spotlight by the RF's dearth of proven leaders. His only real rival to replace Field had been William Harper, an ardent segregationist who had headed the Dominion Party's Southern Rhodesian branch during the Federal years. The RF's replacement of Field with Smith drew criticism from the British Labour leader Harold Wilson, who called it "brutal", while John Johnston, the British High Commissioner in Salisbury, indicated his disapproval by refusing to meet Smith for two weeks after he took office. Ian Smith revealed his new cabinet on his first day in office, increasing the number of ministers from 10 to 11, making three new appointments, and redistributing portfolios. To Ken Flower's surprise, he was retained by Smith as head of the Central Intelligence Organisation.

One of the first actions of the new government was to crack down hard on the black nationalist political violence that had erupted following the establishment of a second black nationalist organisation, the Zimbabwe African National Union (ZANU), by disgruntled ZAPU members in Tanzania (where, in Dar es Salaam, ZAPU's main base of operations was located) in August 1963. The rival movements were split tribally, with ZAPU predominantly representing the Ndebele people and ZANU the Shona, and politically—ZAPU, which had relabelled itself the People's Caretaker Council (PCC) within Southern Rhodesia to circumvent its ban, was Marxist–Leninist and backed by the Warsaw Pact and its allies, while ZANU had aligned itself with Maoism and the bloc headed by communist China. Their respective supporters in the black townships clashed constantly, also targeting non-aligned blacks whom they hoped to recruit, and sporadically attacked whites, businesses and police stations.

Amid PCC/ZAPU's calls for various strikes and protests, including an appeal for black children to boycott state schools, Smith's Justice Minister Clifford Dupont had Nkomo and other PCC/ZAPU leaders restricted at Gonakudzingwa in the remote south-east two days after Smith took office. The politically motivated killing of a white man, Petrus Oberholzer, near Melsetter by ZANU insurgents on 4 July 1964 marked the start of intensified violence between black nationalists and the police that culminated in the banning of PCC/ZAPU and ZANU on 26 August, with most of the two movements' respective leaders concurrently jailed or restricted. ZANU, ZAPU and their respective guerrilla armies—the Zimbabwe African National Liberation Army (ZANLA) and the Zimbabwe People's Revolutionary Army (ZIPRA)—thereafter operated from abroad. The killing is generally seen as the beginning date of the Bush War.

=== Period as ‘Rhodesia’ after Zambian and Malawian independence ===
On 24 October 1964, the protectorate of Northern Rhodesia became independent as Zambia. As the first country to begin an Olympic Games as one state and leave as another, Zambia required a clarifying placard for its team at the closing ceremony of the 1964 Summer Olympic Games in Tokyo. On the same day, in accordance with previous statements from the government in Salisbury, Southern Rhodesia was renamed ‘Rhodesia’, but this required no placard because Southern Rhodesia, as well as the Federation of Rhodesia and Nyasaland, had always been represented as ‘Rhodesia’ when participating in the Olympics.

In a series of actions clearing the way for a Rhodesian unilateral declaration of independence from Britain, Ian Smith retired the chief of Rhodesia's armed forces, Major General John Anderson, who was known to have opposed any action by Salisbury that he considered unconstitutional. He also rejected an invitation from the British prime minister Harold Wilson to visit London for talks on a new Rhodesian constitution. Smith stated that he was not opposed to talks—on the contrary, he saw them as ‘very important’—but that he found the timing ‘a little premature’, given that Rhodesia had begun the campaign period for an independence referendum on 5 November 1964. Smith also called an indaba of more than 600 chiefs and headmen to gauge the native population's support for Rhodesian independence under the current constitution, and the tribal leaders voted unanimously in favour. Salisbury offered the British government the opportunity to send observers to the indaba, but they rejected the proposal and refused to accept the results as representative of the native opinion on Rhodesian independence.

On 25 October 1964, fifty guests attending Zambia's independence celebrations, including cabinet ministers and foreign dignitaries, who had planned to visit the Rhodesian side of Victoria Falls, refused to cross the border due to a racially based dispute with the Rhodesian border guards. Rejecting a passenger list, the officials requested a passport check outside the bus, and told the passengers to separate into a white group and a non-white group for these checks. They were then told that one of the passengers’ papers was not in order, and, having already protested the checks, the party decided against crossing the border.

=== Independence referendum ===
An independence referendum was held in Rhodesia on 5 November 1964 amongst the mainly white electorate to ascertain the level of Rhodesian voters’ support for independence under the 1961 constitution. The results were more than 90% in favour of independence, on a turnout of over 61%. The vote was almost entirely boycotted by eligible black voters and there were many whites who did not vote.

=== Landslide Rhodesian Front victory in 1965 election ===
A general election was held in Rhodesia on 7 May 1965. The Rhodesian Front, led by Ian Smith, won all 50 of the constituency seats in the 65-seat Legislative Assembly of Rhodesia, in which the predominantly white A roll (95,208 whites and 2,256 blacks) had the most influence. The party did not run in any of the district seats, in which the mostly black B roll had higher weighting.

=== UDI (1965) and later British transitional rule (1979–1980) ===
On 11 November 1965, the government of Ian Smith signed the Unilateral Declaration of Independence, proclaiming Rhodesia a sovereign state. On this date, British colonial rule in Rhodesia ended until 11 December 1979, when Zimbabwe Rhodesia reverted to British rule. The transitional authority in the territory, which began when the British governor arrived on 12 December 1979, referred to the land as ‘Southern Rhodesia’, as had been the name before 1964, until the British relinquished control with the establishment of Zimbabwe on 18 April 1980. Stamp covers from 17 April, however, a day before Zimbabwean independence, referred to the last day of Zimbabwe Rhodesia, perhaps as an act of defiance similar to that of airport officials continuing to fly the short-lived flag of Zimbabwe Rhodesia. ‘Zimbabwe Rhodesia’ also remained in the names of many of the country's institutions, and few changes to government composition took place during the transitional period.

== Politics ==
Rhodesia was never officially regarded as a dominion but was the only colony to enjoy a similar level of autonomy from the United Kingdom. The era between 1964 and 1965 was defined by the Rhodesian struggle for full independence from the British Empire, the initial failure of which brought down Prime Minister Winston Field before the independence of Northern Rhodesia and Nyasaland, and which would eventually be achieved by Prime Minister Ian Smith, who succeeded him.

A referendum was held in 1964 on the independence issue. More than 90% of the votes were cast in favour of independence for Rhodesia. To gauge the views of the Rhodesian tribal communities, in whose culture political authority was predominantly vested in chiefs, Smith called an indaba which resulted in unanimous support for independence amongst Rhodesian tribal chiefs.

Rhodesia held a general election in 1965, the only to take place between the 'Southern Rhodesia' and 'UDI' eras. The Rhodesian Front, which campaigned for independence in the 1964 referendum, won all 50 constituency seats, granting it a supermajority in the Legislative Assembly of Rhodesia.

== Sources ==
- Cilliers, Jakkie (December 1984). Counter-Insurgency in Rhodesia. London, Sydney & Dover, New Hampshire: Croom Helm. ISBN 978-0-7099-3412-7.
- Martin, David; Johnson, Phyllis (July 1981). The Struggle for Zimbabwe (First ed.). London: Faber and Faber. ISBN 978-0-571-11066-7.
- Ranger, Terence (1997). "Violence Variously Remembered: the Killing of Pieter Oberholzer in July 1964". History in Africa. 24. New Brunswick, New Jersey: 273–286. doi:10.2307/3172030. JSTOR 3172030. S2CID 159673826.
- Wilson, Harold (1974) [1971]. The Labour Government, 1964–70: A Personal Record. Harmondsworth, England: Penguin Books. ISBN 978-0-14-021762-9.
- Wood, J. R. T. (June 2005). So Far and No Further! Rhodesia's Bid For Independence During the Retreat From Empire 1959–1965. Victoria, British Columbia: Trafford. ISBN 978-1-4120-4952-8.
