= Independence Decoration =

Civil decoration of Rhodesia

- Type: civil decoration
- Awarded for: To those who took a notable and significant part in the time around the Declaration of Independence
- Presented by: Rhodesia
- Post-nominals: ID
- Status: defunct
- Established: 23 September 1970
- Ribbon bar of the decoration

Precedence
- Next (higher): Legion of Merit
- Next (lower): Independence Commemorative Decoration

The Independence Decoration was a Rhodesian civil decoration awarded to persons who played a notable and significant part in the Unilateral Declaration of Independence in 1965.

== Institution ==
The award was instituted in 1970 by Presidential Warrant, the first awards being made the same year.

== Medal ==
The medal was a sterling silver circular medal worn on the breast. The obverse bore the arms of Rhodesia and the legend RHODESIA INDEPENDENCE ELEVENTH NOVEMBER 1965, while the reverse was blank. The medal was impressed in small capitals with the recipient's name on the rim, and was awarded with a case of issue, miniature medal for wear, and an illuminated certificate. The ribbon consisted of five equal stripes, green, white, gold, white, green. When the ribbon alone was worn, it bore a green rosette to distinguish it from the Independence Commemorative Decoration.

== Recipients ==
29 awards of the Independence Decoration were made between 1970 and 1979. Twenty-eight awards were made in November 1970 to Rhodesian Front politicians including P. K. van der Byl, Des Lardner-Burke and the other ten signatories of the Unilateral Declaration of Independence. No further medals were given out until April 1979, when an award was made to Ken Flower, the Head of the Rhodesian Central Intelligence Organization.

Recipients were entitled to the post-nominal letters: ID.

== List of recipients ==
- Frank Eric Barfoot, CBE
- Thomas Arnoldus Theron Bosman, QC
- Noel Hugh Botha Bruce
- Avon Montgomery Bruce-Brand, CBE
- The Honourable Pieter Kenyon Fleming-Voltelyn van der Byl, MP
- Gerald Bryan Clarke, CMG, ISO
- The Honourable Ian Birt Dillon, MP
- Brigadier The Honourable Andrew Dunlop, DSO
- The Honourable Clifford Walter Dupont
- The Honourable The Duke of Montrose
- Sir Cornelius Greenfield, KBE, CMG
- Senator The Honourable Phillip van Heerden
- The Honourable John Hartley Howman, MP
- Lieutenant-Colonel William MacPherson Knox
- The Honourable Desmond William Lardner-Burke, MP
- The Honourable Ian Finlay McLean, MP
- Senator Stanley Ernest Morris, CMG
- The Honourable Bernard Horace Mussett, MP
- Senator Chief M. Mzimuni
- William Hostes Herault Nicolle, OBE
- Leo Cardwell Ross, MBE
- The Honourable George Wilburn Rudland
- The Honourable Arthur Philip Smith, MP
- Edgar Anthony Tweedie Smith, QC
- The Honourable Ian Douglas Smith, MP
- The Honourable Lance Bales Smith, MP
- The Honourable John James Wrathall, MP
- Chief Zwimba, MBE
- Kenneth Flower
