= Legion of Merit (Rhodesia) =

Order of merit in Rhodesia

Order of the Legion of Merit
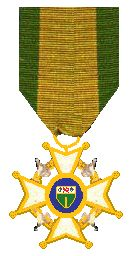
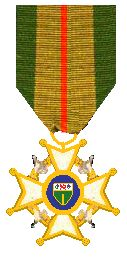
- Legion Of Merit (civil division) Legion Of Merit (military division)
- Type: order
- Awarded for: outstanding service to Rhodesia
- Presented by: Rhodesia; Zimbabwe-Rhodesia
- Eligibility: civilians and military personnel
- Post-nominals: Dependent on grade
- Status: defunct
- Established: 4 November 1970
- First award: 1970
- Final award: April 1981
- Ribbon bar of the civil order Ribbon bar of the military order

Precedence
- Next (higher): Conspicuous Gallantry Decoration
- Next (lower): Independence Decoration

The Legion of Merit was a Rhodesian order of merit awarded to both civilian and military recipients for service to Rhodesia.

== Institution ==
The award was instituted in 1970 by Presidential Warrant, the first awards being made the same year. The last awards were made in June 1980. The civil class was suspended from a green and gold ribbon. The military class differed by featuring a red stripe on the green and gold ribbon.

== Classes ==
There were five classes of the order:

- Grand Commander (GCLM)
- Grand Officer (GLM)
- Commander (CLM)
- Officer (OLM)
- Member (MLM)

The incumbent President of Rhodesia served as Grand Master of the Legion of Merit. Recipients of the order were entitled to the post-nominal letters indicated above. It was retained by the government of Zimbabwe-Rhodesia as well, the President of that state also serving as Grand Master.

== Zimbabwe ==
The Legion of Merit was superseded in April 1981 by the Zimbabwe Order of Merit, which is awarded to civilians as well as military personnel for eminent achievement and services to Zimbabwe.

== Notable recipients ==
While the higher grades of the order were used almost exclusively by Ian Smith's Rhodesian Front government to reward political service, recipients of the lower and middle grades included a number of notable military leaders, community leaders and civil servants.

=== Grand Commanders ===
There were only 5 GCLMs:

| Recipient | Office | Note(s) |
|---|---|---|
| Ian Smith | Prime Minister of Rhodesia | |
| Clifford Dupont | President of Rhodesia | Automatically awarded GCLM on retirement from office. |
| John Wrathall | President of Rhodesia | Automatically awarded GCLM on retirement from office. |
| Gerald Clarke | Principal Secretary to the Cabinet of Rhodesia | |
| Josiah Gumede | President of Zimbabwe Rhodesia | Automatically awarded GCLM on retirement from office. |

No GCLMs were ever awarded in the Military Division.

=== Grand Officers ===
There were 28 GLMs (Civil Division):

| Recipient | Office |
Civil Division
| S. E. Morris | Chief Native Commissioner, Senator |
| W. H. H. Nicolle | Secretary for Internal Affairs |
| Rubidge Stumbles | Speaker of the House |
| N. H. B. Bruce | Governor of the Reserve Bank of Rhodesia |
| Jack Howman | Minister of Defence, Minister of Information, Minister of Tourism |
| Leo Cardwell Ross | Secretary for Information, Immigration and Tourism |
| Lance Smith | Minister |
| D. W. Young | Secretary to the Treasury; |
| Desmond Lardner-Burke | Minister of Justice, Minister of Law and Order; |
| Douglas Lilford | Founder and Vice President, Rhodesian Front |
| E. A. T. Smith | Secretary for Justice |
| T. A. T. Bosman | Attorney General of Rhodesia |
| Harold Hawkins | Commander of the Rhodesian Air Force, Ambassador to South Africa |
| Roger Hawkins | Minister |
| B. H. Mussett | Minister of Transport |
| C. N. Wetmore | Secretary |
| J. F. Gaylard | Secretary |
| A. P. Smith | Minister |
| David Smith | Minister of Finance |
| P. K. van der Byl | Minister of Defence |
| P. D. W. R. Sherren | Commissioner of Police |
| N. H. B. Cambitzis | Rhodesia Front |
| George Holland Hartley | Speaker of the House |
| Mark Partridge | Minister for Natural Resources |
| Jack William Pithey | Acting President of Rhodesia, President of the Senate, Secretary of Justice |
| Henry Everard | Acting President of Rhodesia |
| W. M. Irvine | Minister of Transport and Power |
| Ken Flower | Head of the Central Intelligence Organisation |
Military Division
| Lt. Gen. Peter Walls | Head of the Rhodesian Security Forces |

=== Commanders ===
There were 32 CLMs (Civil Division) and 4 CLMs (Military Division).

| Recipient | Office | Note(s) |
Civil Division
| Janet Smith | - | Wife of Prime Minister Ian Smith |
Military Division
| Col. Ronald Reid-Daly | Commanding officer of the Selous Scouts | |

=== Others ===
There were 126 OLMs (Civil Division).

There were 35 OLMs (Military Division) and 10 OLMs (Military Division) (Combatant).

There were 300 MLMs (Civil Division), 55 MLMs (Military Division) and 10 MLMs (Military Division) (Combatant).
