= Stanley Morris =

Stanley Morris may refer to:

- Stanley Morris (silversmith) (1919–2010), British silversmith and Olympic competitor in painting
- Stanley Ernest Morris, Rhodesian civil servant and politician
- Stan Morris (1893–1948), Australian rules footballer
