= Hostes Nicolle =

Rhodesian civil servant

William Hostes Herault Nicolle, GLM, ID, OBE (born 17 May 1912) was a Rhodesian civil servant.

== Life and career ==
Born in Bulawayo, Nicolle was educated at Milton High School. He joined the Rhodesian civil service in 1930, served in the Ministry of Native Affairs, then the Ministry of Internal Affairs, where he was secretary for internal affairs from 1965, replacing S. E. Morris. He retired on 17 May 1972.

Nicolle was described by Ken Flower as "an advocate of apartheid" who "turned the Department of African Affairs into a political weapon for the government's use." He was known as an admirer of South Africa's system of Bantustans, which he described as "daylight".

In 1968, he accompanied Ian Smith to the talks aboard HMS Fearless, and was blamed by some for sabotaging the talks. Upon his return to Rhodesia, he sent a circular to all district officers, which was leaked and provoked an outcry due to its strongly pro-Rhodesian Front tone and intemperate language.

Nicolle later emigrated to Natal, South Africa.

== Honours ==
He was appointed OBE in the 1961 New Year Honours. In 1970, he received the Independence Decoration. He was appointed a Grand Commander of the Legion of Merit in the 1973 Independence Day Honours.
