= Leo Cardwell Ross =

Rhodesian politician

- Born: October 13, 1957 (age 68); New Zealand
- Occupation: Businessman
- Known for: CEO of Telecom New Zealand

Leo Cardwell Ross GLM ID MBE (24 July 1910 – 1975) served as Secretary for Information, Immigration and Tourism in the Rhodesian Government from 1965 through to 1972 when he retired due to ill health.

== Overview ==
Ross was one of the trusted senior advisors to Prime Minister Ian Douglas Smith attending the talks with the British Government in Gibraltar aboard HMS Fearless in 1969. He was one of the two primary drafters of the Rhodesian Proclamation of Independence (Unilateral Declaration of Independence) and in recognition was granted one of fourteen copies which were countersigned by the original signatories. Notably copies for Leo Ross and Mr David William ICD, (Deputy Director of Information) were not signed by Minister William Harper who was later dismissed when he was discovered to be a mole for the British Government (Harper was the only signatory to the Proclamation not to be awarded the Independence Decoration).

As Secretary of Information Ross was responsible for implementing and maintaining press censorship between 1966 and 1969 when according to Rhys Meyer (editor of the Rhodesia Herald newspaper) he brokered a deal with the press to lift the censorship. As head of Immigration he promoted an active policy to attract qualified trades and professional people to Rhodesia, using the Ministry of Information to develop recruiting materials and films. Ross redefined the National Tourist Board and the Hotel Board to create international demand for the quality resorts developed around Victoria Falls, Lake Kariba, Zimbabwe Ruins (now referred to as Great Zimbabwe). Tourism and Immigration continued to grow through 1973 when following terrorist incidents, including the shooting of a tourist at Victoria Falls by guerrillas from the Zambian side, tourism began to decline.

The significance of his role during the Rhodesian Government was such that he was one of only seven civil servants to be awarded both the Independence Decoration (ID) and the Grand Officer of the Legion of Merit (GLM). There were also only six cabinet ministers who were awarded both medals.

== Family and early life ==
Born in Bulawayo, Southern Rhodesia, on July 24, 1910, Leo Ross was the youngest of ten children. His parents immigrated from Scotland after the Boer War in 1902. His father Donald was disabled in a vehicle accident when Leo was very young and the family depended upon the support of the older children. His older brothers Andrew and Donald were accomplished sportsmen of note. Andrew Ross won the Rhodesian Open Tennis Championship a record seven times and beat British Davis Cup number one Gordon Crole-Rees in an exhibition match in 1925. He was the first man in Rhodesia to run 100 yards in ten seconds in 1929. Leo was himself an accomplished tennis player and keen sportsman, and was a cadet officer and marksman in the Milton School Cadet Corp. He also played rugby and cricket for his school. Leo Ross suffered from peritonitis following a burst appendix in 1927 and was lucky to survive. He was ruled unfit for military service.

In 1928, he joined the Native Affairs Department where he excelled in language and customs for both Shona and Ndebele peoples. He demonstrated a keen interest and respect for the African cultures and was widely respected by the indigenous people with whom he worked.

== Awards ==
- Legion of Merit (Grand Officer - Civilian) (GLM)
- Independence Decoration (ID)
- Order of the British Empire (Member) (MBE) (Great Britain)
