= 1964 Rhodesian independence referendum =

- 5 November 1964
- Are you in favour of or against Southern Rhodesia obtaining independence on the basis of the Constitution of Southern Rhodesia 1961?

Results
Choice	Votes	%
Yes	58,176	90.51%
No	6,101	9.49%
Valid votes	64,277	98.52%
Invalid or blank votes	965	1.48%
Total votes	65,242	100.00%
Registered voters/turnout	105,444	61.87%

A referendum on independence was held in Rhodesia on 5 November 1964. The question put to voters was, "Are you in favour of or against Rhodesia obtaining independence on the basis of the 1961 Constitution of Rhodesia?" The result was a landslide for the "yes" vote, which was the choice of over 90% of voters, although less than 15% of the voter roll was black. Prime Minister Ian Smith called an indaba with tribal leaders to gauge support, resulting in universal support among the tribal leaders, but Britain did not consider this representative of the majority black population as the tribal leaders were in the pay of the government. The following year, Smith's government made a Unilateral Declaration of Independence, making the country a de facto independent state until returning to British colonial rule in 1979 following the Lancaster House Agreement. The British Government did not accept Rhodesian independence as they did not view the referendum as representative of all of Rhodesia.

Voter turnout was 62%.

== Results ==
Choice	Votes	%
For	58,176	90.51
Against	6,101	9.49
Total	64,277	100.00
Valid votes	64,277	98.52
Invalid/blank votes	965	1.48
Total votes	65,242	100.00
Registered voters/turnout	105,444	61.87
Source: African Elections Database
