= Ian Dillon =

Rhodesian politician

Ian Birt Harper Dillon, ID (born 18 April 1915) was a Rhodesian politician.

In 1958, he defeated former prime minister Garfield Todd, as a candidate for the Dominion Party.

He attended the signature of Rhodesia's Unilateral Declaration of Independence, but was not a signatory. He received the Independence Decoration in 1970.

He was Minister of Mines from 1969 to 1977, after suffering a heart attack.
