= Josiah Zion Gumede =

Zimbabwean politician; President of Zimbabwe-Rhodesia (1979)

The Honourable Josiah Zion Gumede GCLM MBE
- Josiah Zion Gumede

President of Zimbabwe Rhodesia
- In office 1 June 1979 – 12 December 1979
- Prime Minister: Abel Muzorewa
- Preceded by: Henry Everard as President of Rhodesia
- Succeeded by: Christopher Soames as Governor of Southern Rhodesia; Canaan Banana as President of Zimbabwe (1980)

Personal details
- Born: 19 September 1919 Bembesi, Southern Rhodesia
- Died: 28 March 1989 (aged 69) Zimbabwe
- Spouse: Esther Gumede
- Relations: Natalie Gumede (grandchild)
- Children: 4
- Occupation: School teacher, Politician, Diplomat
- Awards: Legion of Merit GCLM Order of the British Empire MBE

Josiah Zion Gumede GCLM MBE (19 September 1919 – 28 March 1989) was a Zimbabwean politician and statesman who served as the first and only president of the self-proclaimed, and internationally unrecognised, state of Zimbabwe Rhodesia during 1979, before Rhodesia briefly reverted to British rule until the country's independence as Zimbabwe in 1980.

== Biography ==
Josiah Gumede was born in Bembesi, in the Bubi District (now in Matabeleland North) of Southern Rhodesia. He was educated at the David Livingstone Memorial Mission and Matopo Mission before matriculating in the Cape Province (South Africa) in 1946. He taught at various mission and government schools and ended his teaching career as a headmaster. He was the assistant information and education attache for the Government of Rhodesia and Nyasaland at Rhodesia House in London between 1960 and 1962, before being appointed First Secretary in the office of the Commissioner for Rhodesia and Nyasaland in Nairobi. He then joined the Ministry of External Affairs (1963–1965).

He was at one time general secretary for the then African Teachers' Association of Rhodesia; a member of the Wankie Disaster Relief Fund's Board of Trustees; a director of the Tribal Trust Land Development Corporation; and a board member of the National Free Library of Rhodesia. He was also an ordained elder of the Presbyterian Church of South Africa.

Gumede was the grandfather of British television actress, Natalie Gumede.

== Awards ==
- Legion of Merit (Grand Commander - Civilian) (GCLM)
- Order of the British Empire (Member) (MBE)

Political offices
Preceded by Henry Everard (of Rhodesia)	President of Zimbabwe Rhodesia; 1979	Succeeded by Canaan Banana (of Zimbabwe)
