= President of Zimbabwe Rhodesia =

Head of state

- Flag of the president of Zimbabwe Rhodesia
- Style: The Honourable
- Residence: Government House, Salisbury (now Harare)
- Precursor: President of Rhodesia
- Formation: 1 June 1979
- First holder: Josiah Zion Gumede
- Final holder: Josiah Zion Gumede
- Abolished: 12 December 1979
- Superseded by: Governor of Southern Rhodesia

The president of Zimbabwe Rhodesia was the head of state of Zimbabwe Rhodesia. Like the country itself, it was never internationally recognized.

The only president of Zimbabwe Rhodesia was Josiah Zion Gumede.

== History of the office ==
The position was established on 1 June 1979, under the terms of the Internal Settlement negotiated between the government of Rhodesia and moderate African nationalists. It existed until, under the terms of the Lancaster House Agreement, control was turned over to Lord Soames as Governor of Southern Rhodesia on 12 December 1979.

== President of Zimbabwe Rhodesia (1979) ==
Parties

United African National Council

No.	Portrait	Name (Birth–Death)	Term of office			Political party	Cabinet
No.	Portrait	Name (Birth–Death)	Took office	Left office	Time in office	Political party	Cabinet
1	Josiah Zion Gumede	Josiah Zion Gumede (1919–1989)	1 June 1979	12 December 1979	194 days	UANC	Government

== See also ==
- Prime Minister of Zimbabwe Rhodesia
- Government of Zimbabwe Rhodesia
- President of Rhodesia
- President of Zimbabwe
