= Gerald B. Clarke =

Rhodesian politician

Gerald Bryan Sheil O'Cleary Clarke GCLM ID CMG ISO (1 November 1909 – 24 August 1981) was a Rhodesian civil servant.

== Biography ==
He was born in Gwelo as the son of Irish-Rhodesian parents, Francis Joseph Sheil O'Cleary Clarke and Margaret Shiel. His father arrived in Rhodesia in 1896 following a part played in the Jameson Raid, and became a Justice of the Peace in a long career of public service in Rhodesia that stretched for 38 years.

Gerald Clarke attended St. George's College, Bulawayo and left school there to join the Southern Rhodesian Civil Service in Salisbury in 1927, serving initially in the Treasury, until 1940. His government service spanned a 43-year career in a range of key appointments.

His time in the army during World War II lasted from 1940–45, and involved active service in East Africa and Abyssinia with the Southern Rhodesia Armoured Car Regiment, and then with the Pretoria Regiment 6th South Africa Armoured Division in Italy for the Allied forces.

On his return home, he became Chief Clerk, Treasury, 1945–48, then Assistant Secretary, Public Services Board, 1948, and Under-Secretary in the Cabinet Office in 1950.

He became Cabinet Secretary and Secretary to the Prime Minister in 1955 until 1970 for the Southern Rhodesia Government during and after Federation (1953–63), including for Garfield Todd, Sir Edgar Whitehead and Winston Field, and to Prime Minister to Rhodesia Ian Smith (Ian Smith) during the existence of the Rhodesian Front Government from 1964 until Clarke retired in 1970.

A close confidant of all these Rhodesian Prime Ministers, Gerald Clarke attended virtually every constitutional conference and heads-of-governments meeting, including negotiations held on HMS Tiger (December 1966) and HMS Fearless (1968) as Member of the Rhodesian Delegation. He was Commissioner of Oaths, Rhodesia, was awarded the Queen Elizabeth II Coronation Medal in 1953, and the Independence Decoration in 1970.

Following government service, he retired to Inyanga with his wife, Mary Eleanor (née McGarry), married in 1946, and who was the widow of Bruno C. Catella who had died at El Alamein, 1942, and he was a Member, Umtali Club. He had one stepson, Anthony John Bruno Catella, and one daughter, Barbara Anne Francis Clarke, and one son, Duncan Godfrey Clarke.

Clarke organised and ran the sub-committee that drew up the Unilateral Declaration of Independence, which Smith and his Cabinet signed on 11 November 1965.

== Awards ==
- Legion of Merit (Grand Commander - Civilian) (GCLM)
- Independence Decoration (ID)
- Order of St Michael and St George (Companion) (CMG)
- Imperial Service Order (Companion) (ISO)
