= Thomas Arnoldus Theron Bosman =

Rhodesian civil servant

Thomas Arnoldus Theron Bosman, GLM, ID, QC (born 20 February 1912) was a Rhodesian civil servant. He served as Solicitor-General, Attorney-General from 1962, and chairman of the Public Services Board.
