= Ernest Bulle =

Zimbabwean academic and politician (born 1936 died 1996)

Minister of Commerce and Industry of Zimbabwe Rhodesia
- In office 1 June 1979 – 12 December 1979
- Prime Minister: Abel Muzorewa
- Preceded by: Himself and David Smith (Rhodesia)
- Succeeded by: David Smith (Zimbabwe)

Minister of Finance of Rhodesia
- In office 11/12 April 1978 – 1 June 1979 Serving with David Smith
- Prime Minister: Ian Smith
- Succeeded by: David Smith (Zimbabwe Rhodesia)

Minister of Commerce and Industry of Rhodesia
- In office 11/12 April 1978 – 1 June 1979 Serving with David Smith
- Prime Minister: Ian Smith
- Succeeded by: Himself (Zimbabwe Rhodesia)

Personal details
- Born: Tjolotjo, Southern Rhodesia
- Party: United African National Council
- Education: University of Natal; University College of Rhodesia

Ernest Leonard Bulle (1936–16 January 1996) was an academic and politician who served as a minister in the governments of Rhodesia and Zimbabwe Rhodesia. He served in the cabinet of Rhodesia as joint Minister of Finance and Minister of Commerce and Industry alongside David Smith from 1978 to 1979 as part of the country's Internal Settlement. He continued as commerce minister in the government of Zimbabwe Rhodesia between June and December 1979. First elected to parliament in the 1979 Zimbabwe Rhodesia general election, he stood unsuccessfully in the 1980 general election, which set the membership of the first parliament of the independent Zimbabwe. Bulle was a member of the United African National Council and served as the party's second vice-president.

== Early life, education, and family ==
Bulle was born in Tjolotjo, Matabeleland, Southern Rhodesia. He came from the Ndebele people, but as an adult preferred English to the Ndebele language. He attended Goromonzi High School, before studying at the University of Natal, where he graduated in 1959 with a degree in social studies or economics. In the late 1960s, he became the first Ndebele postgraduate student of the African languages department of the University College of Rhodesia. He was married 3 times, and had two daughters and one son from his first marriage, one daughter from his second marriage, and two daughters from his last marriage.

== Career ==
After graduating from the University of Natal, Bulle worked for the Ministry of Commerce and Industry of the Federation of Rhodesia and Nyasaland. During that time, he also took a course in foreign trade and commercial policy in Brussels, Belgium, sponsored by the General Agreement on Tariffs and Trade. After briefly working in industry, Bulle worked for Rhodesia Railways, which operated in both Southern and Northern Rhodesia. He initially worked as a personnel officer or in the planning department. Later, he moved briefly to Zambia to work in the planning and manpower localisation section of Zambia Railways. He returned to Rhodesia in 1971 to take a position as lecturer in the African languages department at the University of Rhodesia.

== Politics ==
Bulle served as the second vice-president of the United African National Council, a political party led by Bishop Abel Muzorewa. After the signing of the Internal Settlement on 3 March 1978, Bulle was appointed joint Minister of Finance and Minister of Commerce and Industry the following 11/12 April, serving alongside co-minister David Smith. In October 1978, he announced on behalf of the government that "all discrimination" and racial segregation would be abolished in Rhodesia.

In the 1979 general election, he was elected to Parliament to represent Matabeleland North Province. On 31 May 1979, he was appointed by Muzorewa to serve the government of Zimbabwe Rhodesia as Minister of Commerce and Industry. Bulle was an unsuccessful UANC candidate in the 1980 general election. He later reentered politics in the 1990s, in opposition to the ruling ZANU–PF.
