= Douglas Lilford =

South African-born Rhodesian and Zimbabwean politician (1908–1985)

Douglas Collard 'Boss' Lilford, GLM (1908–1985) was a South African-born Rhodesian and Zimbabwean politician and farmer. A close friend and ally of Ian Smith, he was one of the founders of the Rhodesian Front in 1962.

== Biography ==
Born in Grahamstown, South Africa, Lilford came to Southern Rhodesia with his father as toddler in 1908. He was educated at the Plumtree School, and became a farmer and rancher.

A founder of the Rhodesian Front along with Ian Smith and Winston Field, Lilford was one of the RF's vice-presidents for some years, and was a key funder for the party.

Lilford was murdered by unknown assailants at his farm near Harare in November 1985. The attackers had bound his hands with wire and beaten him before shooting him to death. In an interview after his murder, Smith described Lilford as "my closest and greatest friend".

Standing at 6' 6", Lilford was known as 'Boss', "a boyhood nickname quite unconnected with the political use of the word".

== Family ==
Lilford was married to Doris Lilford. In 1966, his son Chesney Collard Lilford was sentenced to four months' imprisonment for beating an African.
