= Government of Zimbabwe Rhodesia =

The government of Zimbabwe Rhodesia took office on 1 June 1979, after an election held in April that year under the terms of the Internal Settlement negotiated between the government of Rhodesia and moderate African nationalists. This government ran the country from its capital, Salisbury (later renamed Harare in 1982). It ruled the internationally unrecognized country until, under the terms of the Lancaster House Agreement, control was turned over to Lord Soames as the Governor of Southern Rhodesia on 12 December 1979.

The government attempted to include all parties represented in the House of Assembly following the general election, although the Zimbabwe African National Union of Rev Ndabaningi Sithole initially refused to take up their seats.

== Executive Council ==
| Party key | Rhodesian Front |
| Party key | United African National Council |
| Party key | United National Federal Party |
| Party key | Zimbabwe African National Union – Ndonga |

| Portfolio | Minister | Term |
|---|---|---|
| Prime Minister | Abel Muzorewa | 1 June 1979 – 12 December 1979 |
| Minister of Combined Operations | Abel Muzorewa | 1 June 1979 – 12 December 1979 |
| Minister of Defence | Abel Muzorewa | 1 June 1979 – 12 December 1979 |
| Deputy Prime Minister | Silas Mundawarara | 1 June 1979 – 12 December 1979 |
| Minister of Information, Immigration and Tourism | Silas Mundawarara | 1 June 1979 – 12 December 1979 |
| Acting Minister of Health | Silas Mundawarara | 1 June 1979 – 15 August 1979 |
| Minister of Agriculture | William Irvine | 1 June 1979 – 12 December 1979 |
| Minister of Commerce and Industry | Ernest Bulle | 1 June 1979 – 12 December 1979 |
| Minister of Education | Edward Mazaiwana | 1 June 1979 – 12 December 1979 |
| Minister of Finance | David Smith | 1 June 1979 – 12 December 1979 |
| Minister of Foreign Affairs | David Mukome | 1 June 1979 – 12 December 1979 |
| Minister of Health | David Zamchiya | 15 August 1979 – 12 December 1979 |
| Minister of Home Affairs | Herbert Zimuto | 1 June 1979 – 12 December 1979 |
| Minister of Justice | Chris Andersen | 1 June 1979 – 12 December 1979 |
| Acting Minister of Roads and Road Traffic | Chris Andersen | 1 June 1979 – 15 August 1979 |
| Minister of Lands, Natural Resources and Rural Development | George Nyandoro | 1 June 1979 – 12 December 1979 |
| Minister of Law and Order | Francis Zindoga | 1 June 1979 – 12 December 1979 |
| Minister of Public Service | Francis Zindoga | 1 June 1979 – 12 December 1979 |
| Minister of Local Government and Housing | Walter Mthimkhulu | 1 June 1979 – 12 December 1979 |
| Minister of Manpower, Social Affairs, Youth and Rehabilitation | Senator Aaron Mutiti | 1 June 1979 – 12 December 1979 |
| Minister of Mines | Senator Chief Khayisa Ndiweni | 1 June 1979 – 12 December 1979 |
| Minister of Works | Senator Chief Khayisa Ndiweni | 1 June 1979 – 12 December 1979 |
| Minister of Posts | P. K. van der Byl | 1 June 1979 – 12 December 1979 |
| Minister of Transport and Power | P. K. van der Byl | 1 June 1979 – 12 December 1979 |
| Minister of Roads and Road Traffic | Leonard Nyemba | 15 August 1979 – 12 December 1979 |
| Minister of Water Development | Zephaniah Bafana | 1 June 1979 – 12 December 1979 |
| Minister without Portfolio | Ian Smith | 1 June 1979 – 12 December 1979 |

== Deputy Ministers ==
| Office | Minister | Since | Party |
|---|---|---|---|
| Deputy Minister of Information, Immigration and Tourism | Ismail Adam | 1 June 1979 – 30 September 1979 | Independent |
| Deputy Minister of Home Affairs | Joshua Buwell Cohen | 1 June 1979 – 30 September 1979 | Independent |
| Deputy Minister of Lands, Natural Resources and Rural Development | Rowan Cronjé | 1 June 1979 | RF |
| Deputy Minister of Agriculture | Dennis Nyamuswa (acting) | 1 June 1979 | UANC |
| Deputy Minister of Agriculture | Ephraim Tsvaringe | 15 August 1979 | ZANU |
| Deputy Minister of Education | Peter Mandaza | 1 June 1979 | UNFP |
| Deputy Minister of Manpower, Social Affairs, Youth and Rehabilitation | David Murambiwa Mutasa | 1 June 1979 | UANC |
| Deputy Minister of Finance | Dennis Nyamuswa | 1 June 1979 | UANC |
| Deputy Minister of Mines | Denis Walker | 1 June 1979 | RF |
| Deputy Minister of Works | Denis Walker | 1 June 1979 | RF |

== See also ==
- Cabinet of Rhodesia
- Politics of Zimbabwe
