= Stanley Morris (silversmith) =

British silversmith (1919–2010)

- Born: 30 November 1919; Handsworth, England
- Died: 31 October 2010 (aged 90); Gloucestershire, England
- Occupation: Silversmith

Stanley George Morris (30 November 1919 – 31 October 2010) was a British silversmith. His work was part of the painting event in the art competition at the 1948 Summer Olympics.

== Life and career ==
Morris was born in Handsworth, Birmingham. His father was also a jeweller, James (“Jas”) Morris, who worked closely with renowned metalworkers Arthur and Georgie Gaskin.

Stanley Morris studied at Moseley School of Art, then later in the Jewellery Quarter at the Vittoria Street School of Jewellery and Silversmithing. He won his entry on a scholarship in 1934, and he was tutored by Bernard Cuzner who at the time served as head of department for metalwork.

Morris and Cuzner received an Honourable Mention for their joint entry into the 1948 Olympic arts competition in the Painting, Applied arts category. The piece was titled ‘’Silver Symbolic Torch’’, and was commissioned by the Worshipful Company of Goldsmiths. It was made by Morris and engraved by William Biddle, a teacher at the school. The torch appears on the cover of the 1949 edition of Cuzner’s book, A Silversmith’s Manual.

Morris created work for the 1951 Festival of Britain, a ‘’Fluted Salt’’ based on a design by Cyril Shiner.

Perhaps his best known work is ‘’Crozier Head’’ which he made in 1938 when he was 19 years old, and for many years was on display at Birmingham Museums and Art Gallery.

After World War II he worked from a workshop at King Alfred’s Place in Birmingham close to Broad Street. The area was subsequently redeveloped to make way for the ICC Birmingham.

== Hallmark ==
Morris’ registered hallmark displays the characters ‘SGM’ in a serif typeface, then in later years in a sans serif typeface.
