= Stanley Ernest Morris =

Stanley Ernest 'Stan' Morris, GLM, ID, CMG was a Rhodesian civil servant and politician. He was Secretary for Internal Affairs until 1964, when he was replaced by Hostes Nicolle and appointed chairman of the Public Service Board, in a move perceived by some as intended to make way for supporters of the Rhodesian Front in the civil service in preparation for Rhodesia's unilateral declaration of independence.

Morris later took part in the negotiations on HMS Tiger in 1966 between the British and Rhodesian governments, then was appointed to the Senate of Rhodesia.
