= Ken Flower =

British born Rhodesian intelligence chief (1914–1987)

Ken Flower GLM ID
- Flower in 1979
- Born: 30 June 1914; Cornwall, England
- Died: 2 September 1987 (aged 73); Harare, Zimbabwe
- Occupation: Intelligence Service Head
- Espionage activity
- Allegiance: Rhodesia
- Service branch: Central Intelligence Organisation
- Service years: 1964–1981
- Rank: Director-General

Kenneth Flower GLM, ID (30 June 1914 – 2 September 1987) was a Rhodesian police officer and intelligence chief.

== Biography ==
Flower was born in Cornwall, England. After serving in British Somaliland and Ethiopia he returned to Rhodesia in 1948, rapidly rising in the hierarchy of the British South Africa Police (BSAP). He studied the Mau Mau insurgency in Kenya and applied his knowledge during the disturbances in British Nyasaland during the late 1950s.

Flower was appointed Deputy Commissioner of the BSAP in March 1961 and subsequently served as the first head of Rhodesia's Central Intelligence Organisation (CIO). The organisation had been set up by him under Prime Minister Winston Field in 1963, though the original initiative for such an agency had come from Field's predecessor, Sir Edgar Whitehead. Flower saw himself as non-political, though with a bias against the 'cowboy element' in the Rhodesian Front, as he dubbed it. Fay Chung claims that in March 1975, Flower ordered the assassination of Herbert Chitepo, then leader of the Zimbabwe African National Union. Flower masterminded the creation of RENAMO, a tribally-based guerrilla organization in Mozambique.

In 1980, when Robert Mugabe became the first Prime Minister of the state of Zimbabwe, he kept Flower as head of the CIO alongside other top officials in his predominantly black administration.

Flower wrote Serving Secretly: An Intelligence Chief on Record, Rhodesia into Zimbabwe 1964-1981, published in 1987.

== Controversy ==
There are allegations that after Ian Smith unilaterally declared Rhodesia independent, Flower maintained his allegiance to the British government and spied on the Smith administration for MI6. In 2011, the BBC Radio 4 programme Documents featured a testimony from Lord Owen who claimed Flower had been a British mole during his tenure as head of the CIO and that his disclosure of Rhodesian plans had enabled Mugabe to survive an assassination attempt.

== Awards ==
- Legion of Merit (Grand Officer - Civilian) (GLM)
- Independence Decoration (ID)
