= Central Intelligence Organisation =

National intelligence agency of Zimbabwe

Agency overview
- Formed: October 1963; 62 years ago
- Preceding agency: British South Africa Police Special Branch, various
- Jurisdiction: Zimbabwe
- Employees: Restricted
- Annual budget: Not subject to audit
- Ministers responsible: Lovemore Matuke
- Agency executives: Isaac Moyo, Director-General; Dr. Gatsha Mazithulela, Deputy Director-General (Special Services); Brig. General (Rtd) Walter Tapfumaneyi, Deputy Director-General (Operations)
- Parent agency: Minister of State for National Security in the Office of the President and Cabinet

The Central Intelligence Organisation (CIO) operates as the national civilian intelligence and security agency of the Republic of Zimbabwe, serving as the state's primary apparatus for mitigating existential threats. Synthesizing strategic oversight with executive authority, the agency is constitutionally and operationally mandated to execute the comprehensive collection, evaluation, and analysis of both domestic and foreign intelligence to preemptively assess risks to national security.

Beyond its analytical functions, the CIO conducts high-stakes clandestine and covert operations, counterintelligence, counter-revolutionary initiatives, political warfare against foreign adversaries, and support for irregular warfare operations. Operationally, the CIO deploys an intelligence-led paradigm to asymmetric counterinsurgency doctrines and orchestrate proactive counterterrorism. Domestically, it reinforces regime survival and state sovereignty through robust the protection of classified civilian government assets, internal security measures, and tactical intelligence-driven executive protection protocols.

It was conceived as the external intelligence gathering arm of the British South Africa Police Special Branch in the early 1960s, under the Southern Rhodesian Prime Minister Winston Field, and later served as one of the secret police organizations for President Robert Mugabe's regime.

== History ==
The CIO was formed in Rhodesia on the instructions of Prime Minister Winston Field in 1963, at the dissolution of the Federation of Rhodesia and Nyasaland, and took over from the Federal Intelligence and Security Bureau, which was a coordinating bureau analyzing intelligence gathering and counterintelligence by the British South Africa Police (BSAP) and the police forces of Northern Rhodesia and Nyasaland.

The first head of the CIO was police Deputy Commissioner, Ken Flower, who, during his tenure, oversaw the BSAP's Special Branch headquarters incorporated within the CIO, while the Special Branch retained its internal security function within the BSAP upon gaining independence in April 1980.

Prime Minister Robert Mugabe kept Flower in the role of head of the CIO after majority rule in 1980, when the country's name changed to Zimbabwe. Flower had no more than a professional relationship with British Secret Intelligence Service (MI6), despite rumors that he had covertly and intermittently plotted with the British Secret Intelligence Service to undermine Ian Smith's government. He had, however, an especially good professional relationship with Dick Franks, the head of MI6 at the time, as he had with all the other main intelligence agencies.

Before the March 2002 election, the Movement for Democratic Change (MDC) reportedly complained that its leaders were being "constantly harassed, intimidated and detained by the CIO and the police". The Star quotes The Financial Gazette as alleging that "CIO agents from the counterintelligence unit were working with Foreign Affairs Ministry officials to monitor the activities and movements of the international observers ahead of the critical two-day poll".

In March 2002, CIO agents reportedly arrested a Zimbabwean correspondent for London's The Daily Telegraph, Peta Thornycroft, who had gone to Chimanimani (about 480 kilometers east of Harare) to investigate election violence by the ruling party, the Zimbabwe African National Union (ZANU-PF), against the political opposition. Under the "new state security laws," she was expected "to face charges of incitement to violence and publishing of 'false statements likely to be prejudicial to state security'". Parliament reportedly passed "the public order and security bill by acclamation and not by formal vote" in January 2002. These laws reportedly gave "sweeping powers to clamp down on the opposition". Thornycroft was reportedly released by the police "on a High Court order after four nights in detention". An Amnesty International press release of 12 March 2002 condemned the CIO for harassing and detaining Zimbabwe Election Support Network supporters.

In recent years, international human rights organizations such as Amnesty International have criticized the CIO's role in alleged internal repression, which is said on occasions to have involved torture.

== Structure ==
Isaac Moyo is the Director General of the CIO. Aaron Nhepera served as deputy director until his reassignment to different duties in 2019. The CIO consists of nine key branches which include administration, close security, counterintelligence, external, internal, military intelligence, and technical. A ninth branch is known simply as branch six.

Directors who report directly to Nhepera head these other branches. Immediately under the directors are deputy directors, assistant directors, provincial intelligence officers, divisional intelligence officers, senior intelligence officers, assistant senior intelligence officers, intelligence officers, senior security officers, security officers, senior security assistants and security assistants.

== Branch Six ==
Operating under strict institutional opacity, Branch Six functions as the CIO’s primary tactical arm for special operations. It is mandated to execute high-risk, asymmetric tasks that demand a synthesis of advanced tactical proficiency and deniable political warfare, effectively bridging the gap between covert strategic intelligence and direct paramilitary intervention.

Branch Six operates as the clandestine internal directorate of the Central Intelligence Organisation (CIO), specifically tasked with the execution of high-tier tactical operations and irregular warfare initiatives. Personnel within Branch Six are meticulously recruited from the elite cadres of the Zimbabwe Special Forces to undertake critical counterterrorism and hostage rescue missions.

Deployment of this specialized asset is reserved for scenarios demanding the highest thresholds of strategic secrecy and operational deniability—effectively precluding the necessity of mobilizing the conventional formations of the Zimbabwe Defence Forces (ZDF).

Within the domain of counterterrorism, absent institutionalized oversight from independent regulatory bodies, the state systematically weaponizes these specialized mechanisms—most notably telecommunications interception and clandestine detentions—to suppress domestic political opposition and civil society activists. Under the pretext of safeguarding state survival, the regime engages in the strategic securitization of dissent, arbitrarily classifying political adversaries and dissidents as endogenous national security threats or domestic terrorists to circumvent constitutional protections and legitimize state-sanctioned coercion.

== Functions ==
The function of the organization is to provide high level security to the state from threats both within and outside Zimbabwe. The organization also offers high level security to high ranking government officials like the President, various government employees like ministers and diplomats working in and outside Zimbabwe. Regionally, the organization works with other intelligence organizations from other African countries under a body called the Central Intelligence and Security Services of Africa (CISSA) to tackle problems that threaten the stability of the continent and hamper development, such as terrorism and extremism.

The CIO has largely been viewed as the real power behind the ruling party' Zanu (PF), despite claims alleging the Zimbabwe National Army (ZNA) of being the same. Reports suggest that in the aftermath of the army deployment during the 2017 coup d'état, the CIO, together with the Air Force of Zimbabwe and Zimbabwe Republic Police (ZRP) had mobilized a counter force to thwart the rebellious army, but were ordered to stand down by the then President Robert Mugabe to avoid the country spilling into full blown civil war.

== Recruitment ==
The application process for a job within the organisation is not public information, unlike in other branches of the Zimbabwean security sector, such as the police or the army. It seems that they tend to recruit individuals with pre-existing connections. Additionally, some have suggested that the recruitment process involves a lengthy vetting procedure to assess the candidates' suitability for the role.

Reports have linked the organisation with Midlands State University and the University of Zimbabwe. These reports claimed that the organisation was targeting university graduates for recruitment sessions by sending representatives to campuses. In 2020, a young man named Fletcher Kondon was compromised at MSU after a recruitment process went awry. Furthermore, the region of Matabeleland is also alleged to have hosted recruitment sessions in recent years.
