= Indaba =

Conference of the Zulu and Xhosa of South Africa

An indaba (/ɪnˈdɑːbə/; Xhosa pronunciation: [íⁿd̥a̤ːɓa]) is an important conference held by the izinDuna (principal men) of the Zulu and Xhosa peoples of South Africa. (Such meetings are also practised by the Swazi, who refer to them using the close cognate indzaba.) Indabas may include only the izinDuna of a particular community, or they may be held with representatives of other communities.

The term "Indaba" comes from the Zulu and Xhosa languages. It means "business" or "matter".

== Usage ==
The term is used by various organisations around the world for their meetups or conferences; for instance, the Wiki Indaba, South African Tourism's Africa's Travel Indaba and Canonical's Ubuntu Indaba.
