= Rhodesia's Unilateral Declaration of Independence =

1965 statement

Unilateral Declaration of Independence
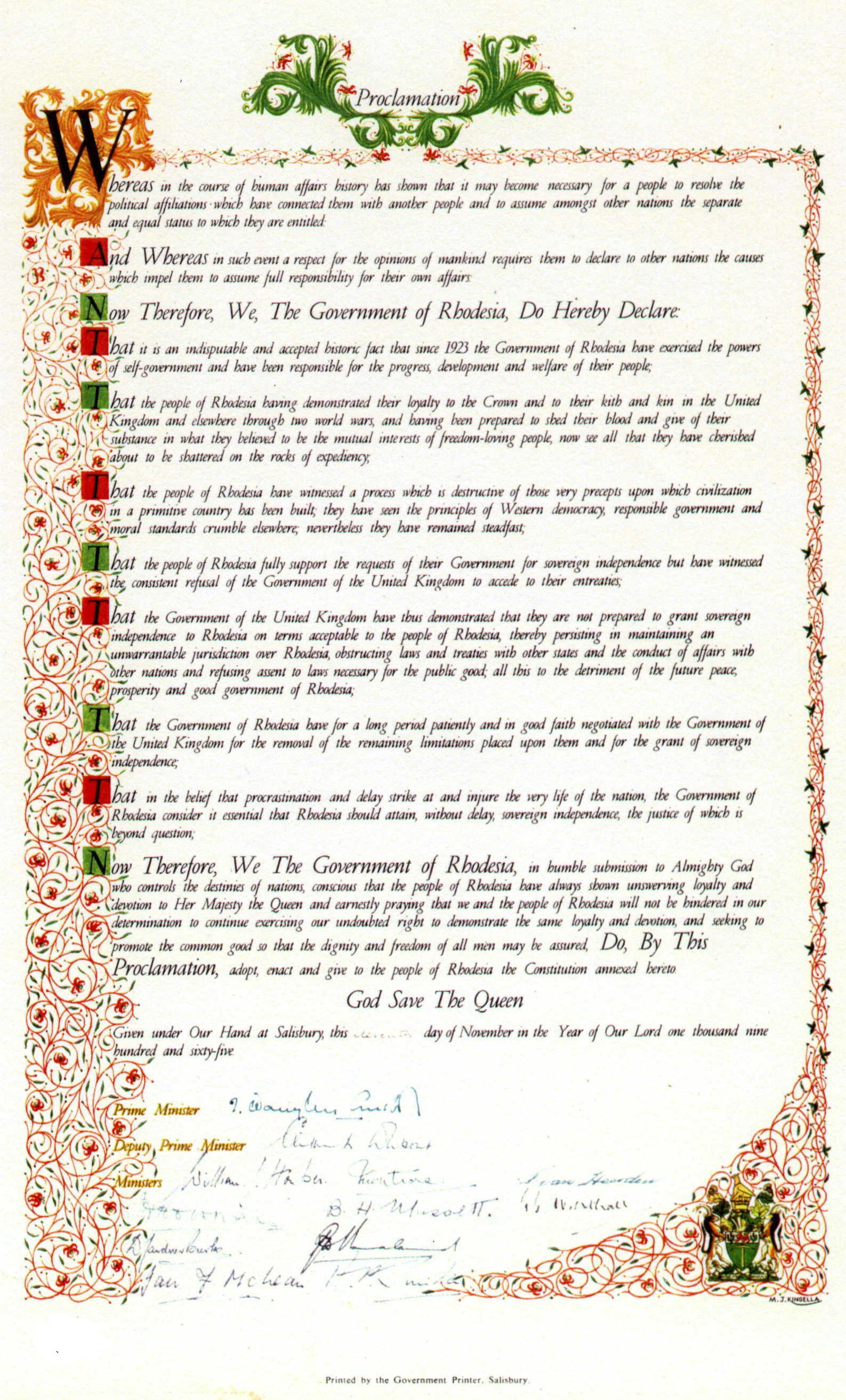
- A scan of the proclamation document
- Created: November 1965
- Ratified: 11 November 1965
- Location: Salisbury, Rhodesia (Note: Renamed Zimbabwe in 1980. The official name of the colony under British law was Southern Rhodesia, but the colonial government switched to using the name Rhodesia in October 1964, when Northern Rhodesia changed its name to Zambia concurrently with its independence from Britain.)
- Author: Gerald B. Clarke et al.
- Signatories: Ian Smith, Prime Minister; Clifford Dupont, Deputy Prime Minister; Other Cabinet ministers
- Purpose: To announce and explain unilateral separation from the United Kingdom

Full text
- Unilateral Declaration of Independence at Wikisource

Rhodesia's Unilateral Declaration of Independence (UDI) was a statement adopted by the Cabinet of Rhodesia on 11 November 1965, announcing that Rhodesia (previously known as Southern Rhodesia), a British crown colony in southern Africa that had governed itself since 1923, now regarded itself as an independent sovereign state. The culmination of a protracted dispute between the British and Rhodesian governments regarding the terms under which the latter could become fully independent, it was the first unilateral break from the United Kingdom by one of its colonies since the United States Declaration of Independence in 1776. The UK, the Commonwealth, and the United Nations all deemed Rhodesia's UDI illegal, and economic sanctions, the first in the UN's history, were imposed on the breakaway colony. With the help of the Commonwealth Secretariat, members of the Commonwealth were able to cooperate and advise Rhodesian Africans on policy. Amid near-complete international isolation, Rhodesia continued as an unrecognised state with the assistance of South Africa and (until 1974) Portugal.

The Rhodesian government, which mostly comprised members of the country's white minority of about 5%, was indignant when, amid the UK colonial government's Wind of Change policies of decolonisation, African colonies to the north without comparable experience of self-rule quickly advanced to independence during the early 1960s while Rhodesia was refused sovereignty under the newly ascendant principle of "no independence before majority rule" ("NIBMAR"). Most white Rhodesians felt that they were due independence following four decades of self-government, and that the British government was betraying them by withholding it.

A stalemate developed between the British and Rhodesian prime ministers, Harold Wilson and Ian Smith respectively, between 1964 and 1965. The dispute largely surrounded the British condition that the terms for independence had to be acceptable "to the people of the country as a whole"; Smith contended that this was met, while the UK and African Nationalist Rhodesian leaders held that it was not. After Wilson proposed in late October 1965 that the UK might safeguard future black representation in the Rhodesian parliament by withdrawing some of the colonial government's devolved powers, then presented terms for an investigatory Royal Commission that the Rhodesians found unacceptable, Smith and his Cabinet declared independence. Calling this treasonous, the British colonial governor, Sir Humphrey Gibbs, formally dismissed Smith and his government, but they ignored him and appointed an "Officer Administering the Government" to take his place.

While no country recognised the UDI, the Rhodesian High Court deemed the post-UDI government legal and de jure in 1968. The Smith administration initially professed continued loyalty to Queen Elizabeth II, but abandoned this in 1970 when it declared a republic in an unsuccessful attempt to win foreign recognition. The Rhodesian Bush War, a guerrilla conflict between the government and two rival communist-backed black Rhodesian groups, began in earnest two years later, and after several attempts to end the war Smith concluded the Internal Settlement with non-militant nationalists in 1978. Under these terms the country was reconstituted under black rule as Zimbabwe Rhodesia in June 1979, but this new order was rejected by the guerrillas and the international community. The Bush War continued until Zimbabwe Rhodesia revoked its UDI as part of the Lancaster House Agreement in December 1979. Following a brief period of direct British rule, the country was granted internationally recognised independence under the name Zimbabwe in 1980.

== Background ==
Southern Rhodesia (or Rhodesia), highlighted in red on a map of Africa

The southern African territory of Rhodesia, officially Southern Rhodesia, was a unique case in the British Empire and Commonwealth: although a colony in name, it was internally self-governing and constitutionally not unlike a dominion. This situation dated back to 1923, when it was granted responsible government within the empire as a self-governing colony, following three decades of administration and development by the British South Africa Company. Britain had intended Southern Rhodesia's integration into the Union of South Africa as a new province, but this having been rejected by registered voters in the 1922 government referendum, the territory was moulded into a prospective dominion instead. It was empowered to run its own affairs in almost all respects, including defence. (Note: Powers reserved to the British government at Whitehall under the 1923 constitution concerned foreign affairs, alterations to the constitution, the British-appointed Governor's salary, and bills regarding native administration, mining revenues and railways. Laws relevant to these subjects had to receive assent from the Governor (and, by extension, Whitehall), but all other bills could be passed by Salisbury without interference.)

Whitehall's powers over Southern Rhodesia under the 1923 constitution were, on paper, considerable; the British Crown was theoretically able to cancel any passed bill within a year, or alter the constitution however it wished. These reserved powers were intended to protect the indigenous black Africans from discriminatory legislation and to safeguard British commercial interests in the colony, but as Claire Palley comments in her constitutional history of the country, it would have been extremely difficult for Whitehall to enforce such actions, and attempting to do so would have probably caused a crisis. In the event, they were never exercised. A generally co-operative relationship developed between Whitehall and the colonial government and civil service in Salisbury, and dispute was rare.

The 1923 constitution was drawn up in non-racial terms, and the electoral system it devised was similarly open, at least in theory. Voting qualifications regarding personal income, education and property, similar to those of the Cape Qualified Franchise, were applied equally to all, but since most blacks did not meet the set standards, both the electoral roll and the colonial parliament were overwhelmingly from the white minority of about 5%. The result was that black interests were sparsely represented if at all, something that most of the colony's whites showed little interest in changing; they claimed that most blacks were uninterested in Western-style political process and that they would not govern properly if they took over. Bills such as the Land Apportionment Act of 1930, which earmarked about half of the country for white ownership and residence while dividing the rest into black purchase, tribal trust and national areas, were variously biased towards the white minority. White settlers and their offspring provided most of the colony's administrative, industrial, scientific and farming skills, and built a relatively balanced, partially industrialised market economy, boasting strong agricultural and manufacturing sectors, iron and steel industries and modern mining enterprises. Everyday life was marked by discrimination ranging from job reservation for whites to petty segregation of trains, post office queues and the like. Whites owned most of the best farmland, and had far superior education, wages and homes, but the schooling, healthcare, infrastructure and salaries available to black Rhodesians were nevertheless very good by African standards.

In the wider Imperial context, Southern Rhodesia occupied a category unto itself because of the "special quasi-independent status" it held. The Dominions Office, formed in 1925 to handle British relations with the dominions of Australia, Canada, New Zealand, Newfoundland, South Africa and the Irish Free State (the Statute of Westminster 1931 delineated the rights of the dominions more clearly in that year), also dealt with Southern Rhodesia, and Imperial Conferences included the Southern Rhodesian Prime Minister alongside those of the dominions from 1932. This unique arrangement continued following the advent of Commonwealth Prime Ministers' Conferences in 1944. Southern Rhodesians of all races fought for Britain in the Second World War, and the colonial government gradually received more autonomy regarding external affairs. During the immediate post-war years, Southern Rhodesian politicians generally thought that they were as good as independent as they were, and that full autonomy in the form of dominionship would make little difference to them. Post-war immigration to Southern Rhodesia, mainly from Britain, Ireland and South Africa, caused the white community to swell from 68,954 in 1941 to 221,504 in 1961. The black population grew from 1,400,000 to 3,550,000 over the same period. Rhodesian authorities actively promoted immigration and reproduction of whites to boost their numbers while encouraging family planning for blacks to curtail their numbers. They hoped that by altering the demographic content of the territory enough they could have a stronger position from which to petition the British government for more autonomy.

=== Federation and the Wind of Change ===
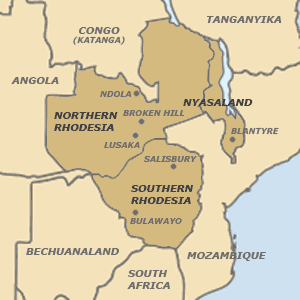
The Federation of Rhodesia and Nyasaland (1953–63)

Believing full dominion status to be effectively symbolic and "there for the asking", Prime Minister Godfrey Huggins (in office from 1933 to 1953) twice ignored British overtures hinting at dominionship, and instead pursued an initially semi-independent Federation with Northern Rhodesia and Nyasaland, two colonies directly administered from London. He hoped that this might set in motion the creation of one united dominion in south-central Africa, emulating the Federation of Australia half a century before. (Note: The original vision shared by Huggins and his Northern Rhodesian counterpart Sir Roy Welensky was a unitary amalgamation of the two Rhodesias that would eventually become a dominion. British politicians rejected this idea, asserting that black Northern Rhodesians would never accept it, but agreed to consider a Federation on the condition that neighbouring Nyasaland was also included.) The Federation of Rhodesia and Nyasaland, defined in its constitution as indissoluble, began in 1953, mandated by the results of a mostly white referendum, with Southern Rhodesia, the most developed of the three territories, at its head, Huggins as Federal Prime Minister and Salisbury as Federal capital. (Note: Southern Rhodesian politicians from various parties later claimed that had Federation not occurred, Southern Rhodesia would have been a dominion by 1955.)

Coming at the start of the decolonisation period, the federation of self-governing Southern Rhodesia with two directly ruled British protectorates was later described by the British historian Robert Blake as "an aberration of history—a curious deviation from the inevitable course of events". The project faced black opposition from the start, and ultimately failed because of the shifting international attitudes and rising black Rhodesian ambitions of the late 1950s and early 1960s, often collectively called the Wind of Change. Britain, France and Belgium vastly accelerated their withdrawal from Africa during this period, believing colonial rule to be no longer sustainable geopolitically or ethically. The idea of "no independence before majority rule", commonly abbreviated to "NIBMAR", gained considerable ground in British political circles. When Huggins (who had been recently ennobled as Lord Malvern) asked Britain to make the Federation a dominion in 1956, he was rebuffed. The opposition Dominion Party responded by repeatedly calling for a Federal unilateral declaration of independence (UDI) over the next few years. Following Lord Malvern's retirement in late 1956, his successor Sir Roy Welensky pondered such a move on at least three occasions. (Note: With Northern Rhodesia and Nyasaland under direct British control, a Federal UDI would have been far more complicated and difficult to execute than one by Southern Rhodesia alone. Indeed, it was partly because of this that Welensky deemed it infeasible.)

Attempting to advance the case for Southern Rhodesian independence, particularly in the event of Federal dissolution, the Southern Rhodesian Prime Minister Sir Edgar Whitehead brokered the 1961 constitution with Britain, which he thought would remove all British powers of reservation over Southern Rhodesian bills and acts, and put the country on the brink of full sovereignty. Despite its containing no independence guarantees, Whitehead, Welensky and other proponents of this constitution presented it to the Southern Rhodesian electorate as the "independence constitution" under which Southern Rhodesia would become a dominion on a par with Australia, Canada and New Zealand if the Federation dissolved. White dissenters included Ian Smith, MP for Gwanda and Chief Whip for the governing United Federal Party (UFP) in the Federal Assembly, who took exception to the constitution's omission of an explicit promise of Southern Rhodesian independence in the event of Federal dissolution, and ultimately resigned his post in protest. A referendum of the mostly white electorate approved the new constitution by a majority of 65% on 26 July 1961. The final version of the constitution included a few extra provisions inserted by the British, one of which—Section 111—reserved full powers to the Crown to amend, add to or revoke certain sections of the Southern Rhodesian constitution by Order in Council at the request of the British government. This effectively negated the relinquishment of British powers described elsewhere in the document, but the Southern Rhodesians did not initially notice it.

The black Rhodesian movement in Southern Rhodesia, founded and organised by urban black elites during the late 1950s, was repeatedly banned by the colonial government because of the political violence, industrial sabotage and intimidation of potential black voters that characterised its campaign. The principal nationalist group, led by the Bulawayo trade unionist Joshua Nkomo, renamed itself with each post-ban reorganisation, and by the start of 1962 was called the Zimbabwe African People's Union (ZAPU). (Note: Zimbabwe, derived from the name applied by the Shona people to the ancient ruined city today referred to as Great Zimbabwe, was adopted by the black Rhodesian movement between 1960 and 1962 as their preferred name for a majority-ruled Southern Rhodesia. ZAPU was banned by the Whitehead administration in 1962 because of its violent activities, but it continued operating nevertheless, publicly calling itself the People's Caretaker Council (PCC). Several prominent members left to form the rival Zimbabwe African National Union (ZANU) in 1963. ZANU and ZAPU were respectively backed by China and the Soviet Union, and influenced to various degrees by Chinese Maoism and Soviet Marxism–Leninism. Following an escalation in internecine political violence between the two movements, a spate of industrial sabotage and civil disobedience and the politically motivated killing of a white man, Petrus Oberholzer, by ZANU insurgents, both PCC and ZANU were banned by Smith's government in August 1964, with most of each party's leaders concurrently jailed for criminal offences or otherwise restricted. Both movements thereafter based themselves overseas.) Attempting to win black political support, Whitehead proposed a number of reforms to racially discriminatory legislation, including the Land Apportionment Act, and promised to implement these if his UFP won the next Southern Rhodesian election. Intimidation by ZAPU of prospective black voters impeded the UFP's efforts to win their support and caused low turnout, but regardless, the UFP won 14 of 15 primarily black seats in the December 1962 Southern Rhodesian election. However, much of the white community saw Whitehead as too radical, and soft on what they saw as black extremism. As a result, the UFP was soundly defeated in the primarily white seats by the Rhodesian Front (RF), a newly formed alliance of conservative voices headed by Winston Field and Ian Smith, in what was widely considered a shock result. Field became Prime Minister, with Smith as his deputy.

=== Federal dissolution; the roots of mistrust ===
Meanwhile, secessionist black Rhodesian parties won electoral victories in Northern Rhodesia and Nyasaland, and Harold Macmillan's Conservative administration in Britain moved towards breaking up the Federation, resolving that it had become untenable. In February 1962, the British Secretary of State for Commonwealth Relations, Duncan Sandys, secretly informed the Nyasaland nationalist leader Hastings Banda that secession would be allowed. A few days later, he horrified Welensky by telling him that "we British have lost the will to govern". "But we haven't", retorted Julian Greenfield, Welensky's Law Minister. (Note: Welensky was so shaken by Sandys' statement that he suffered a migraine. Lord Alport, the UK's High Commissioner to the Federation, reportedly left the meeting and vomited.) Macmillan's Deputy Prime Minister and First Secretary of State, R. A. Butler, who headed British oversight of the Federation, officially announced Nyasaland's right to secede in December 1962. Four months later, he informed the three territories that he was going to convene a conference to decide the Federation's future.

As Southern Rhodesia had been the UK's legislative partner in forming the Federation in 1953, it would be impossible (or at least very difficult) for Britain to dissolve the union without Southern Rhodesia's co-operation. Field could therefore potentially hamstring the British by refusing to attend the conference until they pledged to grant his country full independence. According to Field, Smith and other RF politicians, Butler made several such guarantees orally to ensure their co-operation at the conference, but repeatedly refused to give anything on paper. (Note: In particular, Field and Smith claimed that Butler told them at Victoria Falls on 27 June 1963 that in return for their help in winding up the Federation, Southern Rhodesia would be granted "independence no later than, if not before, the other two territories ... in view of your country's wonderful record of Responsible Government over the past forty years ... and above all the great loyalty you have always given to Britain in time of war".) The Southern Rhodesians claimed that Butler justified his refusal to give a written promise by saying that binding Whitehall to a document rather than his word would be against the Commonwealth's "spirit of trust"—an argument that Field eventually accepted. "Let's remember the trust you emphasised", Smith warned, according to Field's account wagging his finger at Butler; "if you break that you will live to regret it." Southern Rhodesia attended the conference, which was held at Victoria Falls over a week starting from 28 June 1963, and among other things it was agreed to formally liquidate the Federation at the end of the year. In the House of Commons afterwards, Butler flatly denied suggestions that he had "oiled the wheels" of Federal dissolution with secret promises to the Southern Rhodesians.

Field's government was startled by Britain's announcement in October 1963 that Nyasaland would become fully independent on 6 July 1964. While no date was set for Northern Rhodesian statehood, it was generally surmised that it was going to follow shortly thereafter. Smith was promptly sent to London, where he held a round of inconclusive Southern Rhodesian independence talks with the new British Prime Minister, Sir Alec Douglas-Home. (Note: Douglas-Home was only a few days into his premiership following Macmillan's resignation on grounds of ill health. At one point during the meeting on 31 October 1964 he told Smith that though he opposed unilateral action, he felt Southern Rhodesia could "declare herself independent, [and] would be within her rights to do so". Scandalised, British civil servants withheld record of this comment from their Southern Rhodesian counterparts.) Around the same time, the presence and significance of Section 111 of the 1961 constitution emerged in Southern Rhodesia, prompting speculation in political circles that a future British government might, if it were so inclined, go against previous conventions by legislating for Salisbury without its consent, withdrawing devolved powers or otherwise altering the Southern Rhodesian constitution. Fearing what the Labour Party might do if it won the next British general election (which was projected for late 1964), the Southern Rhodesians stepped up their efforts, hoping to win independence before Britain went to the polls, and preferably not after Nyasaland. The Federation dissolved as scheduled at the end of 1963.

== Positions and motivations ==
=== British government stance ===
The British government's refusal to grant independence to Southern Rhodesia under the 1961 constitution was largely the result of the geopolitical and moral shifts associated with the Wind of Change, coupled with the UK's wish to avoid opprobrium and loss of prestige in the United Nations (UN) and the Commonwealth. The issue gained international attention in Africa and worldwide as a flashpoint for questions of decolonisation and racism. By the early 1960s, general consensus in the post-colonial UN—particularly the General Assembly, where the communist bloc and the Afro-Asian lobby were collectively very strong—roundly denounced all forms of colonialism, and supported communist-backed black nationalist insurgencies across southern Africa, regarding them as racial liberation movements. Amid the Cold War, Britain opposed the spread of Soviet and Chinese influence into Africa, but knew it would become an international pariah if it publicly expressed reservations or backed down on NIBMAR in the Southern Rhodesia question. Once the topic of Southern Rhodesia came to the fore in the UN and other bodies, particularly the Organisation of African Unity (OAU), even maintaining the status quo became regarded as unacceptable internationally, causing the UK government a great deal of embarrassment.

In the Commonwealth context, too, Britain knew that simply granting independence to Southern Rhodesia was out of the question as many of the Afro-Asian countries were also Commonwealth members. Statehood for Salisbury without majority rule would split the Commonwealth and perhaps cause it to break up, a disastrous prospect for British foreign policy. The Commonwealth repeatedly called on Britain to intervene directly should Southern Rhodesian defiance continue, while liberals in Britain worried that if left unchecked Salisbury might drift towards South African-style apartheid. Anxious to avoid having to choose between Southern Rhodesia and the Commonwealth, Whitehall attempted to negotiate a middle way between the two, but ultimately put international considerations first, regarding them as more important.

At party level, the Labour Party, in opposition until October 1964, was overtly against Southern Rhodesian independence under the 1961 constitution and supportive of the black Rhodesian movement on ideological and moral grounds. The Liberal Party, holding a handful of parliament seats, took a similar stance. The Conservative Party, while also following a policy of decolonisation, was more sympathetic to the Southern Rhodesian government's position, and included members who openly supported it. (Note: In particular, a small but vocal phalanx of stridently pro-Salisbury Conservative peers emerged in the House of Lords, including Robert Gascoyne-Cecil, 5th Marquess of Salisbury (after whose grandfather the Southern Rhodesian capital was named), Richard Law, 1st Baron Coleraine and Robert Grimston, 1st Baron Grimston of Westbury. Together with an ancillary group of similarly minded Conservative MPs in the Commons, headed by Major Patrick Wall, these became referred to as the "Rhodesia Lobby".)

=== Southern Rhodesian government view ===
The Southern Rhodesian government found it bizarre that Britain was making independent states out of Northern Rhodesia and Nyasaland, which the Rhodesians considered to be less developed territories with little experience of self-rule, while withholding sovereign statehood from Southern Rhodesia, the Federation's senior partner, which had already been self-governing for four decades and which was one of the most prosperous and developed countries in Africa. The principle of majority rule, the basis for this apparent inconsistency, was considered irrelevant by the Southern Rhodesians. They had presumed that in the event of Federal dissolution they would be first in line for independence without major adjustments to the 1961 constitution, an impression confirmed to them by prior intergovernmental correspondence, particularly the oral promises they claimed to have received from Butler. When it did not prove forthcoming they felt cheated. Salisbury contended that its predominantly white legislature was more deserving of independence than the untried black Rhodesian leaders as it had proven its competence over decades of self-rule.

The RF claimed that the bloody civil wars, military coups and other disasters that plagued the new majority-ruled African states to the north, many of which had become corrupt, autocratic or communist one-party states very soon after independence, showed that black Rhodesian leaders were not ready to govern. Influenced strongly by the white refugees who had fled south from the Congo, it presented chaotic doomsday scenarios of what black Rhodesian rule in Southern Rhodesia might mean, particularly for the white community. Proponents of the RF stand downplayed black Rhodesian grievances regarding land ownership and segregation, and argued that despite the racial imbalance in domestic politics—whites made up 5% of the population, but over 90% of registered voters—the electoral system was not racist as the franchise was based on financial and educational qualifications rather than ethnicity. They emphasised the colony's proud war record on Britain's behalf, and expressed a wish in the Cold War context to form an anti-communist, pro-Western front in Africa alongside South Africa and Portugal.

These factors combined with what RF politicians and supporters saw as British decadence, chicanery and betrayal to create the case they put forward that UDI, while dubious legally and likely to provoke international uproar, might nevertheless be in their eyes justifiable and necessary for the good of the country and region if an accommodation could not be found with Whitehall.

== Road to UDI ==
=== First steps, under Field ===
Field's failure to secure independence concurrently with the end of the Federation caused his Cabinet's support for him to waver during late 1963 and early 1964. The RF caucus in January 1964 revealed widespread dissatisfaction with him on the grounds that the British seemed to be outwitting him. The Prime Minister was put under immense pressure to win the colony's independence. Field travelled to England later that month to press Douglas-Home and Sandys for independence, and raised the possibility of UDI on a few occasions, but returned empty-handed on 2 February.

The RF united behind Field after Sandys wrote him a terse letter warning him of the likely Commonwealth reaction to a declaration of independence, but the Prime Minister then lost his party's confidence by failing to pursue a possible route to at least de facto independence devised by Desmond Lardner-Burke, a lawyer and RF MP for Gwelo. During March 1964, the Legislative Assembly in Salisbury considered and passed Lardner-Burke's motion that the Governor, Sir Humphrey Gibbs, should submit a petition to the Queen requesting alteration of Section 111 of the 1961 constitution so that the Royal Assent described therein would be exercised at the request of the Southern Rhodesian government rather than that of its British counterpart. This would both remove the possibility of British legislative interference and pave the way for an attempted assumption of independence by Order in Council. (Note: The Lardner-Burke bill proposed that a two-thirds majority in the Legislative Assembly would prompt automatic consent for alterations from the Governor, who would then sign them into law on behalf of the Queen. William Harper, the Minister of Water Development and Roads, posited that if this passed, Salisbury would be able to proclaim an independent republic outside the Commonwealth with a two-thirds majority in parliament.)

The RF's intention was partly to test whether or not the British would attempt to block this bill after Gibbs had granted Royal Assent to it, but this issue never came to a head because Sandys persuaded Field not to forward it to Gibbs for ratification on the grounds that it had not been unanimously passed. Lord Salisbury, one of Southern Rhodesia's main supporters in Britain, despaired at Field's lack of action, telling Welensky that as he saw it "the simple time to have declared independence, whether right or wrong, would have been when the Federation came to an end". The RF hierarchy interpreted this latest backtrack by Field as evidence that he would not seriously challenge the British on the independence issue, and forced his resignation on 13 April 1964. Smith accepted the Cabinet's nomination to take his place.

=== Smith replaces Field; talks with Douglas-Home ===
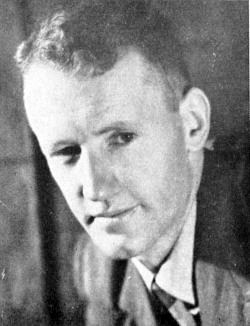
Ian Smith replaced Winston Field as Southern Rhodesian Prime Minister in April 1964, and pledged to challenge Britain on independence.

Smith, a farmer from the Midlands town of Selukwe who had been seriously wounded while serving in the British Royal Air Force during the Second World War, was Southern Rhodesia's first native-born Prime Minister. (Note: Roy Welensky, who held the Federal premiership from 1956 to dissolution in 1963, was also born in Southern Rhodesia. Before Smith, Southern Rhodesia had had seven Prime Ministers, three of whom (including Field) had been born in Britain. The country's first two Prime Ministers, Charles Coghlan (1923–27) and Howard Moffat (1927–33), were respectively born in South Africa and Bechuanaland, while Garfield Todd (1953–58) was originally from New Zealand. Edgar Whitehead (1958–62) was born at the British Embassy in Germany, where his father was a diplomat.) Regarded in British political circles as a "raw colonial"—when he took over, Smith's personal experience of the UK comprised four brief visits—he promised a harder line than Field in independence talks. The RF's replacement of Field drew criticism from the British Labour Party, whose leader Harold Wilson called it "brutal", while Nkomo described the new Smith Cabinet as "a suicide squad ... not interested in the welfare of all the people but only in their own". Smith said he was pursuing a middle course between black Rhodesian rule and apartheid so that there would still be "a place for the white man" in Southern Rhodesia; this would benefit the blacks too, he claimed. He held that the government should be based "on merit, not on colour or nationalism", and insisted that there would be "no African nationalist government here in my lifetime".

Salisbury's blunt refusal to be part of the Wind of Change caused the Southern Rhodesian military's traditional British and American suppliers to impose an informal embargo, and prompted Whitehall and Washington to stop sending Southern Rhodesia financial aid around the same time. (Note: Britain told Southern Rhodesia that this was because the British economy was in trouble. When Salisbury pointed out that the UK was still giving aid to other countries, Whitehall implied that financial assistance might resume if progress was made towards an independence settlement acceptable to Britain.) In June 1964, Douglas-Home informed Smith that Southern Rhodesia would not be represented at the year's Commonwealth Prime Ministers' Conference, despite Salisbury's record of attendance going back to 1932, (Note: Salisbury attended under the Federal flag from 1953 to 1963.) because of a change in policy to only include representatives from fully independent states. This decision, taken by Britain to preempt the possibility of open confrontation with Asian and black African leaders at the conference, deeply insulted Smith. Lord Malvern equated Britain's removal of Southern Rhodesia's conference seat with "kicking us out of the Commonwealth", while Welensky expressed horror at what he described as "this cavalier treatment of a country which has, since its creation, staunchly supported, in every possible way, Britain and the Commonwealth".

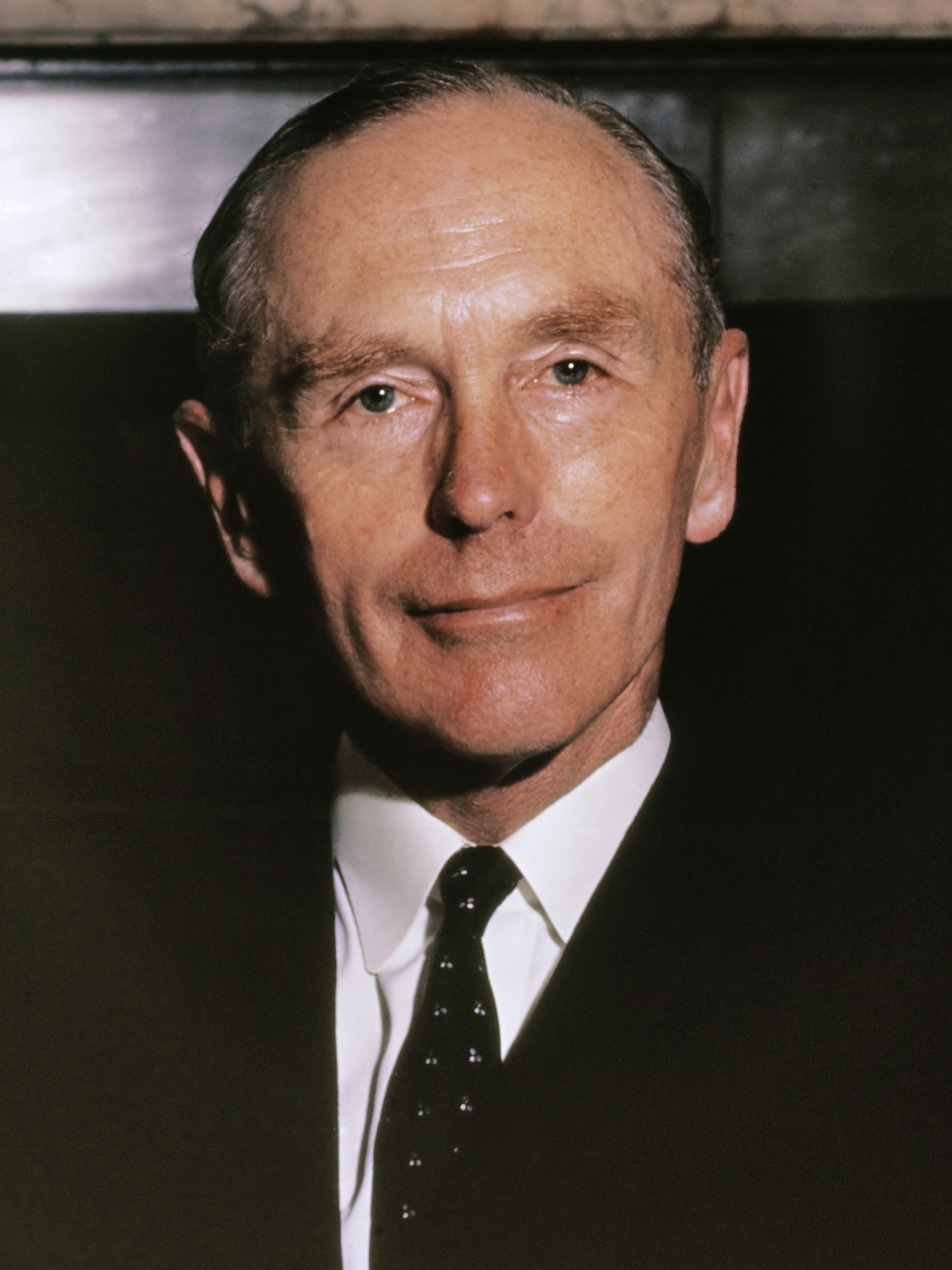
UK Prime Minister Sir Alec Douglas-Home met Smith in London in September 1964.

At 10 Downing Street in early September 1964, impasse developed between Douglas-Home and Smith over the best way to measure black public opinion in Southern Rhodesia. A key plank of Britain's Southern Rhodesia policy was that the terms for independence had to be "acceptable to the people of the country as a whole"—agreeing to this, Smith suggested that white and urban black opinion could be gauged through a general referendum of registered voters, and that rural black views could be obtained at a national indaba (tribal conference) of chiefs and headmen. Douglas-Home told Smith that although this proposal satisfied him personally, he could not accept it as he did not believe the Commonwealth, the United Nations or the Labour Party would also do so. He stressed that such a move towards accommodation with Smith might hurt the Conservatives' chances in the British general election the next month, and suggested that it might be in Smith's best interests to wait until after the election to continue negotiations. Smith accepted this argument. Douglas-Home assured Smith that a Conservative government would settle with him and grant independence within a year.

Attempting to form a viable white opposition to the Rhodesian Front, the UFP resurrected itself around Welensky, renamed itself the Rhodesia Party, and entered the Arundel and Avondale by-elections that had been called for 1 October 1964. Perturbed by the prospect of having to face the political heavyweight Welensky in parliament at the head of the opposition, the RF poured huge resources into winning both of these former UFP safe seats, and fielded Clifford Dupont, Smith's deputy, against Welensky in Arundel. (Note: During the bitterly fought campaign, Welensky was falsely personified by his opponents as representing appeasement of Britain and black extremists, and heckled at public concourses with cries of "communist", "traitor" and "coward"; one man even screamed "you bloody Jew" at Welensky during a debate.) The RF won both seats comfortably, and the Rhodesia Party soon faded away. Spurred on by this success, Smith organised the indaba for 22 October, and called a general independence referendum for 5 November 1964. Meanwhile, Wilson wrote a number of letters to black Southern Rhodesians, assuring them that "the Labour Party is totally opposed to granting independence to Southern Rhodesia so long as the government of that country remains under the control of the white minority".

=== Wilson's Labour government; Salisbury's tests of opinion ===
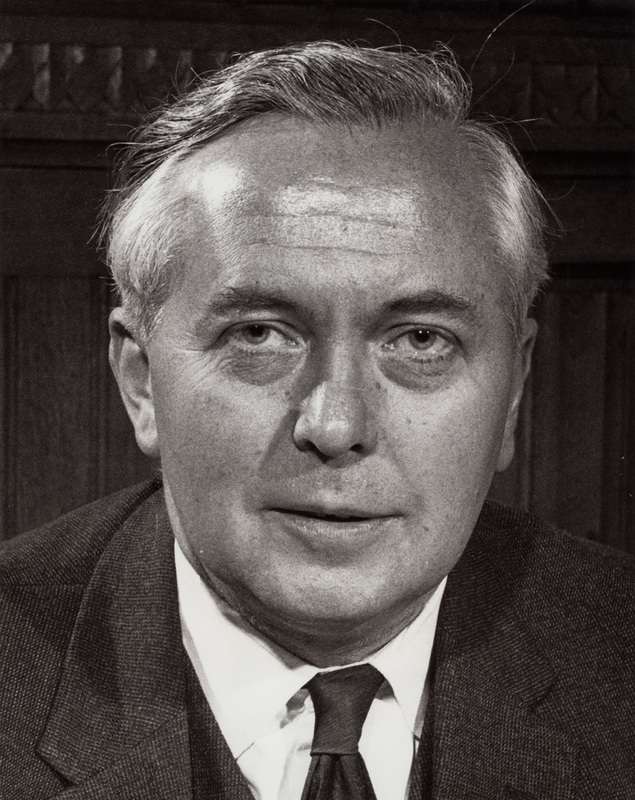
Harold Wilson replaced Douglas-Home in October 1964, and proved a formidable opponent of Smith.

Labour defeated the Conservatives by four seats in the British general election on 15 October 1964, and formed a government the next day. Both Labour and the Conservatives told Smith that a positive result at the indaba would not be recognised by Britain as representative of the people, and the Conservatives turned down Salisbury's invitation to send observers. Smith pressed on, telling parliament that he would ask the tribal chiefs and headmen "to consult their people in the traditional manner", then hold the indaba as planned. On 22 October 196 chiefs and 426 headmen from across the country gathered at Domboshawa, just north-east of Salisbury, and began their deliberations. Smith hoped that Britain, having taken part in such indabas in the past, might send a delegation at the last minute, but none arrived, much to his annoyance, particularly as the British government's Commonwealth Secretary Arthur Bottomley was only across the Zambezi in Lusaka at the time. (Note: Official observers came from Australia, Austria, France, Greece, New Zealand, Norway, Portugal, South Africa and Sweden.)

While the chiefs conferred, Northern Rhodesia became independent Zambia on 24 October 1964, emulating Nyasaland, which had achieved statehood as Malawi three months earlier. Reasoning that it was no longer necessary to refer to itself as "Southern" in the absence of a northern counterpart, Southern Rhodesia began calling itself simply Rhodesia. (Note: Salisbury passed legislation to shorten the name, but Britain ruled this ultra vires as the laws naming the country were British acts passed at Westminster. Salisbury went on using the shortened name in an official manner anyway, while the British government, the United Nations and other overseas bodies continued referring to the country as Southern Rhodesia. This situation continued throughout the UDI period.) The same day, the commander of the Rhodesian Army, Major-General John "Jock" Anderson, resigned, announcing publicly that he was forced to do so because of his opposition to UDI, which he said he could not go along with because of his oath of allegiance to the Queen. Interpreting this as a sign that Smith intended to declare independence if a majority backed it in the referendum, Wilson wrote a stiff letter to Smith on 25 October, warning him of the consequences of UDI, and demanding "a categorical assurance forthwith that no attempt at a unilateral declaration of independence on your part will be made". Smith expressed confusion as to what he had done to provoke this, and ignored it.

When the indaba ended on 26 October, the chiefs and headmen returned a unanimous decision to support the government's stand for independence under the 1961 constitution, attesting in their report that "people who live far away do not understand the problems of our country". This verdict was rejected by the nationalist movement on the grounds that the chiefs received governmental salaries; the chiefs countered that the black MPs in parliamentary opposition also received such salaries, but still opposed the government. Malvern, who was becoming perturbed by the RF's actions, dismissed the indaba as a "swindle", asserting that the chiefs no longer had any real power; the British simply ignored the whole exercise. On 27 October, Wilson released a firm statement regarding Britain's intended response to UDI, warning that Rhodesia's economic and political ties with Britain, the Commonwealth and most of the world would be immediately severed amid a campaign of sanctions if Smith's government went ahead with UDI. This was intended to discourage white Rhodesians from voting for independence in the referendum, for which the RF campaign slogan was "Yes means Unity, not UDI". Wilson was pleased when Douglas-Home, his leading opponent in the House of Commons, praised the statement as "rough but right". On 5 November 1964, Rhodesia's mostly white electorate voted "yes" to independence under the 1961 constitution by a margin of 89%, (Note: Turnout was 61% of the 105,444 registered voters (89,886 whites, 12,729 blacks and 2,829 coloureds and Asians). There were 58,091 ballots in favour, 6,096 against and 944 spoilt papers. Most eligible non-whites reportedly abstained.) prompting Smith to declare that the British condition of acceptability to the people as a whole had been met.

=== Stalemate develops between Smith and Wilson ===
Smith wrote to Wilson the day after the referendum, asking him to send Bottomley to Salisbury for talks. Wilson replied that Smith should instead come to London. The British and Rhodesians exchanged often confrontational letters for the next few months. Alluding to the British financial aid pledged to Salisbury as part of the Federal dissolution arrangements, Wilson's High Commissioner in Salisbury, J B Johnston, wrote to the Rhodesian Cabinet Secretary Gerald B. Clarke on 23 December that "talk of a unilateral declaration of independence is bound to throw a shadow of uncertainty on the future financial relations between the two governments". Smith was furious, seeing this as blackmail, and on 13 January 1965 wrote to Wilson: "I am so incensed at the line of your High Commissioner's letter that I am replying directly to you ... It would appear that any undertakings given by the British government are worthless ... such immoral behaviour on the part of the British government makes it impossible for me to continue negotiations with you with any confidence that our standards of fair play, honesty and decency will prevail."

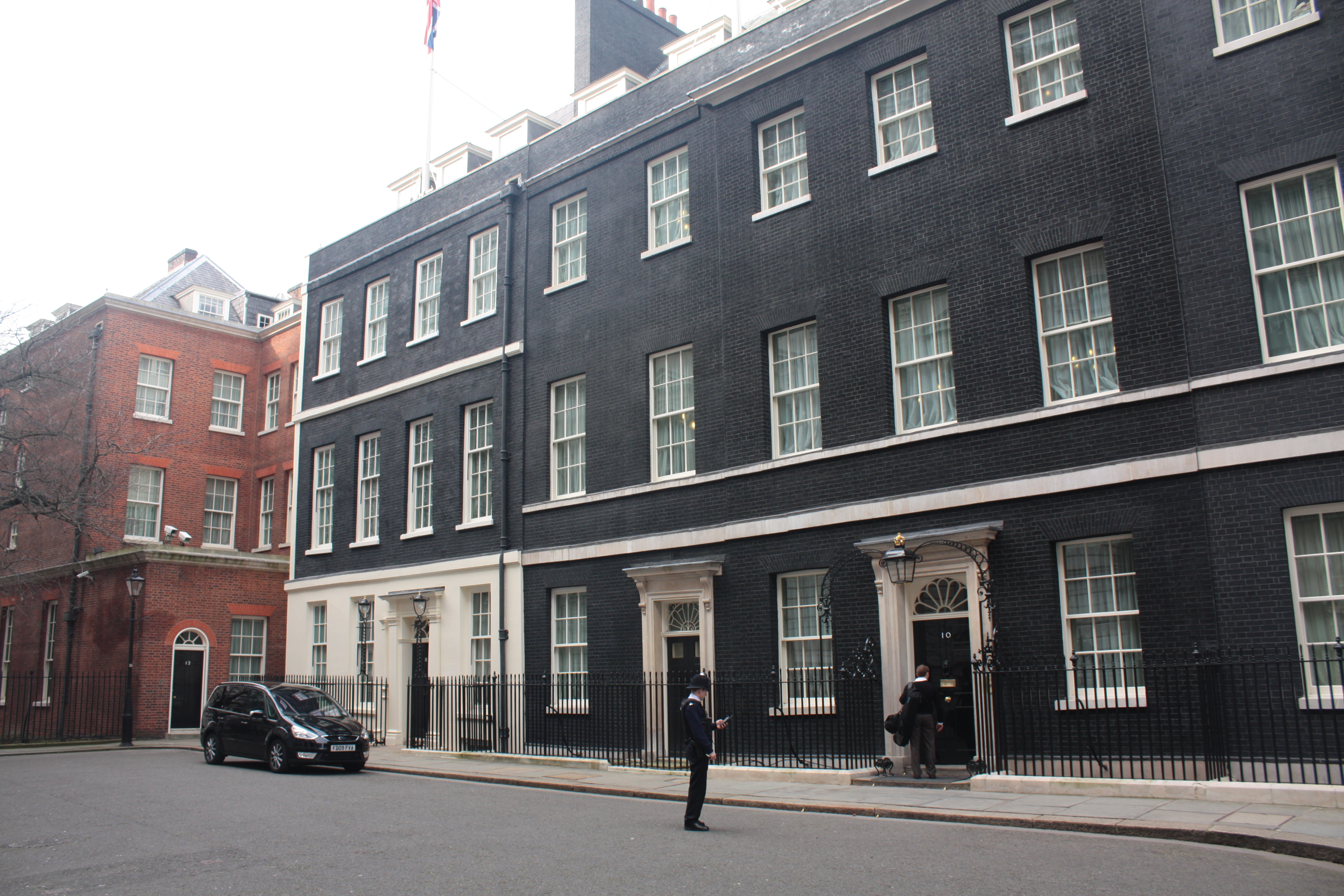
10 Downing Street, where Wilson received Smith in January 1965

The two premiers were brought together in person in late January 1965, when Smith travelled to London for Sir Winston Churchill's funeral. Following an episode concerning Smith's non-invitation to a luncheon at Buckingham Palace after the funeral—noticing the Rhodesian's absence, the Queen sent a royal equerry to Smith's hotel to retrieve him, reportedly causing Wilson much irritation—the two prime ministers inconclusively debated at 10 Downing Street. They differed on most matters, but agreed on a visit to Rhodesia the next month by Bottomley and the Lord Chancellor, Lord Gardiner, to gauge public opinion and meet political and commercial figures. Bottomley and Gardiner visited Rhodesia from 22 February to 3 March, collected a wide cross-section of opinions, including some from black Rhodesians, and on returning to Britain reported to the House of Commons that they were "not without hope of finding a way towards a solution that will win the support of all communities and lead to independence and prosperity for all Rhodesians". Bottomley also condemned black-on-black political violence, and dismissed the idea of introducing majority rule through military force.

The RF called a new general election for May 1965 and, campaigning on an election promise of independence, won all 50 "A"-roll seats (the voters for which were mostly white). (Note: The electoral system devised in the 1961 constitution replaced the common voters' roll with two rolls, the "A" roll and the "B" roll, the latter of which had lower qualifications intended to make it easier for prospective voters to enter the political system. There were 50 "A"-roll constituencies and 15 larger "B"-roll districts, with a complicated mechanism of "cross-voting" allowing "B"-roll voters to slightly influence "A"-roll elections and vice versa. This system was theoretically non-racial, but in practice the "A" roll was largely white and the "B" roll was almost all black.) Josiah Gondo, leader of the United People's Party, became Rhodesia's first black Leader of the Opposition. Opening parliament on 9 June, Gibbs told the Legislative Assembly in his speech from the throne that the RF's strengthened majority amounted to "a mandate to lead the country to its full independence", and announced that the new government had informed him of its intent to open its own diplomatic mission in Lisbon, separate from the British embassy there. The British and Rhodesians argued about this unilateral act by Salisbury, described by the historian J R T Wood as the "veritable straw in the wind", alongside the independence issue until Portugal accepted the mission in late September, much to Britain's fury and Rhodesia's delight. Hoping to bring Smith to heel by stonewalling him, Wilson's ministers deliberately delayed and frustrated the Rhodesian government in negotiations. Rhodesia was again excluded from the Commonwealth Prime Ministers' Conference in 1965. The UK's refusal of aid, the Lisbon mission, the informal arms embargo and other issues combined with this to cause the Rhodesian government's sense of alienation from Britain and the Commonwealth to deepen. In his memoirs, Smith accused the British of "resorting to politics of convenience and appeasement". Wilson, meanwhile, became exasperated by what he saw as Rhodesian inflexibility, describing the gap between the two governments as "between different worlds and different centuries".

=== Final steps to UDI ===
Wilson: "We are not giving up. Too much is at stake ... I know I speak for everyone in these islands, all parties, all our people, when I say to Mr Smith, 'Prime Minister, think again'."
Smith: "After 43 years of proving our case we are told that we cannot be master in our own house. Is it not incredible that the British government has allowed our case to deteriorate into this fantastic position? ... I believe I should say to Mr Wilson: 'Prime Minister, think again!'"

— -- Wilson and Smith called on each other through televised statements to "think again" on 13 October 1965

Amid renewed rumours of an impending Rhodesian UDI, Smith travelled to meet Wilson in London at the start of October 1965, telling the press that he intended to resolve the independence issue once and for all. Both the British and the Rhodesians were surprised by the large numbers of Britons who came out to support Smith during his visit. Smith accepted an invitation from the BBC to appear on its Twenty-Four Hours evening news and current affairs programme, but Downing Street blocked this at the last minute. Following largely abortive talks with Wilson, the Rhodesian prime minister flew home on 12 October. Desperate to avert UDI, Wilson travelled to Salisbury two weeks later to continue negotiations.

During these discussions, Smith referred to the last resort of a UDI on many occasions, though he said he hoped to find another way out of the quandary. He offered to increase black legislative representation by expanding the electorate along the lines of "one taxpayer, one vote"—which would enfranchise about half a million, but still leave most of the nation voteless—in return for a grant of independence. Wilson said this was insufficient, and countered that future black representation might be better safeguarded by Britain's withdrawal from the colonial government of the power it had held since 1923 to determine the size and makeup of its parliament. The Rhodesians were horrified by this prospect, particularly as Wilson's suggestion of it seemed to them to have removed the failsafe alternative of keeping the status quo. Before the British prime minister left Rhodesia on 30 October 1965, he proposed a Royal Commission to gauge public opinion in the colony regarding independence under the 1961 constitution, possibly chaired by the Rhodesian Chief Justice Sir Hugh Beadle, which would report its findings to both the British and Rhodesian Cabinets. Wilson confirmed in the House of Commons two days later that he intended to introduce direct British control over the Rhodesian parliamentary structure to ensure that progress was made towards majority rule.

Stalemate drew closer as the Rhodesian Cabinet resolved that since Wilson had ruled out maintenance of the status quo, its only remaining options were to trust in the Royal Commission or declare independence. When the terms for the commission's visit were presented to Smith, he found that contrary to what had been discussed during the British prime minister's visit, the Royal Commission would operate on the basis that the 1961 constitution was unacceptable to the British government, and that Britain would not commit itself to accepting the final report. Smith said these conditions amounted to a "vote of no confidence in [the commission] before they commenced", and therefore rejected them. "The impression you left with us of a determined effort to resolve our constitutional problem has been utterly dissipated", he wrote to Wilson on 5 November. "It would seem that you have now finally closed the door which you publicly claimed to have opened."

Amid frantic efforts by Beadle and others on both sides to revive the Royal Commission, the Rhodesian government had Gibbs announce a state of emergency the same day on the grounds that black Rhodesian insurgents were reportedly entering the country. Smith denied that this foreshadowed a declaration of independence, but the publishing of his letter to Wilson in the press provoked a worldwide storm of speculation that UDI was imminent. Smith wrote again to Wilson on 8 November, asking him to appoint the Royal Commission under the terms they had agreed in Salisbury and to commit the British government to accepting its ruling, but Wilson did not immediately reply. On 9 November, the Rhodesian Cabinet sent a letter to Queen Elizabeth II, assuring her that Rhodesia would remain loyal to her personally "whatever happens".

== Draft, adoption and signing ==
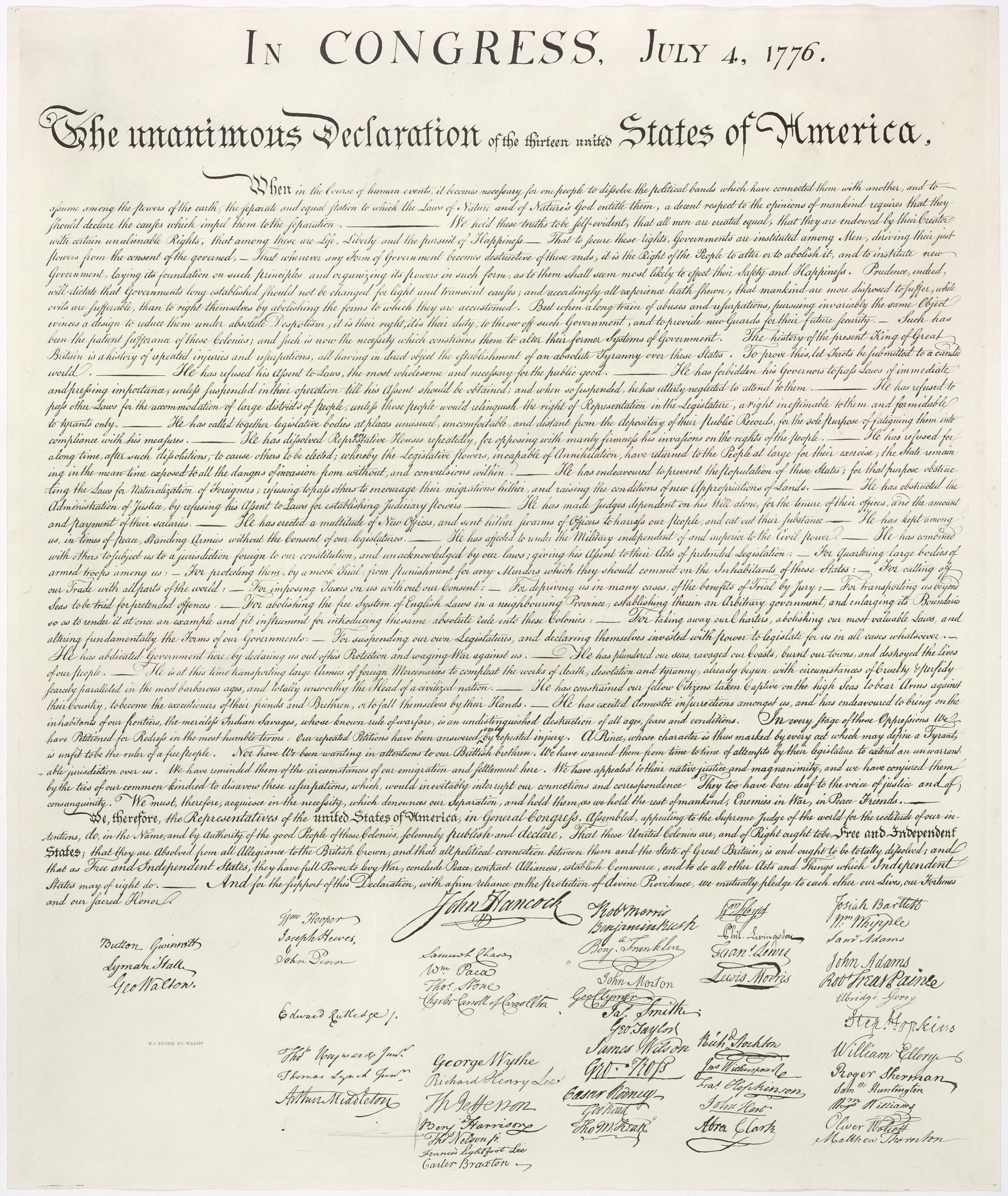
The United States Declaration of Independence was used by the Rhodesians as the model for their UDI.

The Rhodesian Minister for Justice and Law and Order, Desmond Lardner-Burke, presented the rest of the Cabinet with a draft for the declaration of independence on 5 November 1965. When Jack Howman, Minister of Tourism and Information, said that he was also preparing a draft, the Cabinet decided to wait to see his version too. The ministers agreed that if an independence proclamation were issued, they would all sign it. On 9 November, the Cabinet jointly devised an outline for the proclamation document and the accompanying statement to be made by Smith. The final version of the declaration of independence was prepared by a sub-committee of civil servants headed by Gerald Clarke, the Cabinet Secretary, with the United States Declaration of Independence of 1776, the only other such proclamation ever issued by British colonials, used as a model. Strongly alluding to Thomas Jefferson's text throughout, the Rhodesians used one phrase verbatim—"a respect for the opinions of mankind"—but no reference was made to the assertion that "all men are created equal", nor to the "consent of the governed", two omissions later stressed by a number of commentators.

Attached to the declaration of independence was a copy of the 1961 constitution amended for the circumstances, which became the 1965 constitution. In the eyes of the Smith administration, this document removed Whitehall's remaining authority over Rhodesia and made Rhodesia a de jure independent state. However, the Smith government still professed loyalty to Elizabeth II, and accordingly the document reconstituted Rhodesia as a Commonwealth realm with Elizabeth as "Queen of Rhodesia". The new constitution created the concept of allegiance to the "Constitution of Rhodesia", and introduced the post of Officer Administering the Government, a viceregal figure empowered to sign passed legislation into law on behalf of the monarch if she did not appoint a Governor-General.

The Rhodesian Cabinet waited in vain for Wilson's reply for the rest of 9 November and the next day. After briefly meeting Smith late on 10 November, Johnston warned Wilson that evening that the Rhodesians seemed poised to declare independence in the morning. The British prime minister tried repeatedly to call Smith, but did not get through until Smith was already chairing a Cabinet meeting on the independence issue around 08:00 Central Africa Time (06:00 in London) on 11 November. Wilson attempted to talk Smith out of unilateral action by telling him the status quo could continue, and the two argued inconclusively about the proposed Royal Commission. Returning to his Cabinet meeting, Smith reported the conversation to his ministers, and, after debating for a while, the Cabinet came to the conclusion that Wilson was simply attempting to buy more time and that there was no sign of actual progress. Smith asked if Rhodesia should declare its independence, and had each Cabinet minister answer in turn. According to Smith's account, "each one, quietly but firmly, without hesitation, said: 'Yes'."

At 11:00 local time on 11 November 1965, Armistice Day, during the traditional two minutes' silence to remember the fallen of the two World Wars, Smith declared Rhodesia independent and signed the proclamation document, with Dupont and the other 10 ministers of the Cabinet following. The timing was intended to emphasise the sacrifices Rhodesia had made for Britain in wartime. As Ken Flower later said, "the rebellion was made to appear as though it was not a rebellion". Smith and his ministers still pledged allegiance to Queen Elizabeth II, whose official portrait hung prominently behind them as they signed; the declaration even ended "God Save The Queen". Four junior members of the Cabinet—Lance Smith, Ian Dillon, Andrew Dunlop and P. K. van der Byl—did not sign, but were included in the official photograph.

== Text of the declaration ==
Proclamation

Whereas in the course of human affairs history has shown that it may become necessary for a people to resolve the political affiliations which have connected them with another people and to assume amongst other nations the separate and equal status to which they are entitled:

And Whereas in such event a respect for the opinions of mankind requires them to declare to other nations the causes which impel them to assume full responsibility for their own affairs:

Now Therefore, We, The Government of Rhodesia, Do Hereby Declare:

That it is an indisputable and accepted historic fact that since 1923 the Government of Rhodesia have exercised the powers of self-government and have been responsible for the progress, development and welfare of their people;

That the people of Rhodesia having demonstrated their loyalty to the Crown and to their kith and kin in the United Kingdom and elsewhere through two world wars, and having been prepared to shed their blood and give of their substance in what they believed to be the mutual interests of freedom-loving people, now see all that they have cherished about to be shattered on the rocks of expediency;

That the people of Rhodesia have witnessed a process which is destructive of those very precepts upon which civilization in a primitive country has been built, they have seen the principles of Western democracy, responsible government and moral standards crumble elsewhere, nevertheless they have remained steadfast;

That the people of Rhodesia fully support the requests of their government for sovereign independence but have witnessed the consistent refusal of the Government of the United Kingdom to accede to their entreaties;

That the Government of the United Kingdom have thus demonstrated that they are not prepared to grant sovereign independence to Rhodesia on terms acceptable to the people of Rhodesia, thereby persisting in maintaining an unwarrantable jurisdiction over Rhodesia, obstructing laws and treaties with other states and the conduct of affairs with other nations and refusing assent to laws necessary for the public good, all this to the detriment of the future peace, prosperity and good government of Rhodesia;

That the Government of Rhodesia have for a long period patiently and in good faith negotiated with the Government of the United Kingdom for the removal of the remaining limitations placed upon them and for the grant of sovereign independence;

That in the belief that procrastination and delay strike at and injure the very life of the nation, the Government of Rhodesia consider it essential that Rhodesia should attain, without delay, sovereign independence, the justice of which is beyond question;

Now Therefore, We The Government of Rhodesia, in humble submission to Almighty God who controls the destinies of nations, conscious that the people of Rhodesia have always shown unswerving loyalty and devotion to Her Majesty the Queen and earnestly praying that we and the people of Rhodesia will not be hindered in our determination to continue exercising our undoubted right to demonstrate the same loyalty and devotion, and seeking to promote the common good so that the dignity and freedom of all men may be assured, Do, By This Proclamation, adopt, enact and give to the people of Rhodesia the Constitution annexed hereto;

God Save The Queen

Given under Our Hand at Salisbury, this eleventh day of November in the Year of Our Lord one thousand nine hundred and sixty-five.

- Prime Minister: Ian Smith
- Deputy Prime Minister: Clifford Dupont
- Ministers: William Harper, Montrose, Phillip van Heerden, Jack Howman, Jack Mussett, John Wrathall, Desmond Lardner-Burke, George Rudland, Ian McLean, Arthur Philip Smith

== Announcement and reactions ==
=== Announcement ===
Prompted by the government, the Rhodesian Broadcasting Corporation told the public to stand by for an important announcement from the Prime Minister at 13:15 local time. Smith went first to Government House to inform Gibbs that his Cabinet had declared independence, then to Pockets Hill Studios in east Salisbury to announce UDI to the nation. He read the proclamation aloud, then stated that independence had been declared because it had become "abundantly clear that it is the policy of the British government to play us along with no real intention of arriving at a solution which we could possibly accept ... I promised the people of this country that I would continue to negotiate to the bitter end and that I would leave no stone unturned in my endeavours to secure an honourable and mutually accepted settlement; it now falls to me to tell you that negotiations have come to an end".

Smith said that he believed that he would be remiss in his duty if he allowed Rhodesia to continue to "drift in its present paralysing state of uncertainty", and that following Britain's abandonment of the Federation his government was determined that "the same will never be allowed to happen here". He claimed that UDI did not mark "a diminution in the opportunities which our African people have to advance and prosper in Rhodesia", described "racial harmony in Africa" as part of his agenda and condemned black Rhodesian activities as attempts to "blackmail the British government into ... handing the country over to irresponsible rule". He then attempted to assuage fears that economic sanctions might destroy the economy, and asked Rhodesians to stand firm: "The mantle of the pioneers has fallen on our shoulders ... In the lives of most nations there comes a moment when a stand has to be made for principles, whatever the consequences. This moment has come to Rhodesia ... the first Western nation in the last two decades to say 'so far and no further'." He concluded with an assertion that the declaration of independence was "a blow for the preservation of justice, civilisation and Christianity".

=== Domestic reactions ===
The front page of The Rhodesia Herald's 12 November 1965 edition. The blank spaces are where content was removed by state censors.

By the time Smith and Dupont arrived at Government House to see Gibbs, Whitehall had instructed the Governor to formally dismiss Smith and his ministers for treason. Gibbs complied without hesitation. Smith and his ministers ignored this, holding that under the new 1965 constitution Gibbs "no longer ha[d] any executive powers in Rhodesia", and his reserve power to sack them no longer existed. The Rhodesian government hoped that Gibbs might obligingly resign in light of his impotent situation, but he did not; following orders from London, he remained at his post at Government House. Gibbs told the Rhodesian military's senior officers, some of whom were troubled by the perceived choice between Queen and country, to remain at their posts to maintain law and order. He also refused some Army officers' requests for a warrant to arrest Smith. Wilson briefly flirted with the idea of sending Lord Mountbatten to Rhodesia to support Gibbs as a direct representative of the Queen, but this was dropped after Gibbs asked for somebody "higher up" in the royal family instead. "Not likely", Wilson retorted. Prince Philip was suggested by diplomats to be appointed as Governor-General so he could legally sack Smith but this was refused due to the personal risk he would have been in.

The Rhodesian government accompanied UDI with emergency measures that it said were intended to prevent alarm, unrest and the flight of people and capital. Press censorship and petrol rationing were imposed, import licences were cancelled and emigration allowances were cut to £100. News of UDI was generally received calmly by the local citizenry, apart from some isolated incidents of passing cars being stoned in the black townships outside Bulawayo. A few expected dissenters were arrested, most prominently Leo Baron, Nkomo's lawyer, whose links with black Rhodesians and communists were seen by the authorities as "subversive". Baron, the younger brother of the scientist Jacob Bronowski, was arrested nine minutes after UDI was made.

What was it that could make a country twice the size of Britain with half the population of London pit itself against the massive weight of world opinion? Rights or wrongs aside, there was something splendid about the gesture.

— -- Rhodesian journalist Phillippa Berlyn on UDI

Welensky, who had opposed UDI, stated that he felt it was nevertheless "the duty of every responsible Rhodesian to support the revolutionary government" as he believed the only alternative was a descent into anarchy. João de Freitas Cruz, the Portuguese consul-general in Salisbury, reacted to the news with wild excitement; visiting the Smith residence later in the day, he declared "Only Rhodesians could do this!" A statement from ZAPU's Jason Moyo, who was in London at the time, denounced UDI as an act of "treason and rebellion" and asserted that "the lives particularly of four million unarmed Africans are in jeopardy". Davis M'Gabe of the Zimbabwe African National Union (ZANU) said that "For all those who cherish freedom and a meaningful life, UDI has set a collision course which cannot be altered. [It has] marked the turning point of the struggle for freedom ... from a constitutional and political one to primarily a military struggle." Most major Christian denominational leaders in the country publicly rejected UDI and the assertion that it defended Christianity, with the exception of the local Dutch Reformed Church, which stated that it was apolitical and thereafter refrained from comment.

A week after UDI, Smith's government announced that Dupont, the Deputy Prime Minister, had resigned from the Cabinet to accept the post of Officer Administering the Government created by the 1965 constitution. Attempting to assert his claimed prerogatives as Her Majesty's Rhodesian Prime Minister, Smith advised the Queen by letter to appoint Dupont as Governor-General to supersede Gibbs. The letter was ignored, with Buckingham Palace characterising Smith's request as "purported advice". Whitehall maintained that Gibbs was the Queen's only legitimate representative in what it still reckoned as the colony of Southern Rhodesia–and hence, the only lawful authority in the area. Dupont nevertheless effectively replaced the Governor. The Smith administration assigned him the Governor's official residence at Government House, but no attempt was made to forcibly remove Gibbs and his entourage; the post-UDI government stated that the Officer Administering the Government would live at Governor's Lodge instead "until Government House, at present temporarily occupied by Sir Humphrey Gibbs in a private capacity, becomes available".

The Speaker of the Rhodesian parliament, A. R. W. Stumbles, reconvened the Legislative Assembly on 25 November, resolving that if he did not there would be chaos. He feared that Gibbs might dramatically walk into the chamber in an attempt to stop the proceedings, but Gibbs did no such thing. The parliamentary opposition opened the meeting by asking whether the assembly was legal. Ahrn Palley, the lone white opposition MP, announced that as he saw it, "certain Honourable Members in collusion have torn up the constitution under which this House meets. The proceedings have no legal validity whatsoever". Stumbles overruled this objection and two more interruptions from Palley, and suggested that any members with reservations might leave. Palley continued his loud protests until he was forcibly ejected by the Sergeant-at-Arms, shouting "This is an illegal assembly! God save the Queen!" Gondo and eight other opposition MPs followed Palley out; all ten of them rejoined the Legislative Assembly in February 1966. (Note: When they then repeatedly referred to Smith's government as "the illegal regime" during parliamentary discussions, Stumbles ruled the term out of order.)

Gibbs received threatening letters from the Rhodesian public, and on 26 November 1965 Smith's government cut off the telephones at Government House, and removed the ceremonial guard, the official cars "and even the typewriters", Wood records. Gibbs nevertheless refused to step down or to leave Government House, issuing a statement that he would remain there "as the lawful Governor of Rhodesia until such time as constitutional government is restored, which I hope will be soon." He stayed at his post, ignored by the post-UDI government, until the declaration of a republic in 1970.

=== British and international responses; sanctions ===
Wilson was astonished by Smith's actions, and found the timing of the declaration to coincide with the Armistice Day silence deeply insulting. Describing Salisbury as "hell-bent on illegal self-destroying", the British prime minister, supported in the Commons by the Liberals and most Conservatives, called on Rhodesians to ignore the post-UDI government. Within hours of UDI, the UN General Assembly passed a condemnatory resolution, 107–2—South Africa and Portugal voted against, and France abstained—decrying Rhodesia's actions and calling on Britain to end "the rebellion by the unlawful authorities in Salisbury". The UN Security Council the next day adopted Resolution 216, which denounced the declaration of independence as illegal and racist, and called on all states to refuse recognition and assistance to the Rhodesian government. Security Council Resolution 217, following on 20 November, condemned UDI as an illegitimate "usurpation of power by a racist settler minority", and called on nations neither to recognise what it deemed "this illegal authority" nor to entertain diplomatic or economic relations with it. Both of these measures were adopted by ten votes to none with France abstaining.

Rhodesian nationalists and their overseas supporters, prominently the OAU, clamoured for Britain to remove Smith's government by force. The UN Committee on Independence also strongly advised military intervention. The British government dismissed this option because of various logistical issues, the risk of provoking a Rhodesian attack on Zambia and the psychological problems that were likely to accompany any confrontation between British and Rhodesian troops in what Smith said would be a "fratricidal war". British Foreign Secretary Michael Stewart stated that the United Kingdom thought that Rhodesian forces were well-equipped, well-trained and highly motivated and that an invasion would lead to "a medium sized war of uncertain duration". Wilson instead resolved to end the Rhodesian rebellion through economic sanctions; these principally comprised the expulsion of Rhodesia from the Sterling area, a ban on the import of Rhodesian sugar, tobacco, chrome and other goods and an oil boycott of Rhodesia. When the Rhodesians continued to receive oil, Wilson attempted to directly cut off their main supply lines, namely the Portuguese Mozambican ports at Beira and Lourenço Marques, by posting a Royal Navy squadron to the Mozambique Channel in March 1966. This blockade, the Beira Patrol, was endorsed the following month by UN Security Council Resolution 221. The United Nations proceeded to institute the first mandatory trade sanctions in its history with Security Council Resolutions 232 (December 1966) and 253 (April 1968), which required member states to cease all trade and economic links with Rhodesia.

Wilson predicted in January 1966 that the various boycotts would force Smith to give in "within a matter of weeks rather than months", but the British and UN sanctions had little effect on Rhodesia, largely because South Africa and Portugal went on trading with the breakaway colony, providing it with oil and other commodities. Clandestine "sanction-busting" trade with other nations also continued, initially at a reduced level and the diminished presence of foreign competitors helped domestic industries to slowly mature and expand. Rhodesia thus avoided the economic collapse predicted by Wilson and gradually became more self-sufficient. The Rhodesian government set up a string of front holding companies in Switzerland, Luxembourg and Liechtenstein to help keep trade open with some success; goods that had been imported from Britain were replaced by Japanese, French and West German equivalents. Even many OAU states, while bombarding Rhodesia with vitriol, continued importing Rhodesian food and other products. The United States created a formal exception in its embargo with the Byrd Amendment of 1971, under which the US replaced its import of chrome from the Soviet Union with Rhodesian chrome ore. This breach of the UN sanctions, passed by the US Congress on the back of anti-communist Cold War considerations, was warmly welcomed by several white Southerners in Congress; it aided the Rhodesian economy until 1977, when the new president, Jimmy Carter, successfully pushed Congress to repeal it.

== Recognition ==
=== Foreign ===
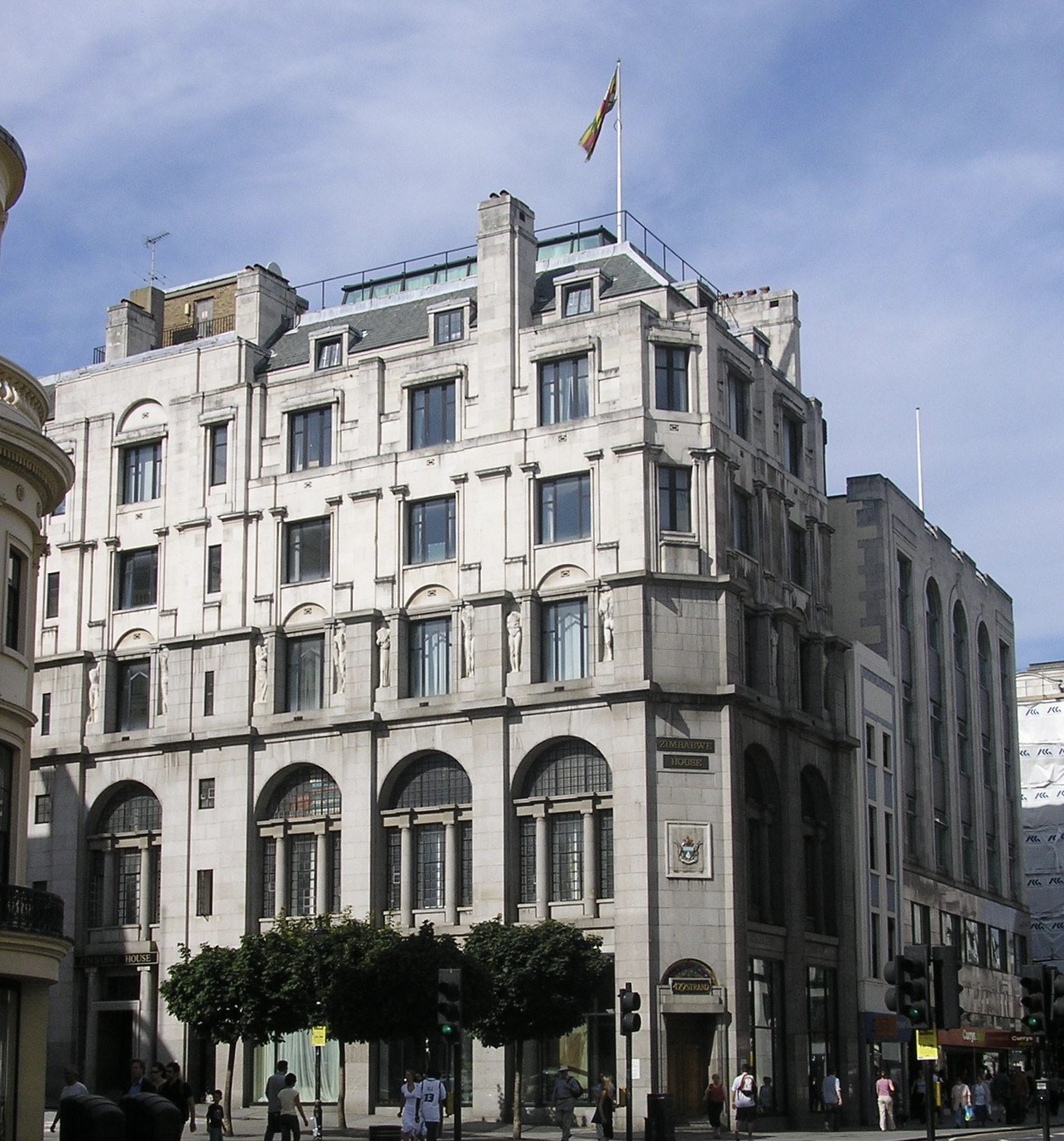
Rhodesia House, the Rhodesian High Commission in London, represented Smith's government in the UK until 1969, and became a regular target for political activists.

Official diplomatic recognition by other countries was key for Rhodesia as it was the only way it could regain the international legitimacy it had lost through UDI. Recognition by the UK itself through a bilateral settlement would be the "first prize", in Smith's words, as it would end sanctions and constitutional ambiguity and make foreign acceptance, at least in the West, far more likely. Considering their country a potentially important player in the Cold War as a "bastion against communism" in southern Africa, the RF posited that some Western countries might recognise UDI even without a prior Anglo-Rhodesian rapprochement. Specifically, it expected diplomatic recognition from South Africa and Portugal, and thought that France might recognise Rhodesia to annoy Britain and create a precedent for an independent Quebec. But although South Africa and Portugal gave economic, military and limited political support to the post-UDI government (as did France and other nations, to a lesser extent), neither they nor any other country ever recognised Rhodesia as a de jure independent state. Rhodesia's unsuccessful attempts to win Western support and recognition included offers to the US government in 1966 and 1967, ignored by Lyndon B. Johnson's administration, to provide Rhodesian troops to fight alongside the Americans and other anti-communist forces in Vietnam.

Britain withdrew most of its High Commission staff from Salisbury in the days following UDI, leaving a small skeleton staff to man a "residual mission" intended to help Gibbs keep the British government informed of local happenings. Several countries followed Britain's lead and closed their consulates in Salisbury, with one prominent exception to this being the United States, which retained its consulate-general in post-UDI Rhodesia, relabelling it a "US Contacts Office" to circumvent the problem of diplomatic recognition. (Note: Australia and Canada shut down their trade missions in Salisbury, while Finland, Sweden and Turkey closed their honorary consulates. Denmark, France, Italy, Japan and the United States withdrew their heads of mission, but kept their offices open. Austria, Belgium, Greece, the Netherlands, Norway, Portugal and Switzerland retained their representative missions in Salisbury at the same levels as before UDI.) South Africa and Portugal maintained "Accredited Diplomatic Representative" offices in Salisbury, which were embassies in all but name, while Rhodesia kept its pre-UDI overseas missions in Pretoria, Lisbon and Lourenço Marques. Unofficial representative offices of the Rhodesian government also existed in the US, Japan and West Germany, while a citizen of Belgium was employed to represent Rhodesian interests there with the Rhodesia Information Centre being in Australia to represent Rhodesia. The Rhodesian High Commission in London, located at Rhodesia House on the Strand, remained under the control of the post-UDI government and effectively became its representative office in the UK. Like the South African Embassy on Trafalgar Square, Rhodesia House became a regular target for political demonstrations. These continued even after Britain forced the office to close in 1969.

Because UDI claimed to make Rhodesia independent under the Queen as an effective dominion, many countries justified their retention of missions in Rhodesia concurrently with their non-recognition of the state by pointing out that the envoys' accreditation was to the Queen and not to Smith's government per se. But Rhodesia moved away from its original line of independence as a constitutional monarchy and towards republicanism during the late 1960s, hoping to end ambiguity regarding its claimed constitutional status and elicit official foreign recognition. In March 1970, after the electorate had voted "yes" in a referendum the previous year both to a new constitution and to the abandoning of symbolic ties to the Queen, Smith's government declared Rhodesia a republic. Far from prompting recognition, this led all countries apart from Portugal and South Africa to withdraw their consulates and missions, as the justification of royal accreditation could no longer be used. After Portugal's Carnation Revolution in 1974, the Rhodesian mission in Lisbon was closed in May 1975, with its counterpart in Lourenço Marques following a month later on Mozambican independence. Portugal also withdrew its own remaining officials from Rhodesia, leaving South Africa as the only country with links to Salisbury. Rhodesia's diplomatic activities were thereafter greatly diminished.

=== Judicial ===
The Rhodesian High Court's nine Appellate and General Division judges initially neither rejected UDI nor openly supported it. The Chief Justice Sir Hugh Beadle, of the Appellate Division, announced simply that the judges would go on carrying out their duties "according to the law". This originally noncommittal stance evolved over time, largely pivoting around legal cases argued at the High Court in Salisbury between 1966 and 1968. The first of these, Madzimbamuto v. Lardner-Burke N. O. and Others, concerned Daniel Madzimbamuto, a black Rhodesian who was detained without trial by the Rhodesian government on 6 November 1965, the day after the declaration of a state of emergency and five days before UDI, on the grounds that he might pose a danger to the public. Desmond Lardner-Burke, the Rhodesian Minister of Justice and Law and Order, prolonged the state of emergency in February 1966, prompting Madzimbamuto's wife to appeal for his release, arguing that since the United Kingdom had declared UDI illegal and outlawed the Rhodesian government with the Southern Rhodesia Act 1965, the state of emergency (and, by extension, Madzimbamuto's imprisonment) had no legal basis.

The General Division of the Rhodesian High Court ruled on 9 September 1966 that legal sovereignty lay with the British government, but that to "avoid chaos and a vacuum in the law" the Rhodesian government should be considered to be in control of law and order to the same extent as before UDI. In February 1968, ruling on Madzimbamuto's appeal, Beadle concluded that the Smith administration would be recognised by the local judiciary as the de facto government by virtue of its "effective control over the state's territory", but that de jure recognition would be withheld as this was not "firmly established". Madzimbamuto applied for the right to appeal to the British Privy Council; the Rhodesian Appellate Division promptly ruled that he had no right to do so, but the Privy Council considered his case anyway.

In late February 1968, considering the fate of James Dhlamini, Victor Mlambo and Duly Shadreck, three black Rhodesians convicted of murder and terrorist offences before UDI, Beadle ruled that Salisbury retained its pre-UDI powers regarding executions and could carry out death sentences. Whitehall announced on 1 March that at the request of the UK government, the Queen had exercised the royal prerogative of mercy and commuted the three death sentences to life imprisonment. Dhlamini and the others applied for a permanent stay of execution on this basis. At the hearing for Dhlamini and Mlambo on 4 March 1968, Beadle argued that he saw the statement from London as a decision by the UK government and not the Queen herself, and that in any case the 1961 constitution had transferred the prerogative of mercy from Britain to the Rhodesian Executive Council. "The present government is the fully de facto government and as such is the only power that can exercise the prerogative", he concluded. "It would be strange indeed if the United Kingdom government, exercising no internal power in Rhodesia, were given the right to exercise the prerogative of clemency." The Judge President Sir Vincent Quénet and Justice Hector Macdonald agreed, and the application was dismissed. Justice John Fieldsend of the High Court's General Division resigned in protest, writing to Gibbs that he no longer believed the High Court to be defending the rights of Rhodesian citizens. Dhlamini, Mlambo and Shadreck were hanged on 6 March.

On 23 July 1968, the Privy Council in London ruled in Madzimbamuto's favour, deciding that orders for detention made by the Rhodesian government were invalid regardless of whether the 1961 or 1965 constitution was considered effective. It declared the latter, "revolutionary" constitution illegal, and ruled that the former was overridden by the Southern Rhodesia Act 1965, which had effectively outlawed the Rhodesian legislative, administrative and legal authorities in British law. Lord Reid, delivering the majority opinion (Lord Pearce dissented), argued that the "usurper" government, though the effective master of Rhodesia, could not be considered lawful as the UK government was still attempting to regain control and it was impossible to say whether or not it would succeed. He ruled that only Whitehall could determine what constituted the maintenance of "law and order" in Rhodesia, and that the Rhodesian emergency measures were unlawful as they had been formalised by the Officer Administering the Government, a post-UDI figure who was, in British eyes, unconstitutional. Reid concluded that Madzimbamuto was illegally detained. Harry Davies, one of the Rhodesian judges, announced on 8 August that the Rhodesian courts would not consider this ruling binding as they no longer accepted the Privy Council as part of the Rhodesian judicial hierarchy. Justice J. R. Dendy Young resigned in protest at Davies' ruling on 12 August and four days later was sworn in as Chief Justice of Botswana.

The Rhodesian High Court granted full de jure recognition to the post-UDI government on 13 September 1968, while rejecting the appeals of 32 black Rhodesians who had been a month earlier convicted of terrorist offences and sentenced to death. Beadle declared that while he believed the Rhodesian judiciary should respect rulings of the Privy Council "so far as possible", the judgement of 23 July had made it legally impossible for Rhodesian judges to continue under the 1961 constitution. He asserted that the court therefore faced a choice between the 1965 constitution and a legal vacuum, the latter of which he felt he could not endorse. Referring to the Privy Council's decision that the UK might yet remove the post-UDI government, he said that "on the facts as they exist today, the only prediction which this court can make is that sanctions will not succeed in overthrowing the present government ... and that there are no other factors which might succeed in doing so".

Macdonald, a member of Beadle's ruling panel, argued that since UDI, the British government had acted unconstitutionally and illegally regarding Rhodesia by involving the United Nations in what should have been legally considered a domestic problem, and had concurrently abdicated its right to the allegiance of the Rhodesian people by waging economic war against the country and encouraging other nations to do the same. To support this argument, Macdonald referred to the assertion by the 17th-century Dutch jurist Hugo Grotius that "the purpose of governing and the purpose of destroying cannot subsist together". Since Britain was in a state of economic war against Rhodesia, the court concluded, it could not at the same time be regarded as governing it. UDI, the associated 1965 constitution and the government were thereafter considered de jure by the Rhodesian legal system.

The British Commonwealth Secretary, George Thomson, promptly accused the Rhodesian judges of breaching "the fundamental laws of the land", while Gibbs announced that since his position as Governor existed under the 1961 constitution, which allowed appeals to the Privy Council, he could only reject the Rhodesian court ruling. The Rhodesian judges continued regardless. Their recognition of the post-UDI order carried over to the 1969 republican constitution, adopted in 1970.

== Replacement of national symbols ==
Rhodesian Sky Blue Ensign, used until 1968 (Note: This overall design dated back to 1923, but a darker blue field was used until 1964, when the shade was lightened to make the Rhodesian flag more recognisable.)

Rhodesian green-and-white triband, adopted in 1968

Vestiges of British ties were removed piecemeal by the government over the decade following UDI, and replaced with symbols and terminology intended to be more uniquely Rhodesian. A silver "Liberty Bell", based on the bell of the same name in Philadelphia, was cast during 1966 and rung by the Prime Minister 12 times each year on Independence Day (the anniversary of UDI), with some in the press erroneously believing the number of chimes signifying the number of years since the declaration of independence. The Union Jack and Rhodesia's Commonwealth-style national flag—a defaced Sky Blue Ensign with the Union Jack in the canton—continued to fly over government buildings, military bases and other official locations until 11 November 1968, the third anniversary of UDI, when they were superseded by a new national flag: a green-white-green vertical triband, charged centrally with the Rhodesian coat of arms. The Union Jack continued to be ceremonially raised at Cecil Square in Salisbury on 12 September each year as part of the Pioneers' Day holiday, which marked the anniversary of the establishment of Salisbury (and, by extension, Rhodesia) in 1890.

Since Elizabeth II was still the Rhodesian head of state in the eyes of Smith's administration until 1970, "God Save the Queen" remained the Rhodesian national anthem, and continued to accompany official occasions such as the opening of the Rhodesian parliament. This was intended to demonstrate Rhodesia's continued loyalty to the Queen, but the use of the unmistakably British song at Rhodesian state occasions soon seemed "fairly ironic", as The Times put it. Salisbury started looking for a replacement anthem around the same time as its introduction of the new flag, and in 1974, after four years without an anthem ("God Save the Queen" was formally dropped in 1970), republican Rhodesia adopted "Rise, O Voices of Rhodesia", an anthem coupling original lyrics with the tune of Beethoven's "Ode to Joy". The country's head of state under the republican constitution was the President of Rhodesia, the first of whom was Dupont.

State press censorship, which had been introduced on UDI, was lifted in early April 1968. Decimalisation occurred on 17 February 1970, two weeks before Rhodesia's reconstitution as a republic, with the new Rhodesian dollar replacing the pound at a rate of two dollars to each pound. Following the republic's formal declaration the next month, the Rhodesian military removed nomenclatural and symbolic references to the Crown—the Royal Rhodesian Air Force and Royal Rhodesia Regiment dropped their "Royal" prefixes after the Queen formally revoked them because of the declaration, new branch and regimental flags were designed, and the St Edward's Crown surmounting many regimental emblems was expunged in favour of the "Lion and Tusk", a motif from the coat of arms of the British South Africa Company that had been used in Rhodesian military symbolism since the 1890s. The air force's new roundel was a green ring with the lion and tusk on a white centre. Later that year, a system of new Rhodesian honours and decorations was created to replace the old British honours. Rhodesia's police force, the British South Africa Police, was not renamed.

== Ending UDI ==
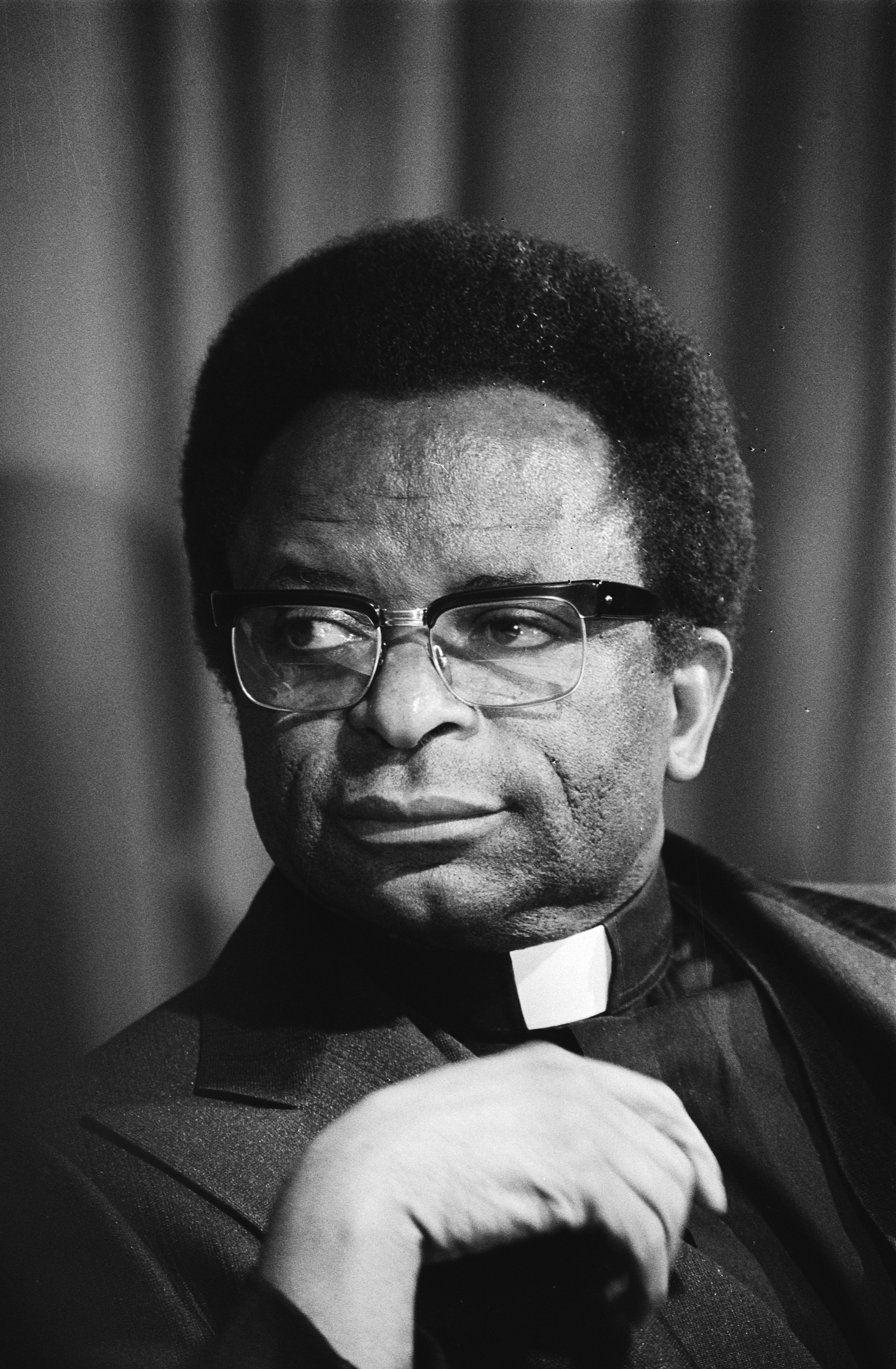
Bishop Abel Muzorewa, the country's first black prime minister, whose unrecognised government revoked UDI in 1979 as part of the Lancaster House Agreement

Wilson told the British House of Commons in January 1966 that he would not enter any kind of dialogue with the post-UDI Rhodesian "illegal regime" until it gave up its claim of independence, but by mid-1966 British and Rhodesian civil servants were holding "talks about talks" in London and Salisbury. By November that year, Wilson had agreed to negotiate personally with Smith. The two Prime Ministers unsuccessfully attempted to settle aboard HMS Tiger in December 1966 and HMS Fearless in October 1968.

After the Conservatives returned to power in Britain in 1970, provisional agreement was reached in November 1971 between the Rhodesian government and a British team headed by Douglas-Home (who was Foreign Secretary under Prime Minister Edward Heath), and in early 1972 a Royal Commission chaired by Lord Pearce travelled to Rhodesia to investigate how acceptable the proposals were to majority opinion. After extensive consultation, the commission reported that while whites, coloureds and Asians were largely in favour of the presented terms, most blacks rejected them. The deal was therefore shelved by the British government.

The Rhodesian Bush War, a guerrilla conflict pitting the Rhodesian Security Forces against the Zimbabwe African National Liberation Army (ZANLA) and the Zimbabwe People's Revolutionary Army (ZIPRA), the respective armed wings of ZANU and ZAPU, began in earnest in December 1972, when ZANLA attacked Altena and Whistlefield Farms in north-eastern Rhodesia. The 1974 Carnation Revolution in Portugal, which over the next year replaced Portuguese support for Smith with an independent, Marxist–Leninist Mozambique on Rhodesia's eastern frontier, greatly swung the war's momentum in favour of the nationalists (particularly ZANU, which was allied with Mozambique's governing FRELIMO party), and caused the sanctions on Rhodesia to finally begin having a noticeable effect. Diplomatic isolation, the sanctions, guerrilla activities and pressure from South Africa to find a settlement led the Rhodesian government to hold talks with the various black Rhodesian factions. Abortive conferences were held at Victoria Falls (in 1975) and Geneva (1976). Despite ideological and tribal rifts, ZANU and ZAPU nominally united as the "Patriotic Front" (PF) in late 1976 in a successful attempt to augment overseas support for the black Rhodesian cause.

By the mid-1970s, it was apparent that white minority rule could not continue forever. Even South Africa's prime minister John Vorster realized that white rule in a country where blacks outnumbered whites 22:1 was not a realistic option. Smith, who was decisively re-elected three times during the 1970s, eventually came to this conclusion as well. He announced his acceptance in principle of one man, one vote during Henry Kissinger's Anglo-American initiative in September 1976, and in March 1978 concluded the Internal Settlement with non-militant nationalist groups headed by Bishop Abel Muzorewa, the Reverend Ndabaningi Sithole and Chief Jeremiah Chirau. This settlement, boycotted by the PF and rejected internationally, led to multiracial elections and Rhodesia's reconstitution under majority rule as Zimbabwe Rhodesia in June 1979. Muzorewa, the electoral victor, took office as the country's first black prime minister at the head of a coalition cabinet comprising 12 blacks and five whites, including Smith as minister without portfolio. Dismissing Muzorewa as a "neocolonial puppet", ZANLA and ZIPRA continued their armed struggle until December 1979, when Whitehall, Salisbury and the Patriotic Front settled at Lancaster House. Muzorewa's government revoked UDI, thereby ending the country's claim to be independent after 14 years, and dissolved itself. The UK suspended the constitution and vested full executive and legislative powers in a new Governor, Lord Soames, who oversaw a ceasefire and fresh elections during February and March 1980. These were won by ZANU, whose leader Robert Mugabe became Prime Minister when the UK granted independence to Zimbabwe as a republic within the Commonwealth in April 1980. African nationalist politicians continued to cite their opposition to the UDI as a means of legitimising their rule of Zimbabwe into the 21st century. Since it was issued, the UDI has been recounted in scholarly literature, autobiographies of those involved in its creation, and works of fiction.
