= 1974 Rhodesian general election =

- 30 July 1974

All 66 seats in the House of Assembly 34 seats needed for a majority
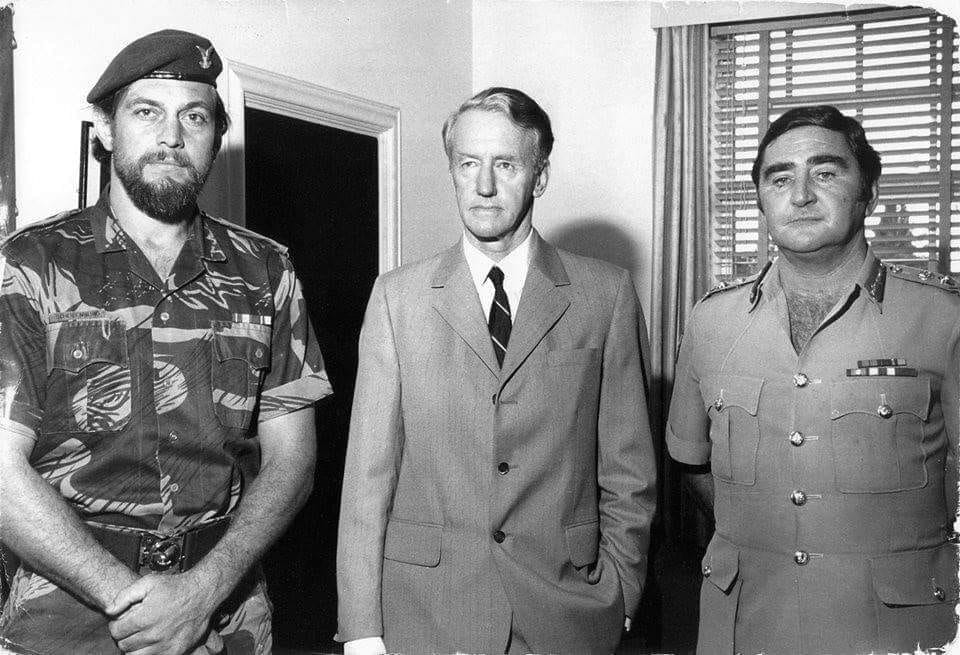

	First party	Second party
Leader	Ian Smith	–
Party	RF	ANC Independents
Leader's seat	Umzingwane
Last election	50	–
Seats won	50	6
Seat change	–	New
Popular vote	55,597	1,590
Percentage	77.98% (European)	53.36% (African)
Swing	▲0.2pp	New
- Composition of the House of Assembly after the election
Prime Minister before election
Ian Smith
RF
Elected Prime Minister
Ian Smith
RF

General elections were held in Rhodesia on 30 July 1974. They saw the Rhodesian Front of Ian Smith re-elected, once more winning every one of the 50 seats elected by white voters.

== Background ==
Since the previous election in 1970, the main African nationalist groups had changed their strategy and gone into exile in Zambia (and to a lesser extent Mozambique and Botswana), launching a war to overthrow white minority rule by force. The main African groups, the Zimbabwe African National Union (ZANU), Zimbabwe African People's Union (ZAPU) and the Front for the Liberation of Zimbabwe (FROLIZI), formed the African National Council under Bishop Abel Muzorewa to act as a collective political leadership and undertake any negotiations with the Rhodesian government.

In June 1974, the African National Council rejected settlement proposals which had come out of discussions between itself and the Rhodesian government. As the Rhodesian Parliament was into its fifth year, a general election became a real prospect. Timothy Gibbs of the Rhodesia Party announced on 9 June 1974 that he expected a September election, and on 19 June, Prime Minister Ian Smith announced that there would be an election imminently (he did not name the date). He also announced round table talks with Africans, including the Council of Chiefs. These talks were rejected by the African National Council as a waste of time.

=== Campaign ===
The Rhodesia Party, a white opposition party, had been formed by ex-Rhodesian Front MP Allan Savory in 1972. They were a moderate group which advocated more moves towards including the African population in internal politics. Early in June 1974, Savory made a speech at Hartley in which he was reported as saying that if he had been a black Rhodesian, he would be a terrorist. The uproar was such that Savory was forced from the leadership (replaced by Gibbs) and resigned from the party on 16 June. Despite the turmoil, the Rhodesia Party managed to nominate candidates in 40 out of the 50 seats.

There were also several Independent candidates including six right-wingers sponsored by the Rhodesian Group. The multi-racial Centre Party, which had provided the main opposition at the previous election, nominated a single candidate (who was from an Indian background). When nominations closed on 7 July, two seats (including that of Ian Smith) were elected unopposed. A victory by the Rhodesian Front was almost inevitable, although six seats were regarded as marginal.

The most marginal seat was clearly Salisbury City, where a right-wing Rhodesian Front candidate Ted Sutton-Pryce faced Dr Ahrn Palley, an Independent ex-member of the House of Assembly who had been a lone white opponent of UDI. In the 1970 election, the Rhodesian Front had defeated a mixed-race Independent candidate by only 40 votes, with a Centre Party candidate taking 157. Allan Savory, despite his departure from the Rhodesia Party, fought in Highlands North in the Salisbury suburbs as an Independent.

The Rhodesian Front responded to the challenge from the Rhodesia Party by attacking it for holding secret negotiations with the African National Council behind the backs of the Rhodesia government with the intent of undermining them. Ian Smith identified the Rhodesia Party with the 'liberal establishment' of Rhodesia, which had been responsible for the 1962 constitution and the inadequate arrangements of the Federation of Rhodesia and Nyasaland in 1953.

== Electoral system ==
The electorate of Rhodesia returned 66 members of the House of Assembly of Rhodesia, in three different classes of seat:

- European roll seats: 50 members were returned from single-member constituencies by voters who were either of European, Asian or mixed (Coloured) descent.
- African roll seats: 8 members were returned from single-member constituencies by voters of African descent.
- Tribal seats: 8 seats were returned by Tribal electoral colleges made up of the Chiefs of the Tribes.

Both European and African rolls had a range of property qualifications. No change to boundaries or the qualification of voters was made compared to the 1970 election.

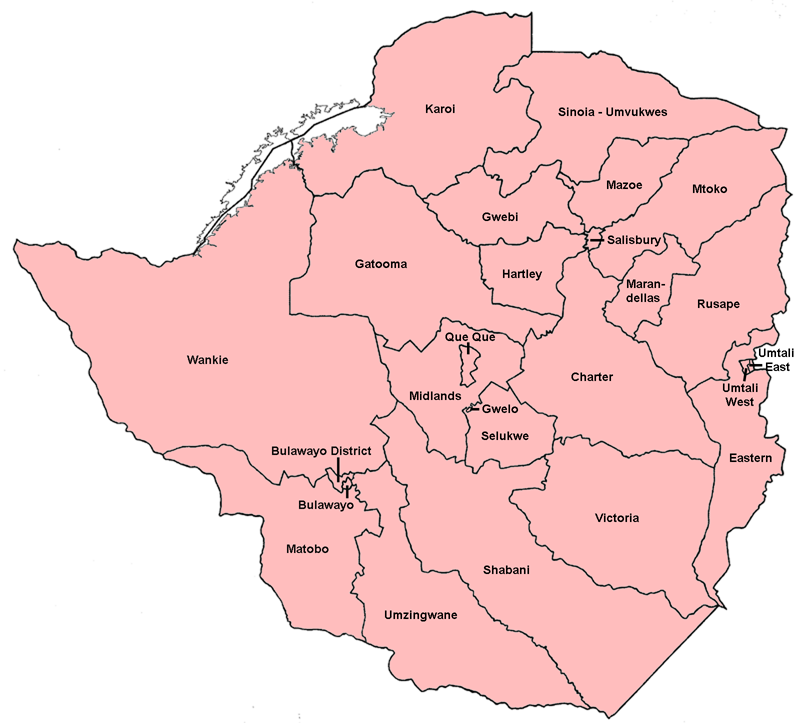
Rural constituencies.

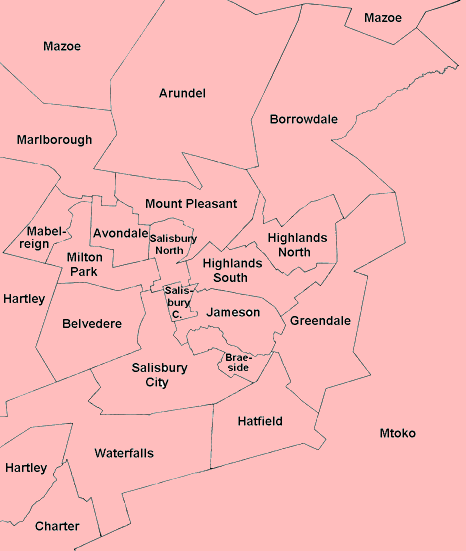
Constituencies in Salisbury.

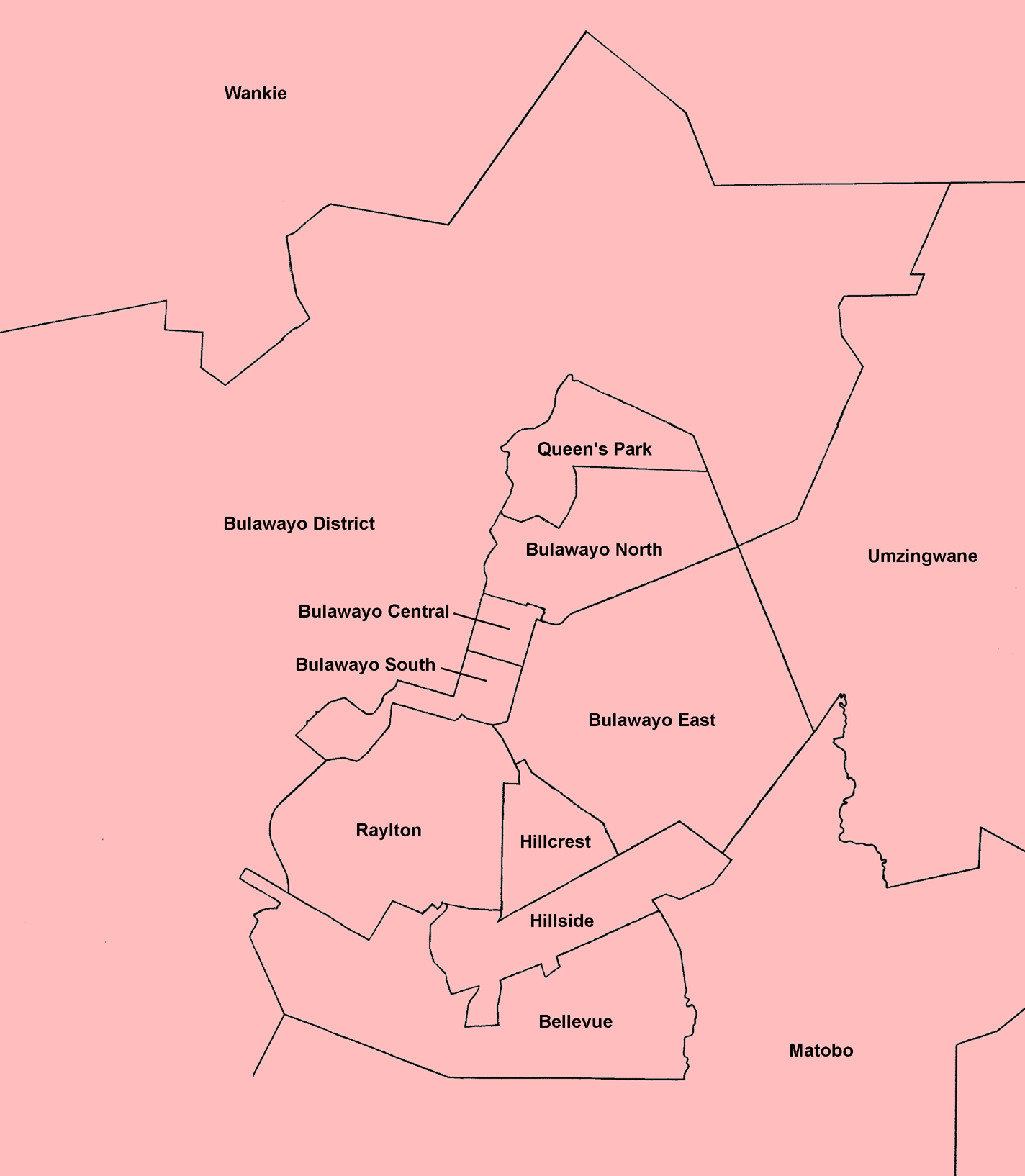
Constituencies in Bulawayo.

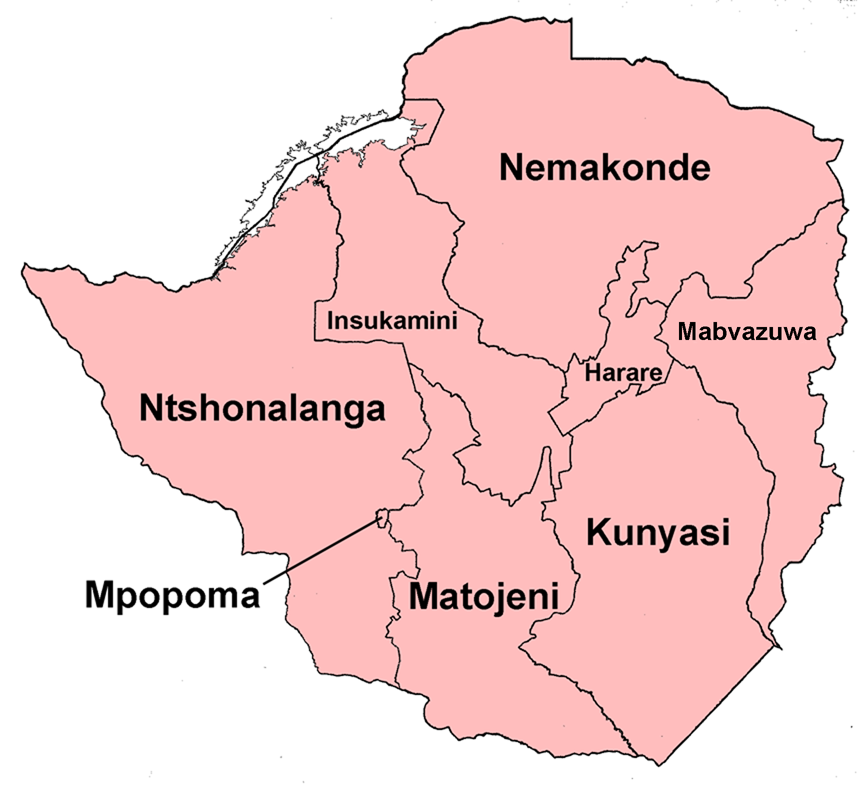
African roll constituencies.

== Results ==
Party	European roll			African roll			Total seats	+/–
Party	Votes	%	Seats	Votes	%	Seats	Total seats	+/–
Rhodesian Front	55,597	76.98	50				50	0
Rhodesia Party	13,776	19.08	0				0	New
African National Council independents				1,590	53.36	6	6	New
Rhodesian Group Independents	736	1.02	0				0	New
Centre Party	25	0.03	0	477	16.01	1	1	–6
African Progressive Party				54	1.81	0	0	New
NSF				6	0.20	0	0	New
Independents	2,085	2.89	0	853	28.62	1	1	+1
Tribal representatives							8	0
Total	72,219	100.00	50	2,980	100.00	8	66	0
Registered voters/turnout	80,437	–		5,500	–			

=== European roll seats ===
Constituency Electorate and turnout	Candidate	Party	Votes	%
ARUNDEL; 2,393 (93.1%)	Archibald Wilson	RF	1,505	67.5
ARUNDEL; 2,393 (93.1%)	Nicholas John McNally	RP	723	32.5
AVONDALE; 1,983 (90.9%)	† Colin Eric Barlow	RF	1,397	77.5
AVONDALE; 1,983 (90.9%)	Myfanwy Eleanor Bridget Nolan van Hoffen	RP	405	22.5
BELLEVUE; 2,272 (92.7%)	† Wallace Evelyn Stuttaford	RF	1,735	82.3
BELLEVUE; 2,272 (92.7%)	Robert Duncan Bothwell Fleming	RP	372	17.7
BELVEDERE; 1,862 (91.6%)	† Dennis Divaris	RF	1,155	67.7
BELVEDERE; 1,862 (91.6%)	Ralph Albert Newmarch	RP	456	26.7
BELVEDERE; 1,862 (91.6%)	John Fraser Caladine Whiting	Ind RG	69	4.0
BELVEDERE; 1,862 (91.6%)	Ratilal Damodar Devchand	CP	25	1.5
BORROWDALE; 2,672 (91.2%)	† Douglas Hamilton Ritchie	RF	1,596	65.5
BORROWDALE; 2,672 (91.2%)	Peter Anthony Bridger	RP	835	34.3
BORROWDALE; 2,672 (91.2%)	Wendy Ann Truen	Ind	6	0.2
BRAESIDE; 1,570 (89.0%)	Richard Cartwright	RF	1,269	90.8
BRAESIDE; 1,570 (89.0%)	David Murray	Ind RG	128	9.2
BULAWAYO CENTRAL; 1,252 (90.7%)	Edward Stanley White	RF	722	63.6
BULAWAYO CENTRAL; 1,252 (90.7%)	Timothy Durant Gibbs	RP	414	36.4
BULAWAYO DISTRICT; 1,613 (88.9%)	† Alexander Moseley	RF	1,112	77.5
BULAWAYO DISTRICT; 1,613 (88.9%)	Michael Theodore Hayes Auret	RP	322	22.5
BULAWAYO EAST; 2,080 (91.4%)	† Elias Broomberg	RF	1,274	67.0
BULAWAYO EAST; 2,080 (91.4%)	Jurick Goldwasser	RP	628	33.0
BULAWAYO NORTH; 1,725 (83.1%)	Denis Walker	RF	1,339	93.4
BULAWAYO NORTH; 1,725 (83.1%)	Austen Sales Perkins	Ind	94	6.6
BULAWAYO SOUTH; 1,071 (87.1%)	Ian Peter Rees-Davies	RF	697	74.7
BULAWAYO SOUTH; 1,071 (87.1%)	Ronald Edward Clark	RP	236	25.3
CHARTER; 1,417 (87.6%)	† Rowan Cronjé	RF	1,147	92.4
CHARTER; 1,417 (87.6%)	Neil Diarmid Campbell Housman Herbert Wilson	Ind RG	94	7.6
EASTERN; 1,312 (91.7%)	John Hamilton Wright	RF	952	79.1
EASTERN; 1,312 (91.7%)	Obe Veldman	RP	251	20.9
GATOOMA; 1,410 (92.3%)	† Albert Gannaway Mells	RF	1,098	84.3
GATOOMA; 1,410 (92.3%)	Raymond Thomas Mossop	RP	203	15.7
GREENDALE; 2,050 (92.6%)	† Mark Partridge	RF	1,332	70.2
GREENDALE; 2,050 (92.6%)	Norman James Hendry	RP	373	19.7
GREENDALE; 2,050 (92.6%)	Ernest Roy Wright	Ind RG	193	10.2
GWEBI; 1,328 (89.7%)	† Thomas Ian Fraser Sandeman	RF	939	78.8
GWEBI; 1,328 (89.7%)	James Strathearn Brown	RP	252	21.2
GWELO; 1,257 (91.6%)	† Roger Hawkins	RF	971	84.4
GWELO; 1,257 (91.6%)	Gordon Hamilton Peters	RP	180	15.6
HARTLEY; 2,135 (91.9%)	† P. K. van der Byl	RF	1,668	85.0
HARTLEY; 2,135 (91.9%)	James McClure Sinclair	RP	295	15.0
HATFIELD; 1,768 (90.8%)	Frederick Roy Simmonds	RF	1,231	76.7
HATFIELD; 1,768 (90.8%)	William John Harper	RP	288	17.9
HATFIELD; 1,768 (90.8%)	Jack Peche	Ind	80	5.0
HATFIELD; 1,768 (90.8%)	Christoph William Utley	Ind	6	0.4
HIGHLANDS NORTH; 1,779 (92.4%)	Fergus Craig Blackie	RF	931	56.7
HIGHLANDS NORTH; 1,779 (92.4%)	† Clifford Allan Redin Savory	Ind	394	24.0
HIGHLANDS NORTH; 1,779 (92.4%)	Philip Robert James Grinham	RP	230	14.0
HIGHLANDS NORTH; 1,779 (92.4%)	Diana Mitchell	Ind	88	5.3
HIGHLANDS SOUTH; 1,886 (91.4%)	† Richard Hope Hall	RF	1,299	75.3
HIGHLANDS SOUTH; 1,886 (91.4%)	Marcus Patrick Doyle	RP	425	24.7
HILLCREST; 1,727 (93.1%)	† John Arthur Newington	RF	1,390	86.4
HILLCREST; 1,727 (93.1%)	Peter Henry Corbishley	RP	218	13.6
HILLSIDE; 1,834 (93.3%)	† Dennis Fawcett Phillips	RF	1,143	66.8
HILLSIDE; 1,834 (93.3%)	Ewen Cardno Greenfield	RP	569	33.2
JAMESON; 1,700 (85.2%)	† John Peter Broberg Nilson	RF	1,264	87.2
JAMESON; 1,700 (85.2%)	Raymond Stallwood	Ind	185	12.8
KAROI; 1,241 (85.0%)	Jan Jacobus Buitendag	RF	842	79.8
KAROI; 1,241 (85.0%)	Peter William Richards	RP	213	20.2
MABELREIGN; 1,823 (89.6%)	John Cornelius Gleig	RF	1,171	71.7
MABELREIGN; 1,823 (89.6%)	Ian George Anderson	RP	462	28.3
MARANDELLAS; 1,446 (91.4%)	† David Colville Smith	RF	1,046	79.1
MARANDELLAS; 1,446 (91.4%)	Alfred John Harrison	RP	276	20.9
MARLBOROUGH; 2,608 (72.3%)	† William Michie Irvine	RF	1,479	78.5
MARLBOROUGH; 2,608 (72.3%)	Nigel Graham-Smith	RP	406	21.5
MATOBO; 1,673 (88.0%)	Robert Henry Warren McGee	RF	1,218	82.7
MATOBO; 1,673 (88.0%)	Marshall P. Baron	Ind	255	17.3
MAZOE; 1,589 (92.5%)	† George Rollo Hayman	RF	1,241	84.4
MAZOE; 1,589 (92.5%)	Henry John Wells	RP	229	15.6
MIDLANDS; 1,258 (92.4%)	Henry Swan Elsworth	RF	1,009	86.8
MIDLANDS; 1,258 (92.4%)	William Septimus Beckett	RP	154	13.2
MILTON PARK; 1,664 (91.2%)	John Alfred Landau	RF	1,135	74.8
MILTON PARK; 1,664 (91.2%)	Niels Erik Oldenburg	RP	382	25.2
MOUNT PLEASANT; 1,882 (90.5%)	Jonas Christian Andersen	RF	1,045	61.3
MOUNT PLEASANT; 1,882 (90.5%)	Muriel Ena Rosin	RP	658	38.7
MTOKO; 1,718 (91.7%)	† Rodney Guy Swayne Simmonds	RF	1,070	67.9
MTOKO; 1,718 (91.7%)	Guy Kerry Webb	RP	506	32.1
QUEENS PARK; 1,530	Arthur Denis Crook	RF	unopposed	
QUE QUE; 1,632 (91.9%)	† Jacobus Johannes Burger	RF	1,201	80.1
QUE QUE; 1,632 (91.9%)	Louis Henry Bennett	RP	299	19.9
RAYLTON; 1,844 (90.3%)	† Patrick Francis Shields	RF	1,223	73.5
RAYLTON; 1,844 (90.3%)	James Kinley	RP	442	26.5
RUSAPE; 1,295 (95.2%)	† Johannes Jacobus Lodewickus de Kock	RF	1,040	84.3
RUSAPE; 1,295 (95.2%)	Raymond Boxwell Holcroft	RP	193	15.7
SALISBURY CENTRAL; 1,250 (88.2%)	Hilary Squires	RF	855	77.5
SALISBURY CENTRAL; 1,250 (88.2%)	Lance Halford Reynolds	RP	216	19.6
SALISBURY CENTRAL; 1,250 (88.2%)	Patrick Gerard Keane	Ind	32	2.9
SALISBURY CITY; 1,309 (89.3%)	† Edward Aylett Sutton-Pryce	RF	586	50.1
SALISBURY CITY; 1,309 (89.3%)	Ahrn Palley	Ind	583	49.9
SALISBURY NORTH; 1,588 (91.1%)	† André Sothern Holland	RF	1,103	76.2
SALISBURY NORTH; 1,588 (91.1%)	John Philip Gold Duncan	RP	344	23.8
SELUKWE; 1,682 (90.7%)	John Morris Lowenthal	RF	1,249	81.9
SELUKWE; 1,682 (90.7%)	Trevor Foster Booth	RP	187	12.3
SELUKWE; 1,682 (90.7%)	James William Redmond	Ind RG	89	5.8
SHABANI; 1,266 (83.8%)	† Ian Birt Harper Dillon	RF	944	89.0
SHABANI; 1,266 (83.8%)	Geoffrey Jackson	RP	117	11.0
SINOIA/UMWUKWES; 1,531 (88.1%)	† Esmond Meryl Micklem	RF	1,057	78.4
SINOIA/UMWUKWES; 1,531 (88.1%)	Robert Arnold Anderson	RP	292	21.6
UMTALI EAST; 1,571 (91.2%)	† Bernard Horace Mussett	RF	1,203	83.9
UMTALI EAST; 1,571 (91.2%)	John Grant	RP	230	16.1
UMTALI WEST; 1,437 (90.1%)	† John Christie	RF	933	72.0
UMTALI WEST; 1,437 (90.1%)	Dr Johannes Martheus Wessels	RP	362	28.0
UMZINGWANE; 1,698	† Ian Smith	RF	unopposed	
VICTORIA; 2,071 (89.5%)	† Gordon Richard Olds	RF	1,530	82.6
VICTORIA; 2,071 (89.5%)	Peter Southerton Hingeston	RP	323	17.4
WANKIE; 1,432 (86.6%)	† Reginald Edward Dennis Cowper	RF	1,068	86.1
WANKIE; 1,432 (86.6%)	Mike Huckle	RP	172	13.9
WATERFALLS; 1,531 (87.9%)	† Arthur Philip Smith	RF	1,183	87.9
WATERFALLS; 1,531 (87.9%)	Norman Henry	Ind RG	163	12.1

=== African seats ===
Constituency Electorate and turnout	Candidate	Party	Votes	%
HARARE; 1,118 (63.7%)	Godfrey Guwa Chidyausiku	Ind ANC	424	59.6
HARARE; 1,118 (63.7%)	Isaac Hanzi Samuriwo	Ind	145	20.4
HARARE; 1,118 (63.7%)	† Edward Gabriel Watungwa	CP	71	10.0
HARARE; 1,118 (63.7%)	Lovemore Christopher Mbanga	Ind	32	4.5
HARARE; 1,118 (63.7%)	Ian George Garikayi Charambarara	Ind	24	3.4
HARARE; 1,118 (63.7%)	Hativakwane Lewis Mundawarara	Ind	10	1.4
HARARE; 1,118 (63.7%)	Mark Taurai Muchabaiwa	NSF	6	0.8
INSUKAMINI; 481 (64.7%)	John Zachary Maposa	Ind ANC	188	60.5
INSUKAMINI; 481 (64.7%)	Phillip Elijah Chigogo	Ind	71	22.8
INSUKAMINI; 481 (64.7%)	Judah John Ntini	Ind	30	9.6
INSUKAMINI; 481 (64.7%)	† Lewis Alban Ndhlovu	CP	15	4.8
INSUKAMINI; 481 (64.7%)	Joseph Bunu Ngulube	APP	7	2.3
KUNYASI; 1,543	Thomas Tavagwisa Zawairi	Ind ANC	unopposed	
MABVAZUKA; 946 (57.8%)	Elijah Smile Gende Magavan Nyandoro	Ind ANC	253	46.3
MABVAZUKA; 946 (57.8%)	Davidson Murambiwa Jahwi	Ind	123	22.5
MABVAZUKA; 946 (57.8%)	Moses Mvenge	Ind	63	11.5
MABVAZUKA; 946 (57.8%)	† Lazarus Masenda	CP	52	9.5
MABVAZUKA; 946 (57.8%)	Ambrose Charles Majongwe	APP	31	5.7
MABVAZUKA; 946 (57.8%)	Solomon Gomba Zisengwe	Ind	25	4.6
MATOJENI; 905 (51.2%)	† Lot Enock Dewa	Ind ANC	452	97.6
MATOJENI; 905 (51.2%)	Samson Chibi	APP	11	2.4
MPOPOMA; 394 (52.5%)	† Lwazi Joel Mahlangu	Ind	149	72.0
MPOPOMA; 394 (52.5%)	Theophilus Mali Zondo	Ind	58	28.0
NEMAKONDE; 867 (37.9%)	† Ronald T.D. Sadomba	Ind ANC	273	83.0
NEMAKONDE; 867 (37.9%)	Stephen Amos Dzuka Chirenda	Ind	51	15.5
NEMAKONDE; 867 (37.9%)	Mulena Mwana Sherena Mundawarara	APP	5	1.5
NTSHONALANGA; 789 (52.1%)	† Micah Mahamba Bhebe	CP	339	82.5
NTSHONALANGA; 789 (52.1%)	Ephraim Jiho Mhlanga	Ind	72	17.5

=== Tribal seats ===
- HIGHVELD: Bartholomew Augustine Mabika
- KARIBA: Peter Mhletshwa Nkomo
- LOWVELD: Alford Dzingirai Chademana
- MANICA: †Naboth Absolom Gandazara
- PAGATI: Fani Mlingo
- PIONEER: †Josia Bvajurayi Hove
- TULU: Zephaniah Bafana Dube
- ZAMBEZI: †Takawira Aaron Mungate

== Aftermath ==
The results was reported by The New York Times that the Rhodesian Front had won a landslide victory, with incumbent Prime Minister Ian Smith, in the morning following the election following the declaration of the 34th seat, stating that he was “very pleased with the results" and showed that "Rhodesians are united behind their Government” in regards to its racial policy. Conversely, the election was seen as a major defeat to the Rhodesia Party and the Centre Party, the former who was seen as presenting the largest challenge to the Rhodesian Front since it took office in 1962.

Abel Muzorewa, leader of the United African National Council, the main parliamentary black opposition to the ruling Rhodesian Front, criticised the white electorate for supporting Ian Smith's party, stating that "the white electorate in Rhodesia is possessed by a demon of fear."

=== International reactions ===
United Kingdom: The Parliament of the United Kingdom reaffirmed its policy of international sanctions on Rhodesia and, following a debate on 8 November 1974, the House of Commons voted to approve the Southern Rhodesia Act 1965 (Continuation) Order 1974 which renewed the Southern Rhodesia Act 1965 which stated that the United Kingdom did not recognise Rhodesia's Unilateral Declaration of Independence.

== Changes during the Assembly ==
=== Pioneer ===
Josia Hove died on 14 June 1976. At the byelection on 5 August 1976, Adam Hove was elected to replace him; Benjamin Panga Mbuisa and Twyman Mafohla Sibanda were unsuccessful candidates.

=== Party changes ===
The Land Tenure Amendment Bill of 1977 was highly controversial among Rhodesian Front MPs who objected to the opening of some areas previously designated for Europeans to African ownership. In a vote on 4 March 1977, twelve Rhodesian Front MPs voted against the Bill on a three line whip. They were Reginald Cowper, Dennis Fawcett Phillips, Richard Hope Hall, Robert McGee, John Newington, Peter Nilson, Gordon Olds, Ian Sandeman, Rodney Simmonds and Ted Sutton-Pryce. The Rhodesian press quickly nicknamed them The Dirty Dozen. In July 1977 these MPs formed the right-wing Rhodesian Action Party; this action precipitated the 1977 election as it deprived the government of the needed two-thirds majority to amend the constitution.
