= Archibald Wilson =

Rhodesian fighter pilot

Air Marshal Archibald Wilson ICD OBE

Minister of Posts; Minister of Roads and Road Traffic; Minister of Transport and Power
- In office 10 March 1977 – 1978
- Prime Minister: Ian Smith
- Preceded by: Roger Hawkins
- Succeeded by: William Irvine

Member of the House of Assembly of Rhodesia for Arundel
- In office 30 July 1974 – 10 April 1979
- Preceded by: Andrew Skeen
- Succeeded by: Abolished

Member of the House of Assembly of Zimbabwe Rhodesia (White non-constituency member)
- In office 10 April 1979 – 11 December 1979

Senator of the Senate of Zimbabwe
- In office 11 February 1981 – July 1982
- Preceded by: Douglas Hamilton Ritchie
- Succeeded by: Esme Scott

Personal details
- Born: 28 May 1921 Bulawayo, Rhodesia
- Died: 4 July 2014 (aged 93) Pinjarra Hills, Queensland, Australia
- Party: Rhodesian Front
- Spouse: Lorna Alexandra Wilson (died 2008)

Military service
- Allegiance: United Kingdom; Southern Rhodesia; Rhodesia
- Branch/service: Royal Air Force; Rhodesian Air Force
- Years of service: 1939–1973
- Rank: Air Marshal
- Commands: RRAF Thornhill (1957–1959)
- Battles/wars: World War II; Rhodesian Bush War
- Awards: Independence Commemorative Decoration ICD Order of the British Empire OBE 1939–45 Star Italy Star Defence Medal (United Kingdom) War Medal 1939–1945 General Service Medal Distinguished Flying Cross DFC

Air Marshal Archibald Oliver Garfield Wilson ICD OBE (28 May 1921 – 4 July 2014) was a Rhodesian fighter pilot who served in the Royal Air Force during World War II. He went on to become a senior commander and then Air Marshal in the Rhodesian Air Force in the 1960s and early 1970s. After retirement, he served two terms in the Rhodesian House of Assembly, in the Zimbabwe-Rhodesian Parliament in 1979, and then in the Zimbabwe Parliament in 1981–1982. He held several cabinet portfolios prior to the Internal Settlement. He resigned in 1982 to emigrate, with his wife Lorna, to Australia's Gold Coast in 1982. He became a citizen of Australia in 1988.

== Air force career ==
Wilson joined the Southern Rhodesian Air Force in 1939. He served in World War II as a pilot and then as Officer Commanding No. 238 Squadron from 1943. After the War he held command positions in Southern Rhodesian Air Force (later the Royal Rhodesian Air Force and the Rhodesian Air Force). From 10 June 1957 to 22 June 1959, he was commanding officer of RRAF Thornhill. Wilson was involved in directing the Rhodesian counter-insurgency operations in Nyasaland, Zambia and Rhodesia.

On 8 February 1969 Wilson was appointed Chief of the Air Staff of the Royal Rhodesian Air Force, receiving promotion to the rank of Air vice-marshal. With Rhodesia becoming a republic from 2 March 1970, Wilson oversaw various changes to the force and his role, including new ranks, ensign, roundel, and the renaming of the force from 8 August 1970 as the "Rhodesian Air Force" (RhAF). At the same time his office of Chief of the Air Staff was changed to Commander of the Air Force, and Wilson was promoted to the rank of air marshal. In 1970–71 Wilson was involved in the development of the secret Alcora Exercise military alliance between Rhodesia, South Africa and Portugal. On the occasion of the 25th anniversary of the 1947 formation of the Southern Rhodesia Air Force in November 1972, Wilson announced: "Our Air Force will continue to fulfil its role with quiet efficiency and is ready and able to do its duty – come what may."

After 32 years, Wilson retired from Air Force service on 15 April 1973, being the last remaining member of the original Southern Rhodesia Air Force and the last Chief of the Air Staff. On his retirement he expressed a hopeful tone: "Terrorism in Rhodesia will probably get worse before it gets better but the security forces will win. Terrorism cannot win. It cannot achieve its aim."

== Politics ==
As a member of Ian Smith's Rhodesian Front, Wilson was elected to the House of Assembly as the member for Arundel at the Rhodesian general election in 1974. He retained his seat during the 1977 general election.

He was appointed to the Senate of Zimbabwe in 1981 but resigned after one year.

== Later life ==
After resigning from the Senate in July 1982, Wilson decided to emigrate with his wife Lorna to Australia in August 1982. Wilson and his family settled in the Gold Coast region of Queensland, receiving Australian citizenship on 25 October 1988. With his wife Lorna predeceasing him (27 July 1923 – 22 August 2008) when she died in Brisbane at age 85, Wilson spent his last few years in the RSL Care retirement community in Pinjarra Hills until his death at the age of 93 on 4 July 2014. He is buried with his wife in Tamborine Mountain Cemetery.

== Honours ==
Award (Ribbon / Description)	Notes
Independence Commemorative Decoration (ICD)	11 November 1970
Order of the British Empire (OBE)	(OBE; Military Division) NY 1961
1939–45 Star	
Italy Star	
Defence Medal (United Kingdom)	
War Medal 1939–1945	
General Service Medal	
Distinguished Flying Cross (DFC)	

Military offices
Preceded by Squadron Leader Doug Whyte	Officer Commanding, RRAF Thornhill; 1957–1959	Succeeded by Group Captain John Howard Deall
Preceded by Air Vice-Marshal Harold Hawkins	Chief of the Air Staff; 1969–1970	Office renamed
New title	Commander of the Rhodesian Air Force; 1970–1973	Succeeded by Air Marshal Mick McLaren
House of Assembly of Rhodesia
Preceded by Andrew Skeen	Member of Parliament for Arundel; 1974–1979	Constituency abolished
Political offices
Preceded by Roger Hawkins	Minister of Posts; 1977–1978	Succeeded by William Irvine
Preceded by Roger Hawkins	Minister of Roads and Road Traffic; 1977–1978	Succeeded by William Irvine
Preceded by Roger Hawkins	Minister of Transport and Power; 1977–1978	Succeeded by William Irvine
Parliament of Zimbabwe
Preceded by Douglas Hamilton Ritchie	Senator of the Senate of Zimbabwe; 1981–1982	Succeeded by Esme Scott
