= Henry Everard =

Acting President of Rhodesia

Lieutenant-Colonel Henry Everard GLM ICD DSO TD
- Henry Breedon Everard

President of Rhodesia
- Acting; 5 March 1979 – 1 June 1979
- Prime Minister: Ian Smith
- Preceded by: Jack William Pithey (Acting)
- Succeeded by: Josiah Zion Gumede as President of Zimbabwe Rhodesia
- Acting; 31 August 1978 – 1 November 1978
- Prime Minister: Ian Smith
- Preceded by: John Wrathall
- Succeeded by: Jack William Pithey (Acting)
- Acting; 31 December 1975 – 14 January 1976
- Prime Minister: Ian Smith
- Preceded by: Clifford Dupont
- Succeeded by: John Wrathall

Personal details
- Born: 21 February 1897 Barnet, United Kingdom
- Died: 7 August 1980 (aged 83) Salisbury, Zimbabwe
- Party: Rhodesian Front
- Education: Trinity College, Cambridge
- Civilian awards: Legion of Merit GLM Independence Commemorative Decoration ICD
- Military awards: Distinguished Service Order DSO Territorial Decoration TD

Lieutenant-Colonel Henry Breedon Everard GLM ICD DSO TD (21 February 1897 – 7 August 1980) was a railway engineer and executive who briefly became the Acting President of Rhodesia on three occasions between 1975 and 1979.

Everard was born in Barnet and educated at Marlborough College and graduated from Trinity College, Cambridge in 1922. During the First World War he served in France with the Rifle Brigade, where he was wounded in combat and reached the rank of captain. He worked as a railway engineer from 1922, but was commissioned again on the outbreak of the Second World War, this time in the Sherwood Foresters; he was taken prisoner by German forces, awarded the Distinguished Service Order, and reached the rank of lieutenant-colonel. When repatriated after the war he became an executive of British Railways.

In 1953 Everard moved to Bulawayo, Southern Rhodesia to become General Manager of Rhodesia Railways, which he remained for five years before retiring. He supported the Rhodesian Front and stood in for Clifford Dupont (who had been made "Officer Administering the Government") in 1968–69. Following the proclamation of a republic, Everard was Acting President on three occasions between 1975 and 1979.

His maternal first cousin was the eminent scientist and professor Naomi Datta; their maternal grandfather's first cousins were architect Henry Goddard and Mormon pioneer George Goddard.

== Awards ==
- Legion of Merit (Grand Officer - Civilian) (GLM) (Rhodesia)
- Independence Commemorative Decoration (ICD) (Rhodesia)
- Distinguished Service Order (DSO) (Great Britain)
- Territorial Decoration (South Africa) (TD) (Great Britain)

Political offices
Preceded by Clifford Dupont; John Wrathall; Jack Pithey	President of Rhodesia; 1975–1976; 1978; 1979	Succeeded by John Wrathall; Jack Pithey; Josiah Zion Gumede (of Zimbabwe Rhodesia)
