= 1977 Rhodesian general election =

- 31 August 1977

All 66 seats in the House of Assembly 34 seats needed for a majority
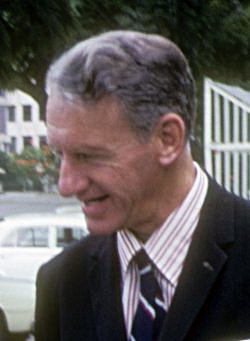
	First party
Leader	Ian Smith
Party	RF
Leader's seat	Umzingwane
Last election	50
Seats won	50
Seat change	Steady
Popular vote	57,348
Percentage	85.36% (European)
Swing	▲7.38pp
- Composition of the House of Assembly after the election
Prime Minister before election
Ian Smith
RF
Elected Prime Minister
Ian Smith
RF

General elections were held in Rhodesia on 31 August 1977, the last general election in the country dominated by the white minority. Prime Minister Ian Smith, who was conducting negotiations with moderate African nationalists, was forced into an early election by the defection of twelve MPs from his Rhodesian Front party, which denied him the two-thirds majority of the House of Assembly needed to change the constitution. In the event, the Front overwhelmed the breakaway Rhodesian Action Party and all other forces, once again winning every single seat in the 50 seats elected by those of European descent.

== Electoral system ==
The electorate of Rhodesia returned 66 members of the House of Assembly of Rhodesia, in three different classes of seat:

- European roll seats: 50 members were returned from single-member constituencies by voters who were either of European, Asian or mixed (Coloured) descent.
- African roll seats: 8 members were returned from single-member constituencies by voters of African descent.
- Tribal seats: 8 seats were returned by Tribal electoral colleges made up of the Chiefs of the Tribes.

Both European and African rolls had a range of property qualifications. No change to boundaries or the qualification of voters was made compared to the 1974 election.

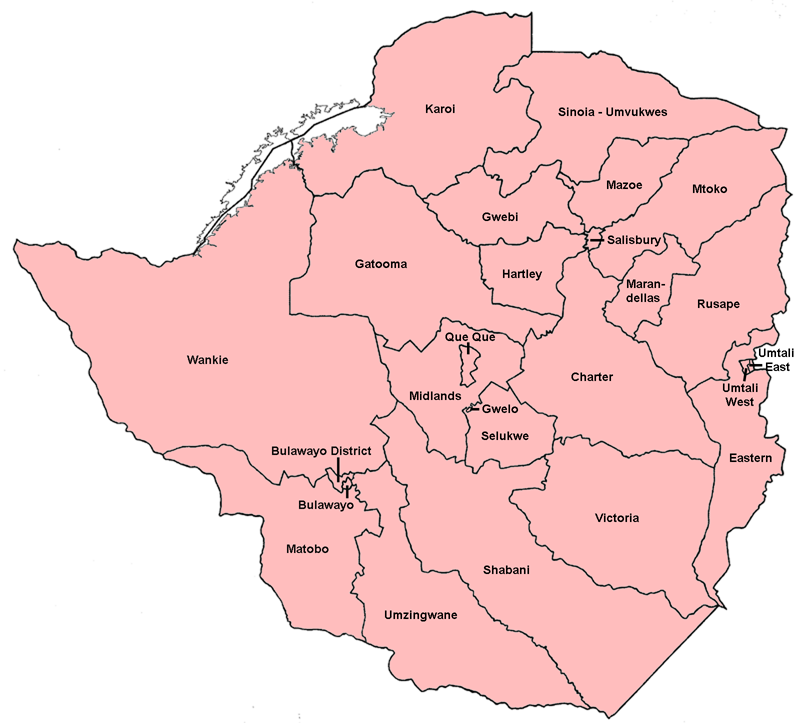
Rural constituencies.

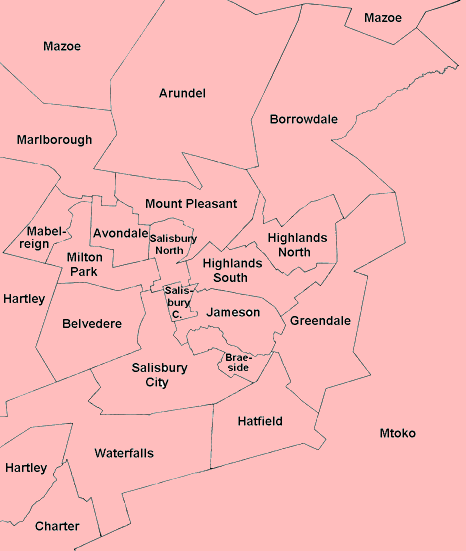
Constituencies in Salisbury.

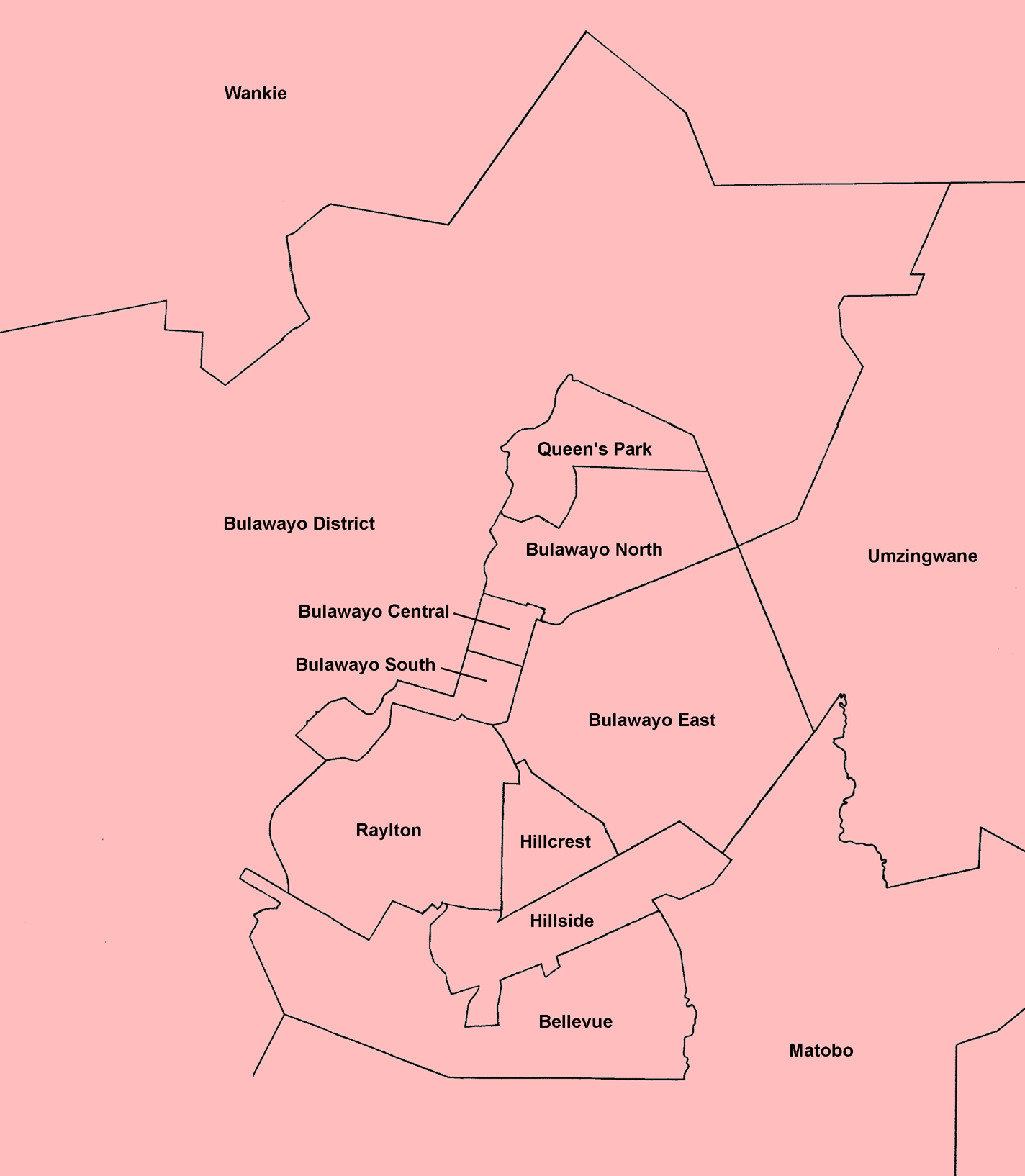
Constituencies in Bulawayo.

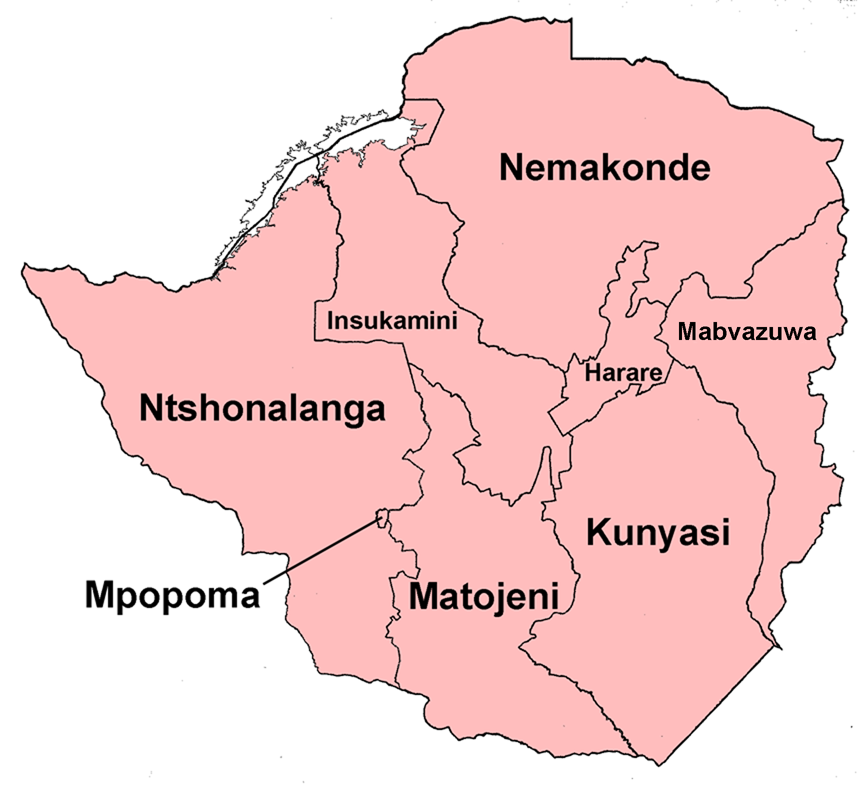
African roll constituencies.

== Results ==
Party	European roll			African roll			Total seats	+/–
Party	Votes	%	Seats	Votes	%	Seats	Total seats	+/–
Rhodesian Front	57,348	85.36	50				50	0
Rhodesian Action Party	6,224	9.26	0				0	New
National Unifying Force	3,002	4.47	0				0	–1
Independents	612	0.91	0	470	100.00	8	8	+7
Tribal representatives							8	0
Total	67,186	100.00	50	470	100.00	8	66	0
Registered voters/turnout	83,825	–		2,604	–			

=== European roll seats ===
Constituency Electorate and turnout	Candidate	Party	Votes	%
ARUNDEL; 2,503 (83.6%)	†Archibald Oliver Garfield Wilson	RF	1,613	77.1
ARUNDEL; 2,503 (83.6%)	Anthony Warner	NUF	256	12.2
ARUNDEL; 2,503 (83.6%)	Gideon Tredoux	RAP	223	10.7
AVONDALE; 2,068 (78.8%)	Brian Stringer	RF	1,412	86.7
AVONDALE; 2,068 (78.8%)	†Colin Eric Barlow	RAP	217	13.3
BELLEVUE; 2,366 (81.9%)	†Wallace Evelyn Stuttaford	RF	1,797	92.8
BELLEVUE; 2,366 (81.9%)	Carel David Theron	RAP	140	7.2
BELVEDERE; 1,944 (79.5%)	†Dennis Divaris	RF	1,247	80.6
BELVEDERE; 1,944 (79.5%)	Randolph Harold Clark	NUF	196	12.7
BELVEDERE; 1,944 (79.5%)	Ernest Roy Wright	RAP	103	6.7
BORROWDALE; 2,900 (81.5%)	†Douglas Hamilton Ritchie	RF	1,759	74.4
BORROWDALE; 2,900 (81.5%)	Lance Halford Reynolds	NUF	354	15.0
BORROWDALE; 2,900 (81.5%)	Robert Sutton	RAP	238	10.1
BORROWDALE; 2,900 (81.5%)	Mrs. Wendy Ann Truen	Ind	12	0.5
BRAESIDE; 1,576 (81.3%)	†Richard Cartwright	RF	1,143	89.2
BRAESIDE; 1,576 (81.3%)	Trevor Bryan Charles Harding	RAP	139	10.8
BULAWAYO CENTRAL; 1,243 (76.5%)	Denys Sinclair Parkin	RF	679	71.4
BULAWAYO CENTRAL; 1,243 (76.5%)	Ewen Cardno Greenfield	NUF	236	24.8
BULAWAYO CENTRAL; 1,243 (76.5%)	Brewster Bryan Whyte	RAP	36	3.8
BULAWAYO DISTRICT; 1,705 (75.1%)	†Alexander Moseley	RF	1,200	93.8
BULAWAYO DISTRICT; 1,705 (75.1%)	Samuel James Shannon	RAP	80	6.2
BULAWAYO EAST; 2,195 (76.9%)	Charles McKenzie Scott	RF	1,315	77.8
BULAWAYO EAST; 2,195 (76.9%)	Arthur Moses Kaplan	NUF	295	17.5
BULAWAYO EAST; 2,195 (76.9%)	Alexander Argyll McCallum	RAP	79	4.7
BULAWAYO NORTH; 1,780 (77.9%)	†Wilfrid Denis Walker	RF	1,282	92.4
BULAWAYO NORTH; 1,780 (77.9%)	Thomas Hayward Pannell	RAP	105	7.6
BULAWAYO SOUTH; 1,059 (69.5%)	George Desmond Chalmers	RF	701	95.2
BULAWAYO SOUTH; 1,059 (69.5%)	Ian Norman Berry	RAP	35	4.8
CHARTER; 1,491 (76.1%)	†Rowan Cronjé	RF	1,023	90.2
CHARTER; 1,491 (76.1%)	Leonard George Idensohn	Ind	111	9.8
EASTERN; 1,319 (81.3%)	Andre Dallein Wassennaar	RF	833	77.7
EASTERN; 1,319 (81.3%)	†John Hamilton Wright	RAP	239	22.3
GATOOMA; 1,421 (84.0%)	†Albert Gannaway Mells	RF	1,094	91.6
GATOOMA; 1,421 (84.0%)	James Wheeler	RAP	100	8.4
GREENDALE; 2,168 (84.2%)	†Mark Henry Heathcote Partridge	RF	1,448	79.3
GREENDALE; 2,168 (84.2%)	Eric Reginald Schofield	RAP	235	12.9
GREENDALE; 2,168 (84.2%)	Simon Dennis Whinney	NUF	142	7.8
GWEBI; 1,319 (83.7%)	Bertram Ankers	RF	764	69.2
GWEBI; 1,319 (83.7%)	†Thomas Ian Fraser Sandeman	RAP	207	18.8
GWEBI; 1,319 (83.7%)	George Alfred Pio	Ind	133	12.0
GWELO; 1,308 (80.1%)	†Roger Hawkins	RF	975	93.1
GWELO; 1,308 (80.1%)	Michael Patrick John Huggins	RAP	55	5.2
GWELO; 1,308 (80.1%)	David Timothy Torbet Frost	Ind	18	1.7
HARTLEY; 2,254 (80.8%)	†P. K. van der Byl	RF	1,604	88.0
HARTLEY; 2,254 (80.8%)	Jacobus Ignatius de Wet	RAP	218	12.0
HATFIELD; 1,816 (84.8%)	†Frederick Roy Simmonds	RF	1,303	84.6
HATFIELD; 1,816 (84.8%)	†Edward Aylett Sutton-Pryce	RAP	197	12.8
HATFIELD; 1,816 (84.8%)	Neville Ronald Arthur Skeates	NUF	40	2.6
HIGHLANDS NORTH; 1,860 (83.2%)	†Fergus Blackie	RF	1,082	69.9
HIGHLANDS NORTH; 1,860 (83.2%)	Allan Savory	NUF	318	20.6
HIGHLANDS NORTH; 1,860 (83.2%)	Marie Joseph Claude de Chasteigner Dumée-Duval	RAP	147	9.5
HIGHLANDS SOUTH; 1,960 (84.4%)	John Christie	RF	1,266	76.5
HIGHLANDS SOUTH; 1,960 (84.4%)	†Richard Hope Hall	RAP	230	13.9
HIGHLANDS SOUTH; 1,960 (84.4%)	David Frank Sutherland	NUF	158	9.6
HILLCREST; 1,703 (84.9%)	James Patrick Thrush	RF	1,331	92.0
HILLCREST; 1,703 (84.9%)	Edwin Stanley O'Connor	RAP	115	8.0
HILLSIDE; 1,876 (81.3%)	William Redpath Kinleyside	RF	1,382	90.6
HILLSIDE; 1,876 (81.3%)	Owen Victor Parvess	RAP	143	9.4
JAMESON; 1,704 (82.7%)	Robert James Gaunt	RF	1,242	88.1
JAMESON; 1,704 (82.7%)	†John Peter Broberg Nilson	RAP	167	11.9
KAROI; 1,260 (76.0%)	†Jan Jacobus Buitendag	RF	861	90.0
KAROI; 1,260 (76.0%)	Donovan Hilgard Erasmus	NUF	96	10.0
MABELREIGN; 1,966 (82.1%)	†John Cornelius Gleig	RF	1,420	87.9
MABELREIGN; 1,966 (82.1%)	Adrian Thomas Wymer	RAP	195	12.1
MARANDELLAS; 1,501 (83.7%)	†David Colville Smith	RF	1,086	86.4
MARANDELLAS; 1,501 (83.7%)	William John Raymond Pratt	RAP	171	13.6
MARLBOROUGH; 2,211 (82.6%)	†William Michie Irvine	RF	1,477	80.9
MARLBOROUGH; 2,211 (82.6%)	John Frederick Handford	RAP	188	10.3
MARLBOROUGH; 2,211 (82.6%)	Ivor Cordner McCormick	NUF	161	8.8
MATOBO; 1,680 (84.1%)	Donald Galbraith Goddard	RF	1,262	89.3
MATOBO; 1,680 (84.1%)	†Robert Henry Warren McGee	RAP	151	10.7
MAZOE; 1,652 (80.4%)	†George Rollo Hayman	RF	1,184	89.1
MAZOE; 1,652 (80.4%)	Robin Elliot Campbell-Logan	RAP	145	10.9
MIDLANDS; 1,264 (79.7%)	†Henry Swan Elsworth	RF	903	89.7
MIDLANDS; 1,264 (79.7%)	Kennith Hahn	RAP	104	10.3
MILTON PARK; 1,703 (81.3%)	†John Alfred Landau	RF	1,171	84.6
MILTON PARK; 1,703 (81.3%)	Ratilal Damodard Devchand	NUF	116	8.4
MILTON PARK; 1,703 (81.3%)	Peter Michael Nursten	RAP	97	7.0
MOUNT PLEASANT; 1,938 (73.0%)	†Jonas Christian Andersen	RF	1,295	91.5
MOUNT PLEASANT; 1,938 (73.0%)	Julian Richard Haw	RAP	120	8.5
MTOKO; 1,752 (80.6%)	Stanley Norman Eastwood	RF	1,044	73.9
MTOKO; 1,752 (80.6%)	†Rodney Guy Swayne Simmonds	RAP	187	13.3
MTOKO; 1,752 (80.6%)	Diana Mitchell	NUF	181	12.8
QUEEN'S PARK; 1,521 (83.5%)	†Arthur Denis Crook	RF	1,189	93.6
QUEEN'S PARK; 1,521 (83.5%)	Bazil Geoffrey de Lorme	RAP	81	6.4
QUE QUE; 1,731 (83.3%)	†Jacobus Johannes Burger	RF	1,265	87.7
QUE QUE; 1,731 (83.3%)	William Gerald Kaschula	RAP	90	6.2
QUE QUE; 1,731 (83.3%)	William Harris Keys	NUF	87	6.1
RAYLTON; 1,922 (76.0%)	†Patrick Francis Shields	RF	1,385	94.8
RAYLTON; 1,922 (76.0%)	Norman John Western	RAP	76	5.2
RUSAPE; 1,344 (78.1%)	Jacobus Phillipus du Plessis	RF	934	89.0
RUSAPE; 1,344 (78.1%)	Gerhardus Paulus Johannes Swart	RAP	116	11.0
SALISBURY CENTRAL; 1,245 (74.6%)	†Hilary Squires	RF	778	83.7
SALISBURY CENTRAL; 1,245 (74.6%)	Raymond Stallwood	RAP	76	8.2
SALISBURY CENTRAL; 1,245 (74.6%)	Mrs. Eileen Penny Brown	NUF	75	8.1
SALISBURY CITY; 1,392 (75.5%)	Ivor Pitch	RF	681	64.8
SALISBURY CITY; 1,392 (75.5%)	Ahrn Palley	Ind	333	31.7
SALISBURY CITY; 1,392 (75.5%)	Anthony Charles Edward Scrace	RAP	32	3.0
SALISBURY CITY; 1,392 (75.5%)	Leslie Thomas Hayes	Ind	5	0.5
SALISBURY NORTH; 1,613 (79.9%)	†André Sothern Holland	RF	1,063	82.5
SALISBURY NORTH; 1,613 (79.9%)	Eric David Drought Syme	NUF	135	10.5
SALISBURY NORTH; 1,613 (79.9%)	Mark Fraser McLean	RAP	90	7.0
SELUKWE; 1,812 (80.8%)	†John Morris Lowenthal	RF	1,330	90.8
SELUKWE; 1,812 (80.8%)	Anthony William Baumann	RAP	135	9.2
SHABANI; 1,219 (76.5%)	Theunis Christian de Klerk	RF	872	93.6
SHABANI; 1,219 (76.5%)	Johannes Jacobus Hulley	RAP	60	6.4
SINOIA/UMVUKWES; 1,535 (75.8%)	†Esmond Meryl Micklem	RF	1,085	93.3
SINOIA/UMVUKWES; 1,535 (75.8%)	Roland Oliver Davis	NUF	78	6.7
UMTALI EAST; 1,588 (78.7%)	†Bernard Horace Mussett	RF	1,122	89.8
UMTALI EAST; 1,588 (78.7%)	Mrs. Vera Aileen Winter	RAP	127	10.2
UMTALI WEST; 1,426 (81.0%)	Desmond Butler	RF	983	85.1
UMTALI WEST; 1,426 (81.0%)	Robert Traill Galvin	RAP	94	8.1
UMTALI WEST; 1,426 (81.0%)	John Oswald Meikle	NUF	78	6.8
UMZINGWANE; 1,726	†Ian Douglas Smith	RF	unopposed	
VICTORIA; 2,071 (78.9%)	Ormonde Corrington George	RF	1,408	86.2
VICTORIA; 2,071 (78.9%)	†Gordon Richard Olds	RAP	226	13.8
WANKIE; 1,425 (75.1%)	Donald Goldin	RF	977	91.3
WANKIE; 1,425 (75.1%)	William Ernest McNeir	RAP	93	8.7
WATERFALLS; 1,516 (79.2%)	Albertus Herman du Toit	RF	1,078	89.8
WATERFALLS; 1,516 (79.2%)	John Duncan Oliver	RAP	122	10.2

=== African seats ===
Constituency Electorate and turnout	Candidate	Party	Votes	%
HARARE; 1,210 (21.1%)	Ronnie Sadomba	Ind	147	57.6
HARARE; 1,210 (21.1%)	Tiriwanhu Mudzimu	Ind	83	32.6
HARARE; 1,210 (21.1%)	David Munyamana	Ind	15	5.9
HARARE; 1,210 (21.1%)	Milton Jack Makaya	Ind	10	3.9
INSUKAMINI; 514 (21.8%)	†John Zachary Maposa	Ind	86	76.8
INSUKAMINI; 514 (21.8%)	Edward Gabriel Watungwa	Ind	26	23.2
KUNYASI; 1,651	†Thomas Tavagwisa Zawaira	Ind	unopposed	
MABVAZUWA; 1,001	†Elijah Smile Gende Magavan Nyandoro	Ind	unopposed	
MATOJENI; 852	†Lot Enoch Dewa	Ind	unopposed	
MPOPOMA; 434	Lwazi Joel Mahlangu	Ind	unopposed	
NEMAKONDE; 880 (11.7%)	William Benjamin Chimpaka	Ind	77	74.8
NEMAKONDE; 880 (11.7%)	Fanuel Maruta	Ind	26	25.2
NTSHONALANGA; 836	†Micah Mahamba Bhebe	Ind	unopposed	

=== Tribal seats ===
- HIGHVELD: †Bartholomew Augustine Mabika
- KARIBA: †Peter Mhletshwa Nkomo
- LOWVELD: Simeon Chengeta
- MANICA: †Naboth Absalom Gandanzara
- PAGATI: †Fani Mlingo
- PIONEER: Benjamin Panga Mbuisa
- TULI: †Zephaniah Maybin Bafanah Dube
- ZAMBEZI: Mawire Patrick Bwanya

== Subsequent by-elections ==
=== Pagati ===
Fani Mlingo died on 15 February 1978. On 31 March 1978, Joseph Jumo Bheka was returned unopposed to replace him. Bheka was a supporter of Bishop Abel Muzorewa.

=== Lowveld ===
Simeon Chengeta died on 19 March 1978. On 19 July 1978, a by-election was held in Lowveld. John Adonia Hungwe defeated Simon Dzichaperanhamo Bhene.

=== Highlands North ===
A by-election was held in the Highlands North constituency on 21 July 1978 to replace Fergus Blackie, who had been appointed as a Judge and resigned on 15 May 1978. This by-election occurred after the internal settlement agreement, and the Rhodesian Front candidate was therefore opposed not only by the National Unifying Force (pressing for a full settlement with African nationalists) but by two right-wing candidates opposed to any deals: the Rhodesian Action Party and the Rhodesian Conservative Alliance.

Constituency	Candidate	Party	Votes	%
HIGHLANDS NORTH	Reginald Reed Beaver	RF	545	49.1
HIGHLANDS NORTH	Clifford Allan Redin Savory	NUF	354	31.9
HIGHLANDS NORTH	Marie Joseph Claude de Chasteigner Dumée-Duval	RAP	158	14.2
HIGHLANDS NORTH	Noel Allison Hunt	RCA	52	4.7

=== Gwelo ===
Roger Hawkins resigned from the Assembly due to ill health on 30 November 1978, leading to a by-election in Gwelo on 30 January 1979.

Constituency	Candidate	Party	Votes	%
GWELO	Trevor Duncan Dollar	RF	762	84.7
GWELO	Reginald James McLean	RAP	138	15.3

=== Mazoe ===
George Rollo Hayman resigned on 27 December 1978, claiming that the power-sharing government could easily fall under the control of a terrorist group. He then resigned from the Assembly to seek re-election. This by-election, held on 6 February 1979, was the last election conducted before the advent of the new constitution.

Constituency	Candidate	Party	Votes	%
MAZOE	Cecil Millar	RF	611	78.7
MAZOE	George Rollo Hayman	Ind	165	21.3

=== Vacancy at dissolution ===
Donald Goldin (Wankie) died on 12 February 1979. The seat was not filled before Parliament was dissolved.
