= Andrew Skeen (Rhodesia) =

Rhodesian politician and army officer

Brigadier Andrew Skeen ICD OBE

High Commissioner of Southern Rhodesia to the United Kingdom
- In office 22 July 1965 – 12 November 1965
- Preceded by: Evan Campbell
- Succeeded by: Sydney Brice (as chargé)

Member of the Southern Rhodesian Legislative Assembly for Arundel
- In office 14 January 1966 – 10 April 1970
- Preceded by: Clifford Dupont
- Succeeded by: Parliament dissolved

Member of the House of Assembly of Rhodesia for Arundel
- In office 10 April 1970 – 30 July 1974
- Preceded by: New seat
- Succeeded by: Archibald Wilson

Personal details
- Born: 3 October 1906 British India
- Died: 11 May 1984 (aged 77–78) Bothas Hill South Africa
- Resting place: Hillcrest South Africa
- Party: Rhodesian Front
- Relations: Andrew Skeen (father) Chris Mann (poet) son in law

Military service
- Allegiance: United Kingdom
- Branch/service: British Army
- Years of service: 1926–1947
- Rank: Brigadier
- Battles/wars: World War II

Brigadier Andrew Skeen ICD OBE (c. 1906 – 11 May 1984) was a British Army officer, and Rhodesian politician who served as the last High Commissioner from Rhodesia to the United Kingdom.

== Early life and career ==
Born in India, Skeen was the son of General Sir Andrew Skeen. He was commissioned into the British Army in 1926, rising to the rank of Brigadier. He retired from the British Army in 1947 and moved to the self-governing colony of Southern Rhodesia and settled in Vumba in Umtali district. Skeen opposed the creation of the Federation of Rhodesia and Nyasaland in 1953, as he saw it as not in the best interests of the white community in Southern Rhodesia, and by 1962, Skeen had joined the Rhodesian Front party of Ian Smith.

== High Commissioner ==
Skeen served as the High Commissioner for Rhodesia in London from 22 July to 12 November 1965. His total tenure lasted 115 days.

On 11 November 1965, when Rhodesia announced its Unilateral Declaration of Independence (UDI), Skeen was summoned by the Secretary of State for Commonwealth Relations, Arthur Bottomley, for a meeting at 1.15pm where Bottomley ordered Skeen to denounce the UDI or face being declared persona non grata with the removal of all privileges and expulsion from 13 November. Skeen refused and departed London voluntarily the following day on 12 November 1965, although Rhodesia House (the High Commission) continued to function as a representative office with no official diplomatic status. Skeen's functions were assumed by chargé d'affaires Sydney Brice, who was officially regarded as "The Southern Rhodesian Representative" by the British Foreign Office.

== Later life ==
On his return from London, Skeen was elected unopposed to the Southern Rhodesian Legislative Assembly (the House of Assembly from 1970) seat of Arundel in the 14 January 1966 by-election caused by the resignation of Clifford Dupont who had been appointed Officer Administering the Government after the UDI. He was re-elected for a second term at the 1970 general election but stood down at the 1974 general election and was succeeded by another former serviceman, Air Marshal Archibald Wilson.

== Honours ==
Ribbon	Description	Notes
	Independence Commemorative Decoration (ICD)	
	Officer of the Order of the British Empire (OBE; Military Division)	NY 1945
	1939–1945 Star	
	Africa Star	
	Burma Star	
	Defence Medal	
	War Medal 1939–1945	

Diplomatic posts
Preceded by Evan Campbell	High Commissioner of Southern Rhodesia to the United Kingdom; 1965	Succeeded by Sydney Brice as chargé d'affaires
Southern Rhodesian Legislative Assembly
Preceded by Clifford Dupont	Member of Parliament for Arundel; 1966 – 1970	Parliament dissolved
House of Assembly of Rhodesia
New constituency	Member of Parliament for Arundel; 1970 – 1974	Succeeded by Archibald Wilson
