= Sadomba =

Sadomba is a Zimbabwean surname. Notable people with the surname include:

- Edward Sadomba, a Zimbabwean footballer
- Ronnie Sadomba, a Zimbabwean politician
