= Douglas Hamilton Ritchie =

Rhodesian dentist and politician (1918–1999)

The Honourable Douglas Hamilton Ritchie FDSRCS, FDSRCSEd, MP

Member of Parliament for Borrowdale
- In office 1965–1979
- Preceded by: Peter Heaton Grey
- Succeeded by: Hilary Squires
- Constituency: Borrowdale

Personal details
- Born: 14 February 1918 Saint Andrew Parish, Colony of Jamaica
- Died: 1999 (aged 80–81) South Africa
- Education: Royal College of Surgeons of Edinburgh; Royal College of Surgeons of England (LDS)
- Occupation: Dentist; politician

Military service
- Allegiance: United Kingdom
- Branch/service: Royal Air Force
- Years of service: 1941–1945
- Rank: Flying Officer
- Battles/wars: World War II

Douglas Archibald Hamilton Ritchie (14 February 1918 – 1999) was a Rhodesian dentist and politician. Born in the Colony of Jamaica to British parents, his family moved to the United Kingdom in his youth. After serving in the Royal Air Force during World War II, he moved to Southern Rhodesia and practised dentistry. He soon became one of the leading dentists in Rhodesia, and was elected to the Medical Council of Rhodesia in 1958. He entered politics in the 1960s, joining Rhodesian Front and representing the Salisbury suburb of Borrowdale as a member of parliament from 1965 to 1979. In the years following Zimbabwe's independence and the demise of Rhodesia, he emigrated to South Africa and engaged in general practice, dying there in 1999.

== Early life and education ==
Douglas Archibald Hamilton Ritchie was born on 14 February 1918 in Crossroads, Saint Andrew Parish in the Colony of Jamaica. His parents, originally from the United Kingdom, were Blanch Louise Reid and Archibald Hamilton Ritchie, a University of Glasgow alumnus. His family moved back to Britain in his youth. Hamilton Ritchie went on to dentistry, earning his Licentiate in Dental Surgery from the Royal College of Surgeons of England in 1941. He was awarded the Fellowship of Dental Surgery of the Royal College of Surgeons of England (FDRSCS), and in 1969, awarded the Fellowship of Dental Surgery of the Royal College of Surgeons of Edinburgh (FDRSCSEd).

=== World War II service ===
After earning his Licentiate of Dental Surgery in 1941, and after qualification to practice dentistry, Hamilton Ritchie commenced service in the Royal Air Force amidst World War II, being granted commission as a Dental Branch flying officer on 13 May 1941. He served at the plastic and jaw injuries unit at East Grinstead, Sussex, and became a consultant specialist in dental surgery to the Ministry of Health.

== Career in Rhodesia ==
Following the end of the war, Hamilton Ritchie remained in Britain for several years, before emigrating to Southern Rhodesia in 1950, where he commenced general and consultant practice. He soon became one of the leading dentists in the colony. He was appointed honorary oral surgeon to the Salisbury hospital system, and in 1958 was elected to the Medical Council of Rhodesia.

=== Political career ===
In 1965, Hamilton Ritchie was elected to the Rhodesian House of Assembly, representing the constituency of Borrowdale, a suburb of Salisbury, as a member of the party Rhodesian Front. In 1970, he ran for re-election, defeating Centre Party challenger Thomas Bashford with 63% of the vote. He ran for re-election again in 1974, defeating Rhodesia Party candidate Peter Bridger and the independent Wendy Ann Truen with 66% of vote. He ran for re-election for the last time in 1977, defeating with 74% of the vote challengers Lance Halford Reynolds of the National Unifying Force, Robert Sutton of the Rhodesian Action Party, and the independent Wendy Ann Truen.

In the years following Zimbabwe's independence, Hamilton Ritchie emigrated to South Africa and continued to practice dentistry. He died there in 1999.

== Electoral history ==
Year	Office	Constituency	Candidate			Candidate		
Year	Office	Constituency	Name	Party	%	Name	Party	%
1965	Member of Parliament	Borrowdale	Douglas Hamilton Ritchie	RF				
1970	Member of Parliament	Borrowdale	Douglas Hamilton Ritchie	RF	62.6	Thomas Bashford	CP	37.4
1974	Member of Parliament	Borrowdale	Douglas Hamilton Ritchie	RF	65.5	Peter Bridger	RP	34.3
1974	Member of Parliament	Borrowdale	Douglas Hamilton Ritchie	RF	65.5	Wendy Ann Truen	Ind.	0.2
1977	Member of Parliament	Borrowdale	Douglas Hamilton Ritchie	RF	74.4	Lance Halford Reynolds	NUF	15.0
1977	Member of Parliament	Borrowdale	Douglas Hamilton Ritchie	RF	74.4	Robert Sutton	RAP	10.1
1977	Member of Parliament	Borrowdale	Douglas Hamilton Ritchie	RF	74.4	Wendy Ann Truen	Ind.	0.5
