= Marshall P. Baron =

Rhodesian painter

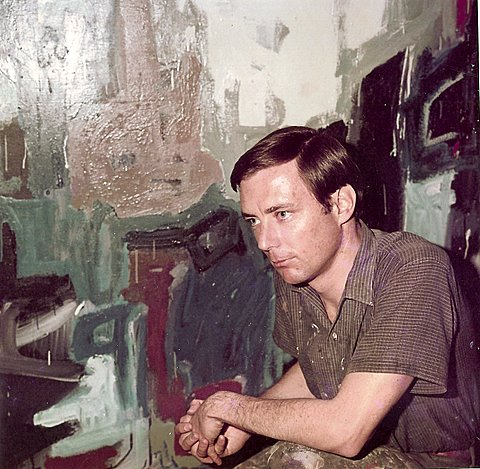
- Baron in 1967
- Born: Marshall Philip Baron; 3 August 1934; Bulawayo, Rhodesia
- Died: 3 March 1977 (aged 42); Bulawayo, Rhodesia (now Zimbabwe)
- Education: Skowhegan School of Art

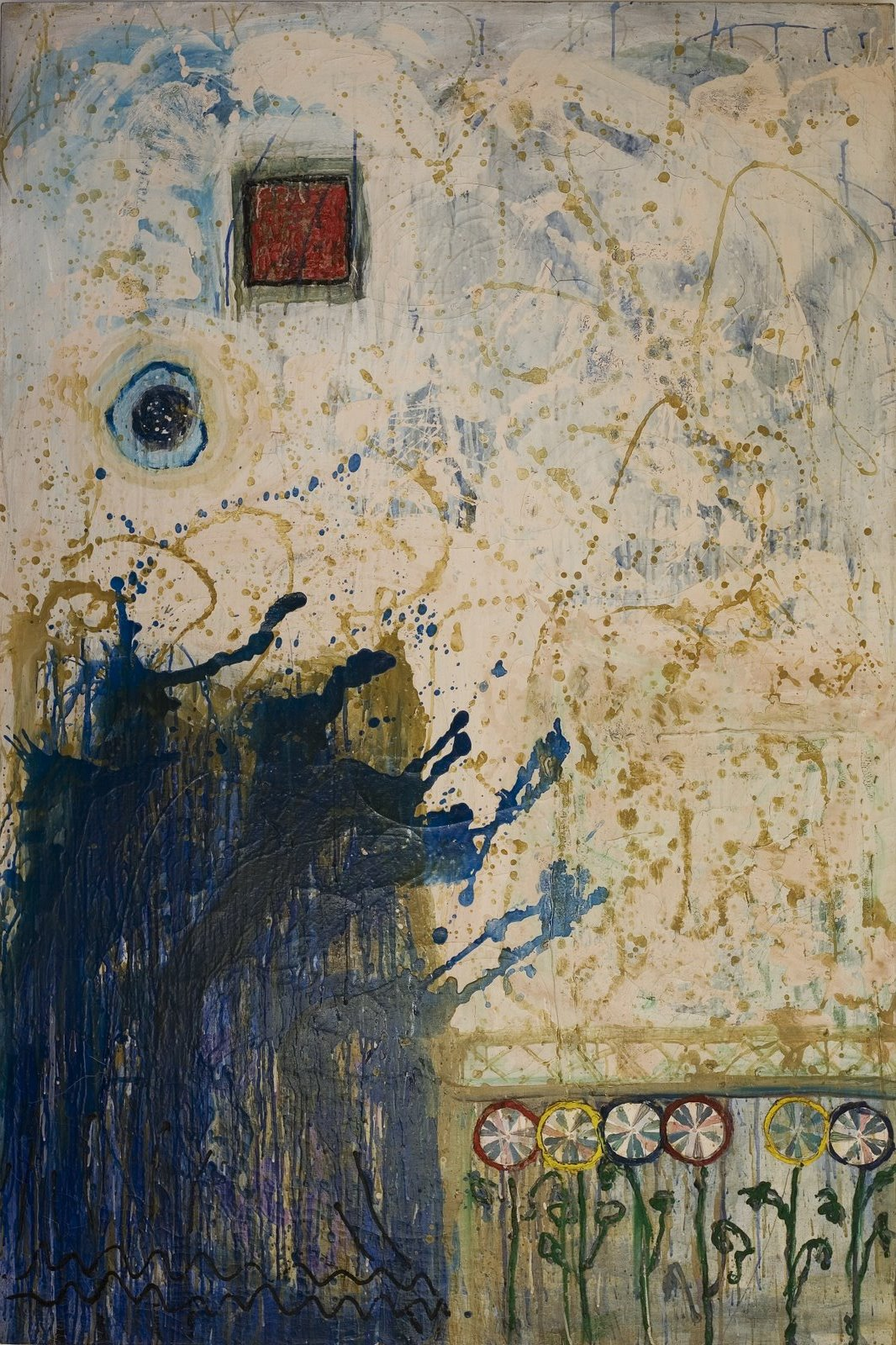
Flowers for Algernon

Marshall Philip Baron (1934–1977) was a Rhodesian painter. He exhibited in the United States and South Africa, as well as in Rhodesia (which was renamed Zimbabwe in 1980). Some of his paintings are today in the National Gallery of Zimbabwe.

== Life ==
Baron was born on 3 August in Bulawayo, Rhodesia, to Rachel and Ben Baron. Between 1951 and 1956, he studied at Cape Town University, South Africa, and had the first of many art exhibitions in Southern Africa in 1954. He practised as a lawyer in Bulawayo from 1957 and was the music critic for the Bulawayo newspaper The Chronicle from 1962.

In the 1970s, Baron played an active role in the liberal Central African Party and Centre Party. He stood as an independent candidate for the Matobo District in the General Election in 1974.

Baron died suddenly on 3 May 1977 in Bulawayo at the age of 42.

== Exhibitions ==
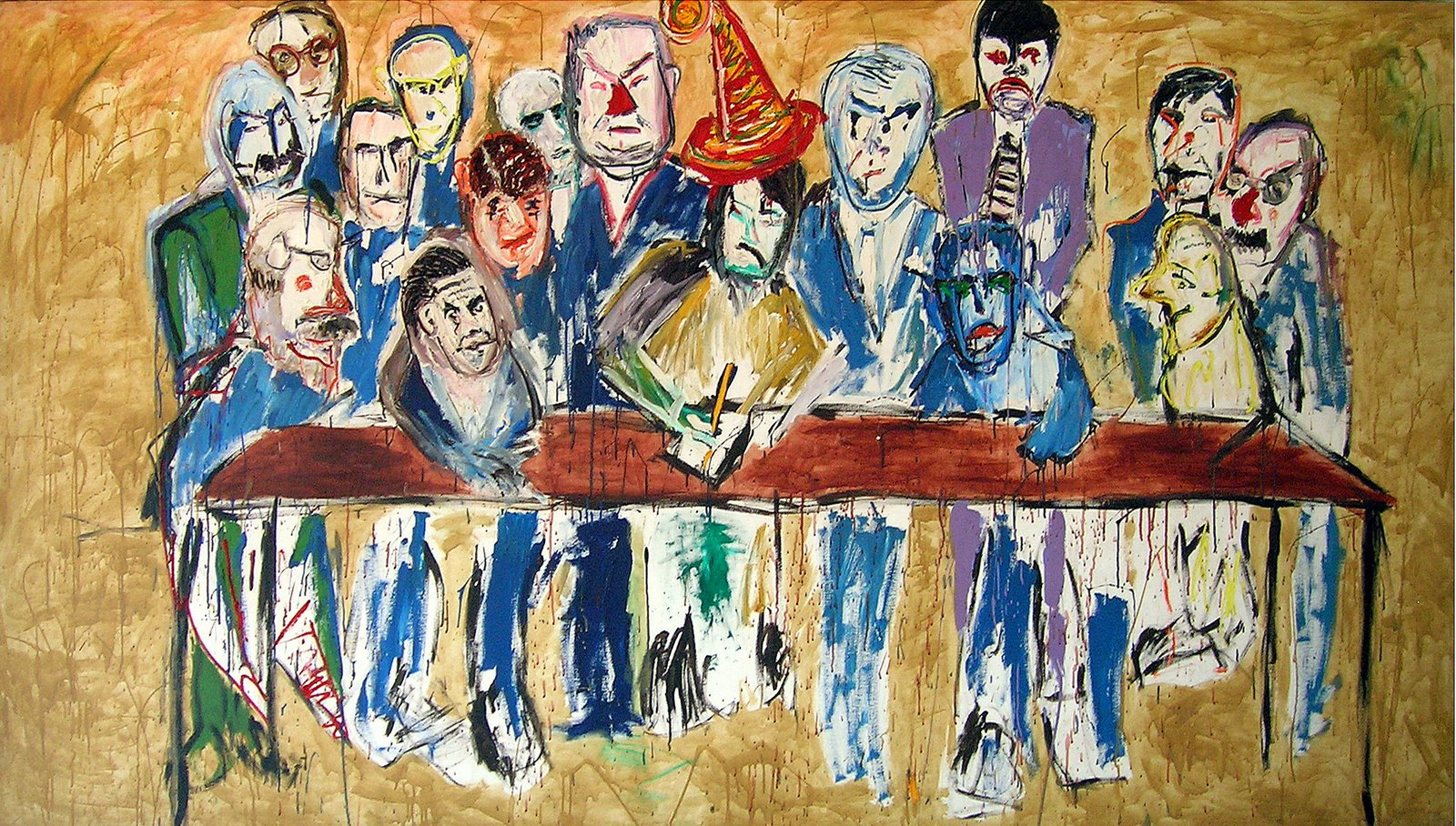
UDI Plotters

- 1964-Gallery 101, Johannesburg, South Africa.
- 1967-Goodman Gallery, Johannesburg, South Africa.
- 2008-Marshall Baron 30 Year Retrospective, Gebo Art Space, Tel Aviv, Israel.
- 2011-National Gallery of Zimbabwe, Harare, Zimbabwe.
