= Bill Kinleyside =

Rhodesian politician (1910 - 1980)

Mayor of Bulawayo
- In office 1967–1968

Member of the Rhodesian House of Assembly for Hillside
- In office 1977–1979
- Preceded by: Dennis Phillips
- Succeeded by: Constituency abolished

Personal details
- Born: 1910 Berwick, Northumberland, England
- Died: 1980 (aged 70) Bulawayo, Zimbabwe
- Party: Rhodesian Front
- Spouse: Una Kinleyside

Military service
- Branch/service: Royal Air Force
- Battles/wars: Second World War

William Redpath Kinleyside (1910 – 1980), also known as Bill Kinleyside, was a Rhodesian politician who served as Mayor of Bulawayo from 1967 to 1968 and later represented the Hillside constituency in the House of Assembly for the Rhodesian Front from 1977 to 1979. A long-serving Bulawayo councillor, he was regarded as one of the city's more prominent civic figures of the UDI period.

== Early life ==
Born in 1910 in Berwick, Northumberland, to John J. Kinlayside and Christina Redpath. He trained and worked in the clothing trade before emigrating to southern Africa. Kinleyside served in the Royal Air Force during the Second World War, before settling in Bulawayo after the conflict.

== Municipal career ==
Kinleyside became active in Bulawayo municipal politics during the post-war period, when the city was expanding rapidly as Rhodesia's principal industrial centre. By the mid-1960s he was a member of the Bulawayo City Council, and in 1967 he was elected mayor, holding office until 1968.

As mayor, Kinleyside presided over Bulawayo's 75th anniversary celebrations in 1968, which coincided with the city's annual International Trade Fair. Contemporary reports describe how, in his capacity as mayor, he conferred the Freedom of the City of Bulawayo on the Rhodesian prime minister Ian Smith at a ceremony at the Trade Fair grounds, praising Smith's "ability to think clearly and stand firm in a crisis".

Kinleyside was also involved in debates over the relationship between local and central government in late-UDI Rhodesia. A 2018 study of Bulawayo's African townships cites a 1968 Bulawayo Chronicle report titled "Kinleyside shocked: 'A dictatorial attitude', he says", in which the mayor criticised proposed Municipal legislation as granting "dictatorial" powers to the minister of local government, reflecting Bulawayo Council's strong tradition of defending municipal autonomy against central interference.

A later memoir of Bulawayo school life refers to "old Bill Kinleyside (long-standing Mayor of Bulawayo)" as a familiar figure at inter-school athletics meetings, suggesting that he remained a visible and active local personality beyond his formal mayoral term.

== Parliamentary career ==
Kinleyside was associated with the Rhodesian Front (RF), the conservative white-minority party founded in 1962. In the 1962 Southern Rhodesian general election he stood as the RF candidate for the Hillside constituency of the Southern Rhodesian Legislative Assembly, but was defeated by the incumbent United Federal Party (UFP) MP, Maureen Thelma Watson, who was re-elected with 55.7 per cent of the vote to Kinleyside's 44.3 per cent.

Fifteen years later, in the 1977 Rhodesian general election, Kinleyside again contested Hillside, this time successfully. Standing as the RF candidate for the white roll seat, he won 1,382 votes (90.6 per cent), defeating Rhodesia Action Party candidate Owen Victor Parvess. The election returned an overwhelming Rhodesian Front majority in what proved to be the last general election held under the 1970 Rhodesian constitution. His constituency was abolished when the Internal Settlement was adopted and he did not stand in the subsequent 1979 Rhodesian general election.

== Personal life ==
Kinleyside was commonly referred to as "Bill" in contemporary accounts and later reminiscences. He was married to Una Kinleyside (1912–1999) and had children, some of whom later emigrated from Zimbabwe. Kinleyside died in 1980, aged 70.

== Legacy ==
Although a relatively obscure figure in wider Rhodesian political history, Kinleyside occupies a place in the civic history of Bulawayo as one of a succession of post-war mayors who helped oversee the city's expansion and its contentious relations with the central government during the UDI era. Historians of Bulawayo's municipal politics have cited his public criticism of centralising legislation as emblematic of the city council's determination to defend local autonomy.

== See also ==
- List of mayors of Bulawayo
- Rhodesian Front
