= Embassy of Zimbabwe, London =

Embassy of Zimbabwe in London
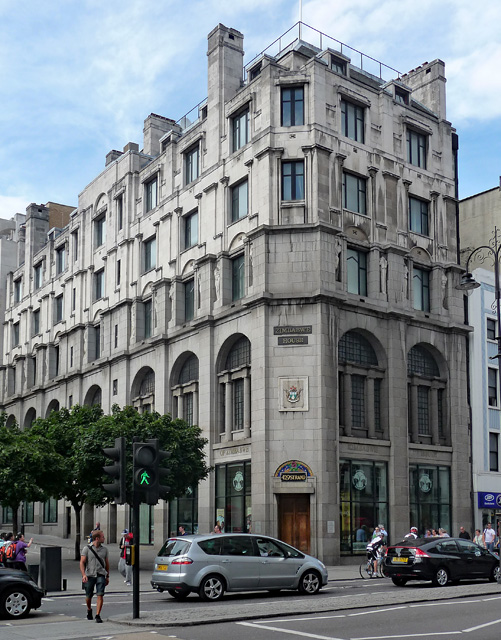
- Location: Covent Garden, London
- Address: 429 Strand, London, WC2R 0JR
- Coordinates: 51.5096°N 0.1240°W
- Ambassador: Gabriel Mharadze Machinga

The Embassy of Zimbabwe in London is the diplomatic mission of Zimbabwe in the United Kingdom. It is located in Zimbabwe House, a Grade II* listed building at 429 Strand in central London. It was previously a high commission and became an embassy after Zimbabwe's departure from the Commonwealth on 7 December 2003 in protest of international criticism of Robert Mugabe's regime's human rights record and its policies.

== History ==
=== Architecture and sculptures ===
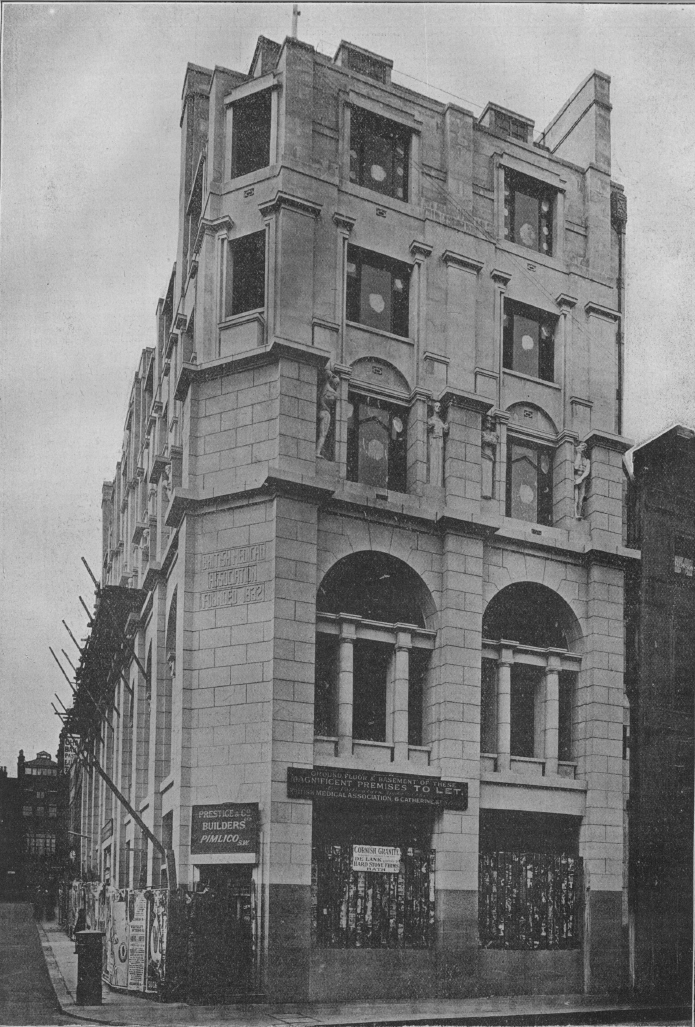
Strand

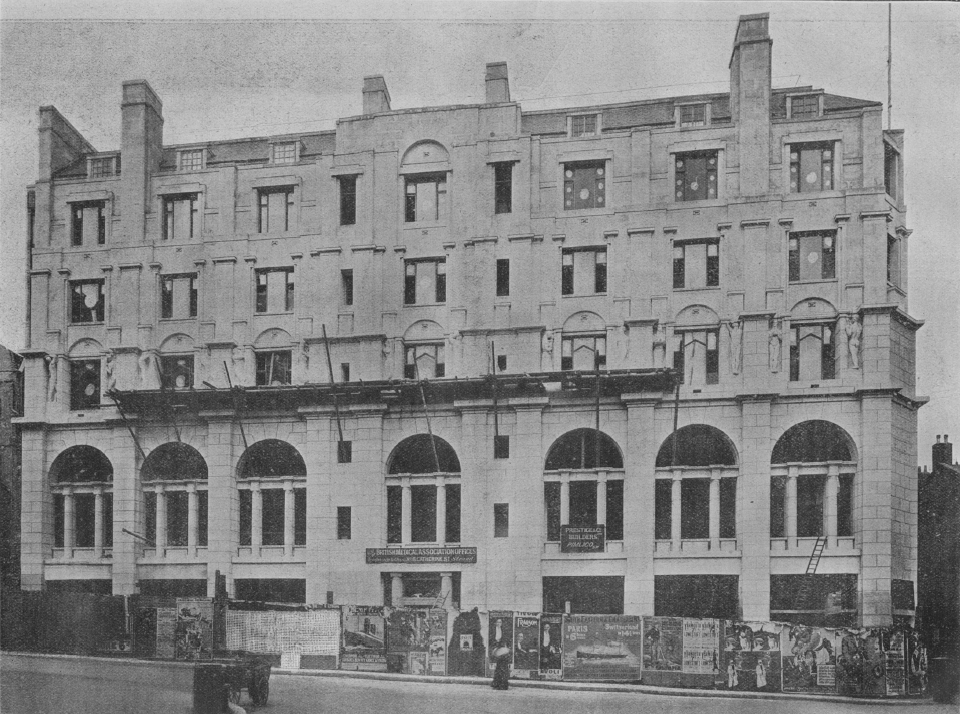
Agar Street

British Medical Association Building, 1908

The building was designed by architect Charles Holden in 1907–08 as the headquarters of the British Medical Association and featured a series of sculptures by Jacob Epstein representing the development of science and the Ages of Man, his first major commission in London. (Note: Epstein's description of the sculptures: "The series represent symbolical figures of scientific study and research, and a presentment of Life, its origin and growth. Apart from my desire to decorate a beautiful building, I have wished to create noble and heroic forms to express in sculpture the great primal facts of man and woman. The first figure starting on the Strand side presents Primal Energy, a symbolic male figure who, with outstretched arm in a forceful gesture as if pressing its way through mists and vapours, blows the breath of life into the atom. Next 'Matter,' a figure of rude and primitive aspect, who folds in his arms a mass of rock in which is vaguely infolded the form of a child; thus form and life emerge from the inchoate and lifeless, Hygeia, symbolic figure of the Goddess of Medicine and Health, holds the – cup and serpent. Chemical Research, a male figure intently examining a retort. Academic Research, a male figure examining a scroll; these two figures form the corner decoration of the building; on Agar Street come 'Mentality,' the Brain, a figure holding a winged skull, symbol of Thought. Next is the Newborn, an old woman presents the newly-born child in a cloth. Youth, an aspiring figure with head and arms upraised. Man, a figure of man in his energy and virility. To-day the use of great words like 'virility' has become so smirched by coarse shame that it becomes a hazardous thing for an artist to use them in a description of his work. This figure looks towards a figure of Maternity, a brooding mother holding a child in her arms. The figures that follow represent Youth, joy in life, youths and maidens reaching stretching arms towards each other; they represent young life, puberty ('puberty' is another word that is banned). Throughout I have wished to give a presentation of figures joyous, energetic, and mystical. That the figures should have an ideal aspect, be possessed of an inner life, is a requirement of sculpture, and also they should adhere to the forms of Nature, the divine aspect of bodies; it is very difficult for me to say in words much that I have wished to put into these figures; the bald description does not sound adequate; they will suggest meanings I cannot express in words.") The nakedness of many of these sculptures was considered shocking by certain sections of the press, with the London Evening Standard newspaper launching an attack on the sculptures as soon as the protective hoardings were removed. The newspaper claimed, that Epstein had erected "a form of statuary which no careful father would wish his daughter, or no discriminating young man, his fiancée, to see". With the acquisition of the building by the Government of Southern Rhodesia in 1935 the battle over the statues continued as the Southern Rhodesian regime sought permission to have the sculptures removed. Despite claims that one of the heads of the sculptures fell onto a passer-by, thereby giving the Southern Rhodesians an excuse to mutilate the sculptures, there is no evidence that this is the case. Rather what seems to have happened is that a piece of one of the sculptures came away as bunting attached to them to celebrate the coronation of King George VI in 1937 was being removed. Epstein believed this was used by the Southern Rhodesians as an excuse to mutilate the statues on safety grounds. Despite protests, no independent survey was permitted and Epstein himself was refused permission to inspect the sculptures to see if they were as dangerous as claimed.

=== Rhodesian High Commission ===
As Rhodesia House it housed the High Commission of Southern Rhodesia from 1923 until Rhodesia's Unilateral Declaration of Independence on 11 November 1965. Rhodesia was unique in being the only British colony to have a High Commission, as only dominions (and later, independent Commonwealth members) were represented by such legations. During the period of the Federation of Rhodesia and Nyasaland from 1953, Rhodesia House was home to the High Commissioner for the Federation. With the end of the Federation in 1963, Rhodesia House returned as home of the representative of Southern Rhodesia.

After the UDI, Rhodesia's High Commissioner, Brigadier Andrew Skeen departed on 12 November 1965 before being declared persona non-grata by the British Government and ordered to leave the country. However, because of concerns over diplomatic property under international law, Rhodesia House was not seized by the British Government. It simply became a Representative Office with no official diplomatic status, until the country became Zimbabwe in 1980.

=== Zimbabwe ===
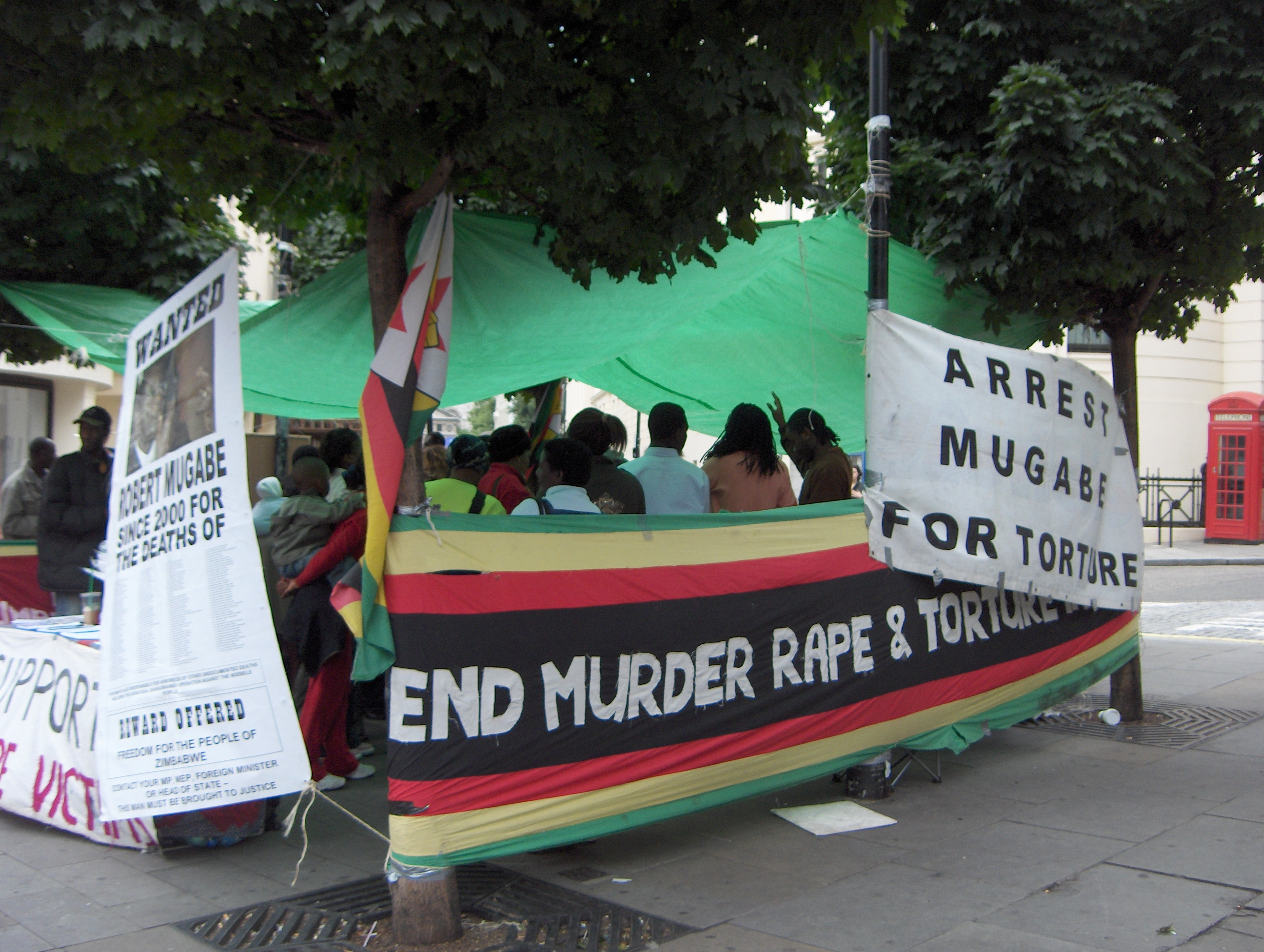
A protest against the regime of Robert Mugabe in front of Zimbabwe House in 2006

The embassy is frequently the focus of protests against the Zimbabwean government, especially the former regime of President Robert Mugabe.

The South African Business Day newspaper reported in 2002 that the deeds of the building had been given to the Libyan leader Muammar Gaddafi as surety for oil supplied to Zimbabwe by the Libyan state oil company Tamoil.
