= Chris Mann (poet) =

South African poet (1948–2021)

Christopher Michael Mann
- Born: 6 April 1948; Port Elizabeth, Cape Province, Union of South Africa
- Died: 10 March 2021 (aged 72); Grahamstown, Eastern Cape, South Africa
- Education: University of the Witwatersrand School of Oriental and African Studies Oxford University
- Relatives: Andrew Skeen (Rhodesia) (father in law) Michael Shipster (brother in law)
- Writing career
- Notable work: South Africans
- Notable awards: Newdigate prize MA work

Christopher Michael "Zithulele" Mann (6 April 1948 – 10 March 2021) was a South African poet, playwright, and academic who served as a professor of poetry at Rhodes University. He was known for his multilingual work and for founding Wordfest, a national festival celebrating South African languages and literature.

== Biography ==
Chris Mann was born in Port Elizabeth in 1948 and went to Diocesan College (Bishops) in Rondebosch, Cape Town. He studied English and Philosophy at the University of the Witwatersrand, and went to Oxford University as a Rhodes Scholar where he was awarded an MA in English Language and Literature. He also studied African Oral Literature at the School of Oriental and African Studies in London. From 1977 to 1980 he held a lecturer post in the English Department at Rhodes University in Grahamstown, South Africa. From 1980 to 1995 he worked with an NGO, The Valley Trust at KwaNyuswa outside Durban, where he received his isiZulu nickname, Zithulele, meaning "the quiet one." After that, after which he returned to Rhodes University where he was a professor of poetry at the Institute for the Study of English in Africa. He was founder and convenor of Wordfest, a national multilingual festival of South African languages and literature with a developmental emphasis. A native English speaker, Mann was also conversant in Afrikaans, isiZulu and isiXhosa. He performed his work at festivals, schools, churches, universities and conferences in South Africa. He was married to artist Julia Skeen.

== Works ==
=== Books ===
- First Poems, 1979. Cape Town: Bateleur Press.
- A New Book of South African Verse, 1979. With Guy Butler. Cape Town: OUP.
- New Shades. David Philip. 1982. ISBN 978-0-908396-54-2.
- Kites, and Other Poems. New Africa Books. 1990. ISBN 978-0-86486-151-1.
- Mann Alive!: Poems. David Philip. 1992. ISBN 978-0-86486-239-6.
- South Africans: a set of portrait-poems. University of Natal Press. 1996. ISBN 978-0-86980-922-8.
- The horn of plenty: a series of painting-poems. ISEA, Rhodes University. 1997. ISBN 978-0-86810-324-2. with Julia Skeen
- The Roman Centurion’s Good Friday, 1999. Grahamstown: Cathedral of St Michael & St George.
- Heartlands. University of Natal Press. 2002. ISBN 978-1-86914-010-6.
- In Praise of the Shades, 2003. Grahamstown: Cathedral of St Michael and St George.
- Walking on Gravity, 2004. Grahamstown: Cathedral of St Michael and St George.
- Thuthula, 2005. Johannesburg: Ravan & PanMacmillan.
- Beautiful Lofty Things, 2005. Grahamstown: Cathedral of St Michael and St George.
- Walking on Gravity, 2005. In: Dante in South Africa. Cullinan, Patrick and Watson, Stephen (Eds.). Cape Town: Centre for Creative Writing, University of Cape Town.
- Lifelines, 2006. With: Skeen, Julia and Craig, Adrian. Pietermaritzburg: UKZN Press.
- Home from Home: New and Selected Poems. Echoing Green Press. 2010. ISBN 978-0-9802501-7-6. with Julia Skeen
- Small Town Big Voice, 2012. Ed. Renard, Andrew. Port Elizabeth: SACEE.
- Rudiments of Grace, 2014. Grahamstown: Cathedral of St Michael and St George.
- Epiphanies, 2017. Grahamstown. Cathedral of St Michael and St George.
- Heraclitus in Africa. forthcoming.

=== Plays in verse and multimedia poetry productions ===
- The Sand Labyrinth. 1980 National Student Drama Festival.
- Mahoon’s Testimony. Broadcast on SAfm in 1998, rebroadcast 2007.
- Frail Care. Broadcast on SAfm in 1997 and re-broadcast in 1999 and 2007.
- The Crux of Being. 1999 National Arts Festival Fringe.
- In Praise of the Shades. 2003 National Arts Festival Fringe.
- Thuthula. 2003 National Arts Festival Main Programme.
- Walking on Gravity. 2004 National Arts Festival Fringe.
- Beautiful Lofty Things. 2005 National Arts Festival Fringe production.
- Lifelines. 2006 National Arts Festival Fringe poetry performance production.
- LifeSongs. 2007 National Arts Festival Fringe installation.
- Epiphanies. 2008. National Arts Festival Fringe installation.
- LifeSongs. 2011. National English Literary Museum installation.
- The Ballad of Dirk de Bruin, 2014. National Arts Festival Fringe.
- Anxiety and Grace. With Julia Skeen. 2016. National Arts Festival Fringe and Spiritfest.
- Epiphanies. With Julia Skeen. 2018. National Arts Festival Fringe and Spiritfest.

=== Articles ===
- "The Guttural Muse in the Sky: A valediction for Seamus Heaney". English Academy Review. 30 (2): 129–132. 2013. doi:10.1080/10131752.2013.843906. ISSN 1013-1752. S2CID 162267971.
- "Saturnalia satirica: six satires wearing masks". Scrutiny2. 19 (1): 147–151. 2014. doi:10.1080/18125441.2014.906257. ISSN 1812-5441. S2CID 144690149.
- "Creation and translation". Current Writing. 19: 21–52. 2007. doi:10.1080/1013929x.2007.9678260. S2CID 143802524. with Ileana Dimitriu
- "Seeing the cosmos in a grain of sand". Current Writing. 20 (2): 108–126. 2008. doi:10.1080/1013929x.2008.9678304. S2CID 145580265.
- "The Poetry of Belonging". English Literature. 2016. doi:10.14277/2420-823x/el-3-16-1.
- "Points of Illumination: Wordfest South Africa This Year and Next."

== Commentary on Mann's Work ==
Mann's work has received critical consideration in journals such as

- The English Academy Review;
- English in Africa;
- Shakespeare in Southern Africa;
- Scrutiny2; and
- Literator.

== Awards ==
- Newdigate Prize for Poetry while a Rhodes Scholar at Oxford.
- Olive Schreiner Prize for South African Poetry in English.
- South African Performing Arts Councils’ Playwright Award.
- Hon.D.Litt. University of Durban-Westville, now University of KwaZulu-Natal.
- Eastern Cape Premier’s Award for Literature.
- First Professor of Poetry, Rhodes University.
- English Academy of South Africa Thomas Pringle Award for Poetry.
- Mann's 2014 play The Ballad of Dirk de Bruin which premiered at the National Arts Festival was awarded a Silver Standard Bank Ovation Award for "artistic innovation, excellence and the exploration of new performance styles".
- Honorary Artist in Residence, Grahamstown Cathedral (2017–2021)
- Guest poet, Incroci di civiltà international poetry festival, Venice 2019
- English Academy of South Africa Gold Medal 2019
