= Diana Mitchell =

Zimbabwean political activist, historian and writer (1932–2016)

- Born: Diana Mary Coates; 16 November 1932; Salisbury, Southern Rhodesia
- Died: 8 January 2016 (aged 83); Haywards Heath, England, United Kingdom
- Education: University of Cape Town (BA); University of Rhodesia (MA)
- Occupations: Political activist, writer
- Spouse: Brian Mitchell (m. 1956; died 2010)

Diana Mary Mitchell (née Coates; 16 November 1932 – 8 January 2016) was a Zimbabwean political activist and writer, who was an outspoken critic of the governments of Ian Smith and Robert Mugabe.

== Biography ==
Mitchell was born in Salisbury, the capital of Southern Rhodesia. Her father, Elliott Coates, was a merchant navy officer and her mother, Mary Peck, from Australia, was an actress. Her parents' marriage ended in 1932, and she lived with foster parents during World War II while her mother worked in a munitions factory. She was educated at Eveline Girls High School in Bulawayo, and later at the University of Cape Town in South Africa, where she studied history and the Shona language. She married hydraulic engineer Brian Mitchell in 1956, and they had three children.

Mitchell's political activism began in 1966, when she campaigned to save a nursery school which was bulldozed by the government. The campaign later expanded to a broader one to improve education for black children. In 1968, she was involved with the Centre Party; although she ran as an independent candidate in the 1974 elections and for the National Unifying Force (NUF) in the 1977 elections.

After Smith's 1970 declaration of Rhodesia as a republic, Mitchell was involved with arranging negotiations between Smith's Rhodesian Front and militant nationalists. Working with journalists Robert Cary and Willie Musarurwa, she compiled and published a definitive biographical compilation of leaders in the nationalist movement, African Nationalist Leaders in Rhodesia: Who's Who. Although delighted at Zimbabwe's eventual independence under terms acceptable to the international community in 1980, Mitchell was critical of the Mugabe government's suppression of the media and political opposition. She and her husband moved to Britain in 2003. Brian died in 2010.

In 2011, Mitchell's extensive collection of political clippings and papers were donated to the Hoover Institution, which opened them for public access, and to the University of Cape Town.

== Bibliography ==
- Mitchell, Diana; Cary, Robert (1977). African Nationalist Leaders in Rhodesia: Who's Who. Bulawayo: Books of Rhodesia. ISBN 978-0-86920-152-7. OCLC 3500758.
- Mitchell, Diana (1980). African Nationalist Leaders in Zimbabwe: Who's Who 1980. Self-published. LCCN 88171163.
- Mitchell, Diana (1982). Who's Who, 1981-82: Nationalist Leaders in Zimbabwe. Rhodesia: Self-published. ISBN 978-0-7974-0497-7.
- Mitchell, Diana (1998). Josiah Mushore Chinamano. Longman Zimbabwe. ISBN 978-1-77903-145-7.
- Mitchell, Diana (29 January 2021). An African Memoir: White Woman, Black Nationalists: Diana Mitchell (Mwana Wevhu). UK: Independently published. ISBN 979-8-5998-8261-9. OCLC 1373309316.
