= Ronnie Sadomba =

Zimbabwean politician (born c. 1940)

Ronald Sadomba

Member of the House of Assembly of Rhodesia for Nemakonde & Harare
- In office 1977–1979
- Preceded by: Godfrey Chidyausiku
- Constituency: Harare
- In office 1970–1977
- Succeeded by: William Benjamin Chimpaka
- Constituency: Nemakonde

Personal details
- Born: c. 1940 (age 85–86) Southern Rhodesia
- Party: Centre Party (until 1972); African National Council (1972–75); Independent (1975–79); United African National Council (1979–81); ZANU–PF (1981–90s); United Parties (after 1990s)
- Occupation: Teacher; politician

Ronald Takawira Douglas Sadomba (born c. 1940) is a Zimbabwean politician and educator who served in the House of Assembly from 1970 to 1979. In 1979, he served in the Parliament of the short-lived Rhodesian successor state, Zimbabwe Rhodesia, prior to Zimbabwe's independence. He entered politics as a member of the Centre Party, and changed parties several times, joining throughout his career the African National Council, the United African National Council, ZANU–PF, and United Parties.

== Early life and career ==
Sadomba was born around 1940 in Southern Rhodesia. He attributed his political influence to some of his teachers in his youth. He was active in the youth wings of Zimbabwean African nationalist organizations. Before entering politics, Sadomba was a schoolteacher.

== Political career ==
In the 1970 election, Sadomba was elected to the House of Assembly for the Nemakonde constituency. He was one of seven black members elected from the Centre Party, a moderate, multiracial party opposed to the discriminatory policies of the governing Rhodesian Front. At the time of his election, Sadomba was the youngest Member of Parliament. Sadomba believed that no tribal chiefs should be in the Senate and that political power should devolve only through the elected senators.

In 1971, the issue of settlement proposals with the United Kingdom over Rhodesian independence became a point of discord within the Centre Party. The party's white leadership supported the Pearce Commission proposals, but the party's black members opposed it. Sadomba initially stayed in line with the party and supported the proposals, but changed his position after realizing he was an "obvious target" for blacks opposed to them. He resigned from the Centre Party in February 1972, explaining his reason by saying: "If by saying 'No' the African people are going to be united, then who am I go against this tide and cause the division which is responsible for our position today?" After leaving the Centre Party, he joined the newly formed African National Council, at one point becoming the party's Deputy Secretary for External Affairs.

In 1974, Sadomba was reelected to Parliament. In 1975, he left the ANC and became an independent. In 1977, he was elected to Parliament for the Harare constituency. By 1978, he was the leader of the black caucus in Parliament. In 1979, he joined the United African National Council, the party of Bishop Abel Muzorewa, the Prime Minister of Zimbabwe Rhodesia. He was elected to Parliament for Mashonaland West Province in the 1979 Zimbabwe Rhodesia general election. However, in the 1980 election right before Zimbabwe's independence, Sadomba lost his reelection campaign. In 1981, Sadomba left the UANC and joined ZANU–PF, the party of Robert Mugabe. In his letter of resignation from the party presented to Bishop Muzorewa (and a copy of which he gave to The Rhodesia Herald), he said that he could no longer continue to go against his conscience. He said it had been "a pleasure" working with UANC leadership but the time had come for him to leave.

In 2000, Sadomba ran as the United Parties candidate for the Seke constituency, but lost with only 0.5% of the vote.

== Personal life ==
Sadomba was described in 1971 as "a likeable man, a schoolteacher and a Methodist."

== Electoral history ==
1970 Rhodesian general election, Nemakonde constituency

- Ronald Sadomba (CP) – 281 (44.3%)
- Chad Magumise Chipunza (NPU) – 131 (20.6%)
- Herbert Munukwa Mano (Ind) – 87 (13.7%)
- Paul Harbinett Joseph Chanetsa (Ind) – 83 (13.1%)
- Eric Gwanzura (Ind) – 45 (7.1%)
- Simon Chibvawure Paraffin (RAP) – 8 (1.3%)

1974 Rhodesian general election, Nemakonde constituency

- Ronald Sadomba (Ind ANC) – 273 (83.0%)
- Stephen Amos Dzuka Chirenda (Ind) – 51 (15.5%)
- Mulena Mwana Sherena Mundawarara (APP) – 5 (1.5%)

'1977 Rhodesian general election', Harare constituency

- Ronald Sadomba (Ind) – 147 (57.6%)
- Tiriwanhu Mudzimu (Ind) – 83% (32.6%)
- David Munyamana (Ind) – 15 (5.9%)
- Milton Jack Makaya (Ind) – 10 (3.9%)

1979 Zimbabwe Rhodesia general election, Mashonaland West Province

- Ronald Sadomba (UANC) – (1 of 6 elected from 24 candidates through proportional representation system)

1980 Southern Rhodesian general election, Mashonaland West Province

- Ronald Sadomba (UANC) – (not elected; top 8 elected from 56 candidates through proportional representation system)

2000 Zimbabwean parliamentary election, Seke constituency

- Tumbare Mutasa (MDC) – 10,821 (45.8%)
- Phineas Chihota (ZANU–PF) – 9,236 (39.1%)
- Beta Zvanyanya Dongo (ZUD) – 2,047 (8.7%)
- Peter Mashumba (Ind MDC) – 703 (3.0%)
- Abraham Mombeshora (Ind MDC) – 388 (1.6%)
- Gerald Mubaira (Ind) – 320 (1.4%)
- Ronald Sadomba (UP) – 133 (0.5%)
