= 1996 Zimbabwean presidential election =

- 16–17 March 1996
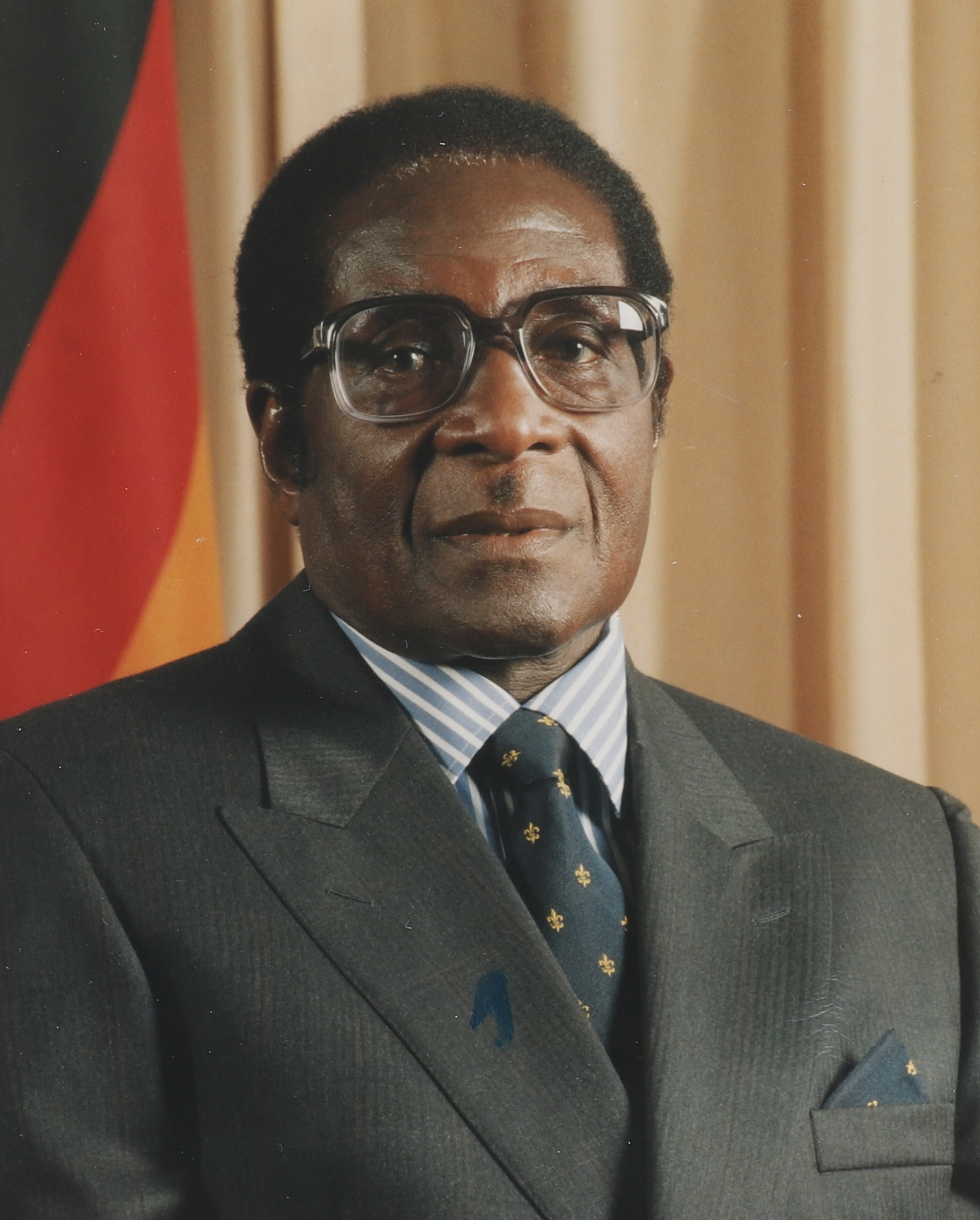

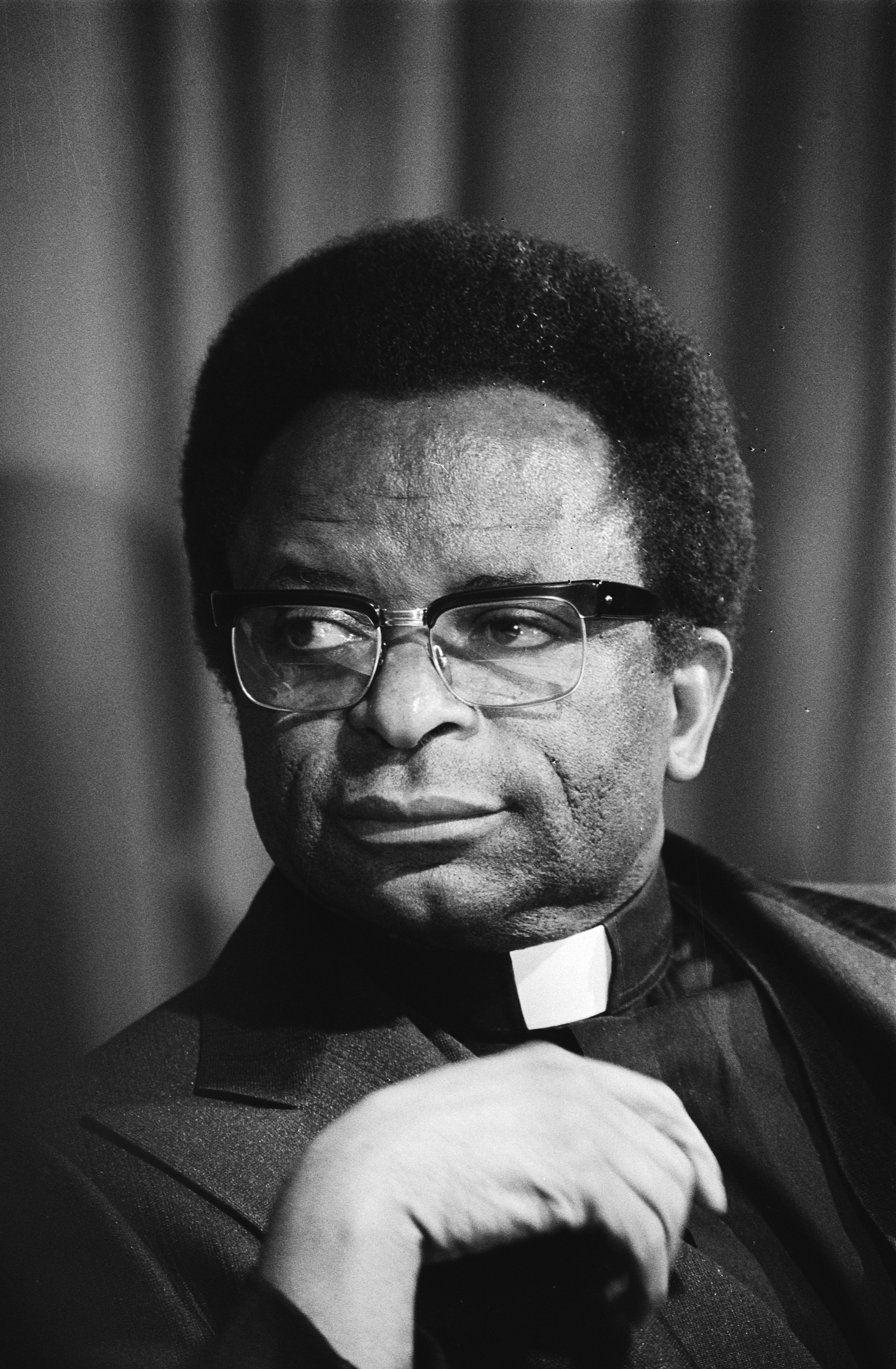
Candidate	Robert Mugabe	Abel Muzorewa
Party	ZANU–PF	United Parties
Popular vote	1,404,501	72,600
Percentage	92.76%	4.80%
President before election
Robert Mugabe
ZANU–PF
Elected President
Robert Mugabe
ZANU–PF

Presidential elections was held in Zimbabwe on 16 and 17 March 1996. The elections were contested by the incumbent President Robert Mugabe, Zimbabwe Rhodesia-era Prime Minister Abel Muzorewa, and ZANU–Ndonga leader Ndabaningi Sithole. Mugabe won, claiming over 90% of the vote, though turnout was just 32.3%, largely as a result of Sithole and Muzorewa withdrawing their candidacies shortly before the election (though their names remained on the ballot) due to threats of violence. Muzorewa and Sithole withdrew too late for their names to be removed from the ballot, so the election went on with all of Mugabe, Muzorewa, and Sithole as available candidates; in a state television broadcast, Mugabe urged Zimbabweans to vote anyway, possibly in an effort to make the election appear more legitimate.

The elections were not free and fair, as the ruling Mugabe regime and ZANU-PF party engaged in extensive electoral manipulation. The election took place amid an economic crisis. A perception among Zimbabweans that the election was merely a formality, even before Muzorewa and Sithole withdrew, contributed to low voter turnout.

Sithole (who was under virtual house arrest due to charges of attempting to assassinate Mugabe) withdrew after claiming that Mugabe's ZANU–PF was undermining his campaign, whilst Muzorewa pulled out after the Supreme Court turned down his bid to postpone the elections on the basis that the electoral rules were unfair (as state funds were only available to parties with 15 or more seats in parliament). In December 1997 Sithole was convicted of conspiring to assassinate Mugabe; he appealed but died whilst out on bail. He was 80 years of age.

== Results ==
Candidate	Party	Votes	%
Robert Mugabe	ZANU–PF	1,404,501	92.76
Abel Muzorewa	United Parties	72,600	4.80
Ndabaningi Sithole	ZANU–Ndonga	36,960	2.44
Total		1,514,061	100.00
Valid votes		1,514,061	97.21
Invalid/blank votes		43,497	2.79
Total votes		1,557,558	100.00
Registered voters/turnout		4,822,289	32.30
Source: African Elections database
