= Jack Pithey =

Rhodesian politician

The Honourable Jack Pithey GLM, ICD, CBE
- Jack William Pithey

Acting President of Rhodesia
- In office 1 November 1978 – 5 March 1979
- Prime Minister: Ian Smith
- Preceded by: Henry Everard
- Succeeded by: Henry Everard

President of the Senate of Rhodesia
- In office 1970 – 1 November 1978
- Preceded by: Office established
- Succeeded by: John Richard Strong

Personal details
- Born: 30 December 1903 Potchefstroom, Transvaal Colony (now North West Province, South Africa)
- Died: 20 November 1984 (aged 80)
- Party: Rhodesian Front
- Spouse: Mary Wood (m. 1931)
- Children: 3, including Tony and David
- Awards: Legion of Merit GLM Independence Commemorative Decoration ICD

Jack William Pithey GLM ICD CBE (30 December 1903 – 20 November 1984) was a Rhodesian politician who served as the unrecognised state's Acting President between 1 November 1978 and 5 March 1979. He was also the President of the Senate of Rhodesia from 1970 to 1978 having previously been Member of Parliament for the Avondale constituency in north-west Salisbury (now Harare) between 1964 and 1970.

== Biography ==
Jack Pithey was born in Potchefstroom in the Transvaal on 30 December 1903; he moved to Rhodesia on 5 September 1923. He was Secretary for Justice and Internal Affairs between 1958 and 1961 during the Federation of Rhodesia and Nyasaland, and later the Secretary for Justice in Rhodesia between 1962 and 1963. He was appointed Commander of the Order of the British Empire in the 1963 New Year Honours.

== Family ==
He married Mary Wood on 1 September 1931; they had two sons and a daughter. Both his sons, Tony and David Pithey, represented Rhodesia in cricket and played Test cricket for South Africa. He died on 20 November 1984, and his Rhodesian estate was subsequently liquidated.

== Awards ==
- Legion of Merit (Grand Officer - Civilian) (GLM)
- Independence Commemorative Decoration (ICD)
- Order of the British Empire (Commander) (CBE)

Political offices
Preceded by Henry Everard	Acting President of Rhodesia; 1978–1979	Succeeded by Henry Everard
