= Independence Commemorative Decoration =

Civil decoration of Rhodesia

- Type: civil decoration
- Awarded for: Those who rendered valuable services to Rhodesia up to 1979.
- Presented by: Rhodesia
- Post-nominals: ICD
- Status: No longer awarded
- Established: 23 September 1970
- Ribbon bar of the decoration

Precedence
- Next (higher): Independence Decoration
- Next (lower): Police Cross for Conspicuous Gallantry

The Independence Commemorative Decoration was a Rhodesian civil decoration awarded to persons who had rendered valuable service to Rhodesia. The award was instituted in 1970 by Presidential Warrant, the first awards being made the same year. Recipients were entitled to the post-nominal letters ICD.

The medal was a circular bronze medal worn on the breast. The obverse bore the shield from Rhodesia's coat of arms and the legend COMMEMORATION OF INDEPENDENCE RHODESIA, while the reverse was blank. The medal was impressed in small capitals with the recipient's name on the rim, and was awarded with a case of issue, miniature medal for wear, and an illuminated certificate. The ribbon consisted of five equal stripes, green, white, gold, white, green, identical to the Independence Decoration.

Over 150 awards of the Independence Commemorative Decoration were made between 1970 and 1978. Most recipients were political supporters or allies of the Rhodesian Front government of Ian Smith; the decoration was awarded to over 20 traditional leaders as a reward for their tacit support of the government. Recipients included the ZUPO leader Jeremiah Chirau, and the Rhodesian High Commissioner in London, Andrew Skeen.

The last recipient of the Independence Commemorative Decoration was the sanctions-buster Jack Malloch, owner of air transport company Affretair, in 1978. The Decoration fell into abeyance following Zimbabwe Rhodesia's adoption of majority rule in 1979, and the country's transformation into Zimbabwe a year later.

== Selected recipients ==
- Jeremiah Chirau
- Roger Hawkins
- Richard Hope Hall
- Jack Malloch
- Jack Pithey
- Andrew Skeen
- David Smith
- Rubidge Stumbles
- Archibald Wilson
