= Fergus Blackie =

Rhodesian jurist

Fergus Craig Blackie (18 July 1937 - 24 April 2021) was a former justice of the High Court of Zimbabwe. A former attorney (1963), advocate (1966) and senior counsel (1980).

== Background ==
He was born to Scottish parents in Harare and attended St George's College, Harare and Downside School. He briefly entered the monastery at Downside Abbey before going on to study law at University College, Oxford.

He began his judicial career in 1978 when he was appointed a Senior Judge of Water and Administrative Courts, culminating in an appointment to the bench of the High Court in 1986. He fell from power in 2002 after he successfully convicted then justice minister Patrick Chinamasa of contempt of court; after the trial, Chinamasa had Blackie arrested and charged with two counts of corruption. The charges were then dropped.

Blackie then moved to South Africa, where he worked in arbitration.

Blackie died in South Africa on 24 April 2021.
