= United Parties =

Political party in Zimbabwe

The United Parties (UP) was a political alliance founded in Zimbabwe in 1994 led by retired Bishop Abel Muzorewa. An amalgamation of Muzorewa's former party, the United African National Council, and a Matebeleland and Masvingo-based faction of the Forum Party which had been formed in 1993. For a short period, the UP also received members from the Zimbabwe Unity Movement, the party founded by former ZANU–PF secretary general Edgar Tekere in 1989.

The UP boycotted the 1995 elections and in 1996 Muzorewa withdrew from the presidential election charging widespread irregularities in the electoral law and administration. In the run-up to the 2000 election the UP called for Mugabe's resignation and an end to political intimidation.

The alliance signed a voting pact agreement with the Liberty Party, ZANU Ndonga and the Zimbabwe Union of Democrats with the aim of supporting the other party's candidate to avoid splitting votes.

== Electoral history ==
=== Presidential elections ===
Election	Party candidate	Votes	%	Result
1996	Abel Muzorewa	72,600	4.80%	Lost ✗
