= Rhodesian Action Party =

- Abbreviation: RAP
- President: Ian Sandeman (1977-1978); Ina Bursey (1978-1979)
- Founded: 5 July 1977
- Dissolved: 1979
- Split from: Rhodesian Front
- Ideology: White nationalism Anti-communism
- Political position: Far-right
- Slogan: Let's not settle for second best

The Rhodesian Action Party (RAP) was a political party in Rhodesia formed in 1977 by a group of MPs from the Rhodesian Front (RF) who were dissatisfied by the leadership of Ian Smith and his attempts to negotiate an 'internal settlement' with African nationalists. Twelve members of the Rhodesia House of Assembly joined the party when it was launched in May 1977, including Ted Sutton-Pryce, Reg Cowper, Ian Sandeman and former Rhodesian Front chairman Des Frost.

Accusing the RF of being "completely bankrupt of all ideas", the RAP endorsed "any constructive move towards a settlement of Rhodesia's constitutional problem", in which "people of different cultures can coexist in mutual respect and safety". It called for a three-tier federal government with separate ethnic representation and "the protection of the identities of the different racial communities". Frost described Smith as "tired and negative", prompting Smith to describe him as "completely two faced".

The defections did not end the RF majority in the Assembly but did deprive it of the two-thirds majority which was needed to amend the constitution and Smith therefore decided to hold an early general election to try to regain the initiative.

The party contested 46 out of the 50 white seats at the 1977 general election, with an advertising campaign defiantly proclaiming "if the rest of the world's settlement proposals for Rhodesia don't work - here are Rhodesia's settlement proposals for the rest of the world". It performed disastrously, failing to win any of the seats it contested, all of which were won or regained by the RF. The party's overall total was 9.3 per cent.

The party remained in existence and fought the Highlands North by-election in 1978 after the Internal Settlement agreement but did not improve its numbers significantly, with the opposition vote being divided between the party and its rivals, the Rhodesian Conservative Alliance and the reformist National Unifying Force, led by Allan Savory.

It campaigned for a "no" vote in the 1979 constitutional referendum, but was rebuked by South African Foreign Minister Pik Botha when it claimed that Pretoria would continue to support Rhodesia were voters to reject the power-sharing settlement. The president of the party, Ina Bursey, told supporters: "In using God's name I am not being irreverent, because if you vote Yes you will inevitably be landed with a Marxist government".

Bursey denounced the "yes" vote in the referendum, declaring: "The Rhodesian people have sold their souls to the devil and deserve to reap the fruits of the whirlwind." She announced that the party would be dissolved and that she would be emigrating from Rhodesia herself.

== Electoral history ==
=== House of Assembly elections ===
Year	Popular Vote	Percentage	Seats	Government
1977	6,224	9.26%	0 / 66	RF

== See also ==
- Herstigte Nasionale Party - splinter group of the South African National Party (1969-1989)
- Conservative Party - splinter group of the South African National Party (1982-1989)
