= Centre Party (Rhodesia) =

Political party in Rhodesia

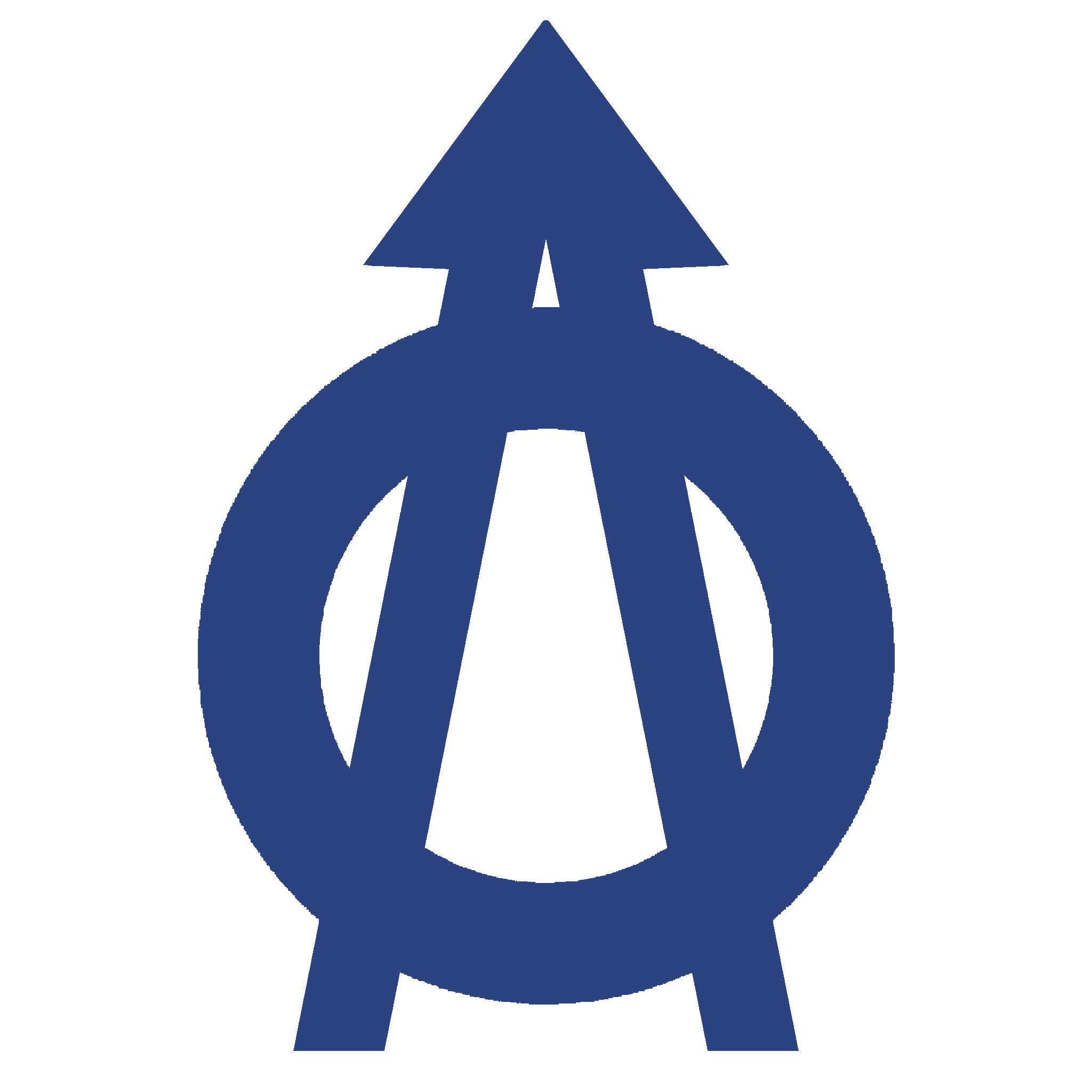
- Leader: Pat Bashford
- Deputy Leader: Charles Lazarus
- Founded: 28 August 1968; 57 years ago
- Dissolved: January 1977; 49 years ago
- Merger of: United Federal Party
- Succeeded by: National Unifying Force
- Headquarters: Salisbury, Rhodesia
- Ideology: Anti-racism; Liberalism
- Political position: Centre
- Colors: Blue

The Centre Party (CP) was a liberal political party in Rhodesia. Founded in 1968, it was a multiracial party opposed to the policies of the country's Rhodesian Front-dominated white minority government. It dissolved in 1977.

In 1968, a group of white Rhodesians, many of whom were associated with opposition leader Sir Edgar Whitehead, decided to reorganize. Led by Pat Bashford, they founded the Centre Party, a multiracial party opposed to Prime Minister Ian Smith's ruling Rhodesian Front. Its platform supported a non-racial franchise and elimination of racial discrimination. The party never gained any white seats in Parliament, but in 1970 seven black members were elected. The Centre Party's support for the 1972 Pearce Commission proposals eroded its support among blacks, many of whom left and joined the African National Council. In 1977, the party merged with the Rhodesia Party to form the National Unifying Force.

== History ==
=== Background ===
Following the dissolution of the Rhodesia Party and the United Federal Party, and the rise of the right-wing Rhodesian Front, Rhodesian moderates and liberals were a disorganized and uninfluential political minority. While forming an opposition was a topic of discussion among whites, it did not come to fruition until the founding of the Centre Party. Three years before the party's founding Rhodesia made its Unilateral Declaration of Independence (UDI) from the United Kingdom, and the country's unrecognized white minority government maintained power through strict requirements for voters that most blacks did not meet.

=== Founding ===
The Centre Party was founded on 28 August 1968 by a group of white Rhodesians seeking to recreate a viable opposition to the ruling Rhodesian Front. The new party was multiracial, and its initial platform supported universal franchise for blacks, the proposed Land Apportionment Act, and the elimination of blatant examples of racial discrimination. Pat Bashford, the Centre Party's founder and leader, was strongly opposed to UDI, Prime Minister Ian Smith, and Rhodesian Front's racial policies. Notable early members of the party included Nicholas McNally, future justice of the Supreme Court of Zimbabwe, Sam Putterill, former commander of the Rhodesian Security Forces, and activist Diana Mitchell, a co-founder who became the party's press and public relations officer.

=== Growth and 1970 elections ===
Later, the Rhodesian Constitutional Association, composed of former Rhodesia Party and United Federal Party members, merged into the Centre Party. At the party's inaugural congress, only 200 attended, while 450 attendees were expected. After receiving criticism for the congress's poor attendance, Bashford responded that he believed the Centre Party would be the future of liberalism in Rhodesia. However, the party remained small and was unable to garner significant white support, possibly because of the party's liberal image. In the period leading up the 1969 Rhodesian constitutional referendum, the Centre Party urged a "no" vote, believing that the new constitution would hurt the chance of reaching a settlement with the United Kingdom. In the run-up to the vote, the party had commissioned a professionally conducted public opinion survey, which found that the white population largely supported the new constitution, which would set up a republican form of government in Rhodesia.

Though the survey results showed that the Centre Party's position was not popular among voters, the party still decided to pursue seats in Parliament in the upcoming 1970 elections. In those elections, the Centre Party put up candidates for 16 of the 50 contested "European seats" (those reserved for whites), and ran candidates for all 8 of the "African", or black, seats. The party did not win any of the white constituencies, but drew on middle class black support and won 7 of the 8 black seats in Parliament, receiving the largest share of African roll votes. The Centre Party MPs elected in 1970 were: Edward Watunga (Harare), Lewis Ndhlovu (Insukamini), Lazarus Masenda (Mabvazuwa), Wening Moraka (Matojeni), Lwazi Mahlangu (Mpopoma), Ronnie Sadomba (Nemakonde), and Micah Bhebe (Ntshonalanga). By 1971, the party reached its peak support, with about 60 local branches in the black Tribal Trust Lands, not to mention branches in white areas. Ian Smith called it "the real opposition."

=== Settlement issue and decline ===
In 1971, the issue of settlement proposals with the United Kingdom became a point of discord within the Centre Party. The November 1971 issue of the party newspaper Centre-point devoted half its content to speculations by various writers on the prospects of a settlement. That year, Ian Smith asked Bashford for the Centre Party's support in appealing to the British government to implement the terms of his settlement proposal. Bashford refused, due to the Rhodesian Front's continued racism, and because black African support for the proposal was low. However, by 1972, the Centre Party officially supported the settlement proposals after the Pearce Commission. The party's position on settlement was unpopular with black members, most of whom became disillusioned and turned their support toward the newly formed African National Council (ANC). Soon, even black party leaders began defecting. The deputy secretary for external affairs for the ANC said:

"The Centre Party has no more African support. I was its general secretary and I should know. This party does not stand for Africans, but Europeans."

Some black Centre Party politicians tried to remain loyal, but faced violence from their fellow blacks, and were forced to back down. Percy Mkudu, a former MP and strong Central Party support, initially supported the settlement proposals but changed his position and began denouncing them after his businesses were attacked in January 1972. Ronnie Sadomba, a Centre Party MP, originally supported the proposals but resigned from the party in February 1972 when he realized he was an "obvious target". The Centre Party eventually abandoned support for the proposal, but had already lost most of its black support.

In the 1974 parliamentary elections, the Centre Party ran only five candidates, four of whom were black. Only one, Micah Bhebe, an African roll incumbent, retained his seat. Diana Mitchell, though a Centre Party supporter, ran (unsuccessfully) as an independent candidate, frustrated by perceived sexism in the party.

In January 1977, the Centre Party merged with the revived Rhodesia Party and the National Pledge Association to form the National Unifying Force as the country's main opposition.

== Ideology ==
The Centre Party was moderate and liberal. Its founder Pat Bashford remarked in 1969 that "liberalism needed a home in Rhodesia and the Centre Party could provide it." The party was multiracial and opposed to racist policies espoused by the Rhodesian Front.

=== Social policy ===
The party opposed white minority government in Rhodesia and racial discrimination, and supported equality before the law and improved education for black citizens.

=== Economic and land policy ===
The party supported private enterprise and restricting bureaucratic interference in the economy. They were opposed to the Land Tenure Act, which awarded a disproportionate amount of Rhodesia's land to the white minority over blacks. The party believed that within the Tribal Trust Lands, the authority of tribal chiefs in traditional matters should be respected.

== Structure ==
The party was headed by a leader, or president, Pat Bashford. Charles Lazarus was the deputy leader. From 1969 to 1976, an annual party congress was held. Bashford resigned in 1975.

The party published a monthly Centre Party Newsletter from January 1974 to June 1977. A party newspaper, Centre-point, was also published.

== Voter base ==
The Centre Party was a multiracial party, though its leadership and a disproportionate amount of its voter base were white. By 1971, the party had gained significant black support, with 60 local branches in black tribal areas. The Centre Party was strongest in urban areas. By 1972, the party lost much of its black support over the settlement proposal issue, and was left with mostly a white membership. The party never gained more than 3,000 members.
