= Roger Hawkins (politician) =

Rhodesian politician

Roger Hawkins GLM ICD
- Born: 25 April 1915; Letchworth, England
- Died: 3 March 1980 (aged 64); Selukwe, Zimbabwe-Rhodesia
- Education: Bedford Modern School
- Alma mater: King's College London
- Awards: Legion of Merit GLM Independence Commemorative Decoration ICD

Roger Tancred Robert Hawkins GLM ICD (25 April 1915 – 3 March 1980) was a Rhodesian politician and member of Ian Smith's cabinet in the years following Rhodesia's Unilateral Declaration of Independence. He was one of the founder members of the Rhodesian Front.

== Life ==
Roger Tancred Robert Hawkins was born in Letchworth, England on 25 April 1915. He was the son of Harry Bradford Tancred Hawkins and was educated at Bedford Modern School and King's College London.

At the outbreak of World War II, Hawkins served with the Rhodesian Forces in 1939 and received his commission in Cairo in 1940. He joined the 1st Battalion, Northern Rhodesia Regiment in 1941 and served in East Africa, Ceylon and Burma.

After the war, Hawkins pursued business interests and, before entering politics, was an acknowledged mining expert and owner in Selukwe where Ian Smith was also a prominent farmer. He was elected President of the Rhodesian Mining Federation, became increasingly involved in political affairs and was one of the founder members of the Rhodesian Front. Following the resignation of Clifford Dupont, Hawkins was elected to the Southern Rhodesian Legislative Assembly on 15 September 1964 as Member of Parliament for Charter.

In 1970, Hawkins was appointed Minister of Transport in Smith's Cabinet. He was sworn in on 13 April 1970. On 11 March 1977, at the height of the Rhodesian Bush War, Smith appointed him Minister of the newly created Ministry of Combined Operations. Hawkins also held the position of Minister of Defence.

Hawkins resigned from the Rhodesian Cabinet in November 1978 on the grounds of ill health. He died in Selukwe at the age of 64 on 3 March 1980.

== Awards ==
- Legion of Merit (Grand Officer - Civilian) (GLM) (Rhodesia)
- Independence Commemorative Decoration (ICD) (Rhodesia)

Southern Rhodesian Legislative Assembly
Preceded by Clifford Dupont	Member of Parliament for Charter; 1964 – 1970	Assembly dissolved
House of Assembly of Rhodesia
New constituency	Member of Parliament for Midlands; 1970 – 1974	Succeeded by Henry Swan Elsworth
Preceded by Desmond Lardner-Burke	Member of Parliament for Gwelo; 1974 – 1979	Assembly dissolved
Political offices
Preceded by Andrew Dunlop	Minister of Roads and Road Traffic; 1970 – 1977	Succeeded by Archibald Wilson
Preceded by John Wrathall	Minister of Posts; 1973 – 1977	Succeeded by Archibald Wilson
Preceded by Mark Partridge	Minister of Defence; 1977 – 1979; Served alongside: John Kadzviti (1978–79)	Rhodesia dissolved
New title	Minister of Combined Operations; 1977 – 1978; Served alongside: John Kadzviti (1978–78)	Succeeded by Hilary Squires
