= Signatories of Rhodesia's Unilateral Declaration of Independence =

The Unilateral Declaration of Independence of Rhodesia from the United Kingdom was signed by 12 ministers of the Rhodesian Cabinet, headed by Prime Minister Ian Smith, on 11 November 1965. Four junior members of the Cabinet—two ministers without portfolio, the chief whip and the deputy minister of information—did not sign, but were included in the official photograph.

== Signatories ==
The 12 signatories were:

Portrait	Signatory	Position
	Ian Smith	Prime Minister
	Clifford Dupont	Deputy Prime Minister; Minister of External Affairs; Minister of Defence
	The Duke of Montrose	Minister of Agriculture
	Jack Howman	Minister of Tourism; Minister of Information
	William Harper	Minister of Internal Affairs; Minister of Public Service
	Desmond Lardner-Burke	Minister of Justice and Law and Order
	Ian Finlay McLean	Minister of Health; Minister of Labour and Social Welfare
	Jack Mussett	Minister of Housing and Local Government
	George Rudland	Minister of Trade, Industry, and Development
	A. P. Smith	Minister of Education
	Phillip van Heerden	Minister of Mines, Lands, and Water Development
	John Wrathall	Minister of Finance Minister of Posts

Four junior members of the Cabinet did not sign, but were included in the official photograph:

Portrait	Signatory	Position
	Ian Dillon	Chief Government Whip
	Lance Smith	Minister without portfolio
	Andrew Dunlop	Minister without portfolio
	P. K. van der Byl	Deputy Minister of Information

== Notes and references ==
Bibliography

- White, Matthew C. (1978). Smith of Rhodesia: A Pictorial Biography. Cape Town: Don Nelson. ISBN 978-0909238360.
