= 1962 Southern Rhodesian general election =

- 14 December 1962

All 65 seats in the Legislative Assembly 33 seats needed for a majority
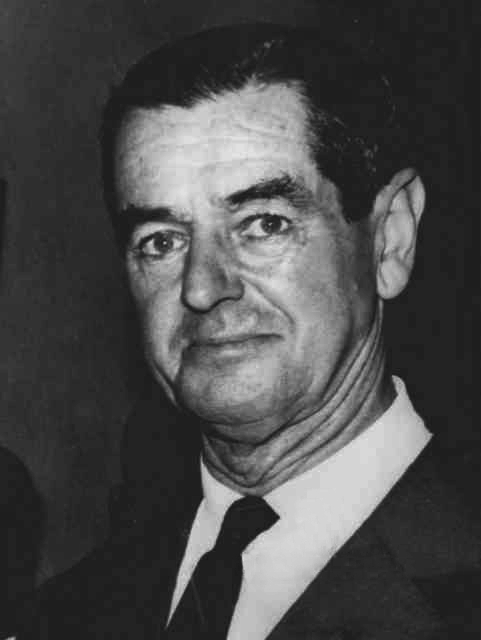

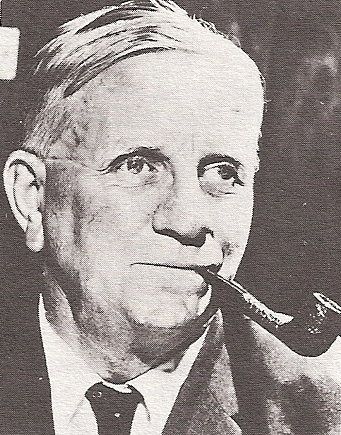
	First party	Second party
Leader	Winston Field	Edgar Whitehead
Party	RF	United Party
Last election	13	17
Seats won	35	29
Seat change	▲22	▲12
Prime Minister before election
Edgar Whitehead
United Party
Elected Prime Minister
Winston Field
RF

General elections were held in Southern Rhodesia on 14 December 1962 to elect 65 members of the Legislative Assembly. The election was notable for bringing to power the Rhodesian Front, initially under Winston Field, which set the colony on the course for its eventual Unilateral Declaration of Independence.

== Background ==
The election was the first held under the 1961 constitution which brought in a new electoral system. The chief issue in the elections was the future of the Federation of Rhodesia and Nyasaland, under which Southern Rhodesia formed a united country with Northern Rhodesia and Nyasaland, under the leadership of Sir Roy Welensky. The United Federal Party government of Sir Edgar Whitehead favoured continuation of the Federation in some form, together with moves towards multiracialism.

Opponents of the Federation had formed the Dominion Party but coming up to the election, the party had suffered division. The Rhodesia Reform Party had been formed by Ian Smith early in 1962 as a more moderate group. Dominion Party leader William Harper resigned in February 1962, stating that he intended this to be the catalyst towards the creation of a united opposition. By mid-March, the Dominion Party and the Rhodesia Reform Party had put together a broad plan for the new Rhodesian Front with Winston Field, from the Dominion Party, as its leader. Field had to call for unity at the first RF congress in September 1962.

== Electoral system ==
The electorate was divided into the 'A roll' and the 'B roll'. The 'A roll' consisted of people meeting certain income and property qualifications, which were lowered if the person had more extensive education. This in practice meant that 95.2% of those on the A roll were of European descent. The 'B roll' which consisted of those meeting a lesser income cap or a lesser property cap, both lowered for those with a longer education. 91.3% of those on the B roll were of African descent, although some Europeans only qualified for this roll. The figures were exaggerated by a largely successful campaign on behalf of black African nationalist leaders to persuade their supporters not to register to boycott the election. Most black Africans did not qualify for either roll anyway.

There were two different types of place returning members to the House of Assembly. The colony was divided into 50 constituencies each returning a single member, and in addition, there were 15 districts which also returned one member each. For the constituencies, voters from the 'A roll' and the 'B roll' could both vote, with their votes of equal value. Due to the fact that the 'A roll' was substantially larger than the 'B roll', these constituencies were almost entirely elected by Rhodesians of European descent. Theoretically, if the 'B roll' votes was more than a quarter of the total, they would be reduced in value to a quarter, but in practice this never happened due to the low enrollment and low turnout.

Both rolls also voted for the district seats. However, the total votes from the 'A roll' were reduced to equal a quarter of those of the 'B roll' voters. This meant that the district seats were largely elected by Africans.

== Campaign ==
There was a robust campaign, which all understood as leading to a watershed election. Political meetings saw a great deal of heckling. The RF was keen to reassure nervous voters that it supported some continued links with Northern Rhodesia, and campaigned for tougher enforcement of law and order and security. Both the UFP and the RF supported moves to independence but the RF was more keen, and stated that independence could be either within or without the Commonwealth.

The principal division was on race relations. The UFP leader Sir Edgar Whitehead pledged to appoint Southern Rhodesia's first African Minister should he be re-elected. The RF insisted that the UFP's moves were reckless and endangered Rhodesian society. They saw the 1961 constitution as opening the door to African dominance of Europeans "before the former has acquired adequate knowledge and experience of democratic government" and pointed to Kenya, where Europeans had been forced out of the country, as an example of what might happen. The UFP regarded the RF as reactionaries and throwbacks, and a UFP poster depicted a white man identified as an RF supporter with his head literally in the sand.

== Results ==
A win by the UFP was generally expected. The Examiner magazine said "Let no one doubt that the U.F.P. will win hands down; the Establishment always does in Southern Rhodesia." However, much to everyone's surprise (including their own), the RF found itself with a large majority of the Constituencies and an overall majority in the House of Assembly. The UFP took 14 out of 15 of the Districts, with one (Highfield) going to Dr Ahrn Palley as an Independent candidate. The UFP thus numbered 14 Africans out of a caucus of 29, but the party soon ceased to be a force in Rhodesian politics; from 1965 then until the end of minority rule in 1979 no opposition members were elected from the primarily European constituencies, Rhodesia thus would have a dominant party system.

Party	Constituency							District									Total seats	+/–
Party	A roll		B roll		Total			A roll		A roll devalued		B roll		Total			Total seats	+/–
Party	Votes	%	Votes	%	Votes	%	Seats	Votes	%	Votes	%	Votes	%	Votes	%	Seats	Total seats	+/–
Rhodesian Front	37,920	56.35	362	15.11	38,282	54.94	35	35,070	54.03	354	57.19	306	11.87	660	20.65	0	35	+22
United Federal Party	28,517	42.38	1,946	81.22	30,463	43.72	15	28,055	43.23	247	39.90	1,870	72.56	2,117	66.24	14	29	+12
Central Africa Party	75	0.11	29	1.21	104	0.15	0	1,764	2.72	10	1.62	359	13.93	369	11.55	0	0	New
Independents	776	1.15	59	2.46	835	1.20	0	15	0.02	8	1.29	42	1.63	50	1.56	1	1	+1
Total	67,288	100.00	2,396	100.00	69,684	100.00	50	64,904	100.00	619	100.00	2,577	100.00	3,196	100.00	15	65	+35
Valid votes					69,684	97.70								67,481	96.13			
Invalid votes					1,644	2.30								2,714	3.87			
Total votes					71,328	100.00								70,195	100.00			
Registered voters/turnout	90,785		10,632		101,417	70.33		90,785				10,632		101,417	69.21			
Source: Willson

=== By constituency ===
Constituency Electorate and turnout	Candidate	Party	A Roll	B Roll	Total	
Constituency Electorate and turnout	Candidate	Party	Votes	Votes	Votes	%
ARUNDEL; A 1,885 (81.6%); B 13 (38.5%)	†Blair Vincent Ewing	UFP	926	4	930	60.3
ARUNDEL; A 1,885 (81.6%); B 13 (38.5%)	Olive Hope Robertson	RF	612	1	613	39.7
AVONDALE; A 1,873 (77.0%); B 10 (40.0%)	†Albert Rubidge Washington Stumbles	RF	813	2	815	56.3
AVONDALE; A 1,873 (77.0%); B 10 (40.0%)	Ian Radcliffe Selmer	UFP	630	2	632	43.7
BELLEVUE; A 1,899 (81.0%); B 7 (28.6%)	Robert Patterson	RF	865	1	866	56.2
BELLEVUE; A 1,899 (81.0%); B 7 (28.6%)	John Gustav Haycraft Gasson	UFP	674	1	675	43.8
BELVEDERE; A 1,800 (77.4%); B 13 (69.2%)	Gordon Foster Thomas	UFP	736	8	744	53.0
BELVEDERE; A 1,800 (77.4%); B 13 (69.2%)	Dennis Divaris	RF	658	1	659	47.0
BORROWDALE; A 1,914 (78.7%); B 25 (48.0%)	†Peter Heaton Grey	UFP	977	9	986	64.9
BORROWDALE; A 1,914 (78.7%); B 25 (48.0%)	Thomas Ian Fraser Sandeman	RF	530	3	533	35.1
BRAESIDE; A 1,859 (78.5%); B 27 (44.4%)	Herbert Douglas Tanner	RF	931	4	935	63.6
BRAESIDE; A 1,859 (78.5%); B 27 (44.4%)	†Michael Eddington Currie	UFP	528	8	536	36.4
BULAWAYO CENTRAL; A 1,841 (68.1%); B 41 (63.4%)	†Benny Goldstein	UFP	628	22	650	50.8
BULAWAYO CENTRAL; A 1,841 (68.1%); B 41 (63.4%)	Norman Munro Campbell	RF	626	4	630	49.2
BULAWAYO DISTRICT; A 1,765 (70.4%); B 708 (19.6%)	Arthur Gale Langford	RF	692	10	702	50.8
BULAWAYO DISTRICT; A 1,765 (70.4%); B 708 (19.6%)	Bryan Roy Thompson	UFP	475	100	575	41.6
BULAWAYO DISTRICT; A 1,765 (70.4%); B 708 (19.6%)	Benjamin Baron	CAP	75	29	104	7.5
BULAWAYO EAST; A 1,932 (77.8%); B 17 (52.9%)	†Abraham Eliezer Abrahamson	UFP	1,057	7	1,064	70.4
BULAWAYO EAST; A 1,932 (77.8%); B 17 (52.9%)	Arthur McCarter	RF	446	2	448	29.6
BULAWAYO NORTH; A 1,810 (76.1%); B 30 (60.0%)	John Wrathall	RF	724	7	731	52.4
BULAWAYO NORTH; A 1,810 (76.1%); B 30 (60.0%)	†Cyril James Hatty	UFP	653	11	664	47.6
BULAWAYO SOUTH; A 1,895 (65.8%); B 45 (57.8%)	John William Phillips	RF	698	11	709	55.7
BULAWAYO SOUTH; A 1,895 (65.8%); B 45 (57.8%)	Robert Godlonton Hoole	UFP	549	15	564	44.3
CENTRAL; A 1,669 (73.2%); B 442 (18.8%)	†William Joseph John Cary	RF	874	13	887	68.0
CENTRAL; A 1,669 (73.2%); B 442 (18.8%)	Anthony John Arthur Peck	UFP	347	70	417	32.0
CHARTER; A 1,611 (71.1%); B 847 (17.1%)	Clifford Walter Dupont	RF	808	24	832	64.4
CHARTER; A 1,611 (71.1%); B 847 (17.1%)	Francis Seymour Brian Willoughby	UFP	338	121	459	35.6
EASTERN; A 1,884 (71.3%); B 508 (20.3%)	Alan James Wroughton MacLeod	RF	768	18	786	54.3
EASTERN; A 1,884 (71.3%); B 508 (20.3%)	Charles Fitzwilliam Clifford Verry Cadiz	UFP	576	85	661	45.7
GATOOMA; A 1,561 (72.3%); B 215 (25.6%)	†William John Harper	RF	784	5	789	66.6
GATOOMA; A 1,561 (72.3%); B 215 (25.6%)	Robert Norman Wells	UFP	345	50	395	33.4
GREENDALE; A 1,814 (76.8%); B 195 (7.7%)	Mark Partridge	RF	779	3	782	55.5
GREENDALE; A 1,814 (76.8%); B 195 (7.7%)	†Herbert Jack Quinton	UFP	615	12	627	44.5
GREENWOOD; A 1,869 (71.7%); B 9 (33.3%)	William Vernon Brelsford	UFP	716	1	717	53.4
GREENWOOD; A 1,869 (71.7%); B 9 (33.3%)	William Johnstone Jarvis	RF	532	-	532	39.6
GREENWOOD; A 1,869 (71.7%); B 9 (33.3%)	Ivor Pitch	Ind	92	2	94	7.0
GWEBI; A 1,823 (82.3%); B 254 (25.6%)	Lord James Angus Graham	RF	995	13	1,008	64.4
GWEBI; A 1,823 (82.3%); B 254 (25.6%)	John Derek Crozier	UFP	505	52	557	35.6
GWELO; A 1,697 (70.5%); B 26 (61.5%)	Desmond Lardner-Burke	RF	768	6	774	63.8
GWELO; A 1,697 (70.5%); B 26 (61.5%)	Eileen Doyle	UFP	429	10	439	36.2
GWELO RURAL; A 1,822 (73.2%); B 143 (18.2%)	†Charles Falcon Scott Clark	RF	938	4	942	69.3
GWELO RURAL; A 1,822 (73.2%); B 143 (18.2%)	John Douglas Downs	UFP	395	22	417	30.7
HARTLEY; A 1,551 (78.4%); B 338 (24.0%)	P. K. van der Byl	RF	814	7	821	63.3
HARTLEY; A 1,551 (78.4%); B 338 (24.0%)	Geoffrey Stanhope Courtney	UFP	402	74	476	36.7
HATFIELD; A 1,894 (77.7%); B 20 (20.0%)	John Gaunt	RF	991	4	995	67.4
HATFIELD; A 1,894 (77.7%); B 20 (20.0%)	†Stewart Edward Aitken-Cade	UFP	481	-	481	32.6
HIGHLANDS NORTH; A 1,760 (81.0%); B 10 (70.0%)	Geoffrey Ellman Brown	UFP	850	6	856	59.7
HIGHLANDS NORTH; A 1,760 (81.0%); B 10 (70.0%)	William Robert Rumbold	RF	576	1	577	40.3
HIGHLANDS SOUTH; A 1,749 (75.2%); B 17 (58.8%)	Alan David Butler	UFP	668	9	677	51.1
HIGHLANDS SOUTH; A 1,749 (75.2%); B 17 (58.8%)	Guy Openshaw Lister	RF	647	1	648	48.9
HILLCREST; A 1,906 (79.9%); B 9 (55.6%)	John Arthur Newington	RF	877	3	880	57.6
HILLCREST; A 1,906 (79.9%); B 9 (55.6%)	Michael Leib Ayl	UFP	646	2	648	42.4
HILLSIDE; A 1,840 (79.9%); B 8 (50.0%)	†Maureen Thelma Watson	UFP	819	3	822	55.7
HILLSIDE; A 1,840 (79.9%); B 8 (50.0%)	William Redpath Kinleyside	RF	652	1	653	44.3
JAMESON; A 1,805 (77.2%); B 18 (22.2%)	Jack Howman	RF	864	2	866	62.0
JAMESON; A 1,805 (77.2%); B 18 (22.2%)	Josiah Douglas Carter	UFP	493	1	494	35.3
JAMESON; A 1,805 (77.2%); B 18 (22.2%)	William Alfred Porter	Ind	37	1	38	2.7
LOMAGUNDI; A 2,041 (75.1%); B 327 (28.4%)	Lance Bales Smith	RF	990	13	1,003	61.7
LOMAGUNDI; A 2,041 (75.1%); B 327 (28.4%)	Robert Gordon Hoskins-Davies	UFP	542	80	622	38.3
MABELREIGN; A 1,866 (78.8%); B 11 (72.7%)	Patrick Palmer-Owen	RF	882	3	885	59.8
MABELREIGN; A 1,866 (78.8%); B 11 (72.7%)	William Daniel Gale	UFP	589	5	594	40.2
MARANDELLAS; A 1,676 (75.9%); B 354 (25.7%)	Winston Field	RF	746	9	755	55.4
MARANDELLAS; A 1,676 (75.9%); B 354 (25.7%)	John Peacey Dankwerts	UFP	526	82	608	44.6
MARLBOROUGH; A 1,786 (82.0%); B 14 (64.3%)	Harry Reedman	RF	938	-	938	63.6
MARLBOROUGH; A 1,786 (82.0%); B 14 (64.3%)	†John Desmond Burrows	UFP	527	9	536	36.4
MATOBO; A 1,777 (70.2%); B 361 (16.3%)	†Harry Roberts	RF	662	8	670	51.3
MATOBO; A 1,777 (70.2%); B 361 (16.3%)	Edward William Kirby	UFP	585	51	636	48.7
MAZOE; A 2,048 (79.0%); B 467 (27.0%)	George Rollo Hayman	RF	956	16	972	55.8
MAZOE; A 2,048 (79.0%); B 467 (27.0%)	Neil Patrick Hammond	UFP	661	110	771	44.2
MILTON PARK; A 1,851 (78.9%); B 14 (35.7%)	William Alexander Eustace Winterton	UFP	868	5	873	59.6
MILTON PARK; A 1,851 (78.9%); B 14 (35.7%)	Dorothy Patricia Cooper	RF	592	-	592	40.4
MTOKO; A 1,526 (76.3%); B 488 (24.0%)	George Roger John Hackwill	UFP	564	89	653	51.0
MTOKO; A 1,526 (76.3%); B 488 (24.0%)	Ronald William Rankine	RF	600	28	628	49.0
QUEEN'S PARK; A 2,054 (73.7%); B 18 (61.1%)	†Ian Finlay McLean	RF	1,147	10	1,157	75.9
QUEEN'S PARK; A 2,054 (73.7%); B 18 (61.1%)	Laurence Ayers	UFP	366	1	367	24.1
QUE QUE; A 1,751 (73.6%); B 114 (35.1%)	Andrew Dunlop	RF	718	5	723	54.4
QUE QUE; A 1,751 (73.6%); B 114 (35.1%)	†Morris Isaac Hirsch	UFP	571	35	606	45.6
RAYLTON; A 1,917 (74.1%); B 38 (47.4%)	†Thomas Alexander Pinchen	RF	851	1	852	59.2
RAYLTON; A 1,917 (74.1%); B 38 (47.4%)	Patrick Lennon	UFP	569	17	586	40.8
RUSAPE; A 1,729 (73.0%); B 580 (26.9%)	†Philip van Heerden	RF	962	19	981	69.2
RUSAPE; A 1,729 (73.0%); B 580 (26.9%)	Patrick Joseph Beary Power	UFP	300	137	437	30.8
SALISBURY CENTRAL; A 1,780 (67.2%); B 22 (63.6%)	Jeremiah Robert Ryan	RF	621	4	625	51.6
SALISBURY CENTRAL; A 1,780 (67.2%); B 22 (63.6%)	Ernest Jackson Whitaker	UFP	576	10	586	48.4
SALISBURY CITY; A 1,837 (60.7%); B 38 (44.7%)	John Roger Nicholson	UFP	619	12	631	55.7
SALISBURY CITY; A 1,837 (60.7%); B 38 (44.7%)	John Plagis	RF	496	5	501	44.3
SALISBURY NORTH; A 1,935 (76.6%); B 43 (79.1%)	†Sir Edgar Whitehead	UFP	871	31	902	59.5
SALISBURY NORTH; A 1,935 (76.6%); B 43 (79.1%)	Nicholas Cambitzis	RF	611	3	614	40.5
SHABANI; A 1,621 (66.7%); B 435 (14.7%)	†Ian Birt Harper Dillon	RF	756	11	767	66.0
SHABANI; A 1,621 (66.7%); B 435 (14.7%)	George Edward Moorcroft	UFP	317	39	356	31.0
SHABANI; A 1,621 (66.7%); B 435 (14.7%)	Ronald John Hayes Auret	Ind	9	14	23	2.0
UMTALI EAST; A 1,852 (71.8%); B 11 (100%)	Bernard Horace Musset	RF	805	6	811	60.5
UMTALI EAST; A 1,852 (71.8%); B 11 (100%)	Leslie Herbert Morris	UFP	525	5	530	39.5
UMTALI WEST; A 1,920 (65.1%); B 164 (25.0%)	John Christie	RF	744	8	752	58.2
UMTALI WEST; A 1,920 (65.1%); B 164 (25.0%)	Harold Owen Trouncer	UFP	506	33	539	41.8
UMZINGWANE; A 1,827 (70.1%); B 442 (15.6%)	Ian Smith	RF	797	6	803	59.5
UMZINGWANE; A 1,827 (70.1%); B 442 (15.6%)	Reginald Ephraim Sagar	UFP	483	63	546	40.5
VICTORIA; A 1,593 (69.4%); B 808 (30.1%)	George Holland Hartley	RF	722	23	745	55.3
VICTORIA; A 1,593 (69.4%); B 808 (30.1%)	Andrea Zographos	UFP	383	220	603	44.7
WANKIE; A 1,846 (68.5%); B 550 (20.4%)	George Wilburn Rudland	RF	754	14	768	55.8
WANKIE; A 1,846 (68.5%); B 550 (20.4%)	Basil Henry George Sparrow	UFP	511	98	609	44.2
WATERFALLS; A 1,946 (76.7%); B 59 (49.2%)	Arthur Philip Smith	RF	1,040	6	1,046	68.7
WATERFALLS; A 1,946 (76.7%); B 59 (49.2%)	Eric Peter Gardner	UFP	421	20	441	29.0
WATERFALLS; A 1,946 (76.7%); B 59 (49.2%)	Andrew John Lawson	Ind	32	3	35	2.3
WILLOWVALE; A 1,878 (56.1%); B 1,279 (11.0%)	Gerald Joseph Raftopoulos	UFP	477	89	566	47.4
WILLOWVALE; A 1,878 (56.1%); B 1,279 (11.0%)	Victor Patrick Odendaal	RF	451	13	464	38.9
WILLOWVALE; A 1,878 (56.1%); B 1,279 (11.0%)	Gaston Thomas Thornicroft	Ind	125	39	164	13.7
WILLOWVALE; A 1,878 (56.1%); B 1,279 (11.0%)	Second Count					
WILLOWVALE; A 1,878 (56.1%); B 1,279 (11.0%)	Gerald Joseph Raftopoulos	UFP	482	91	573	55.1
WILLOWVALE; A 1,878 (56.1%); B 1,279 (11.0%)	Victor Patrick Odendaal	RF	452	14	466	44.9

== District results ==
Constituency Electorate and turnout	Candidate	Party	A Roll		B Roll	Total	
Constituency Electorate and turnout	Candidate	Party	Votes	Devalued	Votes	Votes	%
BELINGWE; A 2,221 (62.9%); B 649 (22.0%)	Jotham Siyapela Hove	UFP	445	11	102	113	63.8
BELINGWE; A 2,221 (62.9%); B 649 (22.0%)	Samson John Mazibiso	CAP	86	2	31	33	18.6
BELINGWE; A 2,221 (62.9%); B 649 (22.0%)	Gijima Msindo	RF	866	21	10	31	17.5
BINDURA; A 18,664 (76.6%); B 644 (33.2%)	Paul Harbinett Joseph Chanetsa	UFP	7,633	28	166	194	73.2
BINDURA; A 18,664 (76.6%); B 644 (33.2%)	Aloys Tayengwa Chinyani	RF	6,132	22	17	39	14.7
BINDURA; A 18,664 (76.6%); B 644 (33.2%)	John William Horn	CAP	529	1	31	32	12.1
GOKWE; A 7,901 (70.3%); B 726 (27.1%)	Philip Elijah Chigogo	UFP	1,851	16	138	154	62.9
GOKWE; A 7,901 (70.3%); B 726 (27.1%)	Job Mahambi Kumalo	RF	3,568	31	26	57	23.3
GOKWE; A 7,901 (70.3%); B 726 (27.1%)	Herbert Joseph Thompson	CAP	133	1	33	34	13.9
HIGHFIELD; A 195 (19.0%); B 651 (13.2%)	†Ahrn Palley	Ind	15	8	42	50	47.6
HIGHFIELD; A 195 (19.0%); B 651 (13.2%)	Gahadzikwa Albert Chaza	UFP	19	10	36	46	43.8
HIGHFIELD; A 195 (19.0%); B 651 (13.2%)	Ralph Drew Palmer	CAP	2	1	7	8	7.6
HIGHFIELD; A 195 (19.0%); B 651 (13.2%)	Patrick Joseph Geoffrey	RF	1	-	1	1	1.0
HIGHFIELD; A 195 (19.0%); B 651 (13.2%)	Second count						
HIGHFIELD; A 195 (19.0%); B 651 (13.2%)	†Ahrn Palley	Ind	15	8	42	50	47.6
HIGHFIELD; A 195 (19.0%); B 651 (13.2%)	Gahadzikwa Albert Chaza	UFP	19	11	36	47	44.8
HIGHFIELD; A 195 (19.0%); B 651 (13.2%)	Ralph Drew Palmer	CAP	2	1	7	8	7.6
HIGHFIELD; A 195 (19.0%); B 651 (13.2%)	Third count						
HIGHFIELD; A 195 (19.0%); B 651 (13.2%)	†Ahrn Palley	Ind	15	8	42	50	52.1
HIGHFIELD; A 195 (19.0%); B 651 (13.2%)	Gahadzikwa Albert Chaza	UFP	19	10	36	46	47.9
HUNYANI; A 8,559 (74.5%); B 619 (23.4%)	Luke Mangarazi Kandengwa	UFP	2,138	12	87	99	55.0
HUNYANI; A 8,559 (74.5%); B 619 (23.4%)	Mathew Kwenda	RF	3,950	22	25	47	26.1
HUNYANI; A 8,559 (74.5%); B 619 (23.4%)	Anthony Whitehead Hodges	CAP	288	1	33	34	18.9
INYAZURA; A 2,002 (72.0%); B 757 (28.0%)	Ambrose Charles Majongwe	UFP	445	16	172	188	71.2
INYAZURA; A 2,002 (72.0%); B 757 (28.0%)	Titus Ndoro	RF	980	36	20	56	21.2
INYAZURA; A 2,002 (72.0%); B 757 (28.0%)	James Caleb Matsika	CAP	17	-	20	20	7.6
MAGONDI; A 3,619 (75.7%); B 808 (26.2%)	William Kawara	UFP	863	16	158	174	66.2
MAGONDI; A 3,619 (75.7%); B 808 (26.2%)	Elijah Mambo	RF	1,832	35	13	48	18.2
MAGONDI; A 3,619 (75.7%); B 808 (26.2%)	Eric Gwanzura	CAP	44	-	41	41	15.6
MAKABUSI; A 12,116 (66.7%); B 652 (23.0%)	Patrick John Daniel Rubatika	UFP	3,659	16	100	116	62.3
MAKABUSI; A 12,116 (66.7%); B 652 (23.0%)	Martin Geoffrey Edwards	RF	3,942	18	21	39	21.0
MAKABUSI; A 12,116 (66.7%); B 652 (23.0%)	Miles Anthony Pedder	CAP	476	2	29	31	16.7
MANGWENDI; A 2,929 (73.4%); B 665 (23.9%)	Titus John Hlazo	UFP	947	17	82	99	50.3
MANGWENDI; A 2,929 (73.4%); B 665 (23.9%)	Stephen Zachious Bwanya	RF	1,168	21	47	68	34.5
MANGWENDI; A 2,929 (73.4%); B 665 (23.9%)	Richard Chikosi	CAP	36	-	30	30	15.2
MANICALAND; A 5,656 (69.8%); B 683 (26.6%)	Percy Hudson M'kudu	UFP	1,626	18	118	136	60.2
MANICALAND; A 5,656 (69.8%); B 683 (26.6%)	Walter Dumisani Chawheta	RF	2,224	25	24	49	21.7
MANICALAND; A 5,656 (69.8%); B 683 (26.6%)	Ratilal Damodar Devchand	CAP	100	1	40	41	18.1
MATABELELAND NORTH; A 19,483 (71.4%); B 743 (30.4%)	Joel Msindo Behane	UFP	6,394	25	177	202	71.9
MATABELELAND NORTH; A 19,483 (71.4%); B 743 (30.4%)	Aaron Mapisa	RF	7,519	30	49	79	28.1
MATABELELAND SOUTH; A 3,604 (67.6%); B 803 (16.2%)	Julius Masola	UFP	1,051	13	120	133	82.6
MATABELELAND SOUTH; A 3,604 (67.6%); B 803 (16.2%)	Paul Zekare	RF	1,386	18	10	28	17.4
MPOPOMA; A 1,231 (64.9%); B 707 (20.7%)	Cephas Hlabangana	UFP	394	17	117	134	74.4
MPOPOMA; A 1,231 (64.9%); B 707 (20.7%)	Phibian Percy John Kadzutu	RF	40	1	22	23	12.8
MPOPOMA; A 1,231 (64.9%); B 707 (20.7%)	Dick Albert Masunda	CAP	365	16	7	23	12.8
NARIRA; A 1,012 (65.3%); B 717 (16.0%)	Ranches Chereni Makaya	UFP	153	6	83	89	62.7
NARIRA; A 1,012 (65.3%); B 717 (16.0%)	Isaac Hanzi Samuriwo	RF	500	21	15	36	25.3
NARIRA; A 1,012 (65.3%); B 717 (16.0%)	Daniel Jollow Renasu Masawi	CAP	8	-	17	17	12.0
NDANGA; A 1,593 (67.7%); B 808 (32.2%)	Josiah Gondo	UFP	437	26	214	240	74.1
NDANGA; A 1,593 (67.7%); B 808 (32.2%)	Lazarus Dembetembe	RF	637	38	21	59	18.2
NDANGA; A 1,593 (67.7%); B 808 (32.2%)	David Alphabet Tinago	CAP	5	-	25	25	7.7

== Byelections ==
=== Matobo ===
Harry Roberts died on 13 March 1963, which led to a byelection in Matobo on 23 May 1963.

Constituency Electorate and turnout	Candidate	Party	A Roll	B Roll	Total	
Constituency Electorate and turnout	Candidate	Party	Votes	Votes	Votes	%
MATOBO	Sherwood Alexander Wilmot	RF	825	2	827	59.8
MATOBO	Edward William Kirby	UFP	362	194	556	40.2

=== Arundel ===
Blair Ewing resigned from Parliament on 4 August 1964 for business reasons, leading to a byelection in the Arundel constituency on 1 October 1964. Sir Roy Welensky, former Prime Minister of the Federation of Rhodesia and Nyasaland, returned to politics in an attempt to regain the seat; prompted by this, the Rhodesian Front decided that a leading party member newly appointed as Deputy Prime Minister, Clifford Dupont, should give up his seat at Charter to oppose him. Sir Roy was unsuccessful, polling only 633 votes to 1,079 for Dupont.

=== Avondale ===
The appointment of A.R.W. Stumbles as Speaker of the Southern Rhodesian Parliament on 28 July 1964 led to his resignation on 1 August 1964. A byelection in his Avondale constituency was held on the same day as that at Arundel. Jack William Pithey, for the Rhodesian Front, won with 1,042 votes to 416 for Sidney Sawyer.

=== Charter ===
Following Clifford Dupont's resignation on 15 September 1964 to contest Arundel, Roger Tancred Robert Hawkins was elected unopposed on 6 November 1964, to follow him in his previous constituency.

=== Matabeleland South ===
Julius Masola died on 8 September 1964, leading to a byelection in the district of Matabeleland South on 26 November 1964. The result was:

Constituency Electorate and turnout	Candidate	Party	A Roll		B Roll	Total	
Constituency Electorate and turnout	Candidate	Party	Votes	Devalued	Votes	Votes	%
MATABELELAND SOUTH; A 3,834 (10.3%); B 871 (16.9%)	Ephraim Jiho Mhlanga	RP	317	29	71	100	54.9
MATABELELAND SOUTH; A 3,834 (10.3%); B 871 (16.9%)	Daniel Hilson Dube	Ind	76	6	76	82	45.1
