= Ministry of Health (Rhodesia) =

Ministry of Health of Rhodesia
- Coat of arms of Rhodesia

Department overview
- Formed: November 11, 1965; 60 years ago
- Dissolved: June 1, 1979; 47 years ago
- Headquarters: Salisbury, Salisbury Province

The Ministry of Health was a government ministry of Southern Rhodesia first established in 1948, with the establishment of the Federation of Rhodesia and Nyasaland the responsibility for health was a federal responsibility from 1954 to 1963. The ministry returned to Southern Rhodesia from 1963 with the end of the Federation and then Rhodesia from the country's self-proclaimed independence in 1965 to 1979, when the country transitioned from white minority rule to the multiracial democracy of Zimbabwe.

== List of ministers of health ==
| № | Name | Took office | Left office | Political party | Prime Minister | Title |
|---|---|---|---|---|---|---|
| 1 | Hugh Beadle | 23 April 1948 | 20 July 1950 | United Rhodesia Party | Sir Godfrey Huggins | Minister of Health and Education |
| 2 | William Winterton | 20 July 1950 | 8 March 1951 | United Rhodesia Party | Sir Godfrey Huggins | Minister of Health |
| 2 | Patrick Bissett Fletcher | 8 March 1951 | 7 September 1953 | United Rhodesia Party | Sir Godfrey Huggins | Minister of Health |
| 2 | Patrick Bissett Fletcher | 7 September 1953 | 5 February 1954 | United Federal Party | Garfield Todd | Minister of Health |
Public health responsibility of the Federation, 1954–1963 (see list)
| 3 | John Wrathall | 29 November 1963 | 14 April 1964 | Rhodesian Front | Winston Field | Minister of Health |
| 4 | Ian Finlay McLean | 14 April 1964 | 1966 | Rhodesian Front | Ian Smith | Minister of Health |
| 5 | Rowan Cronjé | 1966 | 1 June 1979 | Rhodesian Front | Ian Smith | Minister of Health |
| − | Gibson Magaramombe (co-minister) | 27 December 1978 | 1 June 1979 | Zimbabwe United People's Organisation | Ian Smith | Minister of Health |
