= Ministry of Justice (Rhodesia) =

Former ministry in Rhodesia

Ministry of Justice of Rhodesia
- Coat of arms of Rhodesia

Department overview
- Formed: 1 October 1923; 102 years ago
- Dissolved: 1 June 1979; 47 years ago
- Superseding Department: Ministry of Justice of Zimbabwe
- Headquarters: Salisbury

The Ministry of Justice was a cabinet ministry of the government of Rhodesia. It was responsible for overseeing the nation's laws, legal system and law enforcement.

The Ministry of Justice was established in 1923 during the colonial period of Southern Rhodesia. It retained the same structure when Rhodesia unilaterally declared independence in 1965. The Ministry was led by the Attorney General (until 1933) and the Minister of Justice (after 1932), who was appointed by Prime Minister. In 1979, Rhodesia became Zimbabwe Rhodesia as part of the Internal Settlement. In 1980 Zimbabwe gained its independence and the Ministry was succeeded by the Ministry of Justice of Zimbabwe.

== List of officeholders ==
=== Attorney General (1894–1923) ===
№	Name	Took office	Left office	Administrator
1	Andrew Duncan (Legal Adviser)	10 September 1894	3 January 1896	Leander Starr Jameson
2	Sir Thomas Scanlen (Legal Adviser)	3 January 1896	2 April 1896	Leander Starr Jameson
2	Sir Thomas Scanlen (Legal Adviser)	2 April 1896	5 December 1898	The Earl Grey
2	Sir Thomas Scanlen (Legal Adviser)	20 December 1898	9 August 1900	William Henry Milton
3	John Gilbert Kotzé	9 August 1900	7 April 1903	William Henry Milton
4	Clarkson Henry Tredgold	7 April 1903	1 November 1914	William Henry Milton
4	Clarkson Henry Tredgold	1 November 1914	5 January 1920	Sir Drummond Chaplin
5	James Donald Mackenzie	5 January 1920	1 October 1923	Sir Drummond Chaplin

=== Attorney General (1923–1933) ===
№	Name	Took office	Left office	Political party	Premier
6	Sir Robert Hudson	1 October 1923	2 September 1927	Rhodesia Party	Sir Charles Coghlan
6	Sir Robert Hudson	2 September 1927	5 July 1933	Rhodesia Party	Howard Moffat

=== Ministers of Justice (1933–1979) ===
№	Name	Took office	Left office	Political party	Prime Minister	Title
1	Sir Robert Hudson	5 July 1933	12 September 1933	Rhodesia Party	George Mitchell	Minister of Justice and Defence
2	Stephen O'Keeffe	12 September 1933	14 November 1934	Reform Party	Sir Godfrey Huggins	Minister of Justice
3	Vernon Arthur Lewis	24 August 1934	12 August 1936	United Rhodesia Party	Sir Godfrey Huggins	Minister of Justice and Defence
4	Robert Clarkson Tredgold	12 August 1936	1 March 1943	United Rhodesia Party	Sir Godfrey Huggins	Minister of Justice
5	Harry Bertin	1 March 1943	10 May 1946	United Rhodesia Party	Sir Godfrey Huggins	Minister of Justice
6	Hugh Beadle	10 May 1946	20 July 1950	United Rhodesia Party	Sir Godfrey Huggins	Minister of Justice
7	Julius Greenfield	20 July 1950	7 September 1953	United Rhodesia Party	Sir Godfrey Huggins	Minister of Justice and Internal Affairs
7	Julius Greenfield	7 September 1953	5 February 1954	United Federal Party	Garfield Todd	Minister of Justice
8	Garfield Todd	5 February 1954	26 November 1954	United Federal Party	Garfield Todd	Minister of Internal Affairs and Justice
10	Rubidge Stumbles	26 November 1954	17 January 1958	United Federal Party	Garfield Todd	Minister of Justice and Internal Affairs
11	Alan David Hutchinson Lloyd	17 January 1958	17 February 1958	United Federal Party	Garfield Todd	Minister of Justice and Internal Affairs
12	Reginald Knight	17 February 1958	24 September 1962	United Federal Party	Edgar Whitehead	Minister of Justice and Internal Affairs
–	Rubidge Stumbles	24 September 1962	16 November 1962	United Federal Party	Edgar Whitehead	Minister of Justice and Internal Affairs
–	Rubidge Stumbles	16 November 1962	17 December 1962	United Federal Party	Edgar Whitehead	Minister of Justice; Minister of Law and Order
13	Clifford Dupont	17 December 1962	14 April 1964	Rhodesian Front	Winston Field	Minister of Justice; Minister of Law and Order
13	Clifford Dupont	14 April 1964	23 June 1964	Rhodesian Front	Ian Smith	Minister of Justice; Minister of Law and Order
14	Desmond Lardner-Burke	23 June 1964	1976	Rhodesian Front	Ian Smith	Minister of Justice; Minister of Law and Order
15	Hilary Squires	1976	1 June 1979	Rhodesian Front	Ian Smith	Minister of Justice; Minister of Law and Order
−	Byron Hove (co-minister)	27 December 1978	1978	Zimbabwe African National Union	Ian Smith	Minister of Justice; Minister of Law and Order
−	Francis Zindonga (co-minister)	1978	1 June 1979	United African National Council	Ian Smith	Minister of Justice; Minister of Law and Order
