= United Conservative Party (disambiguation) =

The United Conservative Party is a political party in Alberta, Canada.

United Conservative Party may also refer to:

- United Conservative Party (Chile)
- United Conservative Party, a Rhodesian political party 1974–76 formed by William Harper

== Related topics ==
- Unionist Party (Canada)
  - National Liberal and Conservative Party
- Unite the Right (Canada)
