= William Harper (Rhodesian politician) =

Politician in Southern Rhodesia

Minister of Internal Affairs of Rhodesia
- In office 14 April 1964 – 4 July 1968
- Prime Minister: Ian Smith
- Preceded by: Jack Howman
- Succeeded by: Lance Smith

Minister of the Public Service
- In office 14 April 1964 – 4 July 1968
- Prime Minister: Ian Smith
- Preceded by: Winston Field
- Succeeded by: Jack Howman

Minister of Irrigation
- In office 17 December 1962 – 15 February 1963
- Prime Minister: Winston Field
- Preceded by: Geoffrey Ellman-Brown
- Succeeded by: Himself (Water Development)

Minister of Water Development
- In office 15 February 1963 – 14 April 1964
- Prime Minister: Winston Field
- Preceded by: New title
- Succeeded by: Philip van Heerden

Minister of Roads and Road Traffic
- In office 17 December 1962 – 14 April 1964
- Prime Minister: Winston Field
- Preceded by: Geoffrey Ellman-Brown
- Succeeded by: Harry Reedman (Roads)

Minister of Transport and Power
- In office 29 November 1963 – 14 April 1964
- Prime Minister: Winston Field
- Preceded by: Leslie Cullinan
- Succeeded by: George Rudland

Member of the Southern Rhodesian Legislative Assembly for Gatooma
- In office 5 June 1958 – 11 July 1968
- Preceded by: Max Buchan
- Succeeded by: George Munro

Personal details
- Born: William John Harper; 22 July 1916 Calcutta, British India
- Died: 8 September 2006 (aged 90)
- Party: Dominion (1958–62); Rhodesian Front (1962–68); United Conservative (1974–76)
- Spouse: Elizabeth

Military service
- Allegiance: United Kingdom
- Branch/service: Royal Air Force; Royal Australian Air Force
- Years of service: 1937–49
- Rank: Wing Commander
- Battles/wars: Second World War

William John Harper (22 July 1916 – 8 September 2006) was a politician, general contractor and Royal Air Force fighter pilot who served as a Cabinet minister in Rhodesia (or Southern Rhodesia) from 1962 to 1968, and signed that country's Unilateral Declaration of Independence (UDI) from Britain in 1965. Born into a prominent Anglo-Indian merchant family in Calcutta, Harper was educated in India and England and joined the RAF in 1937. He served as an officer throughout the Second World War and saw action as one of "The Few" in the Battle of Britain, during which he was wounded in action. Appalled by Britain's granting of independence to India in 1947, he emigrated to Rhodesia on retiring from the Air Force two years later.

Harper contended that British rule in the subcontinent should never have ended and took a similar stance regarding his adopted homeland, reportedly declaring that it, South Africa, and the neighbouring Portuguese territories would "be under white rule forever". He entered politics with the Dominion Party in 1958 and became Minister of Irrigation, Roads and Road Traffic in the Rhodesian Front (RF) government in 1962. The head of a far-right group within the RF, he called for Rhodesia to abolish black representation in parliament and adopt "a form of political apartheid". When the Prime Minister Winston Field resigned in 1964, Harper was a front-runner to succeed him, but lost out to Ian Smith, who moved him to the Ministry of Internal Affairs.

Each breakdown or setback during the early years of Smith's premiership prompted press speculation that Harper might replace him. In 1966, when Smith brought a working document back from the HMS Tiger talks with the British Prime Minister Harold Wilson, Harper led opposition to the terms in Cabinet, contributing to their rejection. Harper resigned from the Rhodesian Front in 1968, soon after Smith dismissed him from the Cabinet, reportedly because Harper had had an extramarital affair with a British agent. He subsequently became a vocal critic of the Prime Minister, greeting each step Smith made towards settlement with black nationalists during the Bush War with public indignation. By the time black majority rule began in Zimbabwe Rhodesia in 1979, following the Internal Settlement of the previous year, Harper had left for South Africa, being unwilling to accept majority rule in Rhodesia. He died in 2006 at the age of 90.

== Early life ==
William John Harper was born on 22 July 1916 in Calcutta, British India, scion of an old and prominent Anglo-Indian merchant family that had been based in the subcontinent for generations, working with the East India Company during the 18th and 19th centuries. He was educated at North Point in Darjeeling, India, and in the English town of Windsor. He grew into a short but tough man who spoke with clipped diction. Nathan Shamuyarira wrote of him in 1966 that "his tight mouth rarely relaxes into a smile, so ... he seems always on the point of losing his temper".

== Military service during the Second World War ==
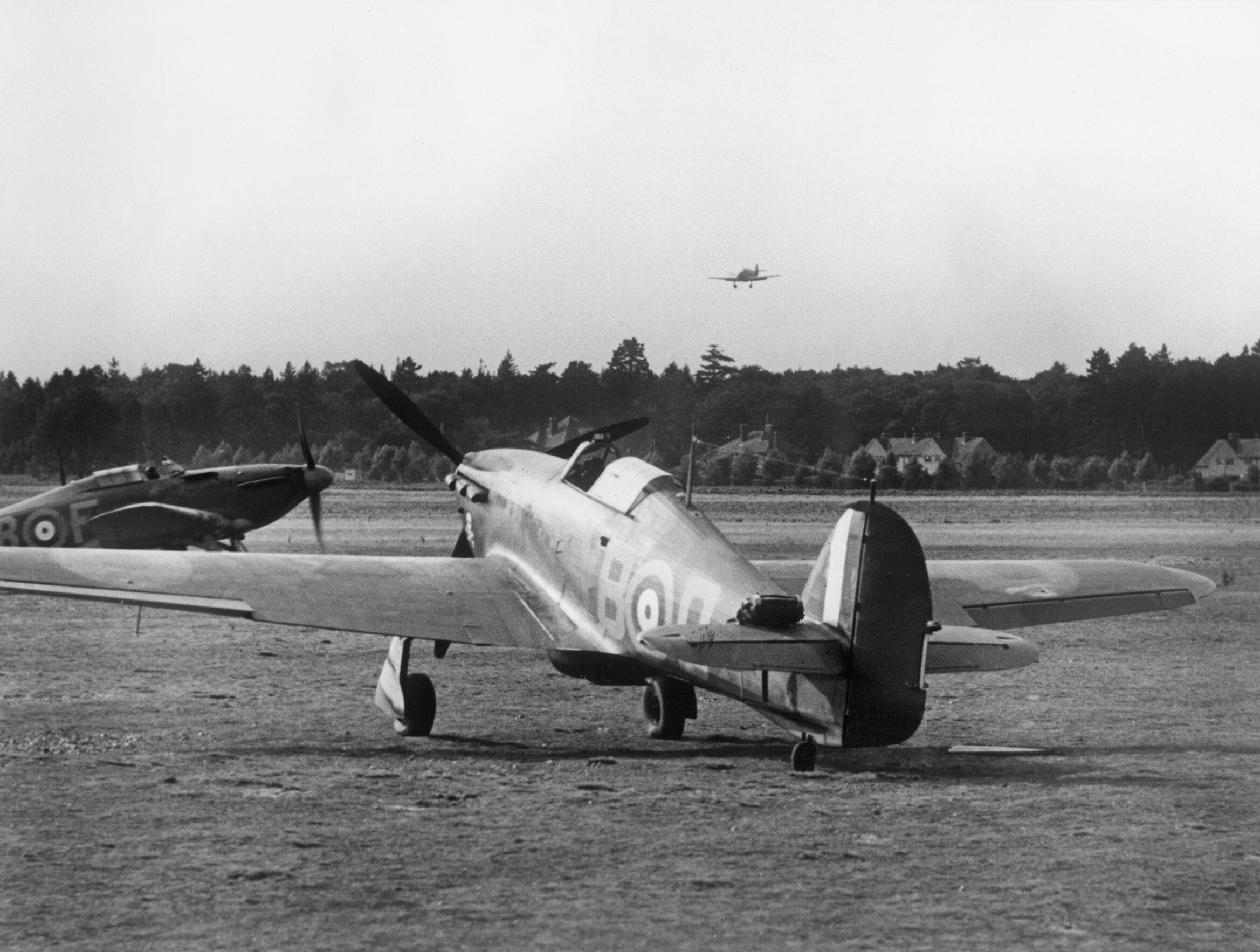
A Hawker Hurricane of Harper's unit, No. 17 Squadron RAF, during the Battle of Britain

Harper joined the Royal Air Force (RAF) in 1937, and was commissioned as an acting pilot officer on 5 September. He was promoted to flying officer on 12 February 1940, and attached to No. 17 Squadron. On 18 May 1940 he shared in the destruction of a Messerschmitt Bf 110 heavy fighter, and a week later he destroyed a Ju 87 "Stuka" dive bomber. He was appointed B Flight commander, with the rank of acting flight lieutenant, on 26 May. He destroyed another Bf 110 over Dunkirk three days later, during the evacuation of Allied forces, and continued as flight commander until 8 June 1940, reverting to the rank of flying officer. He was again promoted to acting flight lieutenant on 4 July, when he was given command of A Flight.

From July 1940, still flying with No. 17 Squadron, Harper was one of "The Few", the Allied pilots of the Battle of Britain. On 11 August he shared in the probable destruction of a Bf 110 and damaged a Messerschmitt Bf 109 fighter. Four days later, after taking off as part of a group of six Hawker Hurricanes assigned to intercept more than 20 Luftwaffe aircraft, Harper contacted the German planes alone and probably destroyed a Bf 109 before being shot down. He crash-landed in a field near the Suffolk seaside town of Felixstowe, and convalesced in hospital there with wounds to his face and leg. He soon rejoined No. 17 Squadron and continued his command of A Flight from the ground—he returned to the skies on 1 November 1940. A week later he destroyed a Ju 87 and probably another. Harper received the war substantive rank of flight lieutenant on 12 February 1941. A month later he was posted to No. 57 Operational Training Unit RAF, based at RAF Hawarden in Wales, as an instructor.

In September 1941, Harper was seconded to the Royal Australian Air Force (RAAF) to command No. 453 Squadron RAAF, which was based at Singapore and operated Brewster Buffalo fighters. After suffering heavy losses during the Malayan campaign in December, No. 453 Squadron was temporarily amalgamated with another Buffalo unit, No. 21 Squadron RAAF, to form No. 21/453 Squadron under Harper's command. By February 1942, No. 453 Squadron was denuded of aircraft and its remaining personnel were evacuated to Australia. Harper assumed command of No. 135 Squadron RAF in India in April 1942. In January 1943 he took command of No. 92 (East India) Squadron RAF in North Africa, and was promoted to temporary squadron leader with seniority backdated to March 1942. He was transferred to England in September 1943 and commanded the University Air Squadron at Leeds until 1944. He remained with the RAF following the end of hostilities.

== Political career ==
=== Emigration to Rhodesia ===
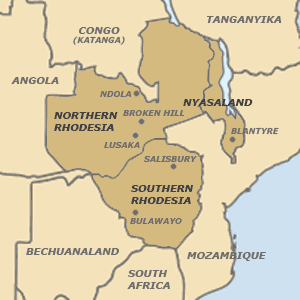
The Federation of Rhodesia and Nyasaland (1953–63)

Harper was appalled when Britain made India independent in 1947—he held that the British government had unnecessarily caved in to Indian nationalist demands and should have continued in the subcontinent indefinitely. He retained this view for years afterwards. He retired from the RAF in April 1949 with the rank of wing commander, and the same year emigrated to Southern Rhodesia, a territory of the British Commonwealth in southern Africa that had been self-governing since 1923. He settled in the central town of Gatooma, where he farmed, mined and set up an earth-moving contractor's business. In 1953, Southern Rhodesia became a territory of the Federation of Rhodesia and Nyasaland alongside Northern Rhodesia and Nyasaland. Each territory retained its own political status and government, and Southern Rhodesia's constitutional status was unaltered.

=== Dominion Party ===
Harper entered politics when he contested the Gatooma seat in the 1958 general election, running for the opposition Dominion Party (which called for full "dominion" or Commonwealth realm status). The Southern Rhodesian electoral system allowed only those who met certain financial and educational qualifications to vote—the criteria were applied equally regardless of race, but since most black citizens did not meet the set standards, the electoral roll and colonial Legislative Assembly were overwhelmingly drawn from the white minority (about 5% of the population). Harper won in Gatooma with 717 out of 1,300 votes. Holding strongly conservative views, he soon became seen as the voice of the party's right wing. He was elected president of the Dominion Party's Southern Rhodesian arm in October 1959, and by 1960 he was the official Leader of the Opposition in the Southern Rhodesian parliament.

Amid decolonisation and the Wind of Change, the Federation was looking ever more tenuous and the idea of "no independence before majority rule" was gaining considerable ground in British political circles. Harper believed that indigenous Africans were uncivilized and that whites should rule Rhodesia forever. He called for Southern Rhodesia to abandon the Federation and "go it alone". In June 1960 he and the Southern Rhodesian branch of the Dominion Party adopted the policy of "Southern Rhodesia first", prompting strong protests from the party's Northern Rhodesian division; the Dominion Party splintered into separate Federal and territorial entities a month later. When black nationalist riots broke out in the townships in October 1960, Harper condemned the Southern Rhodesian Prime Minister Sir Edgar Whitehead and the governing United Federal Party (UFP) as too lenient on the protesters, and argued that giving concessions following political violence would make black Rhodesians believe that "trouble pays dividends". Arguing against black representation in the Legislative Assembly, he said that if there were black MPs "they will share the restaurant with us and they will share the bars with us. We will be living cheek by jowl with them, and what sort of legislation can the people of this country expect when we ourselves are being conditioned to living cheek by jowl with Africans?"

=== Rhodesian Front ===
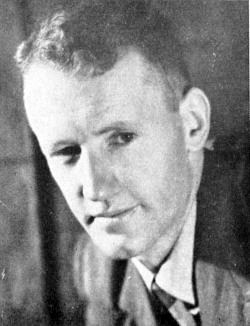
Ian Smith became Prime Minister in 1964. Harper was touted by pressmen as a possible replacement for the next four years.

In 1962 Harper was a founding member of the Rhodesian Front (RF), an alliance of conservative voices centred around the former Dominion Party and defectors from the UFP. The party's declared goal was independence for Southern Rhodesia without radical constitutional change and without any set timetable for the introduction of majority rule. After the RF won a surprise victory in the November 1962 general election—Harper comfortably retained his seat in Gatooma, and elsewhere the country's first black MPs were elected—the new Prime Minister Winston Field made him Minister of Irrigation, Roads and Road Traffic in the new government. Over the next few years, Harper became one of the main agitators in the Cabinet for a unilateral declaration of independence (UDI); equating Southern Rhodesia to India, he saw this as a way to prevent a repeat of "the same mistake".

The RF grew dissatisfied with Field during late 1963 and early 1964 because of his failure to win independence on Federal dissolution at the end of 1963. Northern Rhodesia and Nyasaland, by contrast, were both independent under black majority governments within a year, respectively renamed Zambia and Malawi. Harper, who had been assigned the additional portfolios of Transport and Power in November 1963, was one of two frontrunners to replace Field. The other was the Deputy Prime Minister Ian Smith, formerly of the UFP, who was also Minister of the Treasury. Harper, described in The Spectator as "an ambitious politician and single-minded upholder of white supremacy", was generally considered the more hardline choice, and the man more likely to go through with UDI. When the Cabinet forced Field to resign in April 1964, it was Smith who was nominated by the ministers to become the new Prime Minister. Accepting the premiership, Smith reshuffled the Cabinet a few days later and moved Harper to the Ministry of Internal Affairs. Harper was deeply disappointed not to have succeeded Field.

As Minister of Internal Affairs, Harper oversaw the indaba (conference) of chiefs and headmen at Domboshawa in October 1964, at the end of which the tribal leaders unanimously announced their support for the government's line on independence. He continued to be linked with the premiership. During Smith's negotiations with the British government, each breakdown or setback was accompanied by speculation in Rhodesia ("Southern" was dropped in late 1964) that Harper might step up to take his place. As the dispute with Britain intensified and white Rhodesians clamoured for independence, Harry Franklin reported in The Spectator in August 1965 that if Smith proved unwilling to go through with UDI, "it is widely believed that ... Harper will emerge from the wings, no longer an understudy, to dare what Mr Smith dare not." Harper was one of four ministers chosen by Smith to accompany him to London for talks in October 1965, the others being John Wrathall (Finance), Desmond Lardner-Burke (Justice) and the Deputy Minister of Information P K van der Byl. Agreement was not reached and a month later, on 11 November 1965, Smith and his Cabinet declared Rhodesia independent.

At the time of UDI, Harper reportedly kept a map of southern Africa on the wall of his office, on which he had coloured South Africa, South-West Africa, Rhodesia, Mozambique south of the Zambezi and Angola red; he told visitors that "the red area will be under white rule forever." While insisting that Rhodesia would continue regardless of international opinion, he publicly demonised the UK government, describing it in January 1966 as "an enemy ... [that] must be brought down". He also vilified black nationalist guerrilla fighters opposed to the Rhodesian government, calling them "gangs of terrorists" and "criminals". Comments such as these helped to cement Harper's reputation as a hardline right-winger and rival to Smith's leadership. The strong personalities of Harper and other ministers such as the Duke of Montrose (generally known in Rhodesia by his former title Lord Graham) were perceived by the British Prime Minister Harold Wilson and his compatriots as a great influence on Smith's political decision-making, an opinion also expressed by Harper himself.

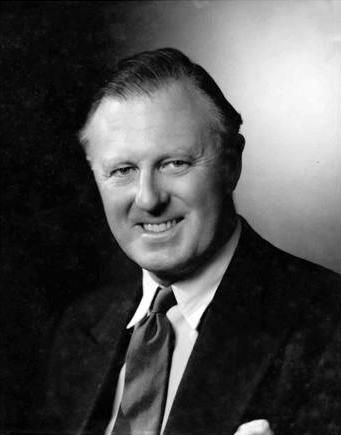
The Duke of Montrose (Lord Graham), one of Harper's main allies in Cabinet

Although Harper was considered an intelligent and capable minister by peers and reporters—a 1965 report in The Economist called him "by far the best brain" in the Rhodesian Cabinet—his views were often perceived as overly reactionary. He led a phalanx of far-right voices within the RF calling for "a form of political apartheid" in Rhodesia, and while the party line was gradual advancement of black political representation, Harper called not only for the cessation of such moves, but for the abolition of black MPs altogether. He thus became something of an obstacle to an Anglo-Rhodesian settlement. When Smith brought a working document back from the HMS Tiger talks with Wilson in October 1966, Harper led opposition to the terms in the Cabinet, contributing to its ultimate rejection. Harper considered himself to have been overlooked when Smith gave the office of Deputy Prime Minister (which had been vacant since UDI) to the more moderate Wrathall the month before the Tiger conference. The South African newspaper Die Beeld reported in December 1966 that the RF's right wing was poised to oust Smith in favour of Harper, but this did not occur.

=== Resignation ===
On 4 July 1968, Harper resigned from the Cabinet at Smith's request. He was the first minister to be dismissed during Smith's premiership. The government released a statement explaining that Harper had been removed "for reasons entirely unrelated to differences of opinion over constitutional or other political issues", and saying simply that Harper had been deemed "a security risk". Harper publicly claimed that he had been fired for political reasons and because of the threat he posed to Smith's leadership. Smith was reticent but told reporters he was prepared to tell "the whole sorry tale" if Harper wished.

According to the memoirs of Ken Flower, then the director of Rhodesia's Central Intelligence Organisation (CIO), Harper's downfall was the result of an extramarital affair with a young secretary in the Rhodesian civil service who the CIO discovered was an agent for MI6. Flower informed Smith of this on 3 July and the Prime Minister demanded Harper's resignation that afternoon; Harper acquiesced the next day. Because this was kept secret (presuming it is true), Harper's sudden departure from the Cabinet was interpreted by many observers at the time as the culmination of the personal and political rivalry between Smith and Harper, or the result of disagreements over the new constitution.

Harper officially resigned his parliament seat and left the Rhodesian Front on 11 July 1968. Wilson publicly welcomed his departure as a "step in the right direction", prompting a retort from Smith that he did not appoint or sack ministers to please the British government. Smith said that Harper had been depicted as more extreme than he really was, and denied that he had obstructed a settlement. In retrospect, Smith said he had been glad to be rid of Harper, who he considered underhand and devious. Harper ignored an approach from the ultra-right-wing Rhodesian National Party, offering the leadership, and for a time withdrew from public affairs. Montrose and the ministers Arthur Phillip Smith and Phillip van Heerden briefly threatened to follow Harper out of the government, but backed down within a few days. After a fresh dispute Montrose resigned on 11 September 1968 in protest against Smith's proposed constitutional and racial policies, which he deemed too liberal. A week later the RF's Albert Mells easily won the by-election to fill Harper's former seat in Gatooma.

=== Later career ===
By the time of the July 1974 general election, amid the Bush War, Harper had formed a small bloc of independents called the "Harper Group". In an attempt to co-ordinate opposition to the Rhodesian Front, the group made an election agreement with the Rhodesia Party (RP), which had been formed two years earlier; according to The Bulletin it was "seriously hampered by lack of established leadership" but nevertheless offered "the only real resistance [to the RF] in the polls". Shortly before election day, Harper told a meeting of 300 people that under the present system, which was geared to eventually bring parity between black and white Rhodesians, racial tension would increase and "the white man will be forced out of the country." He said that while he was not prepared to let black Rhodesians take control of the government, he understood that some form of power-sharing between the races was imperative to the country's future. The RF won all 50 white roll seats, denying the RP any representation in parliament; Harper himself lost decisively in the southern Salisbury constituency of Hatfield.

By the end of 1974, Harper had formed the United Conservative Party, which called for separate black and white legislatures. He subsequently reacted with revulsion each time Smith moved towards settlement with black nationalist factions. In December that year he described Smith's announcement of a ceasefire in the run-up to the Victoria Falls Conference as a "ghastly capitulation". In 1976, when Smith announced his acceptance of unconditional majority rule by 1978, Harper accused the Prime Minister of "selling us out". "The mind boggles at the enormous impertinence and audacity of this man Smith," he said.

In December 1975, two months after the disappearance of the prominent lawyer and black nationalist leader Edson Sithole from the middle of Salisbury, along with his secretary Miriam Mhlanga, Harper stepped forward claiming that the Rhodesian state had kidnapped them. In what became known as the "Harper Memorandum", the ex-minister alleged that Special Branch had interrogated Sithole at Goromonzi prison and then shuttled him between holding points around the country. The Rhodesian government denied that it was holding Sithole, adding that he was not under any form of restriction. Sithole and Mhlanga were never seen again, and their fate has never been explained. In modern Zimbabwe it is generally accepted that they were abducted and killed by agents of the Rhodesian government.

== Emigration to South Africa and death ==
Smith and non-militant nationalists agreed to what became the Internal Settlement in March 1978, and in January the following year whites backed the new majority rule constitution by 85% in a national referendum. Multiracial elections were held in April 1979 with the country due to be reconstituted as Zimbabwe Rhodesia afterwards. By this time Harper had already left the country; The Guardian reported shortly before the elections that he was "already settled in South Africa". Zimbabwe Rhodesia, with Bishop Abel Muzorewa as Prime Minister, failed to win international acceptance and following the Lancaster House Agreement of December 1979, the UK oversaw a process leading to fresh elections in which the guerrilla leader Robert Mugabe was elected Prime Minister. The UK granted independence to the country as Zimbabwe in April 1980. Harper died on 8 September 2006, at the age of 90.

== Notes and references ==
Bibliography

- Collier, Richard (2002). The Few: Summer 1940, The Battle of Britain. London: Orion Books. ISBN 978-0-297-84345-0.
- Flower, Ken (1987). Serving Secretly: Rhodesia's CIO Chief on Record. Johannesburg: Galago Publishing. ISBN 978-0-947020-27-9.
- Gillison, Douglas (1962). Royal Australian Air Force, 1939–1942. Canberra: Australian War Memorial. OCLC 480400608.
- Good, Robert C (1973). UDI: The International Politics of the Rhodesian Rebellion. London: Faber and Faber. ISBN 978-0-691-05647-0.
- Gowlland-Debbas, Vera (1990). Collective Responses to Illegal Acts in International Law: United Nations action in the question of Southern Rhodesia (First ed.). Leiden and New York: Martinus Nijhoff Publishers. ISBN 0-7923-0811-5.
- Jackson, Robert H (1990). Quasi-States: Sovereignty, International Relations and the Third World. Cambridge, England: Cambridge University Press. ISBN 978-0-521-44783-6.
- Kenrick, David (2019). Decolonisation, Identity and Nation in Rhodesia, 1964-1979: A Race Against Time. Cham: Springer. ISBN 978-3-030-32698-2.
- Shamuyarira, Nathan (1966). Crisis in Rhodesia. New York: Transatlantic Arts. OCLC 942260.
- Smith, Ian (1997). The Great Betrayal: The Memoirs of Ian Douglas Smith. London: John Blake Publishing. ISBN 1-85782-176-9.
- Weinrich, A K H (1973). Black and White Elites in Rural Rhodesia. Manchester: Manchester University Press. ISBN 978-0-7190-0533-6.
- Willson, F M G, ed. (1963). Source Book of Parliamentary Elections and Referenda in Southern Rhodesia, 1898–1962. Salisbury: Department of Government, University College of Rhodesia and Nyasaland. OCLC 219295658.
- Wood, J R T (2005). So Far and No Further! Rhodesia's Bid for Independence During the Retreat From Empire 1959–1965. Victoria, British Columbia: Trafford Publishing. ISBN 978-1-4120-4952-8.
- Wood, J R T (2008). A Matter of Weeks Rather Than Months: The Impasse Between Harold Wilson and Ian Smith: Sanctions, Aborted Settlements and War 1965–1969. Victoria, British Columbia: Trafford Publishing. ISBN 978-1-4251-4807-2.
- Wynn, Kenneth G (2015) [1989]. Men of the Battle of Britain: A Biographical Dictionary of the Few. Barnsley: Pen & Sword Books. ISBN 978-1-4738-4767-5.
- Young, Kenneth (1969) [1967]. Rhodesia and Independence: A Study in British Colonial Policy. London: J M Dent & Sons. OCLC 955160.
- Africa Today. London: Africa Books. 1981. OCLC 9334568.
- Political Handbook of the World. New York: McGraw-Hill. 1978. ISBN 978-0-07-003690-1.

Southern Rhodesian Legislative Assembly
Preceded by Max Buchan	Member of Parliament for Gatooma; 1958–1968	Succeeded by George Munro
Political offices
Preceded by Stewart Aitken-Cade	Leader of the Opposition; 1960 – 1962	Succeeded by William Cary
Preceded by Geoffrey Ellman-Brown	Minister of Roads and Road Traffic; 1962 – 1964	Succeeded by Harry Reedman as Minister of Roads
Preceded by Geoffrey Ellman-Brown	Minister of Irrigation; 1962 – 1963	Succeeded by Himself as Minister of Water Development
New title	Minister of Water Development; 1963 – 1964	Succeeded by Philip van Heerden
Preceded by Leslie Cullinan	Minister of Transport and Power; 1963 – 1964	Succeeded by George Rudland
Preceded by Jack Howman	Minister of Internal Affairs; 1964 – 1968	Succeeded by Lance Smith
Preceded by Winston Field	Minister of the Public Service; 1964 – 1968	Succeeded by Jack Howman
