= John Wrathall =

Former President of Rhodesia

The Honourable John Wrathall GCLM ID

2nd President of Rhodesia
- In office 14 January 1976 – 31 August 1978
- Prime Minister: Ian Smith
- Preceded by: Henry Everard (Acting)
- Succeeded by: Henry Everard (Acting)

Minister of African Education
- In office 11 October 1963 – 14 May 1964
- Prime Minister: Ian Smith
- Preceded by: Jack Howman
- Succeeded by: Post abolished

Minister of Education
- In office 1 January 1964 – 14 April 1964
- Prime Minister: Ian Smith
- Preceded by: George Arthur Davenport
- Succeeded by: Arthur Philip Smith

Minister of Health
- In office 29 November 1963 – 14 April 1964
- Prime Minister: Ian Smith
- Preceded by: Patrick Bissett Fletcher
- Succeeded by: Ian Finlay McLean

Minister of Finance
- In office 14 April 1964 – January 1976
- Prime Minister: Ian Smith
- Preceded by: Ian Smith
- Succeeded by: David Smith

Member of the Southern Rhodesian Legislative Assembly for Bulawayo South
- In office 27 January 1954 – 5 June 1958
- Preceded by: Henry Holmes
- Succeeded by: Benny Goldstein

Member of the Southern Rhodesian Legislative Assembly for Bulawayo North
- In office 14 December 1962 – 10 April 1970
- Preceded by: Ian Finlay McLean
- Succeeded by: Assembly dissolved

Member of the House of Assembly of Rhodesia for Bulawayo North
- In office 10 April 1970 – 30 July 1974
- Preceded by: New seat
- Succeeded by: Denis Walker

Member of the Rhodesian Senate
- In office 1974–1976

Personal details
- Born: 28 August 1913 Lancaster, Lancashire, England
- Died: 31 August 1978 (aged 65) Salisbury, Rhodesia
- Spouse: Doreen Wrathall (died 2009)
- Relations: Jonathan Wrathall, Christopher Wrathall
- Awards: Legion of Merit GCLM Independence Decoration ID

John James Wrathall GCLM ID (28 August 1913 – 31 August 1978), was a British-born Rhodesian politician. He was the last white President of Rhodesia (later holders of the post were only acting as such). He formerly worked as a chartered accountant.

== Early life ==
Wrathall was born in Lancaster in Lancashire, Great Britain, and went to Lancaster Royal Grammar School. Having qualified as a chartered accountant in 1935, he emigrated to Southern Rhodesia the next year. He worked for the Southern Rhodesian Government in its income tax department for the next ten years.

== Rhodesian career ==
In 1946 Wrathall set up in private practice as an accountant in Bulawayo and also became involved in politics. In 1949 he was elected to Bulawayo City Council, where he served for a decade. Wrathall was elected to the Legislative Assembly for Bulawayo South in the 1954 general election, as a member of the United Federal Party, then led by Garfield Todd, but stood down after one term in 1958.

== Ministerial office ==
By 1962 Wrathall was no longer a supporter of the United Federal Party and became a founder member of the Rhodesian Front under Winston Field. He was elected in Bulawayo North in the December 1962 election under the RF banner, defeating the incumbent, Cyril Hatty, by 67 votes. As one of the party's most experienced members, in October 1963 he was made Minister of African Education. A month later he also took on the Ministry of Health, which was being transferred from the Federation of Rhodesia and Nyasaland on its demise at the end of 1963.

Wrathall was among the members of the Rhodesian Front who deposed Winston Field and instead installed Ian Smith as Prime Minister in April 1964. Smith promoted him to be Minister of Finance and of Posts and Telecommunications. As such, he was one of the signatories to the Unilateral Declaration of Independence (UDI) on 11 November 1965. He was Deputy Prime Minister from 7 September 1966 when Clifford Dupont was named Officer Administering the Government. Known as "the quiet man of Rhodesian politics", Wrathall nevertheless was a key figure in the secret struggle against United Nations sanctions imposed after UDI.

As Minister of Finance, Wrathall also oversaw the adoption of a new decimal currency to replace the Rhodesian pound, known as the Rhodesian dollar, a name which he regarded as having international substance.

In July 1973 Wrathall ceded his responsibility as Minister of Posts; during the 1974 general election he stood down from the House of Assembly and transferred to the Senate. In 1975 he presented his 12th (and last) consecutive Budget as Rhodesia's longest serving Minister of Finance.

== Presidency ==
In 1976, Wrathall became the second President of Rhodesia, succeeding Clifford Dupont. On 14 January of that year, he was sworn in as president by the Chief Justice, Sir Hugh Beadle, in a ceremony at Government House witnessed by Prime Minister Ian Smith and his Cabinet ministers. Wrathall served for two and a half years, and died in office of a heart attack.

== Awards ==
- Legion of Merit (Grand Commander - Civilian) (GCLM) (Rhodesia)
- Independence Decoration (ID) (Rhodesia)

Southern Rhodesian Legislative Assembly
Preceded by Henry Holmes	Member of Parliament for Bulawayo South; 1954–1958	Succeeded by Benny Goldstein
Preceded by Ian Finlay McLean	Member of Parliament for Bulawayo North; 1962–1970	Assembly dissolved
House of Assembly of Rhodesia
New title	Member of Parliament for Bulawayo North; 1970–1974	Succeeded by Denis Walker
Political offices
Preceded by Jack Howman	Minister of African Education; 1963–1964	Post abolished
Vacant Title last held by Patrick Bissett Fletcher	Minister of Health; 1963–1964	Succeeded by Ian Finlay McLean
Vacant Title last held by George Arthur Davenport	Minister of Education; 1964	Succeeded by Arthur Philip Smith
Preceded by Ian Smith as Minister of the Treasury	Minister of Finance; 1964–1976	Succeeded by David Smith
Preceded by Ian Smith	Minister of Posts; 1964–1973	Succeeded by Roger Hawkins
Preceded by Clifford Dupont	Deputy Prime Minister of Rhodesia; 1966–1976	Succeeded by David Smith
Preceded by Clifford Dupont	President of Rhodesia; 1976–1978	Succeeded by Henry Everard (Acting)
