= P. K. van der Byl =

Rhodesian politician (1923-1999)

The Honourable P. K. van der Byl GLM ID

Minister of Foreign Affairs of Rhodesia
- In office 2 August 1974 – 1 June 1979
- Prime Minister: Ian Smith
- Preceded by: Jack Howman
- Succeeded by: Office abolished

Personal details
- Born: Pieter Kenyon Fleming-Voltelyn van der Byl; 11 November 1923 Cape Town, Union of South Africa
- Died: 15 November 1999 (aged 76) Caledon, South Africa
- Party: Rhodesian Front
- Spouse: Princess Charlotte of Liechtenstein (m. 1979)
- Children: 3
- Parents: Pieter van der Byl; Joyce Clare Fleming
- Education: Pembroke College, Cambridge
- Awards: Legion of Merit GLM Independence Decoration ID

Military service
- Allegiance: South Africa
- Branch/service: South African Army
- Battles/wars: World War II

Pieter Kenyon Fleming-Voltelyn van der Byl GLM ID (11 November 1923 – 15 November 1999) was a Rhodesian politician who served as his country's Foreign Minister from 1974 to 1979 as a member of the Rhodesian Front (RF). A close associate of Prime Minister Ian Smith, Van der Byl opposed attempts to compromise with the British government and domestic black nationalist opposition on the issue of majority rule throughout most of his time in government. However, in the late 1970s, he supported the moves which led to majority rule and internationally recognised independence for Zimbabwe.

Van der Byl was born and raised in Cape Town, the son of the South African politician P V van der Byl, and served in the Middle East and Europe during the Second World War. After a high-flying international education, he moved to the self-governing British colony of Southern Rhodesia in 1950 to manage family farms. He went into politics in the early 1960s through his involvement with farming trade bodies, and became a government minister responsible for propaganda. One of the leading agitators for Rhodesia's Unilateral Declaration of Independence in 1965, Van der Byl was afterwards responsible for introducing press censorship. He was unsuccessful in his attempt to persuade international opinion to recognise Rhodesia, but was popular among members of his own party.

Promoted to the cabinet in 1968, Van der Byl became a spokesman for the Rhodesian government and crafted a public image as a die-hard supporter of continued white minority rule. In 1974 he was made Minister of Foreign Affairs and Defence at a time when Rhodesia's only remaining ally, South Africa, was supplying military aid. His extreme views and brusque manner made him a surprising choice for a diplomat (a November 1976 profile in The Times described him as "a man calculated to give offence"). After offending the South African government, Van der Byl was removed from the Defence Ministry.

In the late 1970s Van der Byl was willing to endorse the Smith government's negotiations with moderate black nationalist leaders and rejected attempts by international missions to broker an agreement. He served in the short-lived government of Zimbabwe Rhodesia in 1979, following the Internal Settlement. After the country's reconstitution as Zimbabwe in 1980, Van der Byl remained in politics and close to Ian Smith; he loudly attacked former RF colleagues who had gone over to support Robert Mugabe. He retired to South Africa after the Mugabe government abolished the parliamentary seats reserved for whites in 1987, and died in 1999 at the age of 76.

== Family and early life ==
Van der Byl was born in Cape Town, the son of Joyce Clare Fleming, a Scot, and Afrikaner Major Pieter Voltelyn Graham van der Byl, a member of Jan Smuts' South African cabinet during World War II. Like his father, Van der Byl was educated at the Diocesan College in Rondebosch but his studies were interrupted by war in 1941. He served with the South African Army during the Second World War and served with the British 7th Queen's Own Hussars; he saw active service in the Middle East, Italy and Austria.

After being demobilised, Van der Byl studied law at Pembroke College, Cambridge, where his aristocratic manner stood out. "P. K." was always elegantly dressed and coiffured, and acquired the nickname "the Piccadilly Dutchman". He obtained a Third-class degree in his Part II Law examinations in 1947, and went on from Cambridge to study at Harvard University Graduate School of Business Administration from 1947 to 1948 (although he did not obtain a degree at the latter). He also studied at the University of the Witwatersrand in South Africa.

One of the most conspicuous features of Van der Byl was his manner of speech: although his ancestry was Cape Dutch and his early life was in Cape Town, South Africa, he had what were described (by Chris Whitehead, editor of Rhodesians Worldwide) as "what he thought was an aristocratic English nasal drawl and imperial English mannerisms". Whitehead was of the opinion that Van der Byl had "adopted" this accent, in common with others who heard him like Denis Hills, who wrote of Van der Byl having "a flow of mannered phrases which he delivers in a flawed Guards officer accent".

This personal characteristic was intensely irritating to many people including South African government ministers, but Van der Byl's aristocratic mannerisms appeared uncontentious to many Rhodesian whites. They believed that his "nasal drawl" was the product of his time as an officer in the Hussars and his Cambridge education: William Higham described him as "a popular Minister of Defence who, despite his British upper crust accent – undoubtedly honed during his swashbuckling career as an officer in the hussars – hailed from a noble Cape family."

=== Move to Rhodesia ===
Van der Byl moved to Southern Rhodesia in 1950 to manage some of his family's tobacco farming interests, hoping to make his own fortune. Having visited the country many times as a youth, he remarked that after reading about the profits to be made from tobacco he "suddenly got a rush of blood to the crotch about the tobacco boom and decided I was going to go up there and make the family fortune in a place I liked and wanted to be in." He welcomed the move as it allowed him to indulge his hobby of big game hunting: in that year in Angola, then under Portuguese rule, he set a world record for the biggest elephant shot, which stood until 1955.

In 1957 Van der Byl was made a Director of the United Dominions Corporation (Rhodesia) Ltd, having already become an active member of the Rhodesia Tobacco Association. In 1956, he was elected by the members of the Selous–Gadzema district to represent them on the Tobacco Association council. He was also Deputy Chair of the Selous Farmers' Association in 1957. His first involvement in government was in 1960 when the Rhodesia Tobacco Association made him one of their representatives on the National Native Labour Commission, on which he served for two years. In 1961, he also represented the Rhodesia Tobacco Association on the council of the Rhodesian National Farmers' Union. He was recognised as a leading spokesman for Rhodesian tobacco farmers.

Dominion Party politician Winston Field had also led the Rhodesia Tobacco Association, and Van der Byl agreed with him on politics in general. He joined the Rhodesian Front when it was set up under Field's leadership. At the 1962 general election, Van der Byl was elected comfortably to the Legislative Assembly for the Hartley constituency, a rural area to the south-west of Salisbury.

== Political career ==
=== Ministerial office ===
In 1963, Winston Field appointed Van der Byl as a junior government whip, and on 16 March 1964 he was made Parliamentary Secretary to the Ministry of Justice with responsibility for the Information Service. Although the Van der Byl family were identified as strongly liberal in South African politics, he became identified with the right wing of the party and helped to depose Field from the premiership in early April 1964, when Field failed to persuade the British government to grant Southern Rhodesia its independence. The new Prime Minister, Ian Smith, appointed him Deputy Minister for Information. At this time, Van der Byl's chief adviser was a South African called Ivor Benson, who also served as press censor. Benson believed that an international communist conspiracy was plotting to overthrow white rule in Rhodesia.

Speaking in the Legislative Assembly on 12 August 1964 he attacked proposals for greater independence for broadcasters by referring to what he perceived to be the social effect in Britain:

To suggest that the BBC, forming opinion in the minds of the people of England, has been an influence for good in any way, when you consider the criminality of large areas of London; when you consider the Mods and Rockers, and all those other things; when you consider the total moral underminings which have been taking place in England, much to all our distress, in the last fifteen to twenty years, the Hon. Member can hardly bring that up as an argument in favour of the freedom of broadcasting.

By the end of 1964, Van der Byl and his Ministry had control of broadcasting in Rhodesia. Speaking in Parliament he described the aims of his Department as "not merely to disseminate information from an interesting point of view but to play its part in fighting the propaganda battle on behalf of the country". He defined propaganda as "simply the propagation of the faith and the belief in any particular ideology or thing", and also stated that the department would seek the "resuscitation of the determination of the European to survive and fight for his rights".

=== 1965 election ===
In May 1965 the Rhodesian Front government went to the country in a general election with Van der Byl one of the leading campaigners. Discussion of unilaterally declaring independence had already begun. Van der Byl argued that only a small fraction of Rhodesian business opposed it; however, his campaign speeches typically included an argument against business involvement in politics. He cited Johannesburg mining interests' support for the Progressive Party in South Africa, big business support for the Nazi Party in Germany, and the Bolshevik revolution in Russia being financed by United States big business.

The Rhodesian Front won a landslide victory, winning every single one of the 50 constituencies which had predominantly European voters. At the Rhodesian Front Congress of August 1965, party members strongly attacked the press for failing to support the government. A demand for it to be made compulsory for all political articles to be signed by the author met with Van der Byl's approval.

=== UDI ===
Within the government, Van der Byl was one of the loudest voices urging Ian Smith to proceed to a Unilateral Declaration of Independence. He angrily denounced the threat of sanctions from Britain, saying on 4 May 1965 that economic destruction of Rhodesia would mean total economic destruction of Zambia, formerly Northern Rhodesia. This statement was interpreted as a military threat by David Butler, the Leader of the Opposition. Van der Byl was given the task of selling the UDI to Rhodesian whites and to world opinion. In September 1965, it was announced that he would tour the United Kingdom to promote Rhodesian independence. According to David Steel, he claimed then that France and the United States would lead the international recognition of the UDI government. He was appointed Deputy Minister of Information on 22 October and so was present at, but did not sign, the Unilateral Declaration of Independence on 11 November 1965.

Van der Byl was greeted by a speech strongly critical of the Rhodesian government from the Archbishop of Canterbury, Michael Ramsey, who supported the use of armed force to bring the Rhodesians in line with United Kingdom policy on decolonisation. He responded by comparing the speech to "the tragic connivance at the destruction of Czechoslovakia in exchange for the useless appeasement at Munich in 1938". Van der Byl's response used the phrase "kith and kin" to refer to the ethnic links between the white Rhodesians and the people of the United Kingdom. He saw no contradiction between signing a letter declaring "constant loyalty" to the Queen and declaring independence a few days later; the Rhodesian Government was careful at the time of UDI to state its continued loyalty to the Crown, though it later declared Rhodesia a republic.

Despite his enthusiasm for propaganda, Van der Byl was outraged when the BBC subsequently set up a radio station at Francistown in Botswana which broadcast for 27 months, criticising UDI and urging Rhodesians to revoke it. He was later to claim the station was inciting violence, although this was denied by some who had been regular listeners. On 26 January 1966, two months after the UDI, Van der Byl was willing to be quoted as saying that Rhodesian Army troops would follow a "scorched earth" policy should the United Kingdom send in troops, comparing their position to that of the Red Army when Nazi forces invaded the Soviet Union in 1941. He was highly critical of Harold Wilson, describing him as a "highly dangerous, uninformed and conceited little man".

=== Censorship ===
The Rhodesia Herald front page of 21 September 1966 shows the effect of censorship imposed by Van der Byl's ministry.

Internally, his policy was enforced through Ministry control of TV and radio and through censorship of newspapers. From 31 December 1965, the Ministry of Information expanded its brief and was renamed the Ministry of Information, Immigration and Tourism, which meant that it was also responsible for deciding whether to grant or revoke permits to visit Rhodesia. Several foreign journalists were expelled: John Worrall, correspondent for The Guardian, went in January 1969. The Rhodesia Herald, then in opposition to both the Rhodesian Front and UDI, frequently appeared with large white spaces on its news pages where censored stories had been placed. Stories and editorials personally critical of Van der Byl were immediately removed.

Censorship was tightened still further on 8 February 1966 when it was made illegal to indicate where material had been removed. The censor was also given the power to alter existing material or to move it around the newspaper. Dr Ahrn Palley, the lone white opposition MP, described the powers as "censorship gone mad", and insisted that there would no longer be any guarantee that anything published in the newspapers was authentic. Van der Byl responded by saying that the new measures were a reflection on the newspapers which had made such powers necessary. In 1967 Van der Byl was reported by Malcolm Smith, the former editor of the Herald, as remarking that a high degree of self-censorship was required, and support for the government was essential.

The Herald (and the Bulawayo Chronicle) defied the restrictions, boldly printing blank spaces which identified removed material. Van der Byl personally visited the newspaper offices on the day the new regulations came in to warn the staff that if the paper was printed as proposed, they would "publish at your peril". However the papers continued to appear with identifiable censorship in defiance of the government, and in 1968 the regulations were scrapped.

==== Deportation ====
Shortly after UDI, 46 academics working at University College, a racially non-segregated institution, in Rhodesia wrote to The Times in London, denouncing the move. Officers of the British South Africa Police visited many of those who had signed to search their houses. Shortly afterwards, the residence permit of one of the academics came up for renewal, which would normally be automatic. In fact, it was revoked and the academic was deported. Van der Byl was the responsible minister and all but admitted that the reason was his opposition to UDI.

Van der Byl's strategy seemed to work at home, with many Rhodesians remaining unaware until the end just how much was their country's vulnerability and isolation. The Times was later to describe him as a "skilled propagandist who believed his own propaganda". When sanctions on Rhodesia were confirmed in January 1967, Van der Byl compared their situation with Spain following World War II, saying that the isolation of Spain had not stopped it from becoming one of the most advanced and economically successful countries in Europe. However, when Van der Byl made informal approaches in April 1966 to see if he might visit Britain "for social reasons" during a tour of Europe, the Commonwealth Relations Office replied that he would not be recognised as enjoying any form of recognition or immunity. Other European governments refused to recognise his passport and expelled him from the country.

=== Wider role in politics ===
On 13 September 1968 he was promoted to be the full Minister of Information, Immigration and Tourism. Van der Byl's aristocratic background, military experience and academic credentials combined to give him an almost iconic status within the Rhodesian Front. Many were impressed by his exploits as a big-game hunter, which began when he shot his first lion in a garden in Northern Rhodesia at the age of 15. Writing in South Africa's Daily Dispatch, Michael Hartnack remarked that many in the Rhodesian Front believed him to be "a 19th century-style connoisseur, a man of culture and an aristocrat-statesman", adding that "poseurs are an incipient hazard in any unsophisticated society". Within the somewhat claustrophobic confines of white Rhodesian society outside the RF, Van der Byl was achieving some degree of respect.

In politics he assumed the position of hard-line opponent of any form of compromise with domestic opponents or the international community. He made little secret of his willingness to succeed Ian Smith as Prime Minister if Smith showed even "the least whiff of surrender", and did his best to discourage attempts to get the Rhodesians to compromise. When Abel Muzorewa had his passport withdrawn in September 1972 after returning from a successful visit to London, the government did not attempt to counter the rumour that its action was taken following Van der Byl's personal order.

In April 1972 Van der Byl sparked a row over the agreement which Rhodesia and the United Kingdom had made in November 1971. Under this agreement, Rhodesia had agreed to certain concessions to African nationalism in return for the prospect of recognition of its independence; however, implementation of the agreement was to be delayed until the Pearce Commission reported on whether the settlement proposals would be approved by the people of Rhodesia. Van der Byl insisted that Rhodesia would not implement any part of the agreement unless Rhodesia's independence was first acknowledged, regardless of the answer from the Pearce Commission. When the Pearce Commission reported that the European, Asian and Coloured (mixed race) populations of Rhodesia were in support but the African population were opposed, the agreement was ditched. Many outside and inside Rhodesia had hoped that the government would implement some of the agreement even if Pearce reported against it.

His derision of working class British Labour politicians also caused problems. When, in January 1966, three visiting Labour MPs were manhandled, kicked and punched while attempting to address 400 supporters of the Rhodesian Front, Van der Byl blamed the three for refusing an offer from his Ministry to co-ordinate the visit, and pointed out that they were breaking the law which required government permission for any political meeting of more than 12 people.

"The most offensive and ignorant person in authority whom I have ever met. A false Englishman in the manner of Ribbentrop. Against elections, against everything except intrigue and condescension".

— Conservative MP Douglas Hurd describes Van der Byl in his 2003 memoirs

The propaganda circulated by his Ministry (typically including references to "happy, smiling natives") was considered laughable. Visiting British journalist Peregrine Worsthorne, who knew Van der Byl socially, reported seeing a copy of Mein Kampf on his coffee table. His propaganda strategy became increasingly unsuccessful abroad, where Van der Byl alienated many of the foreign journalists and politicians that he came into contact with. Max Hastings, then reporting for the Evening Standard, described him as "that grotesque parody of a Dornford Yates English gentleman" and said that he and Smith "would have seemed ludicrous figures, had they not possessed the power of life and death over millions of people"; Van der Byl had him deported.

While still popular with the Rhodesian Front members, he was criticised at the 1972 Party Congress for his lack of success in improving Rhodesia's image around the world; however, he retained the confidence of Ian Smith and was kept on in a government reshuffle on 24 May 1973. That winter saw him promote a new Broadcasting Bill to transfer control of the monopoly Rhodesian Broadcasting Corporation. Allan Savory, then the lone white opposition MP, criticised the Bill for the composition of the proposed board, which was dominated by strong supporters of the Rhodesian Front. Van der Byl insisted, somewhat unsuccessfully to foreign observers, that the government was not trying to take over broadcasting.

=== Minister of Defence ===
Van der Byl was appointed Minister of Foreign Affairs and Defence on 2 August 1974. These were two distinct portfolios, the first of which (Foreign Affairs) did not amount to much in a state which lacked any form of international recognition. The Defence portfolio, at a time when Rhodesia was drifting into civil war, was an important post; although his previous political experience had been largely in the area of public relations, he was now charged with responsibilities which were central to the survival of Rhodesia.

If the battle should wax fiercer, there can be no question of surrender. We shall contest every river, every crossroads, every village, every town and every kopje.

— Van der Byl attempts to inspire the Rhodesian troops

He promoted aggressive measures against the insurgents, and in so doing, he also sought to raise his own political profile. Clad in immaculately tailored battledress, he would fly by helicopter to a beleaguered army outpost; wearing dark glasses and sporting a swagger stick, deliver a rousing speech for the benefit of the troops and the TV cameras – then return to Salisbury in time for dinner. He drew heavily on Winston Churchill's oratory style for some of his inspiring speeches. As Minister of Defence, Van der Byl was known to join army counter-insurgency operations while armed with a hunting rifle (with the words "I'd like to bag one of these chaps ..."), and would regularly visit army positions and entertain the troops with his own generous supply of "scotch whisky and fine wines". Such behaviour endeared him to many in Rhodesia: he was far more popular with the troops than his predecessor as Minister of Defence, Jack Howman. However, this popularity did not extend to senior members of the South African and Rhodesian governments.

Rhodesia's strategic position underwent a fundamental change in June 1975 when the Portuguese government suddenly withdrew from Mozambique which bordered Rhodesia on the east. Mozambique now came under the control of a Soviet-allied government which was supportive of black nationalist forces in both South Africa and Rhodesia. This created a delicate situation since Rhodesia's main road and rail links to the outside world were via the Mozambican ports of Beira and Maputo. Initially, the new Mozambican government allowed the Rhodesians continued use of these links. This was so even while ZANU guerrillas were allowed to base themselves in Tete province adjoining north eastern Rhodesia.

There were rumours in February 1976 that Soviet tanks were being unloaded in Mozambique to help in the war. Unluckily for Van der Byl, the British Foreign Office minister was David Ennals, one of those who had received rough treatment in 1966. Ennals announced that in the event of a racial war breaking out in Rhodesia, there would be no British help. Van der Byl responded by claiming this indicated Britain accepting Rhodesia's independence. He attacked Abel Muzorewa for supporting President Machel, saying that "being a good churchman and a Bishop there is a very strong possibility he might be a communist".

Following the example of Mozambique, the Zambian and Botswana governments permitted guerrillas to establish bases from which they could threaten and infiltrate Rhodesia. Van der Byl told a newspaper reporter that this had to be expected. As infiltration grew, he declared at the beginning of July that the Rhodesian Army would not hesitate to bomb and destroy villages that harboured guerillas.

In 1975 and 1976, the South African government conducted delicate negotiations with neighbouring states: the South Africans wanted to encourage those states to maintain economic relations with South Africa and Rhodesia while limiting the activities of the ANC, ZANU and ZAPU. However, increasingly aggressive actions by the Rhodesian army outside its own borders resulted in the failure of this conciliatory approach.

A cross-border Selous Scouts raid into Mozambique on 9 August 1976 (dubbed "the Nyadzonya Raid") killed over 1,000 people without Rhodesian fatalities, with Van der Byl insisting that the government had irrefutable proof that the raid had targeted a guerrilla training camp. He was unwilling to disclose the nature of the proof, though he invited the UN to conduct its own investigation into the raid. The raid produced a high body count and a major haul of intelligence and captured arms; according to ZANLA's own figures, which were not publicly circulated, most of those present in the camp had been armed guerrillas, though there were some civilians present. (Note: The official ZANLA report, dated 19 August 1976, specifies that before the raid on Nyadzonya there had been 5,250 people in the camp, of whom 604 were unarmed refugees and the rest were armed guerrilla fighters. The report says that 1,028 guerrillas were killed, 309 were wounded and around 1,000 had gone missing. "It should be mentioned ... that the comrades have only one desire, to go for training," it goes on to say: "... The attitude of the comrades towards the revolution is now much deeper than before ... keeping them in bases often referred to as "Refugee Camps" keeps robbing them of their morale and their desire to concentrate seriously on revolutionary matters".) In a successful attempt to win global sympathy, ZANU clamoured that Nyadzonya had been full of unarmed refugees, leading most international opinion to condemn the Rhodesian raid as a massacre. Although cross-border raids into Mozambique had been approved by the Rhodesian cabinet, the depth and severity of the August incursion was greater than had been intended. Van der Byl had sanctioned the incursion largely on his own initiative. Although a tactical success, the incursion caused a final break with Zambia and Mozambique. The South African government was greatly displeased that its earlier diplomatic efforts were compromised and made this clear to Ian Smith. Smith appeared to consider this "the final straw" as far as Van der Byl's defence portfolio was concerned.

=== Foreign affairs ===
Van der Byl took over at a time when South Africa was putting increasing pressure on the Rhodesians to make an agreement on majority rule. In March 1975, he had to fly urgently to Cape Town to explain why the Rhodesian government had detained Rev. Ndabaningi Sithole of the Zimbabwe African National Union, who was accused of plotting against other black nationalist leaders. The South Africans were extremely displeased with this action and suspected that the real reason was that the Rhodesians objected to Sithole and preferred to negotiate with Joshua Nkomo. Van der Byl was unsuccessful in reassuring the South Africans and Ian Smith was forced to follow him.

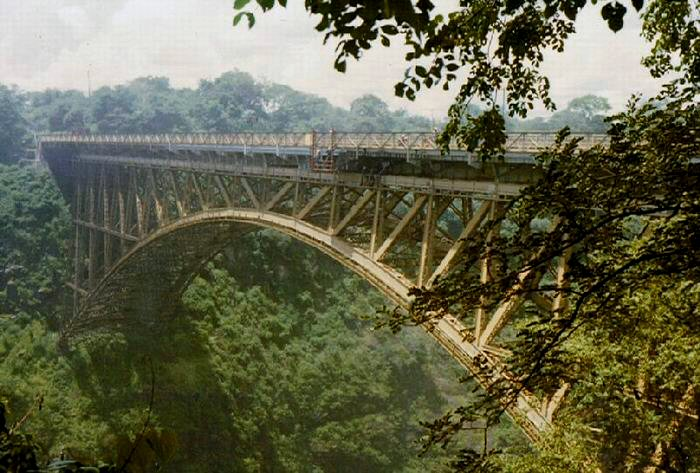
The Victoria Falls Conference took place at the centre of the Victoria Falls Bridge in August 1975.

Gradually the South Africans grew unwilling to help Rhodesia. The remaining 200 South African policemen transferred to help in the guerilla war were removed suddenly in August 1975, a move which appeared to precede even more disengagement. Van der Byl responded in a speech on 8 August which asserted that "The terrorists who are trained and equipped outside our border and who invade our country with the willing help of other governments are here for a much wider purpose than the overthrow of Rhodesia. They are here to represent a force which sees Rhodesia as just one more stepping stone to victory over South Africa because they see South Africa as a vital key to the security of America, Europe and the rest of the western world."

When the Rhodesian government held talks with the African National Council on the railway bridge across the Victoria Falls in August 1975 (the train in which the talks took place was strategically in the middle of the bridge so that the ANC were in Zambia while the Rhodesians remained in Rhodesia), Van der Byl was not a member of the Rhodesian delegation. This was a curious omission given his position. He did however participate in talks with Joshua Nkomo that December.

Van der Byl's habit of referring to the African population as "munts" (he asserted that "Rhodesia is able to handle the munts") led to extreme unpopularity with the South African government, and he did not attend talks with South African Prime Minister John Vorster in October 1975. This was interpreted as being connected to Vorster's dislike of Van der Byl who, despite being of Afrikaner origin, had adopted English mannerisms.

When, on 26 August 1976, the South African government announced the withdrawal of all its military helicopter crews from Rhodesia, Van der Byl was outspoken in his criticism and Vorster was reported to have refused to have anything to do with "that dreadful man Van der Byl." Smith decided that he "clearly ... had no option" and on 9 September 1976 executed a sudden cabinet reshuffle that ended Van der Byl's tenure as Defence Minister. Smith claimed the South African dislike of Van der Byl was partly motivated by the memory of his father, who had been in opposition to the National Party.

=== Contribution to diplomacy ===
As the prominence of the issue of Rhodesia increased in the late 1970s, attention on Van der Byl increased. Reporters noted his impressively quotable lines at press conferences (such as his explanation for why the Rhodesian government did not usually give the names of guerrillas which it had hanged: "Why should we? Anyway, it's academic because they're normally dead after it"). While negotiating with the Patriotic Front put together by ZANU and ZAPU at the Geneva Conference in November 1976, he described ZANU leader Robert Mugabe as "this bloodthirsty Marxist puppet" and the Patriotic Front proposals as "almost a parody, a music hall caricature of communist invective". Mugabe repeatedly arrived late to the meetings held during the conference, and on one occasion Van der Byl tersely reprimanded the ZANU leader for his tardiness. Mugabe flew into a rage and shouted across the table at Van der Byl, calling the Rhodesian minister a "foul-mouthed bloody fool!"

... it is better to fight to the last man and the last cartridge and die with some honour. Because, what is being presented to us here is a degree of humiliation ...

— Van der Byl comments on a British peace plan in 1977

At this conference, which was organised by Britain with American support, Van der Byl rejected the idea of an interim British presence in Rhodesia during a transition to majority rule, which was identified as one of the few ways of persuading the Patriotic Front to endorse a settlement. The conference was adjourned by the British foreign minister, Anthony Crosland, on 14 December 1976, and ultimately never reconvened. The nationalist leaders said they would not return to Geneva or take part in any further talks unless immediate black rule were made the only topic for discussion. Soon after, on 7 January 1977, Van der Byl announced the Rhodesian government's rejection of every proposal made in Geneva.

Later that month, Van der Byl was finding pressure put on him by more moderate voices within Rhodesia and hinted that the government might amend the Land Tenure Act, which effectively split the country into sections reserved for each racial group. He also remarked that Bishop Abel Muzorewa "can be said to represent the African in this country", which indicated the direction in which the Smith government was hoping to travel: an accommodation with moderate voices within Rhodesia was likely to be a better end than a capitulation to the Patriotic Front. Van der Byl was prepared to support this strategy and did not go along with the 12 Rhodesian Front MPs who formed the Rhodesian Action Party in early 1977 claiming that the Front had not adhered to party principles.

Although Van der Byl was now prepared to say that he supported the transition to majority rule, he was quick to put restrictions on it when interviewed in April 1977. He insisted that majority rule would only be possible on a "very qualified franchise—that's what the whole thing is about", and also said that any settlement must be endorsed by a two-thirds majority of the existing House of Assembly (which was largely elected by white Rhodesians). In mid 1977 he continued to warn that insistence on capitulation to the Patriotic Front would produce a white backlash and put negotiations back.

However, the Rhodesian government was forced to put its internal settlement negotiations on hold during a joint US-UK initiative in late 1977. Van der Byl's public comments seemed to be aimed at ensuring this mission did not succeed, as he insisted that it had no chance of negotiating a ceasefire, described the Carter administration as "mindless", and the joint mission as being "Anglo-American-Russian". When a plan was published, he described it as "totally outrageous" and involving "the imposition of unconditional surrender on an undefeated people who are not enemies".

=== Internal settlement ===
The mission did fail and the internal settlement talks were resurrected, resulting in a deal on 4 March 1978. A transitional joint Council of Ministers was set up, with Van der Byl having to work with Dr Elliott Gabellah as his co-Minister of Foreign Affairs. The Patriotic Front took no notice of this accord and the guerrilla war continued; Lord Richard Cecil, a close family friend working as a photo-journalist, was killed by guerrillas on 20 April 1978 after Van der Byl had ensured he had full access to military areas denied to other reporters.

In May Van der Byl greeted news of massacres in Zaire as "a blessing in disguise" because they might ensure that warnings about Soviet penetration in Africa were heeded. He denounced the British government the following month for refusing to recognise that a massacre of Elim missionaries was perpetrated by the Patriotic Front. As the date for the full implementation of the internal settlement grew nearer, Van der Byl's profile decreased, but he remained active in politics: he was elected unopposed for the whites-only Gatooma/Hartley seat to the Zimbabwe-Rhodesia House of Assembly. He handed over power to his African successor on 1 June 1979, and became instead Minister of Transport and Power and Minister of Posts in the new government.

=== Lancaster House ===
When "the wheels came off the wagon" (as he put it) at Lancaster House in 1979, Van der Byl greeted the event with amused detachment. He was not a member of any delegation at the conference and did not attend. The weekend after the agreement, he called on the Rhodesian Front to revitalise itself as the only true representative of Europeans in Rhodesia, and he ascribed the result of the conference to "a succession of perfidious British governments".

According to Ian Smith's memoirs, Van der Byl organised a meeting between Ian Smith and Lieutenant-General Peter Walls, Commander of the Rhodesian Army, shortly before the first Zimbabwean elections in February 1980, where they agreed a strategy to prevent Robert Mugabe winning. They met again on 26 February the day before polling began in the Common Roll election. The consensus at this meeting was that Abel Muzorewa's interim government would win enough seats, when put together with the 20 seats reserved for whites which were all Rhodesian Front, to deny Mugabe victory. However, the early election results in March dented this confidence.

Smith asked Walls for details of his plan ("Operation Quartz") for resisting ZANU-PF taking power by force if it lost the election. Walls insisted that ZANU-PF would not win the election, and that ZANU's illegal and massive intimidation of voters showed it would continue this behavior if it lost. When ZANU won, both Smith and Van der Byl believed ZANU's atrocities had invalidated its victory, and that the Army should step in to prevent Mugabe taking over. Walls took the view that it was already too late, and while the others wished for some move, they were forced to concede to this view.

=== In Zimbabwe ===
Van der Byl had been elected unopposed to the new House of Assembly for Gatooma/Hartley and remained a close associate of Smith, becoming vice-president of the 'Republican Front' (later renamed the Conservative Alliance of Zimbabwe). At the 1985 general election the boundaries for the White Roll seats were altered and Van der Byl fought in Mount Pleasant, opposing Chris Andersen. Andersen had broken with the Rhodesian Front to sit as an independent and became Minister of State for the Public Service in Robert Mugabe's government. Van der Byl lost the election heavily, polling only 544 votes to 1,017 for Andersen and 466 for a third candidate. The Conservative Alliance of Zimbabwe still controlled the election of ten white Senators and Smith agreed to elect Van der Byl to one of the Senate seats.

Parliamentary seats reserved for whites were abolished in 1987. Van der Byl made his last speech in Parliament on 10 September, in which he praised Robert Mugabe for the "absolute courtesy" he had shown since independence. He noted that he was the last surviving member of the 1965 government remaining in Parliament, and declared he hoped "I would have been cherished .. as a sort of national monument, and not flung into the political wilderness". His speech loudly denounced the former Republican Front and Conservative Alliance of Zimbabwe members who had gone over to the government, describing them as "dreadful souls screaming in agony". The government minister Dr Edson Zvobgo responded with a poem referring to the number of rebels killed fighting troops under Van der Byl's command.

== Marriage, issue and retirement ==
On 31 August 1979 at Schloss Waldstein in Deutschfeistritz, Austria, Van der Byl married Princess Charlotte Maria Benedikte Eleonore Adelheid of Liechtenstein. She was thirty years his junior, the daughter of Prince Heinrich of Liechtenstein and granddaughter of Karl I, the last emperor of Austria. The couple had three sons: Pieter Vincenz, Valerian, and Casimir.

In 1983 Van der Byl had inherited from his mother a property described as "the magnificent estate .. near Caledon in the Western Cape," and following the end of his political career had no need to keep a home in Zimbabwe, so he quit the place. He left as a rich man, with an attractive young wife, and enjoyed his retirement. He frequently visited London, where he was a good friend of Viscount Cranborne, who put him up for membership of the Turf Club. Both were members of White's Club and were often seen there when Van der Byl was in town.

Four days after his 76th birthday, Van der Byl died at Fairfield, in Caledon, Western Cape. In his obituary, Dan van der Vat wrote "The arrival of majority rule in South Africa made no difference, and he died a very wealthy man."

== Awards ==
- Legion of Merit (Grand Officer - Civilian) (GLM)
- Independence Decoration (ID)

Political offices
Preceded by Jack Howman	Minister of Information, Immigration and Tourism; 1968–1974	Succeeded by Wickus de Kock
Preceded by Jack Howman	Minister of Defence; 1974–1976	Succeeded by Reginald Cowper
Preceded by Jack Howman	Minister of Foreign Affairs; 1974–1979; With: Elliott Gabellah 1978–1979	Succeeded by David Mukome
Preceded by Reginald Cowper	Minister of the Public Service; 1976–1978	Succeeded by Hilary Squires
Preceded by Elly Broomberg	Minister of Information, Immigration and Tourism; 1977–1979; With: Elliott Gabellah 1978–1979	Succeeded by Silas Mundawarara
Preceded by William Irvine	Minister of Transport and Power; 1979	Vacant (during Lord Soames' Governorship) Title next held by Ernest Kadungure from April 1980
Preceded by James Chikerema and William Irvine	Minister of Posts; 1979	Vacant (during Lord Soames' Governorship) Title next held by George Silundika from April 1980
