= Ahrn Palley =

Rhodesian politician (1914–1993)

Ahrn Palley (13 February 1914 – 6 May 1993) was an independent politician in Rhodesia who criticised the Smith administration and the Unilateral Declaration of Independence. Ian Smith described him as "one of the most able politicians this country has produced, and although our political philosophies did not coincide, we always respected one another and maintained friendly relations."

== Background ==
Palley was born in Cape Town, Cape Province, Union of South Africa, and was Jewish. He was educated at the University of London where he trained in paediatrics, and went into practice in his native city. In the early 1950s, he decided on a change of career and country, retraining as a lawyer and emigrating to Southern Rhodesia. Palley proved an effective advocate and a good legal brain. He was offered the chance to become a judge in both Rhodesia and South Africa, but refused because of the existence of capital punishment to which he had a principled objection.

== Entry into politics ==
In the 1958 general election, he was elected for the opposition Dominion Party in the Greendale District, which consisted of white suburbs of the capital city Salisbury. The Dominion Party sought the break-up of the Federation of Rhodesia and Nyasaland and the re-establishment of Southern Rhodesia as a separate independent Dominion within the Commonwealth, and Palley supported these aims. However, he grew out of sympathy with the majority of the party which sought to delay moves to majority rule.

== Political stances ==
Palley split with the Dominion Party early in 1959 and sat instead as an independent member (he briefly formed his own party which he called the Southern Rhodesia Party). He supported moves towards increasing African involvement in government, and making an issue of opposing attempts to increase police powers. In 1960, Palley attracted headlines by making an all-night filibuster against the United Federal Party government's Law and Order Maintenance Act. Although the UFP was publicly committed to increasing African involvement in public affairs, Palley was not in the least tempted to support them. According to James Barber, author of Rhodesia: The Road to Rebellion, Palley believed that the UFP lacked any real commitment to giving Africans political power. On 22 July 1960, he also spoke against the UFP's attempts to pursue support from Africans which he considered desultory to increase their political power. Palley took the view that it was wholly unrealistic for the UFP to think that the two races could be united in the same party. He also opposed the UFP's decision to use tribal chiefs as a way of involving Africans in government, describing it as a way to bypass Parliament.

== Re-election in 1962 ==
Palley joined Sir Garfield Todd's "New Africa Party" in 1961, although he did not remain a member for long. His support for increasing black African involvement in government attracted widescale opposition among the white electorate. Accordingly, in the 1962 general election Palley fought the Highfield Electoral District to the south-west of Salisbury. Despite a widespread boycott of the election, he defeated three other candidates to retain his seat and become the only Independent candidate returned.

The election devastated the UFP, which splintered, and Palley became the most effective voice speaking out against the governments of Winston Field and Ian Smith when they demanded independence on the basis of the 1962 constitution. Palley's district included some black African townships, and the government's crackdown on the nationalist groups in 1964 led to an outbreak of violence there and the declaration of a state of emergency. Palley disagreed with the suggestion of detaining troublemakers in camps; he agreed that the excess residents living in the overcrowded townships should be moved, but he urged that they be provided with areas in which it was fit to live. He said of the Rhodesian Front government officers that they had "certain philosophies for community development, but they have in fact no plans at all."

== UDI ==
Palley was re-elected in the 1965 general election, described as "a remarkable demonstration of political survival" as the Rhodesian Front won a landslide victory and Palley was the only white opposition member. On 25 November 1965 the Legislative Assembly met following the Unilateral Declaration of Independence. He raised an immediate point of order in protest at the government's declaration, saying, "Certain Honourable Members in collusion have torn up the constitution under which this House meets. The proceedings have no legal validity whatsoever." After the speaker, Rubidge Stumbles, declared his support, Palley kept rising to raise points of order and eventually was ordered to leave the chamber, which he refused to do and had to be forcibly removed by the sergeant-at-arms, while shouting "This is an illegal assembly! God save the Queen!"

Throughout the Parliament, Palley kept up his opposition to the government's stance on both security and the constitution. Ian Smith described him as "a one man opposition party". When given the opportunity in 1966 to instigate his own debate, he put down a motion opposing the idea of Rhodesia becoming a republic, at intervals refusing to recognise the authority of Clifford Dupont who had been appointed as "Officer Administering the Government" to replace the Governor. He urged acceptance of British terms under which it would recognise Rhodesia as independent in 1968 by describing them as the best deal Rhodesia could hope for.

== Later career ==
In 1969 the Rhodesian government decided to hold a referendum on a new constitution which declared Rhodesia a republic. Palley attacked the government for letting a small faction outside Parliament decide its policy. However, the referendum was successful in 1970 and the new constitution changed the basis for the electoral system, depriving Palley of the chance of re-election in the general election that followed.

In the 1974 election, Palley challenged the Rhodesian Front in the Salisbury City constituency, which contained the most non-European voters. He came in only three votes behind, the nearest the RF came to losing any of the upper-roll constituencies during the period of UDI. During the Lancaster House talks in 1979, Palley acted as legal adviser to Abel Muzorewa's United African National Council.

== In Zimbabwe ==
After Rhodesia gained recognised independence under majority rule as Zimbabwe in 1980, Palley argued that meaningful land reform would not be as expensive as some were suggesting because the government had previously been subsidising farmers, and therefore ordinary commercial procedures would make land available to Africans. In 1981, he urged Robert Mugabe's Zimbabwe African National Union - Patriotic Front party to fight the seats reserved for European voters, arguing that there was considerable support for him there.

Palley remained at work both in medicine and law until his sudden death (of a heart attack). He had never been in good health through his political career, and had a colostomy at the age of 24. Palley married his wife Claire in 1952; they separated in the early 1960s and divorced in 1985. Claire Palley is a leading South African academic specialising in foreign affairs who was United Kingdom representative to the United Nations Sub-Commission on Prevention of Discrimination and Protection of Minorities from 1988 to 1998 and Constitutional Consultant to the President of Cyprus from 1980 to 2004. They had five sons.

Southern Rhodesian Legislative Assembly
| Preceded by Geoffrey Ellman-Brown | Member of Parliament for Greendale; 1958 – 1962 | Succeeded by Mark Partridge |
| New constituency | Member of Parliament for Highfield; 1962 – 1970 | Assembly dissolved |
