= Rubidge Stumbles =

Southern Rhodesian lawyer and politician

Albert Rubidge Washington Stumbles, GLM, ICD (20 January 1904 – 2 August 1978) was a Southern Rhodesian lawyer and politician. After serving as a minister under Garfield Todd and Edgar Whitehead, Stumbles became the Speaker of the Legislative Assembly of Southern Rhodesia (House of Assembly from 1970) in 1964, a post he held until 1972. As Speaker, Stumbles is best remembered for his acceptance of Southern Rhodesia's Unilateral Declaration of Independence in 1965.

== Biography ==
Stumbles was born in Fort Beaufort, Cape Colony, the son of Robert Washington Stumbles, a bank manager and a distant relative of George Washington. In 1913, he moved with his family from Bloemfontein to Southern Rhodesia, where they settled in Bulawayo. He was educated at the Milton High School in Bulawayo and St. Andrew's School, Bloemfontein. After a short spell in the Southern Rhodesian civil service as a clerk, Stumbles was admitted to practice law in Southern Rhodesia in 1926. He moved with his parents to Salisbury in 1928, where he continued his legal practice.

In the 1946 Southern Rhodesian general election, Stumbles entered the Legislative Assembly of Southern Rhodesia for Avondale as a member of the Liberal Party, but he was defeated in 1948. He was returned to the Assembly unopposed for Avondale in 1953 as a member of Garfield Todd's United Rhodesia Party, which became the United Federal Party in 1957. Stumbles was appointed Minister of Justice and Internal Affairs in 1954, Minister of Local Government and Minister of Native Education in 1957, Minister of Roads, Irrigation and Lands in 1958, and Minister of Justice and Internal Affairs, Minister of Law and Order, and Minister of Roads in 1962. In 1958, he and his Cabinet colleagues resigned in order to oust Todd, whose moderate native policy alienated them.

Having previously served as Deputy Speaker and Chairman of the Committees, Stumbles was elected Speaker of the Legislative Assembly in 1964, whereupon he resigned his seat. As Speaker, his most momentous decision was his recognition of the legitimacy of Rhodesia's Unilateral Declaration of Independence in 1965. The United Kingdom government had passed an order-in-council which forbade the Legislative Assembly from meeting after 11 November, but Stumbles, a supporter of UDI, decided to ignore the prohibition.

When the Assembly met again on 25 November, Stumbles ruled that those members who considered themselves bound by the British order-in-council forbidding the sitting should not be present at all. When Dr Ahrn Palley, an opponent of UDI, opposed the ruling, Stumbles named him and he was excluded from the Assembly.

== Awards ==
- Legion of Merit (Grand Officer - Civilian) (GLM)
- Independence Commemorative Decoration (ICD)

== Family ==
Stumbles married Mary Dallas Atherstone, a descendant of the 1820 Settlers, in 1932. They had two sons, Robert Atherstone Stumbles (1934–2010) and James Rubidge Washington Stumbles (born 1939).

Robert Stumbles was a prominent Zimbabwean lawyer and opponent of racial discrimination; as Chancellor of the Diocese of Harare, Stumbles became famous for his attempts to bring to trial the disgraced Bishop of Harare, Nolbert Kunonga.

Southern Rhodesian Legislative Assembly
Preceded by Harry Bertin	Member of Parliament for Avondale; 1946 – 1948	Succeeded by Dendy Young
Preceded by Dendy Young	Member of Parliament for Avondale; 1954 – 1964	Succeeded by Jack Pithey
Preceded by Walter Alexander	Speaker of the Legislative Assembly; 1964 – 1970	Assembly dissolved
Political offices
Preceded by Garfield Todd as Minister of Internal Affairs and Justice	Minister of Justice and Internal Affairs; 1954 – 1958	Succeeded by Alan Lloyd
Preceded by Geoffrey Ellman-Brown as Minister of Local Government and Housing	Minister of Local Government; 1957	Succeeded by Geoffrey Ellman-Brown
Preceded by Garfield Todd	Minister of Native Education; 1957	Succeeded by Ralph Drew Palmer
Preceded by Geoffrey Ellman-Brown as Minister of Roads and Road Traffic; Minister of Irrigation	Minister of Roads, Irrigation and Lands; 1958 – 1962	Succeeded by Geoffrey Ellman-Brown as Minister of Roads and Road Traffic; Minister of Irrigation
Preceded by Sir George Davenport as Minister of Mines, Lands and Surveys	Minister of Roads, Irrigation and Lands; 1958 – 1962	Succeeded by Herbert Jack Quinton as Minister of Lands and Natural Resources
Preceded by Reginald Knight	Minister of Justice and Internal Affairs; 1962	Succeeded by Blair Vincent Ewing as Minister of Internal Affairs
Preceded by Reginald Knight	Minister of Justice and Internal Affairs; 1962	Succeeded by Himself as Minister of Justice; Minister of Law and Order
Preceded by Himself as Minister of Justice and Internal Affairs	Minister of Justice; Minister of Law and Order; 1962	Succeeded by Clifford Dupont
House of Assembly of Rhodesia
New title	Speaker of the House of Assembly; 1970 – 1972	Succeeded by George Holland Hartley
