= Ministry of Education (Rhodesia) =

Ministry of Education of Rhodesia
- Coat of arms of Rhodesia

Department overview
- Formed: 11 November 1965; 60 years ago
- Dissolved: 1 June 1979; 47 years ago
- Headquarters: Salisbury, Salisbury Province

The Ministry of Education was a government ministry of Rhodesia from the country's independence in 1965 to 1979, when the country transitioned from white minority rule to the current republic of Zimbabwe.

First established in 1948, with the establishment of the Federation of Rhodesia and Nyasaland the responsibility for non-african and higher education was a federal responsibility from 1954 to 1963. In 1956 Prime Minister Garfield Todd established the Ministry of Native Education, with the responsibility for black African education, which was later renamed the Ministry for African Education from 1962. The Ministry of African Education was abolished by Prime Minister Ian Smith in 1964.

== List of ministers ==
=== Education ===
№	Name	Took office	Left office	Political party	Prime Minister	Title
1	Hugh Beadle	23 April 1948	20 July 1950	United Rhodesia Party	Sir Godfrey Huggins	Minister of Health and Education
2	George Arthur Davenport	20 July 1950	7 September 1953	United Rhodesia Party	Sir Godfrey Huggins	Minister of Education
2	George Arthur Davenport	7 September 1953	5 February 1954	United Federal Party	Garfield Todd	Minister of Education
Non-African and Higher Education responsibility of the Federation, 1954–1963 (see list)
3	John Wrathall	1 January 1964	14 April 1964	Rhodesian Front	Winston Field	Minister of Education
4	A. P. Smith	14 April 1964	1977	Rhodesian Front	Ian Smith	Minister of Education
5	Denis Walker	1977	27 December 1978	Rhodesian Front	Ian Smith	Minister of Education
−	Gibson Magaramombe (co-minister)	27 December 1978	1 June 1979	Zimbabwe United People's Organisation	Ian Smith	Minister of Education
6	Rowan Cronjé	27 December 1978	1 June 1979	Rhodesian Front	Ian Smith	Minister of Education

=== Native/African education ===
№	Name	Took office	Left office	Political party	Prime Minister	Title
1	Garfield Todd	1 February 1956	4 October 1957	United Federal Party	Garfield Todd	Minister of Native Education
2	Rubidge Stumbles	4 October 1957	17 January 1958	United Federal Party	Garfield Todd	Minister of Native Education
2	Ralph Drew Palmer	17 January 1958	17 February 1958	United Federal Party	Garfield Todd	Minister of Native Education
3	Cyril Hatty	17 February 1958	11 June 1958	United Federal Party	Edgar Whitehead	Minister of Native Education
4	Ralph Milton Cleveland	11 June 1958	24 September 1962	United Federal Party	Edgar Whitehead	Minister of Native Education
–	Cyril Hatty	24 September 1962	17 December 1962	United Federal Party	Edgar Whitehead	Minister of African Education
5	Jack Howman	17 December 1962	11 October 1963	Rhodesian Front	Winston Field	Minister of African Education
6	John Wrathall	11 October 1963	14 May 1964	Rhodesian Front	Winston Field	Minister of African Education
