= Reginald Knight =

Southern Rhodesian politician and judge (died 1969)

Reginald Knight (died 1969) was a Southern Rhodesian politician and judge.

Born in Wanstead, Essex, Knight was educated at Mill Hill School and the University of London. He was called to the English bar by the Middle Temple in 1930. From 1940 to 1945, Knight served in the Royal Air Force.

Emigrating to Southern Rhodesia after the war, Knight was called to its bar in 1947. He was appointed a KC in 1951. He was elected to the Legislative Assembly of Southern Rhodesia in 1954. In 1958, he was appointed to the cabinet, and served as Minister of Justice and Minister of Internal Affairs. In 1962, he left politics and became a judge of the Water Court, eventually becoming its senior judge. He was also president of the Court of Appeal for Native Civil Cases. He died in service in 1969.

According to John Redgment, Knight was an indecisive judge and left a large backlog in the water court at his death.
