= Ministry of Finance (Rhodesia) =

Ministry of Finance of Rhodesia
- Coat of arms of Rhodesia

Department overview
- Formed: 11 November 1965; 60 years ago
- Dissolved: 1 June 1979; 47 years ago
- Superseding Department: Ministry of Finance of Zimbabwe
- Headquarters: Salisbury

The Ministry of Finance was a cabinet ministry of the government of Rhodesia. It was responsible for overseeing the nation's public finances.

The Ministry of Finance was established during the colonial period of Southern Rhodesia, first as the office of Treasurer in 1923. The office was renamed as Minister of Treasury from June 1954 to April 1964. The office retained the same structure when Rhodesia unilaterally declared independence in 1965.

== Ministers of Finance before UDI ==
- Percival Donald Leslie Fynn, July 1933 - September 1933
- Jacob Hendrik Smit, September 1933 - 1942
  - Percival Donald Leslie Fynn, January 1935 – April 1937, acting
  - William Sydney Senior, April 1937 – July 1939, acting
  - Ernest Lucas Guest, July 1939 – December 1941, acting
  - Godfrey Martin Huggins, December 1941 - 1942, acting
- Godfrey Martin Huggins, January 1942 - February 1942
- Max Danziger, February 1942 - May 1946
  - Godfrey Martin Huggins, December 1942 – June 1945, acting
  - Leslie Benjamin Fereday, June 1945 – May 1946, acting
- Ernest Lucas Guest, May 1946 - September 1946
  - Godfrey Martin Huggins, September 1946, acting
- Edgar Cuthbert Fremantle Whitehead, September 1946 - 1953
  - Ernest Lucas Guest, March 1947 - November 1947, acting
  - Patrick Bissett Fletcher, November 1947 – August 1949, acting
  - Godfrey Martin Huggins, August 1949 – September 1950, acting
  - Patrick Bissett Fletcher, September 1950 – June 1951, acting
  - Godfrey Martin Huggins, June 1951 – January 1952, acting
  - Patrick Bissett Fletcher, January 1952 - April 1952, acting
  - John Moore Caldicott, April 1952 – January 1953, acting
  - George Arthur Davenport, January 1953 - September 1953, acting
- Donald MacIntyre, September 1953 - December 1953
- Reginald Stephen Garfield Todd, December 1953 - February 1954
- Cyril James Hatty, June 1954 - December 1954, Minister of Treasury
- George Arthur Davenport, December 1954 – August 1955, acting Minister of Treasury
- Patrick Bissett Fletcher, August 1955 – December 1956, acting Minister of Treasury
- Reginald Stephen Garfield Todd, December 1956 – October 1957, acting Minister of Treasury
- Geoffrey Ellman Brown, October 1957 – January 1958, acting Minister of Treasury
- Abraham Eliezer Abrahamson, January 1958 - February 1958, Minister of Treasury
- Cyril James Hatty, February 1958 - August 1959, Minister of Treasury
- Edgar Cuthbert Fremantle Whitehead, August 1959 – September 1962, acting Minister of Treasury
- Geoffrey Ellman Brown, September 1962 - December 1962, Minister of Treasury
- Ian Douglas Smith, December 1962 - October 1963, Minister of Treasury
- William John Harper, October 1963 – April 1964, acting Minister of Treasury
- John Wrathall, April 1964 − November 1965

== Ministers of Finance after UDI ==
- John Wrathall, November 1965 − January 1976
- David Colville Smith, January 1976 − June 1979
- Ernest Bulle, April 1978 – June 1979

== Ministers of Finance of Rhodesia and Nyasaland ==
- Donald MacIntyre, 1953-1962
- John Moore Caldicott, 1962-1963
