= Blair Vincent Ewing =

Southern Rhodesian politician (1928–1995)

Minister of Justice and Internal Affairs
- In office 16 November 1962 – 17 December 1962
- Prime Minister: Edgar Whitehead
- Preceded by: Rubidge Stumbles
- Succeeded by: Jack Howman

M.P, Southern Rhodesia, Lomagundi.
- In office 5 June 1958 – August 1963
- Prime Minister: Edgar Whitehead

Personal details
- Born: 10 July 1928 Southern Rhodesia
- Died: 22 December 1995 (aged 67) Zimbabwe
- Party: United Federal Party

Blair Vincent Ewing (10 July 1928 – 22 December 1995) was a Southern Rhodesia politician.

== Career ==
He won election to Parliament in 1958 at age 29, making him the country's youngest M.P. Ewing served as a M.P for Lomagundi, beating Dominion Party candidate Frank Clements. Ewing helped oversee the construction of Kariba Dam, and was one of the last people to travel down the Zambezi before its completion.

He served as M.P on the Select Committee on Resettlement of Natives.

Ewing served as an M.P until he resigned from Parliament on 4 August 1964, due to the growing popularity of the Rhodesian Front.

Ewing served as Minister of Justice and Internal Affairs (also known as Cabinet Minister of Native Affairs and District Administration) under the United Federal Party, from 16 November 1962, to 17 December 1962.

He sought to repeal the Land Apportionment Act but was blocked by his own party. Following the U.F.P's defeat by the Rhodesian Front in the 1962 election, he continued to serve as a M.P for another year before leaving politics in August 1963 due to accepting a post at an 'Efficiency Firm', requiring him to leave Parliament.
