= Jack Howman =

Rhodesian politician (1919–2000)

Jack Howman GLM ID
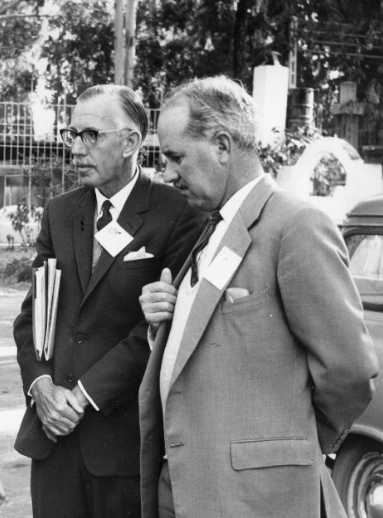
- Jack Howman, right, attending a conference before signing of the U.D.I.

Personal details
- Born: John Hartley Howman; 11 August 1919 Selukwe, Southern Rhodesia
- Died: 2 February 2000 (aged 80) Johannesburg, South Africa
- Party: Rhodesian Front
- Spouse: Moira Maidman

John Hartley "Jack" Howman GLM ID (August 11, 1919 – 2 February 2002) was a Rhodesian politician, under the Rhodesian Front, and a signatory of the Unilateral Declaration of Independence, and served in the Rhodesian Cabinet.

Jack Howman served in various cabinet positions, even holding three ministerial positions in 1963, in the Ministry of Internal Affairs, Local Government, and African Education. While serving as the Minister of Justice and Internal Affairs he debated in the Southern Rhodesian Parliament on several bills, such as the Land Apportionment Bill on the 18th August 1963. He was considered one of Ian Smith's closest friends, and accompanied him to the Gibraltar Conferences in 1966 and 1968.

Howman also served as the Minister of Foreign Affairs, Minister of Tourism and Information, Minister of African Education, and Minister of External Affairs and Defence.

== Awards ==
- Legion of Merit (Grand Officer - Civilian) (GLM) (Rhodesia)
- Independence Decoration (ID) (Rhodesia)

Southern Rhodesian Legislative Assembly
New title	Member of Parliament for Jameson; 1962 – 1970	Parliament dissolved
House of Assembly of Rhodesia
New title	Member of Parliament for Mount Pleasant; 1970 – 1974	Succeeded by Jonas Christian Andersen
Political offices
Preceded by Blair Vincent Ewing	Minister of Internal Affairs; 1962 – 1964	Succeeded by William Harper
Preceded by Blair Vincent Ewing	Minister of Local Government; 1962 – 1964	Succeeded by John Gaunt
Preceded by Cyril Hatty	Minister of African Education; 1962 – 1963	Succeeded by John Wrathall
New title	Minister of Information, Immigration, and Tourism; 1965 – 1968	Succeeded by P. K. van der Byl
Preceded by The Duke of Montrose	Minister of Foreign Affairs; Minister of Defence; 1968 – 1974	Succeeded by P. K. van der Byl
Preceded by William Harper	Minister of the Public Service; 1968 – 1974	Succeeded by Reginald Cowper
