= Ian Finlay McLean =

Rhodesian politician

Ian Finlay McLean, ID (born April 1919) was a Rhodesian politician.

Born in Bulawayo, McLean was educated at Milton School. He enlisted in the Royal Air Force in 1941 and was commissioned as a pilot officer in 1942 and saw extensive service. He was elected as an MP for Bulawayo North in 1958 and for Queen's Park in 1962. He served as Minister of Health, and was a signatory of Rhodesia's 1965 unilateral declaration of independence. He also served as Minister of Labour and Social Welfare.
