= Winston Field =

Seventh Prime Minister of Southern Rhodesia

The Honourable Winston Field CMG MBE
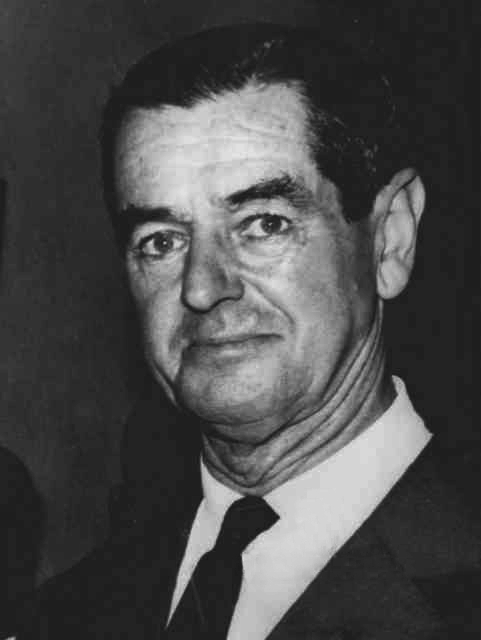

7th Prime Minister of Southern Rhodesia
- In office 17 December 1962 – 13 April 1964
- Monarch: Elizabeth II
- Governor: Sir Humphrey Gibbs
- Deputy: Ian Smith
- Preceded by: Edgar Whitehead
- Succeeded by: Ian Smith

Personal details
- Born: 6 June 1904 Bromsgrove, Worcestershire, United Kingdom
- Died: 17 March 1969 (aged 64) Salisbury, Rhodesia
- Party: Rhodesian Front
- Other political affiliations: Dominion Party

Military service
- Allegiance: United Kingdom; Southern Rhodesia
- Branch/service: Rhodesian Army; British Army
- Years of service: 1940–1945
- Rank: Major
- Battles/wars: Second World War; Normandy landings

Winston Joseph Field CMG MBE (6 June 1904 – 17 March 1969) was a British politician who served as the seventh Prime Minister of Southern Rhodesia. Field was a former Dominion Party MP who founded the Rhodesian Front political party with Ian Smith.

== Early life ==
Field was born and raised in Bromsgrove and attended Bromsgrove School as a day student, in Worcestershire, England, and moved to Southern Rhodesia at the age of 17 in 1921. A tobacco farmer near Marandellas (now known as Marondera), in Mashonaland East, Field was President of the powerful Rhodesian Tobacco Association from 1938 to 1940, when he left for military service during the Second World War.

Initially enlisting in the Rhodesian Forces as a sergeant, he was court-martialled and demoted to the rank of private for striking a subordinate. Field then transferred to the British Forces, joining the Worcestershire Regiment as a Second Lieutenant from 1941, served in the D-Day Normandy landings in 1944, and ended the war with the rank of Major in the 6th Durham Light Infantry.

== Early political career ==
Field was first elected to the Federation of Rhodesia and Nyasaland Federal Assembly for Mrewa in a 1957 by-election under the Dominion Party ticket. The Federation Minister of Justice, Julian Greenfield, found him "somewhat impulsive and opinionated but entirely straightforward".

When the Rhodesian Front was founded in early-1962 by Ian Smith and Douglas "Boss" Lilford; a very wealthy right-wing tobacco farmer, they needed an establishment figurehead and Field was chosen. He was a solid, trustworthy figure and no racist, even though "nearly everyone else in the new party was to the right of him". His wife said "he didn't really want to take it on, he wasn't really a political animal".

== Prime Minister of Southern Rhodesia ==
The "imperious and intolerant" Field was elected, to his and many others' surprise, as Rhodesia's first Rhodesian Front Prime Minister at the 1962 general election and served until he was replaced by Ian Smith in 1964. Field lent an air of respectability to the Rhodesian Front government, though his Cabinet was derided by one newspaper as "by no means an inspiring list". Broader afield, the Australian journal The Bulletin noted of Field that "those who know him best do not for a moment suppose that Winston Field has been slow to attract attention because he is personally diffident or lacking in character. On the contrary, they see him as a man of cold reserve, not softened by his past defeats, not at all intimidated by the terrible power over other men’s lives now put into his hands by the white voters of Southern Rhodesia."

At the time of Field's election, it was assumed that the UK would delay the process of independence for Rhodesia until "an African majority assumed power in Salisbury". Many in the Rhodesian Front felt that Field did not fight hard enough for independence, in particular that the British had hoodwinked him on visits to London in June 1963 and January 1964 over promises of independence. His relatively short tenure in office saw the dissolution of the Central African Federation on 31 December 1963, though he did win the majority of the Federation's military and other assets for Southern Rhodesia.

Field's Cabinet included John Gaunt, a former Federal MP for Lusaka and a former District Commissioner in Northern Rhodesia. Aware of discontent in Cabinet fomented by Gaunt, Field demanded his resignation in the spring of 1964. Gaunt asked him to wait over the weekend whilst he cleared up some matters in his office. In that time, Gaunt and Smith organised a plot against Field, now seen as ineffectual after his failure to win independence. Ken Flower, head of Rhodesia's Central Intelligence Organisation, an organisation Field had ordered be set up, had in fact warned him sometime previously there was a conspiracy against him, involving several of his ministers.

The caucus of the Rhodesian Front decided to ask for his resignation on 2 April 1964 and the decision was conveyed to Field the next day, though the formal demand was not made until a Cabinet meeting a few days later. Field was replaced as leader of the Rhodesian Front and as Prime Minister of Rhodesia by Ian Smith on 14 April 1964, despite the Governor Sir Humphrey Gibbs urging him to fight against the rebels in his party.

== Later life ==
Field retired from parliament at the May 1965 election, at which the Rhodesian Front under Ian Smith was returned with a greater majority, and was succeeded in his Marandellas seat by David Smith.

Field died at the age of 64 in Salisbury, Rhodesia, in 1969. On his death, Clifford Dupont, serving as Officer Administering the Government since Rhodesia's Unilateral Declaration of Independence on 11 November 1965, observed: "Some day the story will be told of how much this country owes to Mr. Winston Field, who devoted his whole life to the good of Rhodesia. I, myself, have lost a friend, and I join Rhodesians everywhere in mourning the passing of this great patriot."

== Honours ==
Retention of The Honourable for life.	19 May 1964
Companion of the Order of St Michael and St George (CMG)	QB 1962
Member of the Order of the British Empire (MBE; Military Division)	1944

Rhodesia and Nyasaland Federal Assembly
Preceded by Neville Barrett	Member of Federal Parliament for Mrewa; 1957 – 1962	Succeeded by
Southern Rhodesian Legislative Assembly
Preceded by Peter Heaton Grey	Member of Parliament for Marandellas; 1962 – 1965	Succeeded by David Smith
Political offices
Preceded by Sir Edgar Whitehead	Prime Minister of Southern Rhodesia; 1962 – 1964	Succeeded by Ian Smith
Preceded by Cyril Hatty	Minister of the Public Service; 1962 – 1964	Succeeded by William Harper
New title	Minister of External Affairs and Defence; 1964	Succeeded by Ian Smith
