= List of justices of the Supreme Court of Zimbabwe =

This article lists current and former justices of the Supreme Court of Zimbabwe.

== List of justices ==
=== All justices ===
The following table lists all former justices of the Supreme Court of Zimbabwe, including both chief justices and puisne justices. The list also includes former Rhodesian justices who remained on the bench after independence in 1980. For the Rhodesian justices, the appointment date indicates the date they were appointed to the High Court of Rhodesia, which was superseded by the Supreme Court of Zimbabwe. The start date of the Rhodesian justices' tenure, however, is 18 April 1980, the date that the Supreme Court of Zimbabwe came into being.

Justice	Appointed	Tenure	Appointed by	Ref.
Hector Macdonald*	1958	18 April 1980 – 30 April 1980 (Retired)	Edgar Whitehead	
Harry Elinder Davies	1964	18 April 1980 – 24 June 1980 (Retired)	Humphrey Gibbs	
John Vernon Radcliffe Lewis	1970	18 April 1980 – 1982 (Retired)	Clifford Dupont	
Bennie Goldin	8 May 1980	8 May 1980 – 1981 (Retired)	Canaan Banana	
Leo Baron	8 May 1980	8 May 1980 – 1983 (Retired)	Canaan Banana	
Charles Edward Lukin Beck	8 May 1980	8 May 1980 – ?	Canaan Banana	
Enoch Dumbutshena*	8 May 1980	8 May 1980 – 1990 (Retired)	Canaan Banana	
John Fieldsend*	May 1980	July 1980 – February 1983 (Resigned)	Canaan Banana	
Anthony Gubbay*	1983	1983 – 1 July 2001 (Resigned)	Canaan Banana	
Telford Georges*	February 1983	March 1983 – February 1984 (Retired)	Canaan Banana	
Nicholas McNally	1984	1984 – 31 December 2001 (Resigned)	Canaan Banana	
John Manyarara	January 1987	January 1987 – 1992 (Retired)	Canaan Banana	
Ahmed Ebrahim	1990	1990 – May 2002 (Retired)	Robert Mugabe	
Simbarashe Muchechetere	1992	1992 – 27 December 2001 (Died)	Robert Mugabe	
Wilson Sandura	1998	1998 – July 2011 (Retired)	Robert Mugabe	
Godfrey Chidyausiku*	March 2001	March 2001 – 28 February 2017 (Retired)	Robert Mugabe	
Misheck Cheda	July 2001	July 2001 – 2012 (Retired)	Robert Mugabe	
Vernanda Ziyambi	July 2001	July 2001 – 30 November 2016 (Retired)	Robert Mugabe	
Luke Malaba*	July 2001	July 2001 –	Robert Mugabe	
Elizabeth Gwaunza	2002	2002 –	Robert Mugabe	
Rita Makarau	2006	2006 – 20 May 2021 (Appointed to Constitutional Court)	Robert Mugabe	
Paddington Garwe	2010	2010 – 20 May 2021 (Appointed to Constitutional Court)	Robert Mugabe	
Yunus Omerjee (Acting)	2011	2011 – 4 April 2013 (Resigned)	Robert Mugabe	
Anne-Marie Gowora	November 2011	2 May 2012 – 20 May 2021 (Acting from 1 January 2012) (Appointed to Constitutional Court)	Robert Mugabe	
Ben Hlatshwayo	May 2013	22 May 2013 – 20 May 2021 (Appointed to Constitutional Court)	Robert Mugabe	
Bharat Patel	May 2013	22 May 2013 – 20 May 2021 (Appointed to Constitutional Court)	Robert Mugabe	
Antonia Guvava	November 2013	November 2013 –	Robert Mugabe	
Chinembiri Bhunu	16 September 2015	16 September 2015 –	Robert Mugabe	
Susan Mavangira	16 September 2015	16 September 2015 –	Robert Mugabe	
Tendai Uchena	16 September 2015	16 September 2015 –	Robert Mugabe	
Vernanda Ziyambi (Acting)	6 February 2017	6 February 2017 – 2 July 2019	Godfrey Chidyausiku	
Francis Bere	11 May 2018	11 May 2018 – 15 October 2020 (Removed)	Emmerson Mnangagwa	
Lavender Makoni	11 May 2018	11 May 2018 –	Emmerson Mnangagwa	
Charles Hungwe	26 June 2019	30 June 2019 –	Emmerson Mnangagwa	
Nicholas Mathonsi	26 June 2019	30 June 2019 –	Emmerson Mnangagwa	
Felistus Chatukuta	3 June 2021	3 June 2021 –	Emmerson Mnangagwa	
Alfas Chitakunye	3 June 2021	3 June 2021 –	Emmerson Mnangagwa	
George Chiweshe	3 June 2021	3 June 2021 –	Emmerson Mnangagwa	
Samuel Kudya	3 June 2021	3 June 2021 –	Emmerson Mnangagwa	
Joseph Musakwa	3 June 2021	3 June 2021 –	Emmerson Mnangagwa	
Hlekani Mwayera	3 June 2021	3 June 2021 –	Emmerson Mnangagwa	
*served as Chief Justice for all or part of their Supreme Court tenure
