= Anne-Marie Gowora =

Zimbabwean judge

Justice of the Supreme Court of Zimbabwe
- Incumbent
- Assumed office 2 May 2012 – Acting: 1 January 2012 – 2 May 2012
- Appointed by: Robert Mugabe

Judge of the High Court of Zimbabwe
- In office 21 December 2000 – 1 January 2012
- Appointed by: Robert Mugabe

Personal details
- Education: University of Rhodesia (LL.B)
- Profession: Judge; lawyer

Anne-Marie Gowora is a Zimbabwean judge who currently serves as a justice of the Supreme Court of Zimbabwe since 2012. Previously, she served on the High Court of Zimbabwe beginning in 2000.

== Education ==
Gowora attended the University of Rhodesia (today the University of Zimbabwe), where she studied law in a multiracial class of 38 students, including whites, blacks, Coloureds, and Indians. Among her former law classmates are prominent Harare lawyer George Chikumbirike, and judges Ishmael Chatikobo, Moses Chinhengo, and Jacqueline Pratt. Gowora graduated in 1979 with a Bachelor of Laws.

== Legal career ==
Before becoming a judge, Gowora spent much of her career working in the office of the Attorney General. At the time she was appointed to the High Court bench, she was a partner in a private law firm. In 2000, President Robert Mugabe appointed her to the High Court of Zimbabwe, along with three others, including Rita Makarau, her former law firm partner. However, University of Bordeaux professor Daniel Compagnon described her as an "undeniably pro-ZANU–PF judge," noting that she received a farm in October 2005 as a result of Zimbabwe's land reform program.

In November 2011, Gowora was named acting justice of the Supreme Court of Zimbabwe, with effect from 1 January 2012. Later that year, President Mugabe appointed her Supreme Court justice. She was sworn in, alongside High Court appointee Happias Zhou, on 2 May 2012 at State House in a ceremony attended by Chief Justice Godfrey Chidyausiku, Justice Minister Patrick Chinamasa, Supreme Court Justice Rita Makarau, among other public officials. Acting Justice Yunus Omerjee was also supposed to be sworn in that day, but he was out of the country. In 2013, Gowora was appointed to the Constitutional Court of Zimbabwe, which is part of the Supreme Court.

== See also ==
- List of first women lawyers and judges in Africa
- List of justices of the Supreme Court of Zimbabwe
