= Bennie Goldin =

The Honourable Bennie Goldin QC

Judge of Appeal of the Appellate Division of the High Court of Zimbabwe
- In office 8 May 1980 – 1981
- Appointed by: Canaan Banana

Justice of the High Court of Rhodesia
- In office 1964–1980

Personal details
- Born: 5 August 1918 Nesvizh, Byelorussia (now Belarus)
- Died: 20 March 2003 (aged 84)
- Spouse: Hancy Goldin
- Children: Jonathan Goldin, Robert Goldin and Barbara Weinberg
- Education: University of Cape Town (BA, LL.B)
- Occupation: Lawyer, judge

Military service
- Allegiance: South Africa
- Branch/service: Union Defence Force
- Battles/wars: World War II

Bennie Goldin QC (5 August 1918 – 20 March 2003) was a Byelorussian-born, Zimbabwean lawyer and judge. He was a justice of the Supreme Court of Zimbabwe from 1980 to 1981. Previously, he served on the High Court of Rhodesia from 1964 to 1980. Born in Nesvizh, Byelorussia (now Belarus), he grew up in Cape Town (South Africa), immigrated to Salisbury (Southern Rhodesia) ( as it then was) after World War II, and later returned in 1981 to Cape Town where he served as a judge in Transkei.

== Early life, education, and military service ==
Goldin was born in Belarus, on 5 August 1918. His family moved to South Africa before World war Two, He attended Sea Point Boy's High School in Cape Town before attending the University of Cape Town, where he received his Bachelor of Arts and Bachelor of Laws. He entered South Africa's Union Defence Force during World War II, serving in Italy and North Africa.

== Legal career ==
After demobilisation, Goldin emigrated from South Africa to Southern Rhodesia. There, he was called to the bar in the capital, Salisbury, and began practising law. He became a judge in 1960 when he was appointed to the Valuations Court of Southern Rhodesia. In 1962, he was named to the Southern Rhodesian Military Pensions Appeal Circuit. He became a Queen's Counsel, In addition, he was leader of the Rhodesian bar from 1962 to 1965. He served on both the Valuations Court and the Military Pensions Appeal Circuit until 1964, when he became a justice of the High Court of Rhodesia.

Like the entire Rhodesian judiciary, Goldin faced a dilemma regarding the illegality of Rhodesia's Unilateral Declaration of Independence (UDI) in 1965. He later wrote about the experience of the Rhodesian judges (including himself), "When faced with a distinct likelihood of a declaration of independence, they were obviously concerned about it as judges and citizens." Though Goldin was sympathetic to both Governor Sir Humphrey Gibbs and Chief Justice Sir Hugh Beadle, he strongly disagreed with Beadle's eventual recognition of the Rhodesian government's claims of sovereignty. In 1973, Goldin heard the appeal of Peter Niesewand, a Rhodesian journalist convicted for "revealing official secrets." The High Court reversed his conviction, with Goldin and Justice Hector Macdonald concurring with the opinion written by Chief Justice Beadle.

The white Rhodesian government ended with Zimbabwe's independence in April 1980. On 8 May 1980, Goldin was appointed, effective immediately, to the Supreme Court of Zimbabwe, which superseded the Rhodesian High Court. He sat on the Supreme Court until 1981, when he retired and moved back to South Africa. There, he became a judge on the Supreme Court of Transkei, one of the bantustans, or unrecognised "states" within South Africa set up for black inhabitants. He died in 2003.

== Personal life and honours ==
Goldin was Jewish. He and his wife, Hancy, lived in Salisbury (today Harare), where they were active members of their synagogue.

In 1990, he published a book, The Judge, the Prince, and the Usurper – from UDI to Zimbabwe.

Professor Michael Gelfand was a close friend with whom he co-authored several books including "African Law and Custom" which dealt with Shona law. Other books he published were: "Unhappy Marriage and Divorce" and "In and Out of Marriage".

== See also ==
- List of justices of the Supreme Court of Zimbabwe
