= Constitution of Zimbabwe Amendment (No. 2) Act, 2021 =

Parliament of Zimbabwe
- Long title: Constitution of Zimbabwe Amendment (No. 2) Act, 2021
- Citation: Act No. 2 of 2021
- Territorial extent: Zimbabwe
- Passed by: National Assembly of Zimbabwe
- Passed: 15 April 2021
- Passed by: Senate of Zimbabwe
- Passed: 5 May 2021
- Signed by: Emmerson Mnangagwa
- Signed: 7 May 2021
- Effective: 8 May 2021 (publication in Government Gazette)

Legislative history

Initiating chamber: National Assembly of Zimbabwe
- Bill title: Constitution of Zimbabwe Amendment (No. 2) Bill
- Introduced by: Minister of Justice, Legal and Parliamentary Affairs
- Introduced: Gazetted December 2019; revived April 2021
- Committee responsible: Portfolio Committee on Justice, Legal and Parliamentary Affairs
- Second reading: 14 April 2021
- Third reading: 15 April 2021

Revising chamber: Senate of Zimbabwe
- Bill title: Constitution of Zimbabwe Amendment (No. 2) Bill
- Third reading: 5 May 2021
- Voting summary: 65 voted for; 10 voted against

Final stages
- Senate of Zimbabwe amendments considered by the National Assembly of Zimbabwe: 15 April 2021 (National Assembly Committee Stage)
- Finally passed both chambers: 5 May 2021

Amends
- Constitution of Zimbabwe (2013)

Related legislation
- Constitution of Zimbabwe Amendment (No. 1) Act, 2017

Summary
- Amended the Constitution to remove the running-mate system for Vice-Presidents (allowing presidential appointment), modify judicial appointment and promotion procedures (removing mandatory public interviews for promotions), revise judicial tenure, introduce youth representation in the National Assembly, and make other institutional and representational changes.

Keywords
- constitutional amendment; Zimbabwe; Vice-Presidents; judicial appointments
- Status: Current legislation

Constitution of Zimbabwe Amendment (No. 2) Act, 2021 (Act No. 2 of 2021) is an act of the Parliament of Zimbabwe that amended the Constitution of Zimbabwe of 2013. It was signed into law by President Emmerson Mnangagwa on 7 May 2021 and published in the Government Gazette on 8 May 2021. The Amendment introduced major changes to the selection of Vice-Presidents, the appointment and promotion of judges, judicial tenure, and other institutional arrangements. It was the second substantive amendment to the 2013 Constitution. The legislative process attracted criticism for being fast-tracked with significant last-minute amendments.

== Background ==
Following the adoption of the 2013 Constitution, the ZANU–PF government sought to make further adjustments to address what it described as practical challenges in implementation. The Amendment (No. 2) Bill formed part of this process. Supporters maintained that changes such as the removal of the running-mate system for Vice-Presidents would streamline executive functioning, while critics argued that the reforms increased presidential power and reduced transparency in judicial appointments.

== Legislative history ==
The Bill was first gazetted in late 2019 and had its Second Reading in the National Assembly in July 2020. It was revived in April 2021, when it passed its Second Reading on 14 April. The National Assembly then suspended Standing Orders to fast-track the Committee and Third Reading stages. On 15 April, the Minister of Justice introduced several substantial amendments during the Committee Stage, which were passed in a late-night sitting. The Bill subsequently passed through the Senate.

President Mnangagwa signed the Bill on 7 May 2021.

== Key provisions ==
The amendment made numerous changes. The most significant included:

- Vice-presidents: Removed the requirement for presidential candidates to name running mates. The president was instead empowered to appoint up to two vice-presidents after taking office. Vice-Presidents could be removed by the president.
- Judicial appointments: Removed the requirement for public interviews by the Judicial Service Commission when promoting sitting judges to higher courts.
- Judicial tenure: Revised retirement ages and introduced limited provisions for extension of service beyond age 70 in certain cases.
- Other changes: Introduced youth representation in the National Assembly, strengthened women’s representation requirements in various bodies, renamed the Civil Service as the Public Service, and created the position of Chief Secretary to the Office of President and Cabinet.

== Reactions ==
=== Government and state media perspective ===
The government and ZANU–PF presented the Amendment as a necessary refinement of the 2013 Constitution to remove practical difficulties and improve governance efficiency. The Herald, Zimbabwe's main state-owned daily newspaper, reported positively on the Bill's progress. It highlighted that the Senate passed the Amendment on 5 May 2021 by 65 votes to 10, noting that some MDC-T senators joined ZANU–PF and traditional leaders in support. State media generally framed the changes as progressive reforms that would enhance stability and align constitutional provisions with practical requirements.

=== Opposition and civil society criticism ===
Independent media and civil society organisations were highly critical. The removal of the running-mate system was a major point of contention. The Crisis in Zimbabwe Coalition argued that the original clause had been intended to prevent the appointment of “weak, mediocre and disposable Vice Presidents” and to make succession an electoral issue. Changes to judicial appointments also drew strong opposition. Veritas Zimbabwe warned that dispensing with mandatory public interviews for the promotion of sitting judges reduced transparency and increased the risk of executive influence over the judiciary. Legal academic Lovemore Madhuku criticised provisions allowing extensions of judicial tenure beyond retirement age, arguing that they created a mechanism through which the executive could reward compliant judges.

The fast-tracking process itself was heavily criticised. Veritas Zimbabwe described several late-stage amendments as unconstitutional because they introduced substantial new provisions without adequate public consultation as required by Section 328 of the Constitution. A joint civil society statement issued in April 2021 condemned both the process and the substance of the changes.

In independent outlets such as ZimLive, commentators described the Amendment as a significant step backwards that concentrated excessive power in the presidency.

=== Public and parliamentary response ===
Public reaction, as reported in independent media, was predominantly negative among urban populations and opposition supporters. Petitions against the Amendment circulated in May 2021. In Parliament, while the Bill passed comfortably, some opposition MPs voiced strong objections during debates, particularly regarding the implications for judicial independence and democratic accountability.

== Legal challenges ==
Civil society organisations, including Veritas Zimbabwe and the Law Society of Zimbabwe, publicly announced their intention to challenge the validity of the Act shortly after its publication. The main grounds cited were procedural irregularities in the legislative process (particularly the introduction of substantial amendments during the Committee Stage) and the potential impact of the changes on judicial independence.

The most significant legal challenge was Marx Mupungu v Minister of Justice (2021). The case focused on the provisions extending the retirement age of judges, particularly those affecting Constitutional Court and Supreme Court judges. The applicants argued that these changes violated constitutional safeguards under section 328. On 31 March 2021, the Constitutional Court upheld the constitutionality of the tenure-extension provisions, ruling that the amendments were valid. This decision allowed Chief Justice Luke Malaba to continue in office beyond his original retirement date under the new framework.

Urgent applications were also filed in the High Court seeking declaratory orders regarding the effect of the Amendment on the Chief Justice's retirement. These applications were linked to the broader constitutional challenge but were ultimately addressed by the Constitutional Court’s ruling.

Although civil society groups raised serious concerns about both the process and substance of the Amendment, no challenge succeeded in overturning the Act or its core provisions.
