= Constitution of Zimbabwe Amendment (No. 1) Act, 2017 =

Parliament of Zimbabwe
- Long title: Constitution of Zimbabwe Amendment (No. 1) Act, 2017
- Citation: Act No. 10 of 2017
- Territorial extent: Zimbabwe
- Passed by: National Assembly of Zimbabwe
- Passed: 2017
- Passed by: Senate of Zimbabwe
- Passed: 1 August 2017 (initial passage); re-passed after 2020 Constitutional Court ruling
- Signed by: Robert Mugabe
- Signed: 2017
- Effective: 7 September 2017

Legislative history

Initiating chamber: National Assembly of Zimbabwe
- Bill title: Constitution of Zimbabwe Amendment (No. 1) Bill, 2017
- Introduced by: Minister of Justice, Legal and Parliamentary Affairs
- Introduced: 2017
- Committee responsible: Portfolio Committee on Justice, Legal and Parliamentary Affairs

Revising chamber: Senate of Zimbabwe
- Bill title: Constitution of Zimbabwe Amendment (No. 1) Bill, 2017
- Third reading: 1 August 2017 (initial); re-passed after court ruling

Final stages
- Finally passed both chambers: After 2020 Constitutional Court ruling

Amends
- Constitution of Zimbabwe (2013)

Related legislation
- Constitution of Zimbabwe Amendment (No. 2) Act, 2021

Summary
- Amended the Constitution to change the appointment process for the Chief Justice, Deputy Chief Justice and Judge President of the High Court, removing the requirement for public interviews by the Judicial Service Commission and increasing presidential discretion in these appointments.

Keywords
- constitutional amendment; Zimbabwe; judicial appointments; Chief Justice; 2017
- Status: Current legislation

Constitution of Zimbabwe Amendment (No. 1) Act, 2017 (Act No. 10 of 2017) is an act of the Parliament of Zimbabwe that amended the Constitution of Zimbabwe of 2013. It was the first amendment to the 2013 Constitution and primarily changed the procedure for appointing the Chief Justice, Deputy Chief Justice, and Judge President of the High Court.

The Amendment removed the requirement for public interviews by the Judicial Service Commission for these senior judicial positions and increased the President’s direct role in their appointment. The Bill’s passage was highly controversial and became the subject of significant litigation. In 2020, the Constitutional Court declared that the Senate's initial approval of the Bill was unconstitutional because it failed to achieve the required two-thirds majority.

== Background ==
The 2013 Constitution had introduced reforms aimed at strengthening judicial independence, including requirements for public interviews and recommendations by the Judicial Service Commission for senior judicial appointments. The ZANU–PF government argued that these procedures created unnecessary delays and that the president should have greater flexibility in appointing the most senior judicial officers.

Critics, including members of the legal profession, opposition parties, and civil society organisations, viewed the changes as an attempt to increase executive control over the judiciary and undermine judicial independence.

== Legislative history ==
The Constitution of Zimbabwe Amendment (No. 1) Bill, 2017 was introduced during the final years of President Robert Mugabe's administration. It passed the National Assembly without major difficulty. However, when the Bill reached the Senate, the vote held on 1 August 2017 failed to secure the two-thirds majority required by section 328(5) of the Constitution.

This procedural failure led to legal action. In a judgment delivered in early 2020, the Constitutional Court ruled that the passing of the Bill by the Senate was inconsistent with the Constitution. The Court declared the enactment invalid to the extent of the inconsistency but suspended the declaration of invalidity for 180 days to allow Parliament an opportunity to correct the defect.

Parliament subsequently passed the Bill again in accordance with constitutional requirements. The Amendment was eventually signed into law.

== Key provisions ==
The Amendment made the following principal changes to the Constitution:

- Removed the mandatory requirement for public interviews by the Judicial Service Commission when appointing the Chief Justice, Deputy Chief Justice, and Judge President of the High Court.
- Gave the president greater discretion in making these senior judicial appointments.
- Made consequential amendments to related provisions governing the judicial appointment process.

These changes represented a significant shift from the more transparent and participatory appointment mechanisms established under the 2013 Constitution.

== Reactions ==
=== Government and state media perspective ===
The government maintained that the Amendment would streamline the appointment of senior judicial officers and remove procedural inefficiencies. State media, including The Herald, generally reported on the Bill’s progress through Parliament in neutral or factual terms, focusing on the legislative process rather than substantive criticism.

=== Opposition and civil society criticism ===
The Amendment was strongly opposed by the legal profession, civil society, and opposition parties. Critics argued that it represented a reversal of the judicial independence gains made in the 2013 Constitution and would allow greater political interference in the judiciary.

The Crisis in Zimbabwe Coalition and other organisations described the changes as undermining constitutionalism and the separation of powers. The International Commission of Jurists welcomed the 2020 Constitutional Court judgment that initially invalidated the Senate’s passage of the Bill, viewing it as an important defence of constitutional procedure.

== Legal challenges ==
The Amendment faced significant legal challenge. Following the Senate’s initial vote on 1 August 2017, legal proceedings were initiated on the grounds that the Bill had not secured the constitutionally required two-thirds majority.

In its 2020 judgment, the Constitutional Court declared that the passing of Constitutional Amendment Bill (No. 1) of 2017 by the Senate was inconsistent with section 328(5) of the Constitution. The Court suspended the declaration of invalidity for 180 days to permit Parliament to rectify the procedural defect.

After Parliament re-passed the Bill in compliance with constitutional requirements, the Amendment came into force. No subsequent challenges succeeded in overturning the Act.

== Impact ==
The Amendment marked a shift towards greater executive influence over senior judicial appointments. It was later followed by further constitutional changes in 2021 under the Constitution of Zimbabwe Amendment (No. 2) Act, which made additional modifications to judicial tenure and appointment processes.
