= Thabani Mpofu =

Zimbabwean lawyer

- Born: 13 April 1982 (age 44)
- Education: LL.B. University of Zimbabwe
- Occupations: Lawyer, Advocate
- Notable work: Zimbabwean constitution litigation, 2018 Zimbabwean Presidential Election Petition

Thabani Mpofu is a prominent Zimbabwean commercial, constitutional, human rights, and political litigation lawyer as well as advocate of the High Court, Supreme Court of Zimbabwe and Constitutional Court of Zimbabwe.

== Background ==
Born on the 13th of April 1982 in Ingezi Kadoma, Thabani Mpofu grew up in Kadoma where he had his early education at Mupawose Primary School and Munyaradzi Secondary School after which he joined Jameson High School for his “A” Levels. After high school, Mpofu enrolled for a Law Degree with the Great Zimbabwe University but following the closure of that university's faculty of law, he then joined the University of Zimbabwe to continue with his degree.

In 2008, his final year at the University of Zimbabwe, Thabani won both the ICRC national moot court competition with a team that included Fadzayi Mahere and Farai Mushoriwa. The team went on to win ICRC African moot court competition, where he was named the best speaker in the finals which came with an internship with the United Nations International Criminal Tribunal for Rwanda (ICTR) based in Arusha, Tanzania. Thabani Mpofu briefly worked as a Legal Researcher in the Office of the Trial Prosecutor and took part in the prosecution of Ephrem Setako.

== Career ==
In 2009 Thabani joined the Bar of Zimbabwe as the youngest advocate in the country. In 2012, Thabani he formed a human rights trust called Thabani Mpofu Center for Justice. In 2015 he co-founded The Chambers - Advocates for Zimbabwe, which is the largest set of chambers in the Zimbabwe.

Thabani Mpofu has been involved major cases in commercial, constitutional and political litigation in Zimbabwe and has represented a significant number of companies on the Zimbabwe Stock Exchange as well as government officials, deposed presidents and other organisations. Thabani has been invited as amicus curiae to the Constitutional Court of Zimbabwe, High Court and Supreme Courts of Zimbabwe in complex litigation. In 2016 he was named in the JCI Zimbabwe Ten Outstanding Young Persons Award and has been included several times in top 40 of most influential young Zimbabweans in the various lists drawn in Zimbabwe.

Some of his notable cases is when he persuaded the Constitutional Court to declare an amendment to the Constitution as being unconstitutional, becoming the only lawyer to achieve that feat in the Constitutional Court of Zimbabwe. In 2012, Mpofu represented and won former Prime Minister Morgan Tsvangirai's bid to sue former president Robert Mugabe without seeking the leave of court, becoming the first case of that kind. In 2019 he led a bid in the Constitutional Court against a High Court of Zimbabwe judgment that outlawed corporal punishment in Zimbabwe. In May 2021, Thabani obtained a judgment from three judges of the High Court which held that the term of office of Chief Justice Luke Malaba had come to an end and that the constitutional amendment that had been pushed by the ruling ZANU-PF party did not benefit him. Thabani is also responsible for the judgment of the Constitutional Court (Chidyausiku CJ) which struck down as unconstitutional a provision in the Criminal Procedure and Evidence Act which gave the Prosecutor General the power to suspend the ruling of a court on bail pending an appeal.

=== 2018 Zimbabwean Presidential Election Petition ===
In August 2018, Advocate Thabani Mpofu represented Zimbabwe's main opposition leader Nelson Chamisa in a petition to challenge the outcome of the 2018 Zimbabwe presidential election which was presented by the Zimbabwe Electoral Commission and the proceedings were broadcast live on state television for the first time in the country's history which led to him becoming more popular and some artists released some songs dedicated to him.

== Positions held ==
- Council of Legal Education lecturer
- Medical Council of Zimbabwe board
- Veterinary Council of Zimbabwe board
- Judicial Services of Zimbabwe board
- Chairman for Council of Advocates
