= Leo Baron =

British judge

Leo S. Baron

Chief Justice of Zimbabwe (Acting)
- In office 1983
- Preceded by: John Fieldsend
- Succeeded by: Telford Georges

Judge of Appeal of the High Court of Zimbabwe
- In office 8 May 1980 – 1983

Deputy Chief Justice of Zambia
- In office 1970s – 18 January 1979

Personal details
- Born: 13 October 1916 Plauen, Kingdom of Saxony
- Died: 22 October 1985 (aged 69) Harare, Zimbabwe
- Education: King's College London (LL.B.)

Leo Solomon Baron (13 October 1916 – 22 October 1985) was a British lawyer, Royal Air Force officer and contract bridge player who practised law in Southern Rhodesia (today Zimbabwe) during the 1950s and 1960s, sat on the Supreme Court of Zambia during the 1970s, and briefly served as Acting Chief Justice of Zimbabwe in 1983.

== Biography ==
Baron was born to a Polish-Jewish family in Plauen in eastern Germany, the brother of the historian and scientist Jacob Bronowski, and raised in Britain. He read law at King's College London. A contract bridge champion, he developed, with Adam Meredith, the Baron System of bidding during the 1940s.

During the Second World War, Baron was a squadron leader in the Royal Air Force, and was stationed in Southern Rhodesia. He settled there after the war and in 1952 set up a law practice in the self-governing colony's second city, Bulawayo. His clients over the next decade and a half included the prominent black nationalist Joshua Nkomo.

When Ian Smith's government unilaterally declared independence on 11 November 1965, Baron, who challenged the Smith administration's legality, was arrested and kept in solitary confinement until April 1967. He returned to Britain following his release. During the 1970s he returned to Africa to become Deputy Chief Justice of Zambia. While on Zambia's Supreme Court he decided the controversial case Harry Mwaanga Nkumbula, which ruled that the Supreme Court could not prevent the "likely" violation of Zambia's constitution.

Baron was a legal adviser to black nationalist negotiators in the negotiations leading to the Lancaster House Agreement of December 1979, which led to the internationally recognised independence of Zimbabwe the following year. In 1980, he was appointed on a three-year contract as a Judge of Appeal of the High Court of Zimbabwe. He was appointed Acting Chief Justice of Zimbabwe in 1983, but retired shortly afterwards, citing his health. He died in the Zimbabwean capital Harare on 22 October 1985.

== Publications ==
- Contract Bridge: the Baron system outlined, Baron and Adam Meredith (London: Nicholson & Watson, 1946), 32 pp. OCLC 556917412
- The Baron System of Contract Bridge, Baron and Meredith (Leeds: Contract Bridge Equipment Ltd, 1948), 180 pp. OCLC 13504611
