= National Prosecuting Authority of Zimbabwe =

(in other official languages)
Northern Ndebele	Ithimba Elilawula Ezokutshutshisa
Shona	Boka Rinoona Nezvekutongwa Kwemhosva

Constitutional body overview
- Formed: 2013
- Preceding Constitutional body: Attorney-General of Zimbabwe (prosecutorial functions)
- Jurisdiction: Zimbabwe
- Headquarters: 101 Kwame Nkrumah Avenue, Harare
- Constitutional body executives: Loice Matanda-Moyo, Prosecutor-General; Nelson Mutsonziwa; Tariro Takuva; Chris Mutangadura , Deputy Prosecutors-General; Dingidhlela Zisengwe, Secretary
- Website: www.npa.gov.zw

The National Prosecuting Authority of Zimbabwe (NPAZ) is the principal public agency responsible for instituting and undertaking criminal prosecutions on behalf of the State in Zimbabwe. It was established by section 258 of the Constitution of Zimbabwe (2013) to ensure the independent and impartial conduct of prosecutions. The Authority is headed by the Prosecutor-General, whose office is established under section 259 of the Constitution.

The NPAZ operates separately from the Attorney-General, whose constitutional functions focus on legal advice to the Government, civil and constitutional proceedings, and legislative drafting. The Prosecutor-General may direct the Commissioner-General of Police to investigate any matter relating to an offence and must formulate and publicly disclose the general principles by which decisions to institute and conduct criminal proceedings are made.

== History ==
Prior to the 2013 Constitution, criminal prosecutions were conducted by the Attorney-General as part of a combined advisory and prosecutorial role.

The 2013 Constitution created the National Prosecuting Authority under section 258 and established the distinct office of Prosecutor-General under section 259. These provisions were designed to separate prosecutorial functions from government legal advice and to embed constitutional guarantees of independence and impartiality. Transitional arrangements provided that the person holding office as Attorney-General immediately before the effective date would continue as the first Prosecutor-General.

Johannes Tomana, the then Attorney-General, was sworn in as the first Prosecutor-General in November 2013. The National Prosecuting Authority Act, Act No. 5 of 2014 (Chapter 7:20), was enacted to give effect to constitutional requirements by establishing the National Prosecuting Authority Board, providing for the administration of the Authority, conditions of service of staff, and related matters.

Justice Loice Matanda-Moyo was appointed Prosecutor-General in October 2023. Under her leadership, the NPAZ has emphasised reforms including training, digitalisation, professionalism, and alignment with constitutional and public interest principles.

== Organisation ==
The National Prosecuting Authority is headed by the Prosecutor-General. Administrative and employment matters are overseen by the National Prosecuting Authority Board established by the National Prosecuting Authority Act, 2014. The Board is responsible for employing staff to assist the Prosecutor-General, determining their qualifications, conditions of service, conduct and discipline, and ensuring the structure, organisation, and efficient performance of the Authority.

Staff of the NPAZ, including prosecutors and support personnel, must act independently and impartially, subject only to the law and the direction and control of the Prosecutor-General. Officers are prohibited from acting in a partisan manner or furthering the interests of any political party or cause.

The Authority maintains a national presence to conduct prosecutions in courts across Zimbabwe and contributes to the Justice, Law and Order Sectoral Outcomes under the National Development Strategy 2, including enhanced service delivery, public safety, access to justice, and reduced corruption.

== Oversight and independence ==
The Prosecutor-General is independent and not subject to the direction or control of any person or authority. The Prosecutor-General and all officers of the NPAZ must exercise their functions impartially and without fear, favour, prejudice or bias.

The Prosecutor-General is required to submit an annual report on the operations and activities of the NPAZ to Parliament through the appropriate Minister, no later than six months after the beginning of the following year.

An Act of Parliament may confer prosecution powers on persons other than the NPAZ, provided such powers do not limit or conflict with those of the Authority.

== Roles and responsibilities ==
The primary mandate of the NPAZ is to institute and undertake criminal prosecutions on behalf of the State and to discharge any functions necessary or incidental to such prosecutions.

Key responsibilities include:

- Instituting and conducting criminal proceedings in accordance with the Constitution and the law.
- Directing the Commissioner-General of Police to investigate and report on any matter the Prosecutor-General considers relates to an offence or alleged or suspected offence.
- Formulating and publicly disclosing the general principles by which decisions to institute and conduct criminal proceedings are made, ensuring decisions are based on evidence and the public interest.
- Conducting prosecutions from charge through to appeal and sentencing where appropriate.
- Contributing to broader justice sector goals, including the fight against corruption and the maintenance of public confidence in the criminal justice system.

== See also ==
- Attorney-General of Zimbabwe
- Prosecutor-General of Zimbabwe
- Constitution of Zimbabwe
- Zimbabwe Republic Police
