= Prosecutor-General of Zimbabwe =

(in other official languages)
Northern Ndebele	UMtshutshisi-Jikelele
Shona	Mukuru weBoka
- Incumbent; Loice Matanda-Moyo since 5 October 2023
- National Prosecuting Authority
- Style: The Honourable
- Member of: National Prosecuting Authority; Judicial Service Commission
- Reports to: Parliament
- Seat: 101 Kwame Nkrumah Avenue, Harare
- Appointer: The President
- Term length: Six years, renewable once
- Constituting instrument: Constitution of Zimbabwe
- Precursor: Attorney-General of Zimbabwe
- Inaugural holder: Johannes Tomana
- Formation: 22 August 2013 (13 years ago)
- Deputy: Deputy Prosecutors-General
- Website: npa.gov.zw

The Prosecutor-General of Zimbabwe is the head of the National Prosecuting Authority and the principal officer responsible for instituting and undertaking criminal prosecutions on behalf of the State. The office was created by the Constitution of Zimbabwe (2013) as part of reforms to separate criminal prosecutions from the advisory and civil litigation functions of the Attorney-General and to strengthen the independence of the prosecution service.

The Prosecutor-General is independent and not subject to the direction or control of any person or authority. The office must exercise its functions impartially and without fear, favour, prejudice or bias. The Prosecutor-General formulates and publicly discloses the general principles governing decisions to institute and conduct criminal proceedings.

== History ==
Prior to the adoption of the 2013 Constitution, criminal prosecutions in Zimbabwe were conducted by the Attorney-General, who combined prosecutorial, legal advisory and government representation roles.

The 2013 Constitution established the National Prosecuting Authority (NPA) under section 258 and created the distinct office of Prosecutor-General under section 259. The reforms aimed to professionalise prosecutions, enhance independence, and insulate prosecutorial decisions from executive influence. Transitional provisions provided that the person holding office as Attorney-General immediately before the effective date of the new Constitution would continue as the first Prosecutor-General.

Johannes Tomana, who had been Attorney-General, was sworn in as the first Prosecutor-General in November 2013. The National Prosecuting Authority Act [Chapter 7:20] was subsequently enacted to provide for the organisation, staffing and operations of the NPA.

== Role and functions ==
Section 258 of the Constitution establishes the National Prosecuting Authority, which is responsible for instituting and undertaking criminal prosecutions on behalf of the State and discharging any functions necessary or incidental to such prosecutions.

The Prosecutor-General, as head of the NPA:

- directs the institution and conduct of criminal proceedings;
- may direct the Commissioner-General of Police to investigate and report on any matter relating to an offence or alleged or suspected offence;
- formulates and publicly discloses the general principles by which decisions to institute and conduct proceedings are made; and
- exercises any other functions conferred by the Constitution or an Act of Parliament.

The Prosecutor-General and all officers of the NPA must act in accordance with the Constitution and the law. Officers are prohibited from acting in a partisan manner, furthering the interests of any political party, or violating fundamental rights and freedoms. An Act of Parliament may make further provision to ensure political neutrality.

== Appointment, qualifications, tenure and removal ==
The Prosecutor-General is appointed by the President. The appointee must be qualified for appointment as a judge of the Supreme Court.

The term of office is six years and is renewable for one further term. Before assuming office, the Prosecutor-General takes the oath of office before the President or a person authorised by the President.

The provisions relating to the removal of a judge from office apply to the removal of the Prosecutor-General. Remuneration is a charge on the Consolidated Revenue Fund and may not be reduced during tenure. Conditions of service are provided for by an Act of Parliament.

The office of Prosecutor-General is a public office but does not form part of the Civil Service. An Act of Parliament provides for a board to employ and manage staff of the NPA, ensuring their independence and impartiality under the direction and control of the Prosecutor-General.

== Independence and accountability ==
Subject to the Constitution, the Prosecutor-General is independent and not subject to the direction or control of anyone. The Prosecutor-General and NPA officers must exercise functions impartially and without fear, favour, prejudice or bias.

The Prosecutor-General must submit an annual report to Parliament, through the appropriate minister, on the operations and activities of the NPA. The report is submitted not later than six months after the beginning of the year following the year to which it relates.

== Relationship with other institutions ==
The Prosecutor-General works closely with the Zimbabwe Republic Police, whom the Prosecutor-General may direct to investigate specific matters. The office operates independently of the Attorney-General, whose functions are limited to legal advice to the Government, civil and constitutional litigation, and legislative drafting.

The NPA contributes to the broader justice sector under the National Development Strategy and collaborates with other institutions in combating crime and corruption while upholding constitutional standards of fairness and impartiality.

== List of prosecutors-general ==
Since the establishment of the office under the 2013 Constitution, the following individuals have served as Prosecutor-General:

- Johannes Tomana, 22 August 2013 – 9 June 2017
- Ray Gaba (acting), June 2017 –
- Kumbirai Hodzi,
- Nelson Mutsonziwa (acting), 8 March 2022
- Loice Matanda-Moyo, 5 October 2023 -

== See also ==
- Attorney-General of Zimbabwe
- National Prosecuting Authority of Zimbabwe
- Constitution of Zimbabwe
- Judicial Service Commission (Zimbabwe)
- Zimbabwe Republic Police
