= Constitutional Court of Zimbabwe =

- Interactive map of Constitutional Court of Zimbabwe
- 17.82552149001522°S 31.052287656318207°E
- Established: 2013
- Location: Harare
- Coordinates: 17.82552149001522°S 31.052287656318207°E
- Composition method: Presidential nomination after consultation with the Judicial Service Commission
- Authorised by: Constitution of Zimbabwe
- Judge term length: Single term of no more than 15 years, or until the age of 75
- Number of positions: 7
- Website: www.jsc.org.zw

Chief Justice of Zimbabwe
- Currently: Elizabeth Gwaunza
- Since: 15 May 2026
- Lead position ends: 15 June 2028

Deputy Chief Justice of Zimbabwe
- Currently: Paddington Garwe
- Since: 15 May 2026

The Constitutional Court of Zimbabwe is the apex court in all constitutional matters in Zimbabwe. Established under the 2013 Constitution, it is a superior court of record and the final authority on questions of constitutional interpretation and application. Its decisions bind all other courts.

The court was created as part of the major judicial reforms introduced by the Constitution of Zimbabwe Amendment (No. 20) Act 2013, which replaced the Lancaster House Constitution. For the first time in the country's history, Zimbabwe has a dedicated constitutional court separate from the Supreme Court.

== History ==
Under the Lancaster House Constitution (1980) and its numerous amendments, constitutional questions were heard by the Supreme Court as the highest appellate body. There was no specialised constitutional court. The 2013 Constitution, adopted after the Global Political Agreement and extensive public consultation, established the Constitutional Court as the highest court in all constitutional matters (Chapter 8). The court became operational following the harmonised elections of July 2013 and the full commencement of the new Constitution on 22 August 2013.

The creation of the court was intended to strengthen constitutionalism, the rule of law and the protection of fundamental rights. It marked a significant departure from the previous system, in which the executive had frequently amended the constitution to override judicial decisions on rights and land issues.

== Composition and membership ==
The Constitutional Court consists of the Chief Justice, the Deputy Chief Justice and five other judges (seven in total). It is a superior court of record.

Judges are appointed by the President on the advice of the Judicial Service Commission following public interviews and a transparent selection process (as amended by the Constitution of Zimbabwe Amendment (No. 1) Act, 2017). Amendment No. 2 (2021) extended the retirement age for Constitutional Court judges from 70 to 75 (or an elected additional five-year term).

As of May 2026 the court is constituted as follows:

- Chief Justice: Elizabeth Gwaunza (serving since 15 May 2026).
- Deputy Chief Justice: Paddington Garwe (serving since 15 May 2026).
- Judges: Justices Rita Makarau, Anne-Marie Gowora, Ben Hlatshwayo and Bharat Patel (sworn in as substantive judges of the Constitutional Court).

The court sits as a full bench or in panels depending on the matter.

== Jurisdiction ==
The Constitutional Court is the highest court in all constitutional matters and its decisions on those matters bind all other courts. It decides only constitutional matters and issues connected with decisions on constitutional matters.

Its jurisdiction includes:

- Original jurisdiction over constitutional questions referred by other courts or brought directly (with leave in certain cases).
- Appellate jurisdiction on constitutional issues arising from decisions of the Supreme Court or other courts.
- Exclusive jurisdiction over certain matters, such as the validity of presidential elections and challenges to the constitutionality of Acts of Parliament.
- Power to declare any law, conduct or omission inconsistent with the Constitution invalid to the extent of the inconsistency.

The court exercises both first-instance and appellate jurisdiction in constitutional cases.

== Notable cases ==
The Constitutional Court has delivered several landmark rulings since its establishment:

- Mawarire v Mugabe (2013): The court ordered the holding of presidential and parliamentary elections by 31 July 2013, resolving a dispute over the timing of elections after the expiry of the Government of National Unity.
- Gonese & Anor v Parliament of Zimbabwe (CCZ 4/20, 2020): The court invalidated the initial passage of Constitution Amendment (No. 1) Bill 2017 due to an insufficient Senate vote, though the defect was later rectified.
- Marx Mupungu v Minister of Justice (2021): The court upheld the constitutionality of the tenure-extension provisions in Constitution Amendment (No. 2) Act 2021, allowing Chief Justice Luke Malaba to continue in office beyond the original retirement age.
- Child rights and age of consent cases: The court has delivered progressive rulings affirming the best interests of the child and striking down laws inconsistent with constitutional protections for minors.

The court continues to hear high-profile matters, including challenges to constitutional amendment processes and direct-access applications on fundamental rights.
