= 2018 Zimbabwean presidential election petition =

Zimbabwe Presidential Election Petition, 2018
- Coat of arms of Zimbabwe
- Court: Constitutional Court of Zimbabwe
- Full case name: Chamisa v Mnangagwa & 24 Others (CCZ 42/18) [2018] ZWCC 42 (24 August 2018)

Court membership
- Judges sitting: Chief Justice of Zimbabwe Luke Malaba (Deputy CJ) Elizabeth Gwaunza (JCC)Rita Makarau (JCC)Paddington Garwe (JCC)Chinembiri Bhunu (JCC)Baratkumar Patel (JCC)Ben Hlatshwayo (JCC)Tendai Uchena (JCC)Lavender Makoni

Case opinions
- In a unanimous judgement, the nine judges ruled against the opposition's petition stating that it did not include sufficient evidence to nullify or invalidate the presidential poll results(per) 110 (3)(i) (of The Constitution of Zimbabwe Amendment (No. 20) Act, 2013)
- Decision by: CJ Luke Malaba, joined by unanimous

The 2018 Zimbabwe Presidential election petition aimed to overturn the Zimbabwe's presidential elections results which declared Emmerson Dambudzo Mnangagwa as victor. The election was held on Monday, 30 July 2018.

== Background ==
On 20 August Movement for Democratic Change Alliance (MDC Alliance) president Nelson Chamisa filed an official challenge of the results of the election. On August 3, Emmerson Dambudzo Mnangagwa was declared winner of the elections with 50.8 per cent of the total votes cast to Mr Chamisa's 44.3 per cent. Nelson Chamisa disputed the results.

== Chamisa's election petition ==
Applicant: MDC Alliance Leader, Nelson Chamisa

Political experts said that the appeal faces difficulties because of Zimbabwe's political scene and Judicial idiosyncrasies citing that the Judges' own values, perspectives, and secret personal and monetary interests plays a considerably more decisive role with regards to managing the argumentative issues Some political examiners anticipated that the lawful test had minimal shot of achievement.

== Respondents ==
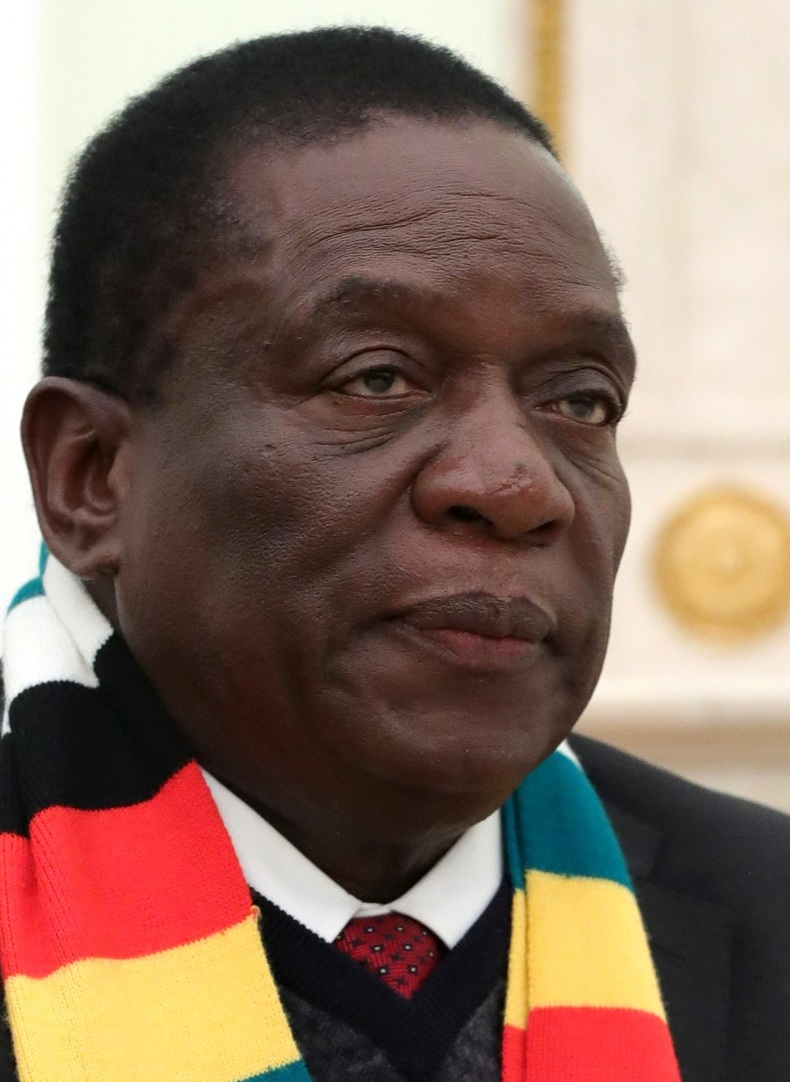
First Respondent: President Emmerson Mnangagwa

President Mnangagwa alongside the other 21 losing presidential hopefuls and ZEC were altogether referred to as respondents in the prominent request by the MDC Alliance Leader. In his reaction recorded, Mnangagwa contended that there was no substantial election appeal.

Emmerson Dambudzo Mnangagwa	First Respondent
Joseph Busha	Second Respondent
Melbah Dzapasi	Third Respondent
Nkosana Moyo	Fourth Respondent
Noah Manyika	Fifth Respondent
Harry Peter Wilson	Sixth Respondent
Taurai Mteki	Seventh Respondent
Thokozani Khuphe	Eighth Respondent
Divine Mhambi	Ninth Respondent
Lovemore Madhuku	Tenth Respondent
Peter Munyanduri	Eleventh Respondent
Ambrose Mutinhiri	Twelfth Respondent
Timothy Johannes Chiguvare	Thirteenth Respondent
Joice Mujuru	Fourteenth Respondent
Kwanele Hlabangana	Fifteenth Respondent
Evaristo Chikanga	Sixteenth Respondent
Daniel Shumba	Seventeenth Respondent
Violet Mariyacha	Eighteenth Respondent
Blessing Kasiyamhuru	Nineteenth Respondent
Elton Mangoma	Twentieth Respondent
Peter Gava	Twenty-first Respondent
Willard Mugadza	Twenty-second Respondent
The Chairperson of the Zimbabwe Electoral Commission	Twenty-third Respondent
The Chief Executive Officer of the Zimbabwe Electoral Commission	Twenty-fourth Respondent
Zimbabwe Electoral Commission	Twenty-fifth Respondent

== Judges ==
MDC Alliance leader Nelson Chamisa's election petition was adjudicated by the 9 judges of the Constitutional Court. Led by Chief Justice Luke Malaba, the case was presided over by the following judges.

- Elizabeth Gwaunza Deputy CJ
- Rita Makarau JCC
- Paddington Garwe JCC
- Chinembiri Bhunu JCC
- Baratkumar Patel JCC
- Ben Hlatshwayo JCC
- Tendai Uchena JCC
- Lavender Makoni JCC

== Pre-Case Hearing ==
The trial observation mission evaluated the procedures of the petition as far as consistence with regional and global human rights law and principles. Prior to the petition hearing ruling party asserted the issue ought to be rejected in light of the fact that the MDC Alliance vacillated at law by not serving papers to Mnangagwa on time or to his correct address. The ruling party Zanu-PF said it had picked a team of 12 attorneys for the case documented by Mr Chamisa while Chamisa's leading Lawyer, Adv Thabani Mpofu said his team had adequate proof to turn around the result of the polls.

== Case Hearing ==
Both Legal advisors for Mnangagwa and the ZEC dismissed the allegations and said Chamisa had failed to provide tangible evidence.

== Ruling ==
During the case ruling CJ stated that the complaint consisted of general allegations. No allegations of an individual direct control of the procedure was advanced against the first Respondent. All claims were made without identity and particularity. He expressed that no verification or proof was offered, stressing that the court decides matters dependent on facts and proof set before it. Summarizing the unanimous ruling, Chief Justice Luke Malaba said that "the applicant has failed to place before court clear, direct, sufficient and credible evidence" of irregularities and fraud during the presidential vote. Therefore, in terms of section 93(4)(a) of the Constitution of Zimbabwe, Emmerson Dambudzo Mnangagwa was declared the winner of the election.

== Aftermath ==
Mnangagwa's swearing in ceremony was held on 26 August 2018. After Mnangagwa was officially sworn in as the President of the Republic of Zimbabwe, some people called for coalition government.
