= Ziyambi Ziyambi =

Zimbabwean politician

The Honourable Ziyambi Ziyambi
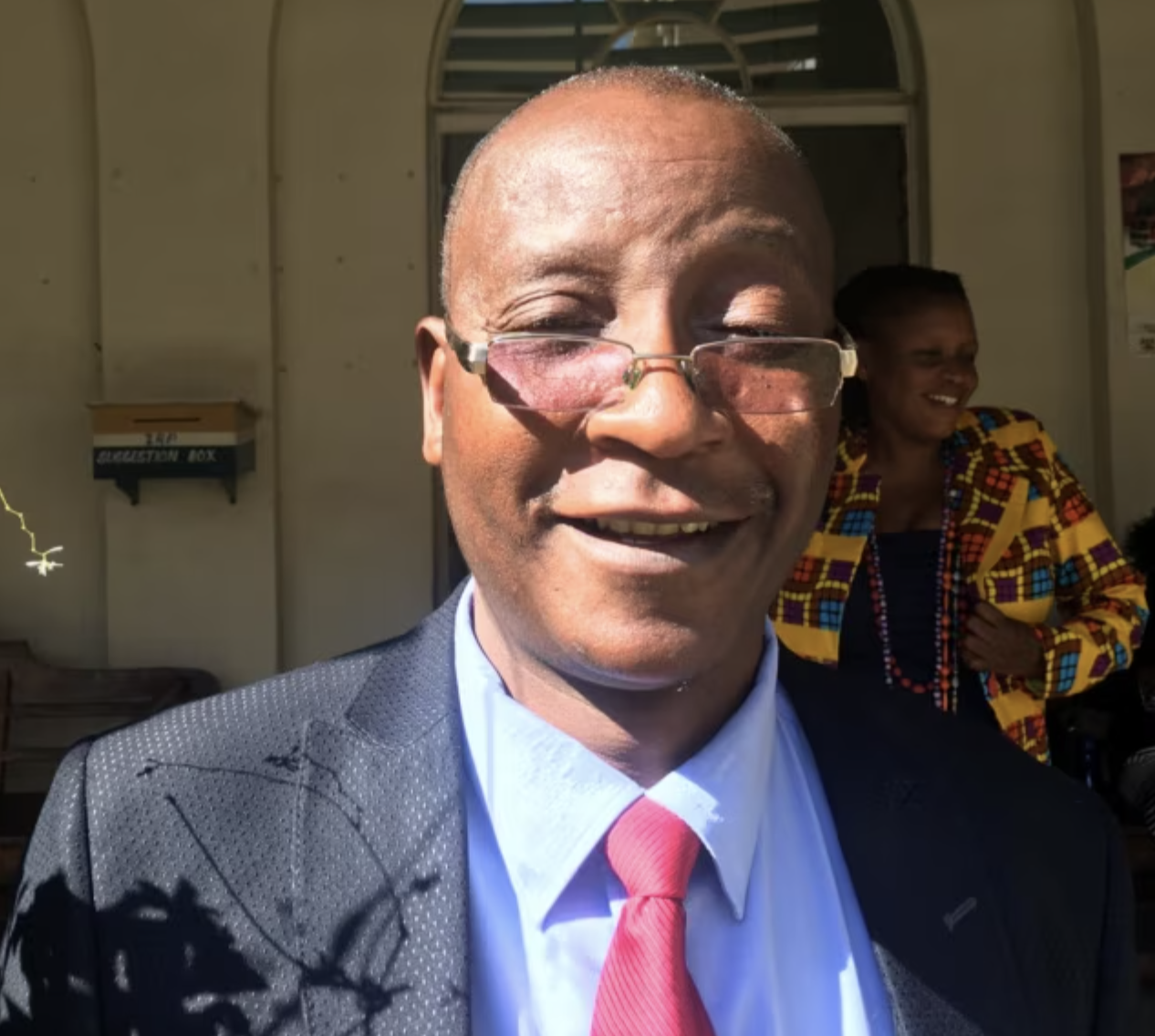
- Ziyambi in July 2017

Minister of Justice, Legal and Parliamentary Affairs
- Incumbent
- Assumed office 1 December 2017
- President: Emmerson Mnangagwa
- Deputy: Nobert Mazungunye
- Preceded by: Happyton Bonyongwe

Member of Parliament for Zvimba West
- In office 22 August 2013 – 22 August 2023
- President: Robert Mugabe; Emmerson Mnangagwa
- Preceded by: Nelson Tapera Crispen Samkange
- Succeeded by: Mercy Maruva Dinha
- Constituency: Zvimba West
- Majority: 3,922

Deputy Minister of Home Affairs
- In office 10 September 2013 – 10 September 2015
- President: Robert Mugabe
- Minister: Kembo Mohadi

Personal details
- Party: ZANU-PF

Ziyambi Ziyambi is Zimbabwe's Minister of Justice, Legal and Parliamentary Affairs. He has held the post as a member of Zanu-PF in the Emmerson Mnangagwa government since 2018.

Ziyambi entered politics in 2013 when he was elected as the House of Assembly representative. From September 2013 to September 2015, he served in cabinet in Robert Mugabe's government, as a Deputy Minister of Home Affairs. Virginia Mabiza was his ministry's permanent secretary.

He grew up on a farm in Zowa in Mashonaland West.

== Personal life ==
In the past, Ziyambi served as the treasurer of Caps United football club.

He is a qualified medical laboratory scientist who worked at Harare hospital and parirenyatwa group of hospital laboratory department mainly clinical chemistry laboratory which he headed for long time. He specialized also in Immunology.

He was with PSI from 2001 to 2005. He was the New Start project Manager responsible for testing. He did research on the use of rapid HIV testing and presented a paper at the World AIDS conference in Barcelona Spain in July 2002. He introduced rapid HIV point of care testing at all New Start centres in 2002 resulting in over 90% increase in access to testing.

He enrolled with Unisa 2009 and was awarded the LLB degree in 2013. He enrolled at MSU for the Master of Laws degree in Constitutional and Human Rights law in 2015. Graduated in Nov 2016 being the first group of graduates in Master of Laws degree from a local university. He was a member of Parliamentary Legal Committee 2015 to 2017. He was also Chairman of Portfolio Committee of Justice, Legal and parliamentary affairs 2015 to 2017.
