= Nicholas McNally =

Zimbabwean judge

Justice of the Supreme Court of Zimbabwe
- In office 1984–2001
- Appointed by: Robert Mugabe

Personal details
- Born: 1931
- Died: 2021 (aged 89–90)

Nicholas McNally was a Zimbabwean judge who sat on the Supreme Court of Zimbabwe.

== See also ==
- List of justices of the Supreme Court of Zimbabwe
