= Barnabas A. Samatta =

Tanzanian lawyer

Barnabas Albert Samatta

Chief Justice of the Judiciary of Tanzania
- In office 2000 – 20 July 2007
- Preceded by: Francis Lucas Nyalali
- Succeeded by: Augustino Ramadhani

Personal details
- Born: 20 July 1940 (age 85) Ng'ombo Village, Mbinga District, Ruvuma Region, Tanganyika Territory (now Tanzania)
- Occupation: Lawyer; Judge

Barnabas Albert Samatta (born 20 July 1940) is a retired Tanzanian lawyer and judge who was Chief Justice of the Judiciary of Tanzania from 2000 to 2007.

== Early years (1940–1966) ==
Barnabas Albert Samatta was born on 20 July 1940 in Ng'ombo Village, Mbinga District.

His parents were Mwalimu Cuthbert Samatta, a teacher, and Mary Julia Kayuza.

He was the youngest of a family of five.

His father died when he was nine and his maternal uncle, also a teacher, took responsibility for raising him.

He joined standard one at Ng'ombo Primary School, near Mbamba Bay, when he was ten years old, and after two months was advanced to standard three.

In 1953, he was admitted to Kilosa Native Authority School, also near Mbamba Bay. He completed standard six in 1954, then studied at Songea Boys Secondary School from 1955 to 1956, and at Tabora Boys Secondary School from 1957 to 1962, where he completed his secondary education.

In 1960, he took a temporary job at the Mwadui diamond mine near Shinyanga, at that time owned by De Beers of South Africa.

In 1962, he worked for the Mtwara District Court before joining the Faculty of Law of the University of Dar es Salaam in 1963.

In 1963, he was awarded a scholarship to study African Customary Law at the School of Oriental and African Studies in London.

In 1966, he graduated from the University of East Africa with an honours degree in Law.

== Attorney (1966–1976) ==
After completing his college education, on 5 April 1966, Samatta became a State Attorney in the Attorney General's Chambers in Dar es Salaam.

In September 1967, Samatta was named an assistant legal advisor to Earle E. Seaton in the delegation to the United Nations in New York for three months.

In 1968 he married Mercy Gladys Simba. They had four children.

Samatta was Senior State Attorney from 1971 to 1972, then Director of Public Prosecutions for Tanzania Mainland from 1972 to 1976.

From 1974 to 1977, he was a member of the Judicial System Review Commission.

== Judicial career (1976–2007) ==
In 1976 Samatta was appointed a judge of the High Court of Tanzania.

From 1984 to 1987 he was a Judge of the High Court of Zimbabwe, which operated under Roman Dutch Law.

He resumed his seat on the High Court of Tanzania from 1987 to 1989.

In 1989, he was a member of the Judicial Service Commission.

He was Principal Judge of the High Court of Tanzania from 1989 to 2000.

In 2000, he was appointed Chief Justice of the Judiciary of Tanzania and Chairman of the Judicial Service Commission.

He replaced Chief justice Francis Nyalali, who had retired after holding that office for 23 years.

From 2005 to 2007, he was vice chairperson of the Southern African Judges Commission.

He retired from the bench on 20 July 2007.

He was succeeded by Augustino Ramadhani.

Samatta became Chancellor of Mzumbe University, Tanzania.

== Sources ==
- "Barnabas Samatta", Africa Intelligence, 5 February 2000
- Profiles for Former Judges : Justice Augustino S.L. Ramadhani - United Republic of Tanzania, African Court on Human and Peoples’ Rights, archived from the original on 2020-05-26
- The Hon. Mr Justice (ret'd) B.A. Samatta, Judicial Integrity Group
- Shivji, Issa G.; Majamba, Hamudi (2011), Rule of Law vs. Rulers of Law. Justice Barnabas Albert Samatta's Road To Justice: Justice Barnabas Albert Samatta's Road to Justice, African Books Collective, ISBN 978-9987-08-055-7
