= Garwe =

Garwe is a Zimbabwean surname. Notable people with the surname include:

- Daniel Garwe, Zimbabwean politician
- Paddington Garwe, Zimbabwean jurist
- Trevor Garwe, Zimbabwean cricketer
