= Samatta =

Samatta is a surname. Notable people with the surname include:

- Barnabas A. Samatta (born 1940), Tanzanian lawyer and judge
- Mbwana Samatta (born 1992), Tanzanian footballer
