= Virginia Mabiza =

Zimbabwean lawyer and politician

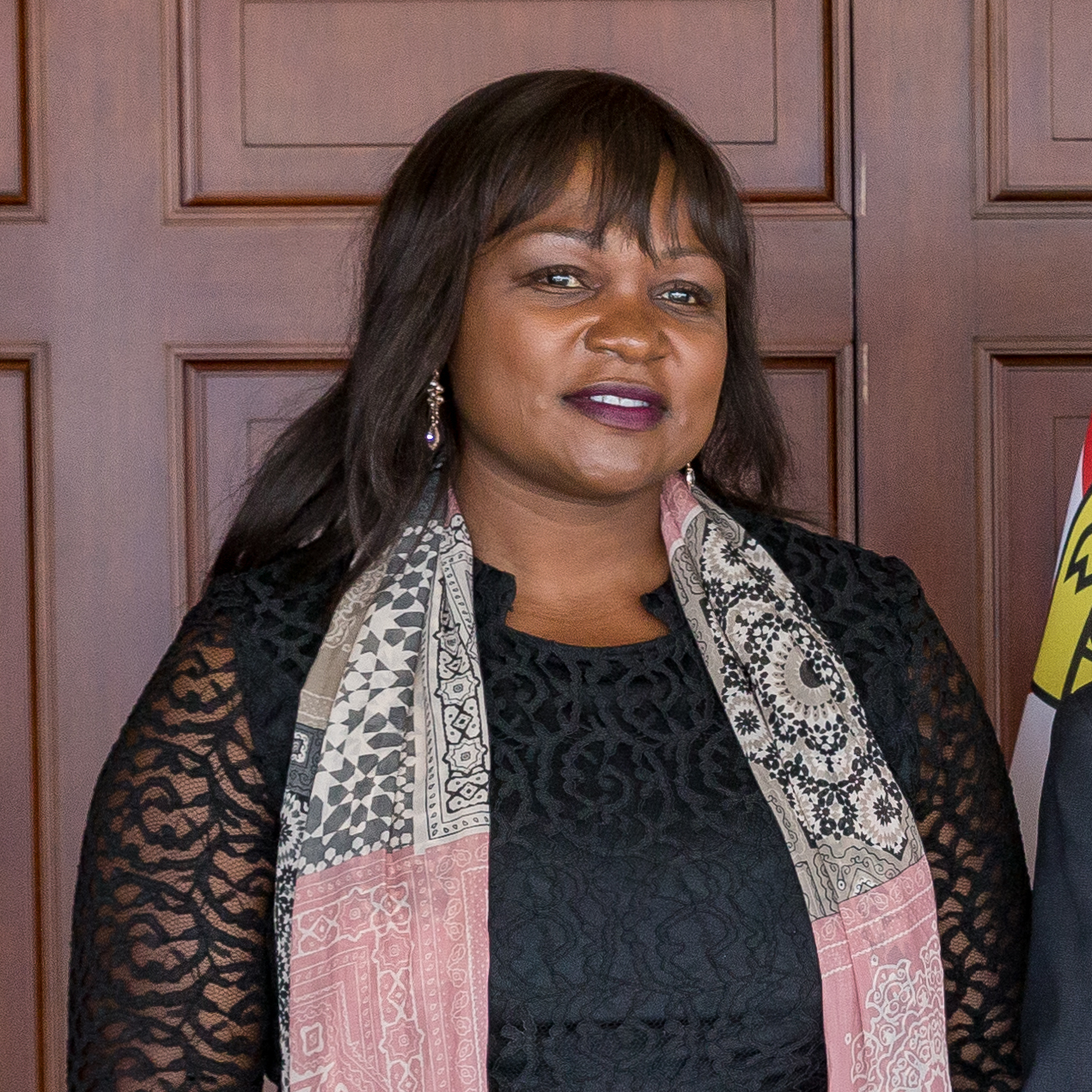
- Education: University of Zimbabwe & Leeds Metropolitan University
- Known for: Permanent Secretary at the Ministry of Justice, Legal and Parliamentary Affairs

Virginia Mabiza, is a Zimbabwean lawyer and politician in Zimbabwe. In 2018 she was permanent secretary at the Ministry of Justice, Legal and Parliamentary Affairs.

== Life ==
Mabiza qualified as a lawyer with an honours degree from the University of Zimbabwe. Her master's degree in leadership and change management is the Leeds Metropolitan University.

In 2016 she was involved with threatening #thisflag protestors. The protests inspired by Pastor involved a social media-inspired strike. Promise Mkwananzi called on protestors to disregard Mabiza who said that the sale or use of the Zimbabwean flag was illegal.

In 2018 she was permanent secretary at the Ministry Of Justice, Legal And Parliamentary Affairs, where Ziyambi Ziyambi was the responsible minister.

Mabiza was involved with delivering the President's promise to the victims of the Gukurahundi massacres. Mabiza said that she would consult with victim's relatives to plan for exhumations and reburials. She would assist with missing birth and death certificates although the actions may require new laws to permit the proposed action.

In 2019 she announced that Zimbabwe was to host an international (WIPO) intellectual property conference. In 2023, Mabiza became the first female Attorney-General of Zimbabwe.
