= Augustine Saidi =

Tanzanian jurist and judge (1929-1995)

Chief Justice of the Judiciary of Tanzania
- In office 1971–1977
- Preceded by: Philip Telford Georges
- Succeeded by: Francis Nyalali

Personal details
- Born: Augustine Bwanachila Saidi; 10 August 1929 Mount Kilimanjaro, Tanganyika
- Died: 19 May 1995 (aged 65)
- Occupation: Lawyer; Judge

Augustine Saidi (19 August 1929 – 19 April 1995), or Augustino B. Saidi, was a Tanzanian lawyer who was the first African Chief Justice of the Judiciary of Tanzania.

== Early years ==
Augustine Saidi was born on 19 August 1929 to Chagga parents. His birthplace was near Mount Kilimanjaro. in modern day Kilimanjaro Region. The future president Julius Nyerere taught Saidi in Tabora when he was attending Tabora secondary school. He completed his secondary education, and then was funded by the Kilimanjaro Native Cooperative Union( KNCU) to continue his studies in India. Although he was a Catholic, he studied at Aligarh Muslim University in India, where he obtained his BA, LLB, and MA degrees. He was a hard working student, who was described by his teachers as exceptional and brilliant. He practiced at the bar in India for a short period, then in 1957 returned to the then British Tanganyika.

== Judicial career ==
Saidi worked as an advocate in Moshi, then joined the magistracy in 1961. He took his place in the High Court in Dar es Salaam on 1 May 1964, at the age of 33. At first he was an Associate Judge of the High Court, a new title created by the Magistrates Court Act to hear appeals from the Primary Courts, which carried the same powers as a standard judge of the High Court. A few months later the title was dropped, and Saidi and his colleague Mark P.K. Kimicha became the first African judges in the High Court. After the Union of Tanganyika and Zanzibar to form Tanzania in 1964, for a short period Saidi was Acting Chief Justice of Zanzibar.

On 30 June 1965 Saidi, Deputy Chief Justice of Zanzibar, conducted First Vice President Abeid Karume, around the Zanzibar Supreme Court. Karume said, "We have not yet introduced new laws that are in keeping with African and Tanzanian traditions, and up to now, in our courts, we still follow British laws." He then said there was no great difference in law, that the British laws were not greatly different from our views, for law is law; it is only the regulations that change, and the people have accepted these laws for they were made in their own interest.

During the Ugandan Gold Scandal, in March 1966 Saidi was a member of a commission chaired by Sir Clement Nageon de L'Estang, vice president of the East African Court of Appeal, that looked into allegations by Daudi Ochieng that the Ugandan prime minister Milton Obote and others including Colonel Idi Amin had received gold, ivory, monies or other property from the Congo, and were conspiring to overthrow the government. Obote only allowed the commission to release enough information to clear the accused of any wrongdoing.

In a 1968 case, Justice Saidi held,

it is quite clear that this traditional custom has outlived its usefulness. The age of discrimination based on sex is long gone, and the world is now in the stage of full equality of all human beings irrespective of their sex, creed, race, or colour. On grounds of natural justice and equity, daughters like sons in every part of Tanzania should be allowed to inherit the property of their deceased fathers, whatever its kind or origin, on the basis of equality.

== Chief Justice ==
In 1971 Chief Justice Philip Telford Georges returned to the Trinidad court after serving as Chief Justice of the Judiciary of Tanzania since 1965. He had stood up for the power of the Judiciary against Julius Nyerere, so there were regrets when he left. Saidi was appointed Chief Justice of the High Court of Tanzania in 1971. He was close to the national leaders, and was appointed at a time when the executive was steadily usurping judicial authority. Nyerere wanted to appoint a Tanzanian as Chief Justice, and Saidi was the natural choice. Some members of the bench, however, were concerned that Saidi would not be strong enough to resist demands from the executive.

The authority and morale of the High Court suffered under Saidi. He was a supporter of the Tanganyika African National Union (TANU) and did not deal effectively with the strains caused by implementation of the government's socialist policies. On 1 November 1975 Saidi swore in Mwalimu Nyere at the State House in Dar es Salaam for another five years in office. He had been elected by 93.2% of voters. Saidi served as Chief Justice until 1977, when he was replaced by Francis Lucas Nyalali.

== Later career ==
In 1983 Saidi was appointed to the Law Reform Commission of Tanzania, chaired by Hamisi Amiri Msumi, which issued its first report on delays in the disposal of civil suits in February 1986.

Augustine Saidi died on 19 April 1995. He was survived by Elizabeth Said. On 5 March 2010 a new building worth 1.3bn/- was inaugurated in Dar es Salaam in honor of Saidi for use by the Supreme Court as an administrative block. Chief Justice Augustino Ramadhani had released funds to be used to refurbish his residence for use in construction of the new building.

== Sources ==
- "Acting CJ sworn in as Chande retires", The Citizen, 19 January 2017
- Baganchwera Barungi (2011), Parliamentary Democracy in Uganda: The Experiment that Failed, AuthorHouse, ISBN 978-1-4567-3591-3
- CIA (1964), "African Jurist", Daily Report, Foreign Radio Broadcasts, United States. Central Intelligence Agency
- CIA (1965), "First Vice President Visits Zanzibar Court", Daily Report, Foreign Radio Broadcasts, United States. Central Intelligence Agency
- Feingold, Ellen R. (2018), Colonial Justice and Decolonization in the High Court of Tanzania, 1920–1971 (PDF), Cambridge Imperial and Post-Colonial Studies Series, Springer International Publishing AG, doi:10.1007/978-3-319-69691-1, ISBN 978-3-319-69691-1
- Hamisi Amiri Msumi (February 1986), Report No. 1 of 1986 on Delays in the Disposal of Civil Suits (PDF), The Law Reform Commission Of Tanzania
- Oloka-Onyango, J. (23 June 2017), When Courts Do Politics: Public Interest Law and Litigation in East Africa, Cambridge Scholars Publishing, ISBN 978-1-4438-6409-1
- Shao, William (27 March 2020), "Mwalimu Nyerere hints at intention of not contesting in 1980 polls", The Citizen
- "THE Judiciary today made a historic event", Daily News, Tanzania Standard Newspapers, 5 March 2010
- Uzoigwe, G. N. (June 1983), "Uganda and Parliamentary Government", The Journal of Modern African Studies, 21 (2), Cambridge University Press: 253–271, doi:10.1017/S0022278X00023260, JSTOR 160775, S2CID 154447743
