= Susan Mavangira =

Zimbabwean judge

Justice of the Supreme Court of Zimbabwe
- Incumbent
- Assumed office 16 September 2015
- Appointed by: Robert Mugabe

Susan Mavangira is a Zimbabwean judge who sits as on the Supreme Court of Zimbabwe.

== See also ==
- List of justices of the Supreme Court of Zimbabwe
