= Elizabeth Gwaunza =

Zimbabwean lawyer and jurist (born 1953)

Honourable Mrs Justice Elizabeth Gwaunza

Chief Justice of Zimbabwe
- Incumbent
- Assumed office 15 May 2026
- Appointed by: Emmerson Mnangagwa
- Deputy: Paddington Garwe
- Preceded by: Luke Malaba

Deputy Chief Justice of the Supreme Court of Zimbabwe
- In office 29 March 2018 – 15 May 2026
- Appointed by: Emmerson Mnangagwa
- Succeeded by: Paddington Garwe

Justice of the Supreme Court of Zimbabwe
- In office November 2002 – 29 March 2018
- Appointed by: Robert Mugabe

Judge of the High Court of Zimbabwe
- In office August 1998 – November 2002
- Appointed by: Robert Mugabe

Personal details
- Born: 15 June 1953 (age 73)
- Education: University of Zimbabwe
- Profession: Judge; lawyer

Elizabeth Gwaunza (born 15 June 1953) is a Zimbabwean lawyer and jurist who has been Chief Justice of Zimbabwe of the Supreme Court of Zimbabwe since May 2026.

== Early life and education ==
Gwaunza was born in 1953. She was born in Masvingo and attended St. Davids Girl School in Bonda, Nyanga, Zimbabwe. She was one of two black female law students who were the first to graduate in Zimbabwe. She has a Diploma in Women's Law from the Women's Law Centre at the University of Zimbabwe and a masters in Women and Gender Development from the Women's University in Africa.

== Career ==
Gwaunza was admitted as a legal practitioner of the High Court of Zimbabwe in 1987. From 1989 until 1995 she co-founded and was the national coordinator of the Women and Law in Southern Africa Research Project. She worked as a director of Legal Aid in the Ministry of Justice and as a director of Legal Affairs in the Ministry of Community Development and Women's Affairs. She was a founding member and former president of the Zimbabwe Association of Women Judges and is a member of the International Association of Women Judges. She has written a number of publications on family and inheritance law.

Gwaunza was appointed a Judge of the High Court by Robert Mugabe in August 1998, and then the Supreme Court in November 2002. She was elected to the International Criminal Tribunal for the former Yugoslavia in 2008. Her appointment was questioned by the International Bar Association given her ties to Mugabe, including the gift of a farm seized from white owners.

Gwaunza was appointed Deputy Chief Justice of the Supreme Court by President Emmerson Mnangagwa in March 2018. She is the second woman to sit on the Supreme Court after Vernanda Ziyambi. In May 2021, the High Court ruled that Mnangagwa's constitutional amendment extending the retirement age of judges from 70 to 75 did not apply to sitting judges, meaning Luke Malaba ceased to be a judge as he turned 70 that week, and the Judicial Service Commission announced Gwaunza was Acting Chief Justice with immediate effect. The government appealed the ruling, and Malaba returned to work while the matter was pending, but skipped most public ceremonies, leaving Gwaunza to preside.

== Selected publications ==
- Gwaunza, Elizabeth C. (1991). "Cultural Practices That Hinder Women's Development". Social Change and Development (26): 15–16.
- Gwaunza, Elizabeth C. (1990). "Social Attitudes - A Hindrance to Women's Advancement!". Southern Africa. 3 (10): 15–19.
- Gwaunza, Elizabeth (1996). The expanding and contracting family in Zimbabwe. University of Michigan. Center for Afroamerican and African Studies.
- Gwaunza, Elizabeth; Chenaux-Repond, Maia (1994). Women & land rights in resttlement [sic] areas in Zimbabwe. Women and Law in Southern Africa Research Project.
- Gwaunza, Elizabeth (2000). "Inheritance rights of women under customary law vis-à-vis international human rights instruments: the case of Zimbabwe". Bringing International Human Rights Law Home: Judicial Colloquium on the Domestic Application of the Convention on the Elimination of All Forms of Discrimination Against Women and the Convention on the Rights of the Child: S. 125–129.
- Stewart, Julie; Sithole, Ellen; Gwaunza, Elizabeth (2001). "Pregnancy and Childbirth: Joy or Despair? Women and Gender-Generated Crimes of Violence". African Studies Review. 50 (2).

== Personal life ==
Gwaunza is married and has a son and a daughter. Her youngest son, Musah, a journalist, died from illness at age 33 in 2016.
