= Sobusa Gula-Ndebele =

Zimbabwean politician (born 1954)

Sobusa Gula-Ndebele (born 1954) is the former Attorney General of Zimbabwe. He was appointed to the position in 2006 by Robert Mugabe, and his mandate was briefly renewed in 2007. However, following ZANU-PF infighting, Gula-Ndebele was placed on a period of suspension in March 2007, before being dismissed from office in May 2008. He was succeeded by Justice Bharat Patel, who served as acting AG until Mugabe appointed Johannes Tomana as the permanent Attorney-General in December.

After independence, he practiced as a lawyer, establishing the law firm Gula-Ndebele and Partners Legal Practitioners. He is a former chairman of the Electoral Supervisory Commission.

In 2018, he was accused, in his capacity as the executor of an estate, by a Gweru woman, Mrs Juliet Mtetwa, of "fraudulently" selling her farm and of depriving her of her right to inherit her late husband's estate as a surviving spouse.
