= Antonia Guvava =

Zimbabwean judge

Justice of the Supreme Court of Zimbabwe
- Incumbent
- Assumed office November 2013
- Appointed by: Robert Mugabe

Antonia Guvava is a Zimbabwean judge who sits as on the Supreme Court of Zimbabwe. She has been a judge since 2001.

In 2019, she was nominated to the African Commission on Human and Peoples' Rights.

== See also ==
- List of justices of the Supreme Court of Zimbabwe
