= Nyalali Commission =

Tanzanian presidential commission on political parties

The Nyalali Commission of February 1991 was a Presidential Commission set up under the leadership of then-Chief Justice Francis Nyalali of Tanzania to collect the views of citizens and make appropriate recommendations on whether the country should adopt a multiparty or single party system. It sat during the term of President Ali Hasan Mwinyi. Based on the reports given by the commission, the Constitution of Tanzania was gradually modified in the following years to accommodate a multi-party system.
