= Constitution of Tanzania =

Supreme law of Tanzania

Constitution of the United Republic of Tanzania

Overview
- Jurisdiction: Tanzania
- Date effective: 16 March 1977
- System: Unitary presidential republic

Government structure
- Branches: Three
- Chambers: Unicameral (National Assembly)
- Executive: President
- Judiciary: Court of Appeal
- Signatories: Constituent Assembly
- Supersedes: Interim Constitution of the United Republic of Tanganyika and Zanzibar

The Constitution of the United Republic of Tanzania, also known as the Permanent Constitution, was ratified in 16 March 1977. Before the current establishment, Tanzania has had three constitutions: the Independence Constitution (1961), the Republican Constitution (1962), and the Interim Constitution of the United Republic of Tanganyika and Zanzibar (1964).

== History ==
=== Independence Constitution (1961–1962) ===
After independence from the United Kingdom, Tanganyika adopted a first constitution based on the Westminster Model (with the exclusion of the Bill of Rights). This defined a Governor General who represented the Queen of Tanganyika, Elizabeth II, to be the formal head of state. The executive was led by the First Minister or the Prime Minister, chosen from the majority party. The constitution also established the independence of the judiciary.

=== Republican Constitution (1962–1964) ===
In 1962, the Tanzanian Parliament (made solely of nominees from the Tanganyika African National Union party) formed itself into a constituent assembly and drastically revised the 1961 constitution, most notably with the establishment of a strongly presidential system. The new President of Tanzania was granted the prerogatives of both former roles, Governor General and First Minister, serving as the head of state as well as commander in chief of the armed forces. He was granted the right to designate the vice president and Ministers, and the right to dismiss the Parliament under certain circumstances. The President also inherited security-related, repressive powers that were formerly of the Governor General, with the addition of new ones; the Preventive Detention Act, for example, gave the President the right to detain any person without trial.

=== Interim Constitution (1964–1977) ===
In 1964, Tanganyika and Zanzibar merged into the United Republic of Tanganyika and Zanzibar, renamed into "United Republic of Tanzania" that same year. The constitution of the newborn nation was based on Tanganyika's 1962 Republican Constitution, modified according to the agreements between TANU and Zanzibar's majority party, the Afro-Shirazi Party (ASP). These agreements had been ratified under the name "Articles of Union", and became part of the new constitution as "Acts of Union". The most notable feature of the Acts of Union was the establishment of the double government structure that is also part of Tanzania's current constitution. This structure included one government for the Union and one largely autonomous independent government for Zanzibar. Zanzibar's government included its own Parliament and President. The President of Zanzibar also served as vice president of the Union.

The constitution of 1964 was adopted ad interim. The Acts of Union themselves included directions on steps to take to elaborate a definitive constitution, to be elaborated by a constituent assembly comprising representatives of both TANU and ASP. This procedure was initiated but was later suspended.

==== Changes in 1965 ====
The Interim Constitution was modified several times after its first layout. A major change was made in 1965 to formalize the one-party nature of the Tanzanian government. Coherent to the double government structure defined in 1964, the 1965 Constitution identified two government parties, TANU for the Union and ASP for Zanzibar.

In the following years, several amendments were added. Those reduced the autonomy of Zanzibar and further strengthened the one-party state. For example, an amendment in 1975 established that all the government institutions, including the Parliament, were subordinate to the party's executive committee. At that time, TANU and ASP were about to merge into the Chama Cha Mapinduzi (CCM), something that happened in 1977.

=== Permanent Constitution (1977-present) ===
One month after CCM was founded, the Permanent Constitution was approved. This Constitution essentially confirmed the main principles of the Republic and Interim Constitutions, i.e., strong presidency, dual government structure, one-party state.

Since 1977, several amendments have been applied to the original Constitution. Many of these are related to the relationship between the united government and the Zanzibar government. In the early 1990s, President of the Union Ali Hassan Mwinyi launched a program of liberal reforms. He nominated a commission (named Nyalali Commission after its president Francis Nyalali) dedicated to preparing the transition to a multi-party political system. Based on the commission's works, several amendments were promulgated. The Eighth Amendment (1992) established that a member of any registered political party could run for any political seat; coherently, new rules were defined governing the parties' registration. The Ninth Amendment reorganized presidential elections and introduced the possibility of impeachment by the Parliament; further, it separated the functions of President and Prime Minister.

The relationships between Zanzibar and the Union were also modified over time. For example, the Eleventh Amendment established the President of Zanzibar and the Union vice president as two different, independent roles.

April 2000: The Thirteenth Constitutional Amendment

It introduced the following changes:

- Prior, a candidate needed 50% of votes in presidential elections to be declared president of the United Republic; only a simple majority is now required to be declared president.
- Before, the President had no power to nominate any body to parliament all members of parliament except the Attorney General, women in special seats and representatives of the Zanzibar House, were elected from constituencies. The Constitutional amendment allowed the President to nominate up to 10 members of parliament.
- Increased the number of special seats from women from 15%- 20%, depending on the declaration of the National Electoral Commission from time to time, with the consent of the President.
