= Paddington Garwe =

Zimbabwean lawyer and jurist

Honourable Mr Justice Paddington Garwe

Deputy Chief Justice of Zimbabwe
- Incumbent
- Assumed office 15 May 2026
- Appointed by: Emmerson Mnangagwa
- Preceded by: Elizabeth Gwaunza

Justice of the Supreme Court of Zimbabwe
- In office 2006 – 15 May 2026
- Appointed by: Robert Mugabe

Judge President of the High Court of Zimbabwe
- In office 2001–2006
- Appointed by: Robert Mugabe

Judge of the High Court of Zimbabwe
- In office 1993–2006
- Appointed by: Robert Mugabe

Personal details
- Education: University of Zimbabwe
- Profession: Judge; lawyer

Paddington Shadreck Garwe is a Zimbabwean jurist who serves as the Deputy Chief Justice of Zimbabwe. He was appointed to the position on 15 May 2026, succeeding Justice Elizabeth Gwaunza. Garwe is also a sitting judge of the Constitutional Court of Zimbabwe and has one of the longest judicial careers in the country's history.

== Early life and education ==
Garwe holds a Bachelor of Laws (LLB) degree from the University of Zimbabwe. He entered the legal profession when the country was still known as Rhodesia, beginning his career as a magisterial assistant in 1978.

== Judicial career ==
Garwe rose rapidly through the ranks of the judiciary. He served as a magistrate and regional magistrate before being appointed Chief Magistrate in 1989. In 1991 he became Permanent Secretary for the Ministry of Justice, Legal and Parliamentary Affairs. In 1993, at the age of 35, he was appointed a judge of the High Court. He later served as Judge President of the High Court from 2001 to 2006. In 2006 he was elevated to the Supreme Court.

In May 2021 he was appointed a judge of the Constitutional Court. On 15 May 2026 he was sworn in as Deputy Chief Justice following the elevation of Justice Elizabeth Gwaunza to Chief Justice. His appointment was widely viewed as a recognition of his extensive experience on both the High Court and appellate benches.

== Notable cases ==
Justice Garwe is known for presiding over the high-profile treason trial of Movement for Democratic Change leader, and later Prime Minister of Zimbabwe, Morgan Tsvangirai and two co-accused in 2004 while serving as a High Court judge. He acquitted the accused in a ruling that was regarded at the time as a significant demonstration of judicial independence amid intense political pressure.

Throughout his career he has adjudicated numerous significant civil, criminal, and commercial cases, particularly during his tenure on the Supreme Court and Constitutional Court.
