= Nobert Mazungunye =

Zimbabwean politician

The Hon. Nobert Mazungunye MP

Deputy Minister of Justice, Legal and Parliamentary Affairs
- Incumbent
- Assumed office 12 September 2023
- President: Emmerson Mnangagwa
- Minister: Ziyambi Ziyambi

Member of Parliament for Mazowe South
- Incumbent
- Assumed office 4 September 2023
- President: Emmerson Mnangagwa
- Preceded by: Fortune Chasi
- Constituency: Mazowe South
- Majority: 9,201 (40.5%)

Personal details
- Party: ZANU-PF

Nobert Mazungunye is a Zimbabwean politician. He is the current Deputy Minister of Justice, Legal and Parliamentary Affairs of Zimbabwe and a member of parliament for Mazowe South. He is the member of ZANU–PF.
