= Bharat Patel =

Justice of the Constitutional Court of Zimbabwe

Justice of the Constitutional Court of Zimbabwe
- Incumbent
- Assumed office 20 May 2021
- Appointed by: Emmerson Dambudzo Mnangagwa

Personal details
- Born: 16 April 1952 (age 74) Salisbury, Southern Rhodesia
- Education: University of Rhodesia; University College London
- Occupation: Lawyer, Judge

Bharatkumar "Bharat" Patel (born 16 April 1952) is a Zimbabwean judge who has served as Justice in the Constitutional Court of Zimbabwe since 20 May 2021.

== Education ==
Patel was born on 16 April 1952 in Salisbury, Southern Rhodesia (today Harare, Zimbabwe). He attended Louis Mountbatten School, a government school in Salisbury. He received his secondary education at two private schools, Peterhouse Boys' School and St. George's College. He completed his legal training at the University of Rhodesia in 1975 and subsequently departed for England, where he qualified as a barrister at Inner Temple and obtained his master's degree in law from University College London.

== Career background ==
Patel began his career in 1978 in the London para-legal sector, with the Greater London Citizens Advice Bureaux Service, focusing on civil rights, employment and social welfare law. In 1982 he returned to Zimbabwe and joined government service as legal counsel performing advisory and representative duties in matters of public law and international law. From 1993, he headed the Division of Legal Advice in the Attorney-General's Office of Zimbabwe until he was appointed to the position of Deputy Attorney General of Zimbabwe in August 2000. In April 2003, he assumed the post of Acting Attorney-General after the resignation of Andrew Chigovera.

In December 2004 Patel was appointed to the bench in the High Court of Zimbabwe, and assumed judicial duties in January 2005. From December 2007 to December 2008 he was temporarily re-appointed to the post of Acting Attorney-General, following the suspension and removal from office of the previous incumbent, Sobuza Gula-Ndebele.

In May 2013 Patel was appointed to the Supreme Court of Zimbabwe as Judge of Appeal. He was simultaneously appointed to the Constitutional Court of Zimbabwe by virtue of certain transitional provisions in the new Constitution of Zimbabwe which came into operation in May 2013. He was sworn in, alongside fellow Justice Ben Hlatshwayo, by President Robert Mugabe at State House in Harare on 22 May 2013.

In May 2020, he was appointed as Acting Judge of the Constitutional Court of Zimbabwe upon the formal separation of that Court from the Supreme Court of Zimbabwe. Subsequently, in May 2021, he was appointed as substantive Judge of the Constitutional Court.

== Publications ==
- "Human Rights and Peoples' Rights in the Post-Colonial Context", UNESCO Meeting of International Experts on Peoples' Rights, Harare, December 1985. Republished in CEDAM Revue – Paix, droits de l'homme, droits des peuples (Special Issue 1991), University of Padua, Padova.
- "Human Rights and Peoples' Rights in the Post-Colonial Context", Legal Forum, Vol. 1, No. 4 (Legal Resources Foundation, Harare, June 1989).
- "Effect in Domestic Law of Treaties to which Zimbabwe is a Party", Legal Forum, Vol. 3, No. 2 (Legal Resources Foundation, Harare, June 1991).
- "The Quest for Oil – Endangering our Natural Heritage", Legal Forum, Vol. 4, No. 3 (Legal Resources Foundation, Harare, September 1992).
- "The Rio Declaration on Environment and Development", Legal Forum, Vol. 5, No. 3 (Legal Resources Foundation, Harare, September 1993).
- "Freedom of Literary Expression in the African Context", Conference on Freedom of Expression, Zimbabwe International Book Fair, Harare, July 1995. Republished in Towards Press Freedom (Konrad-Adenauer-Stiftung/Willie Musarurwa Memorial Trust, Harare, 1996).
- "Freedom of Literary Expression and Censorship in Zimbabwe", Zambezia, Vol. XXIV(i) (University of Zimbabwe, Harare, 1997).
- "The Role of the Legal Adviser in the Internal Application of International Customary and Treaty Law", in Collection of Essays by Legal Advisers on International Law (United Nations, New York, November 1999).
- Chapter 2: "The Legal and Policy Framework of Environmental Management" and Chapter 6: "Implementation of Multilateral Agreements", in Mahomed-Katerere & Chenje (eds), Environmental Law and Policy in Zimbabwe (SARDC, Harare, April 2002).
