= Rita Makarau =

Zimbabwean judge

Justice of the Supreme Court of Zimbabwe
- In office 2006 – 20 May 2021
- Appointed by: Robert Mugabe

Rita Makarau is a Zimbabwean judge who sat on the Supreme Court of Zimbabwe. She left the court in 2021. She was chairperson of the Zimbabwe Electoral Commission (ZEC) until 2017. In 2023, she was appointed Acting Judge of the Supreme Court of Namibia.

== See also ==
- List of justices of the Supreme Court of Zimbabwe
