= Johannes Tomana =

Zimbabwean attorney (1967–2023)

Johannes Tomana (9 September 1967 – 6 August 2023) was a Zimbabwean attorney. He served as Prosecutor-General of Zimbabwe from November 2013 until his dismissal in June 2017.

== Biography ==
Tomana was originally appointed after the prosecuting and government advisory roles of the Attorney General were split under the new Constitution which came into effect in 2013. Previously he served as the Attorney-General, having been appointed to the position by Robert Mugabe on 18 December 2008. He previously served as deputy Attorney-General under Sobusa Gula-Ndebele from 2006 to May 2008. Gula-Ndebele was dismissed from his post following infighting within the ZANU-PF. Bharat Patel served as acting Attorney-General from May to December 2008. Tomana was a member of Zimbabwe's Anti-Corruption Commission from 2005 on.

Tomana's appointment in December 2008 was made (together with the appointment of the Governor of the Reserve Bank of Zimbabwe, Gideon Gono) without consulting the Movement for Democratic Change (MDC), the other part of the Zimbabwean inclusion government. It is heavily debated by the MDC.

Tomana was placed on the United States sanctions list in 2010.

== Death ==
Tomana died on 6 August 2023, at the age of 55 from undisclosed causes.
