= High Court of Tanzania =

In 1964 Tanganyika and Zanzibar formed the United Republic of Tanzania. After the Treaty of the Union, the two countries continued to remain with their own legal systems including court structures. In the 1977 Constitution of the United Republic of Tanzania, the High Court of Tanganyika whose jurisdiction was and still is territoriality limited to Tanzania Mainland (formerly Tanganyika) was called the High Court of Tanzania and the High Court of Zanzibar retained its original name. The High Court of Tanzania only has territorial jurisdiction over legal issues arising in Mainland Tanzania and the High Court of Zanzibar has territorial jurisdiction over legal issues arising in Zanzibar.

The Courts in the United Republic of Tanzania are arranged in a simple and clear hierarchy containing superior courts and subordinate courts and a special constitutional court, which is formed only when there is a constitutional dispute arising between Zanzibar and Tanzania Mainland. In the history of the Union of Zanzibar and Tanganyika a special Constitutional court has never been formed, despite open disagreements on the interpretation and nature of the Union. The Courts of the United Republic of Tanzania are established by the Constitution and municipal laws of Zanzibar and Tanzania Mainland. In Tanzania Mainland, the High Court of Tanzania has three divisions, namely the Commercial Division (the Commercial Court), the Land Division (the Land Court) and the Labour Division (the Labour Court).

On the other hand, Zanzibar only has one division of its High Court but is establishing a Commercial Division of the High Court of Zanzibar. The High Court of Zanzibar has a registry in Pemba and in Zanzibar, however, the registry in Pemba does not have a resident judge. The High Court of Tanzania has registries in Dar es Salaam, Moshi, Tanga, Arusha, Iringa, Bukoba, Dodoma, Mwanza, Mbeya, Mtwara, Tabora and all the registries have resident judges.

== The Court of Appeal of the United Republic of Tanzania ==
The highest court of the United Republic of Tanzania is the Court of Appeal of the United Republic Tanzania which is a true union institution in that it has territorial jurisdiction over appeals arising from the High Court of Tanzania and the High Court of Zanzibar.

== Divisions of the High Court of Tanzania ==
The Commercial Court handles all commercial disputes. This Court was established through amendment of the High Court Registries Rules of 1984. The main objective of establishing this court was to ensure efficient management and expeditious disposal of commercial disputes so as to encourage business development under a free market economy and also growth of foreign investments.

The Labour Court is responsible for hearing and determining employment disputes. It was first inaugurated and launched in June 2007 under the Employment and Labour Relations Act.

The Land Court was established as a result of the land reforms which were implemented by the Land Act 1999. Until 2010, the Land Court had exclusive jurisdiction to determine land disputes relating to land with a pecuniary value of TZS 50,000 or more. Due to lack of sufficient manpower, including judges and the large number of cases being filed in the Land Court, the efficient and timely disposal of cases was negatively impacted. Consequently, in 2010, the Chief Justice of Tanzania, Augustino Ramadhani CJ, extended the jurisdiction to deal with land cases to all judges of the High Court.

== History ==
The High Court of Tanzania is established under article 108(1) of the Constitution of the United Republic of Tanzania. It is the predecessor to the High Court of Tanganyika and later Tanzania, which was established under article 17 (1) of the Tanganyika order in council, 1920.

The High Court is described as a superior court having full jurisdiction by virtue of section 2 (1) of the Judicature and Application of Laws Act, chapter 358 RE:2002. It has now developed forming a different structure to the former, where it has the ordinary court, and the two special divisions that is Commercial Division and Labour Division. However it is subject to the Jurisdiction of the Court of Appeal as stipulated under the constitution and any other written laws.

The court is also known as a court of record where it is required to keep records of its own proceedings and that it may fine or imprison but also as a court of admiralty it can adjudicate disputes arising in the high seas and inland waters.

== Composition ==
Having its base from the constitution of the United Republic of Tanzania, the High Court of Tanzania is composed of the principal judge and not less than 30 other judges.

Judges of the High Court as provided by the Constitution are appointed by the President of the United Republic of Tanzania, in pursuant to the special qualifications stated in its article 109 (7) after consultation with the Judicial Service Commission established under part iii of the constitution. Formally the judges of the court were required to be not less than 15, compared to the recent changes of a composition of not less than 30 judges.

The principal judge is a special assistant of the Chief Justice in the administration of the High court and courts which are subordinate to it. Provided under article 109 (3) of the Constitution of the United Republic of Tanzania. In addition to his ordinary power as a judge of the High Court, the principal judge is also empowered to perform all such duties and functions which in accordance with legal traditions applicable are matters to be performed by the head of the High Court.

Assessors can be simply regarded as a panel of experts in determining an issue before the court. Assessors in the divisions of the High Court are selected from a list of experts submitted to the court by the specific court users committee and have to be knowledgeable in the field concerning the suit. Under section 27 (4) of the Magistrates Courts Act it provides that in any appeal a rule of customary law is in issue or relevant the High Court may refer any question of Customary law to a panel of experts and Also in section 265 of the Criminal Procedure Act 1985 it stipulates that all criminal trials before the court shall be with aid of two or more assessors as the court thinks fit.

The divisions of the court are also properly constituted when presided over by a single judge sitting with two assessors; however where both parties to the case agree the judge in the commercial court can hear their case without aid of assessors.

== Jurisdiction ==
The high court by virtue of section 2 (1) of the Judicature and Application of Laws Act is vested with full and unlimited Jurisdiction over all civil and criminal matters, that is to say it shall have power over any matter not expressly provided by the law the constitution or any other law. It is also provided further under article 108(2) of the constitution of the United Republic of Tanzania. Such Jurisdiction is subject to the jurisdiction of the Court of Appeal as stipulated under the constitution and any other written laws.

In the light of article 108(2) of the constitution of the united republic and the provisions of the Judicature and Application of laws Act, the high court has original jurisdiction over all matters that are outside the jurisdiction of the courts subordinate to it. For example, proceedings where the value of the subject matter exceeds that of the district or resident magistrate courts, such cases are to be tried by the High Court. The High court also has original jurisdiction over all naval affairs or admiral matters.

The high court has also exclusive original jurisdiction over all offences that are not triable by subordinate courts. The majority of these offences either carry capital punishment or life imprisonment, such offences include murder, manslaughter, infanticide, treason, inciting to mutiny and various other offences.

The high court is vested with the appellate power in regard to determining matters submitted to it from subordinate courts, such an appeal may be from the Resident magistrate court or the district court. An appeal to the high court can be on points of law or on points of facts, or on both facts and law. An appeal can also be civil or criminal. Section 72 of the civil procedure code states that "where a case is heard by a bench of two or more judges the appeal shall be decided in accordance with the opinion of the majority of such judges".

== Powers ==
=== Review ===
The law allows any person who is aggrieved by any decision or order from which an appeal is allowed but no appeal has been made to apply for review of the order or decision made by a magistrate who passed the judgement. Review may also be applied for in circumstances where the party has no right to appeal so that a court can reverse its decision. According to the Order 42 rule 1(b) of the civil procedure code the applicant for review has to show to the court the discovery of new or important matters or evidence. The judge to whom the application is made is free to alter the decision as desired.

A good example was in the case of Paul lema v Wilson chuwa (1989) where a high court judge reviewed his own order made in a matter arising from a suit to resist the sale of a house in a public auction. In an appeal the Court of Appeal held that a judge has power to review his own decision, but has no power to take a second look at his own decision given after review.

=== Supervision and revision ===
The high court is vested with general powers of supervision and revision over all districts courts and courts of resident Magistrates in the exercise of their appellate jurisdiction on matters originating from primary courts as well as in exercising their original jurisdiction. Where in exercise of such repower the high court may either call to inspect the record of any proceedings, direct any district court to call for and inspect the records of any proceedings in a primary court, or it can itself revise any such proceedings.

Under the magistrate courts act if in any proceedings of a civil nature where it appears that there has been an error material to the merits of the case involving injustices, the high court may revise the proceedings and make such decision as it sees fit.

== Conclusion ==
Conclusively in the case of Northern Tanzania Farmers Coop society Ltd v Shelukindo the court stated that "The high court is an organ deriving its establishment and existence by the operation of the constitution of this country. This organ unless otherwise expressly restricted by the legislature has unlimited criminal and civil jurisdiction, pecuniary and territorial jurisdiction apart from the court of appeal, it is the highest court for the administration of justice in this country.
