= Lavender Makoni =

Zimbabwean judge

Judge of the Supreme Court of Zimbabwe
- Incumbent
- Assumed office 11 May 2018
- Appointed by: Emmerson Mnangagwa

Judge of the High Court of Zimbabwe
- In office 2002–2018

Lavender Makoni is a Zimbabwean judge currently serving as a justice of the Supreme Court of Zimbabwe. She served as a judge in Zimbabwe's High Court from 2002 to 2018, when she was appointed to the Supreme Court.
