= Francis Nyalali =

4th Chief Justice of Tanzania

Francis Lucas Nyalali

4th Chief Justice of the Judiciary of Tanzania
- In office 1977–2000
- President: Julius Nyerere
- Preceded by: Augustine Saidi
- Succeeded by: Barnabas Samatta

Chairman of the Nyalali Commission
- In office 1991–2002

Personal details
- Born: 3 February 1935 Kasubuya, Mwanza, Tanganyika Territory
- Died: 2 April 2003 (aged 68) Dar es Salaam, Tanzania
- Occupation: Lawyer; Judge

Francis Lucas Nyalali (3 February 1935 – 2 April 2003) was the Chief Justice of the Judiciary of Tanzania from 1977 to 2000.

In 1991, he chaired the Nyalali Commission, a presidential body tasked with reviewing Tanzania's political system. The commission's recommendations included multi-party politics and reassessing the union between Tanganyika and Zanzibar.
