= Attorney-General of Zimbabwe =

(in other official languages)
Northern Ndebele	UGqwethanhloko
Shona	Gweta Guru reHurumende

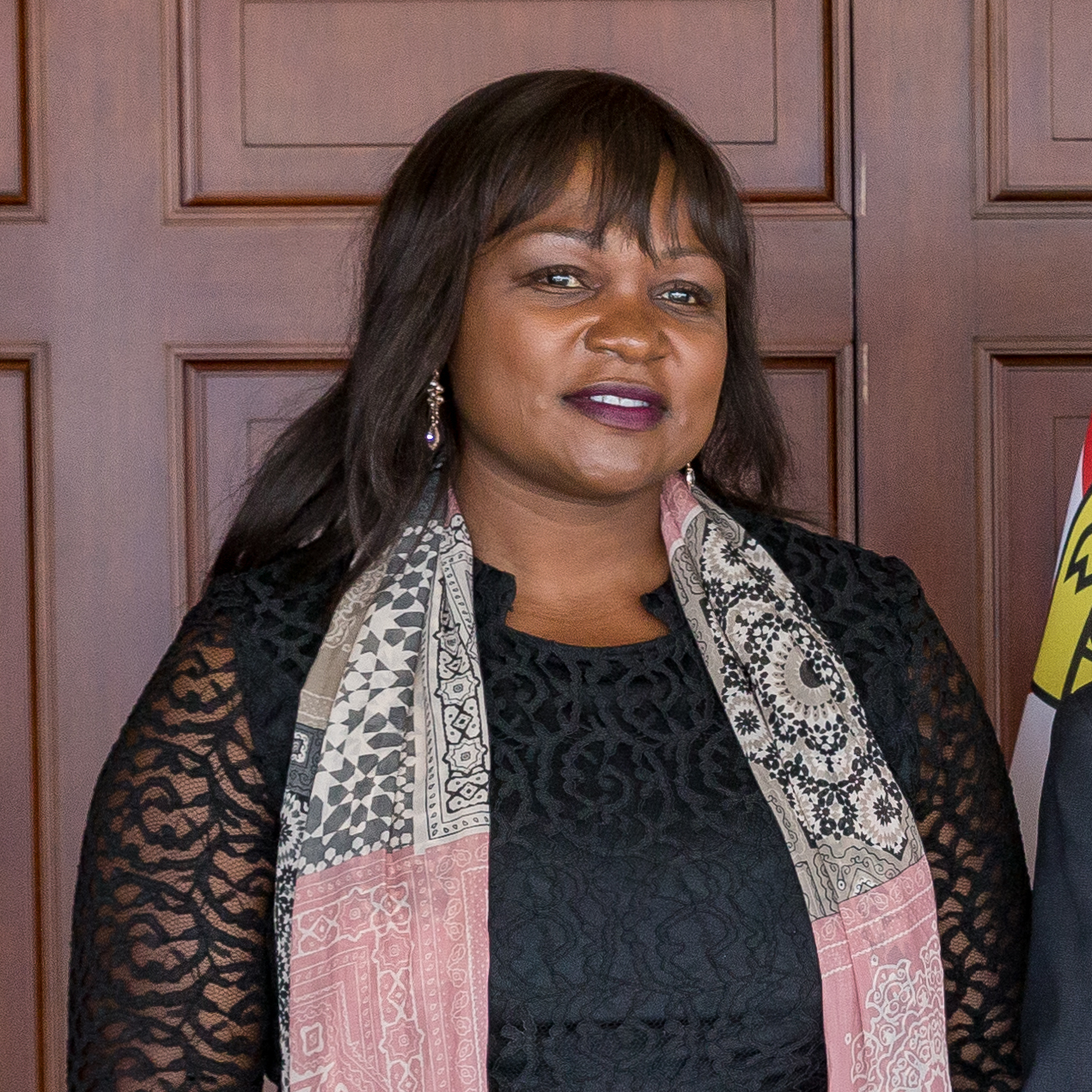
- Incumbent; Virginia Mabiza since 1 November 2023
- Ministry of Justice, Legal and Parliamentary Affairs
- Style: The Honourable
- Member of: Cabinet of Zimbabwe; Parliament of Zimbabwe; Judicial Service Commission
- Reports to: The President
- Seat: Mgandane Dlodlo Building, Harare
- Appointer: The President
- Term length: No fixed term
- Constituting instrument: Constitution of Zimbabwe
- Precursor: Minister of Justice
- Inaugural holder: Ahmed Ebrahim
- Formation: 1980
- Website: attorneygeneral.org.zw

The Attorney-General of Zimbabwe is the principal legal adviser to the Government of Zimbabwe, falling under the Ministry of Justice, Legal and Parliamentary Affairs. The office is established by section 114 of the Constitution of Zimbabwe (2013). The Attorney-General represents the Government in civil and constitutional proceedings, drafts legislation on behalf of the Government, promotes and upholds the rule of law, and defends the public interest.

Unlike in some other common-law jurisdictions, criminal prosecutions in Zimbabwe are the responsibility of the independent National Prosecuting Authority, headed by the Prosecutor-General, following reforms introduced by the 2013 Constitution. Historically the Attorney-General sat as a member of the Senate, but under the current Constitution may sit and speak in either the Senate or the National Assembly, but may not vote. The Attorney-General may also attend Cabinet - but has no vote on Cabinet matters - and, with the leave of the court concerned, appear as a friend of the court in any civil proceedings to which the Government is not a party.

== History ==
The office of Attorney-General was established at Zimbabwe's independence in 1980. Ahmed Ebrahim, appointed by Prime Minister Robert Mugabe, was the first Attorney-General of Zimbabwe. In the early years, the Attorney-General combined the roles of principal legal adviser to the Government and head of public prosecutions. As such, the Attorney-General had responsibility for instituting or conducting criminal prosecutions on behalf of the State.

The 2013 Constitution fundamentally reformed the office. Criminal prosecutorial functions were transferred to the newly created National Prosecuting Authority, headed by a Prosecutor-General, to enhance the independence and impartiality of prosecutions. The Attorney-General's role was refocused on government legal advice, civil and constitutional litigation, legislative drafting, and upholding the rule of law. The Prosecutor-General, however, is independent, subject only to the Constitution and the law, and holds office for a six-year term (renewable once). The separation was intended to insulate prosecutorial decisions from executive influence. In November 2013, the then-Attorney-General Johannes Tomana was appointed the first Prosecutor-General, and the post of Attorney-General remained vacant until the appointment of Prince Machaya in February 2015. Machaya had been serving as Deputy Attorney-General during this vacancy.

The Attorney-General's Office Act [Chapter 7:19] (Act No. 4 of 2011) provides for the administration of the Office, the establishment of an Attorney-General's Office Board, conditions of service for officers, and related matters.

== Role and functions ==
Section 114(4) of the Constitution sets out the functions of the Attorney-General:

- to act as the principal legal adviser to the Government;
- to represent the Government in civil and constitutional proceedings;
- to draft legislation on behalf of the Government;
- to promote, protect and uphold the rule of law and to defend the public interest; and
- to exercise any other functions that may be assigned by an Act of Parliament.

The Attorney-General may perform these functions personally or through subordinate officers. The Attorney-General may also appear as a friend of the court (amicus curiae) in civil proceedings to which the Government is not a party, with the leave of the court.

== Appointment, qualifications, tenure and removal ==
The Attorney-General is appointed by the President. A person is qualified for appointment if qualified for appointment as a judge of the High Court. The Attorney-General takes the oaths of loyalty and office before assuming office.

The President may remove the Attorney-General from office at any time. There is no fixed term of office.

== List of attorneys-general ==
No.	Name	Took office	Left office	Party	Appointed by
1	Ahmed Ebrahim	1980	1982	ZANU–PF	Canaan Banana
2	Godfrey Chidyausiku	1982	1989	ZANU–PF	Canaan Banana
3	Patrick Chinamasa	26 April 1989	2000	ZANU–PF	Robert Mugabe
4	Andrew Chigovera	July 2000	April 2003	ZANU–PF	Robert Mugabe
–	Bharat Patel; Acting	April 2003	2006		Robert Mugabe
5	Sobusa Gula-Ndebele	2006	15 December 2007	ZANU–PF	Robert Mugabe
–	Bharat Patel; Acting	May 2008	December 2008		Robert Mugabe
6	Johannes Tomana	3 March 2009	November 2013	ZANU–PF	Robert Mugabe
Following the implementation of the new Constitution in 2013, the prosecuting powers of the Attorney-General were transferred to the new office of Prosecutor-General. Tomana was appointed to the new role of Prosecutor-General, and the office of Attorney-General remained vacant until the appointment of Machaya in February 2015. During this time, Machaya had been acting Attorney-General.					Robert Mugabe
7	Prince Machaya	25 February 2015	October 2023	ZANU–PF	Robert Mugabe
8	Virginia Mabhiza	1 November 2023			Emmerson Mnangagwa
