= Happyton Bonyongwe =

Zimbabwean spymaster

Retired Major General Happyton Bonyongwe

Minister of Justice, Legal and Parliamentary Affairs
- In office 9 October 2017 – 27 November 2017
- President: Robert Mugabe
- Preceded by: Emmerson Mnangagwa
- Succeeded by: Ziyambi Ziyambi

Director General of the Central Intelligence Organisation
- In office 2002 – 9 October 2017
- President: Robert Mugabe
- Deputy: Aaron Daniel Nhepera
- Preceded by: Elisha Muzonzini

Major General in the Zimbabwe National Army
- In office 1981–1999
- President: Robert Mugabe

Commander in the Zimbabwe African National Liberation Army

Personal details
- Born: 11 January 1960 (age 66) Chikomba (District), Rhodesia and Nyasaland
- Party: ZANU-PF
- Spouse: Willia Bonyongwe
- Occupation: Lawyer

Happyton Mabhuya Bonyongwe is a retired army general who briefly served as Minister of Justice, Legal and Parliamentary Affairs in the cabinet of Zimbabwe from October to November 2017.

== Background ==
Prior to this he was the director general of the Zimbabwean government intelligence agency, the Central Intelligence Organisation (CIO) from 2002 to 2017. He is a retired Brigadier in the Zimbabwe National Army. As Director General of the CIO he reported directly to president Robert Mugabe, bypassing the Minister for Security. He was appointed Minister of Justice, Legal and Parliamentary Affairs on 9 October 2017 and he was sworn in on the 10th of October 2017, thereby vacating his CIO post in line with the constitution.

Bonyongwe replaced Emmerson Mnangagwa who previously served as head of the intelligence agency. Mnangagwa had held both posts of Minister of Justice and First Vice President at the same time. In a cabinet reshuffle in October 2017, Mnangagwa's ministerial position was given to Bonyongwe. After the 2017 Zimbabwean coup d'etat, Mnangagwa was sworn in as Zimbabwe's 3rd president but did not retain Bonyongwe as Minister of Justice.

Since 2008, Bonyongwe is placed on the United States sanctions list.

== See also ==
- Joint Operations Command
