= Anthony Gubbay =

Zimbabwean Judge

Anthony Ray Gubbay (born 26 April 1932) is the former Chief Justice of the Supreme Court of Zimbabwe. He served in the position from 1990 to 2001, when he was forced to take early retirement and replaced by Godfrey Chidyausiku.

He was previously a Supreme Court judge (1983–1990), High Court judge (1977–1983), and advocate in a private practice in 1974.

In 1994 he was awarded an Honorary Doctorate from University of Essex.

== Personal life ==
He married Alice Wilma Sanger in 1962, and has two sons. He currently resides in Vancouver. Anthony Gubbay has Jewish ancestry.
