= John Lewis (judge) =

John Vernon Radcliffe Lewis (14 February 1917 – 4 May 1993) was a Southern Rhodesian and Zimbabwean lawyer and judge.

He was the son of the judge Vernon Arthur Lewis. He was educated at Balliol College, Oxford.

He was appointed to the High Court of Southern Rhodesia in 1960, first as a puisne judge, then as a judge of appeal in 1970. He continued to serve on the bench after the transition to majority rule on the High Court of Zimbabwe. In 1980, he briefly served as acting Chief Justice, like his father had done.
