= George Chiweshe =

Retired Brigadier General George Mutandwa Chiweshe (born June 5, 1953) was once the Chairperson of the Zimbabwe Electoral Commission. He was born in family of four. One of his brothers passed on and he has one surviving brother and elder sister who lives in Mutare. Justice Chiweshe left ZEC to become High Judge and rose to be the High court Judge President. He was in recent years appointed as a Supreme Court Judge by President Mnangagwa.

== Biography ==
He was born in the Mazowe district of Mashonaland Central, just northeast of Harare. Chiweshe attended Tendayi Primary School in 1961 and subsequently Fletcher Secondary School in 1969. Chiweshe obtained his law degree at the University of Zimbabwe in 1988.

Chiweshe joined ZANLA in 1975 after fleeing from the then University of Rhodesia as a law student. He trained in Mozambique. Chiweshe deputised the retired Zimbabwe National Army General Constantine Dominic Guvheya Nyikadzino Chiwenga; and commanded to the likes of the late Zimbabwean hero Brigadier General Charles Tigwe Gumbo. His nom de guerre was "Yasser Arafat." Chiweshe rose through the ranks to political commissar. After independence, Chiweshe joined the Ministry of Justice as a prosecutor in 1980 and became a magistrate three years later. He later joined the Zimbabwe National Army in April 1983 as a major and rose through the ranks from Major to Brigadier General (Judge Advocate General) in 1996. Chiweshe retired from the army in April 2001 after being appointed to the bench by President Robert Gabriel Mugabe.

In September 2004 Chiweshe was appointed Chairman of the Delimitation Commission of Zimbabwe by Mugabe, a move that was criticised by the opposition Movement for Democratic Change as a ploy by ZANU PF to rig the March 2005 parliamentary elections. In January 2005, Chiweshe was appointed Chairman of the new Zimbabwe Electoral Commission (a body that supervises and co-ordinates all elections in Zimbabwe), where he presently serves.

Since 2005, he is placed on the United States sanctions list.

In May 2010, President Mugabe swore in George Chiweshe, former chairman of the Zimbabwe Electoral Commission as Judge President. This appointment brought about massive protests by the Movement for Democratic Change (MDC) led by former Prime Minister the late Morgan Richard Tsvangirai.
