= Philip Telford Georges =

Tanzania judge

Philip Telford Georges, OCC, DAH was Chief Justice of the Judiciary of Tanzania from 1965 to 1971, and several other appellate positions.

He was born to John Henry Duport Georges and Milutine Cox and in Roseau, Dominica on January 5, 1923.

== Education ==
University of Toronto and Middle Temple, London. Honorary Doctor of Laws (Toronto, Dar es Salaam, West Indies).

== Career ==
1. Public defender, Trinidad Bar 1947
2. Judge, Trinidad Bench 1962–1965
3. Chief Justice, High Court of Tanzania, 1965–1971
4. Professor of Law, University of West Indies 1974–1981
5. Judge, Supreme Court of Zimbabwe, 1981–1983
6. Chief Justice, Supreme Court of Zimbabwe, 1983–1984
7. Chief Justice, Supreme Court of the Bahamas, 1984–1989
8. Judge, Court of Appeal, Cayman Islands since 1985
9. Judge, Court of Appeal, Seychelles since 1987
10. Judge, Court of Appeal, Bermuda since 1990

== Death ==
Justice Georges died on 13 January 2005. He was 82.
