= Hector Macdonald (judge) =

Rhodesian judge

Chief Justice of Zimbabwe

Chief Justice of Rhodesia

Hector Norman Macdonald (3 November 1915 – 30 January 2011) was a Rhodesian judge who served as the country's Chief Justice from 1977 to 1980.

Born in Bulawayo, Macdonald became a High Court judge in 1958, continued to serve following the Unilateral Declaration of Independence in 1965, and succeeded Sir Hugh Beadle as Chief Justice 12 years later. As the sitting Chief Justice at the time of the 1979 Lancaster House Agreement, following which the country came under interim British control before receiving full independence as Zimbabwe, Macdonald administered the oath of office to Robert Mugabe, the first Prime Minister of the reconstituted country, in April 1980. Macdonald retired and left the country a month later, moving to South Africa. He died in Rondebosch, Cape Town, in 2011 at the age of 95.
