= John Fieldsend =

Sir John Charles Rowell Fieldsend KBE, QC (13 September 1921 – 22 February 2017) was a judge who served as the first Chief Justice of Zimbabwe. He also served as a judge in several British overseas territories.

== Early life ==
Fieldsend was the son of C. E. Fieldsend MC, a British engineer who moved to Africa with his family in the 1920s. He was educated at Michaelhouse and Rhodes University, where he studied Law. During the Second World War, he was commissioned into the Royal Artillery in 1943, serving in Egypt, Italy (where he fought at Monte Cassino) and Greece.

After demobilisation, Fieldsend was called to the Southern Rhodesian bar in 1947 and entered private practice, becoming a Queen's Counsel (QC) in 1959. Between 1958 and 1963, he was the President of the Special Income Tax Court of the Federation of Rhodesia and Nyasaland.

== Judicial career ==
In 1963, Fieldsend was appointed to the High Court of Southern Rhodesia. In 1965, as a member of the Appellate Division of the High Court, he was the sole dissenter in Madzimbamuto v Lardner-Burke, a challenge to the legality of Southern Rhodesia's Unilateral Declaration of Independence (UDI) earlier that year. He wrote that "while the present authorities are factually in control of all executive and legislative powers in Rhodesia, they have not usurped the judicial function. For this reason they are neither a fully de facto nor a de jure Government".

In 1968, Justice Fieldsend resigned from the bench after the High Court dismissed the applications for stays of execution by three black Rhodesians convicted of murder and terrorist offences before UDI, stating that his continuation in office "amounts to accepting the abandonment of the 1961 Constitution".

After his resignation, Fieldsend left Rhodesia for the United Kingdom, where he worked for the Law Commission, serving as its secretary from 1978 to 1980. That year, he was invited by Robert Mugabe to become the first Chief Justice of the now-independent Zimbabwe, serving until 1987.

He then served as the Chief Justice of the Turks and Caicos Islands from 1985 to 1987, and as Chief Justice of the British Indian Ocean Territory from 1987 to 1999. He also served as a judge of the Court of Appeal of St Helena, of the Falkland Islands and of the British Antarctic Territory from 1985 to 1999, and of the Court of Appeal of Gibraltar between 1985 and 1997 (serving as its President from 1991 to 1997).

Fieldsend was appointed a Knight Commander of the Order of the British Empire (KBE) in 1998.

== Family ==
In 1945, he married Muriel Gedling, a schoolteacher; they had a son, Peter, and daughter, Catherine Ann.
