= Ministry of Justice, Legal and Parliamentary Affairs =

Government ministry of Zimbabwe

Ministry overview
- Jurisdiction: Government of Zimbabwe
- Headquarters: Mgandane Dlodlo Building, Corner Samora Machel Avenue & Simon Muzenda Street, Harare; 17.825340785619556°S 31.053217201452863°E
- Minister responsible: Ziyambi Ziyambi, Minister of Justice, Legal and Parliamentary Affairs
- Deputy Minister responsible: Nobert Mazungunye, Deputy Minister of Justice, Legal and Parliamentary Affairs
- Ministry executive: Vimbai Nyemba, Permanent Secretary
- Child Ministry: Attorney-General of Zimbabwe
- Website: justice.gov.zw

The Ministry of Justice, Legal and Parliamentary Affairs is a government ministry, responsible for courts in Zimbabwe. The incumbent minister is Ziyambi Ziyambi and the deputy minister is Nobert Mazungunye. Vimbai Nyemba is the permanent secretary.

== List of ministers ==
- Eddison Zvobgo (18 April 1982 – 18 April 1985)
- Emmerson Mnangagwa (1989 – July 2000)
- Patrick Chinamasa (July 2000 – 11 September 2013)
- Emmerson Mnangagwa (11 September 2013 – 9 October 2017)
- Happyton Bonyongwe (9 October 2017 – 2 November 2017)
- Ziyambi Ziyambi (since 2 November 2017)
