= Chief Justice of Zimbabwe =

Chief judge of the Supreme Court of Zimbabwe

(in other official languages)
Northern Ndebele	Indunankulu yabeHluleli
Shona	Mukuru wevatongi
- Coat of arms of Zimbabwe
- Incumbent; Elizabeth Gwaunza since 15 May 2026
- Style: Honourable
- Appointer: President of Zimbabwe
- Term length: No term limit; must retire at 70, unless allowed to continue to 75 by the President
- Constituting instrument: Constitution of Zimbabwe
- Inaugural holder: Sir Murray Bisset (Chief Justice of Southern Rhodesia); Sir John Fieldsend (Chief Justice of Zimbabwe)
- Formation: 1927 (Southern Rhodesia); 18 April 1980 (Zimbabwe)
- Deputy: Paddington Garwe

The Chief Justice of Zimbabwe is the chief judge of the Supreme Court of Zimbabwe and the head of the Zimbabwean judiciary. The position is established under the Constitution of Zimbabwe (2013) and carries significant administrative, judicial, and ceremonial responsibilities. The Chief Justice presides over the Supreme Court, which serves as the final court of appeal in non-constitutional matters, and holds supervisory authority over the entire judiciary.

The office traces its origins to the colonial period, when the Supreme Court of Southern Rhodesia was established in 1927. Since then, 14 individuals have served as Chief Justice, including eight during the Southern Rhodesia and Rhodesia eras. Following Zimbabwe's independence in 1980, the role continued under the new constitutional framework. The current Chief Justice is Elizabeth Gwaunza, who was appointed on 15 May 2026, becoming the first woman to hold the position.

== History ==
The Supreme Court of Southern Rhodesia was established in 1927, with Sir Murray Bisset appointed as its first Chief Justice. During the colonial and Rhodesia periods (1927–1980), the court operated under the prevailing constitutional arrangements, with the Chief Justice serving as the head of the judiciary in a system that evolved from British colonial models.

Following independence on 18 April 1980, the judiciary was restructured under the new constitutional order. The Supreme Court retained its position as the apex court for most appeals. The 2013 Constitution introduced further reforms, including the creation of a separate Constitutional Court with final authority on constitutional matters, while affirming the Chief Justice's overarching role as head of the judiciary and supervisor of both the Constitutional Court and the Supreme Court.

The position has seen a mix of continuity and change in terms of the demographics of officeholders. Of the six Chief Justices since independence, three have been White Zimbabweans and three Black Zimbabweans. Elizabeth Gwaunza's appointment in 2026 marked a historic milestone as the first woman to serve in the role.

== Appointment and tenure ==
The Chief Justice is appointed by the President of Zimbabwe on the advice of the Judicial Service Commission (JSC). The JSC prepares a list of three qualified nominees following a transparent process involving advertisement, nominations, and interviews. The President selects one nominee from the list.

To be eligible, a candidate must be a Zimbabwean citizen qualified to practise as a legal practitioner for at least ten years or possess equivalent judicial or academic experience. The Chief Justice must take the judicial oath before assuming office.

Judges of the Supreme Court, including the Chief Justice, hold office until they reach the age of 70. A Chief Justice who reaches this age may, before attaining it, elect to continue in office for an additional period (typically up to five years), subject to submission of a medical report confirming mental and physical fitness, consultation with the JSC, and approval by the President.

Removal from office is possible only for inability, incompetence, or misconduct, following an inquiry by a tribunal appointed by the President on the advice of the JSC.

== Role and powers ==
The Chief Justice is the head of the judiciary and exercises general powers of supervision over all subordinate courts and judicial officers. She presides over the Supreme Court and may assign judges to specific matters or jurisdictions. The Chief Justice also performs functions assigned by the Constitution or by an Act of Parliament.

=== Ceremonial duties ===
The Chief Justice traditionally administers the oath of office to the President and Vice-Presidents of Zimbabwe upon their assumption of office.

=== Administrative responsibilities ===
As head of the judiciary, the Chief Justice chairs or plays a leading role in the Judicial Service Commission and oversees the efficient administration of justice across the court system. This includes ensuring the independence, impartiality, and effectiveness of the courts.

=== Judicial leadership ===
The Chief Justice leads the business of the Supreme Court, presides over oral arguments in significant cases, and participates in the assignment of cases. While all Supreme Court justices have equal voting power, the Chief Justice holds a position of seniority that influences court procedure and culture.

== List ==
=== Chief Justices of Southern Rhodesia ===
No.	Image	Chief Justice	Tenure	Appointed by
1		Sir Murray Bisset	1927 – 24 October 1931	Sir John Chancellor
2		Sir Fraser Russell	1931–1943	Sir Cecil Hunter-Rodwell
3		Sir Robert James Hudson	1943 – 15 May 1950	Sir Evelyn Baring
—		Vernon Lewis (Acting)	1950–1950	Sir John Noble Kennedy
4		Sir Robert Clarkson Tredgold	1950–1955	Sir John Noble Kennedy
5		Sir John Murray	1 August 1955 – 1961	Sir Peveril William-Powlett
6		Sir Hugh Beadle (see below)	1961 – 11 November 1965	Sir Humphrey Gibbs

=== Chief Justices of Rhodesia ===
No.	Image	Chief Justice	Tenure	Appointed by
1		Sir Hugh Beadle (see above)	11 November 1965 – 1977	Sir Humphrey Gibbs
2		Hector Macdonald	1977 – May 1980	John Wrathall

=== Chief Justices of Zimbabwe ===
No.	Image	Chief Justice	Tenure	Appointed by
		Hector Macdonald	18 April 1980 – May 1980	
		John Vernon Radcliffe Lewis (acting)	May 1980 – 1 July 1980	Canaan Banana
1		John Fieldsend	1 July 1980 – February 1983	Canaan Banana
-		Leo Baron (acting)	1983	Canaan Banana
2		Telford Georges	February 1983 – February 1984	Canaan Banana
3		Enoch Dumbutshena	29 February 1984 – 1990	Canaan Banana
4		Anthony Gubbay	1990–2001	Robert Mugabe
5		Godfrey Chidyausiku	July 2001 – 28 February 2017	Robert Mugabe
6		Luke Malaba	27 March 2017 – 15 May 2026	Robert Mugabe
7		Elizabeth Gwaunza	15 May 2026 – present	Emmerson Mnangagwa

== See also ==
- List of justices of the Supreme Court of Zimbabwe
