= Godfrey Chidyausiku =

Zimbabwean Judge

Godfrey Guwa Chidyausiku (23 February 1947 – 3 May 2017) was a Zimbabwean judge and politician. He was involved in politics during Rhodesia's unilaterally declared independence, being a member of the Rhodesian House of Assembly.

After Zimbabwean independence in 1980, he was elected as a Zimbabwe African National Union (Patriotic Front) member to the Zimbabwean House of Assembly, and served in the government as Attorney-General. After becoming a Judge he headed the Constitutional Convention in 1999, and was appointed Chief Justice in 2001. He retired on 31 March 2017 after reaching the 70-year mandatory retirement age of Zimbabwean judges. He then died on 3 May 2017 in a South African hospital.

== Career ==
Chidyausiku was born in Domboshawa, Southern Rhodesia. He attended Mutake School at Makumbi Mission, and then St Ignatius College in Chishawasha. He won a place at the University of Rhodesia from 1968 to 1972 where he read law. He went into private legal practice. At the 1974 general election he won the Harari African Roll constituency, standing with the unofficial support of the African National Council which had been set up by ZANU, ZAPU and FROLIZI. He acted in opposition to the government of Ian Smith. Chidyausiku stood down at the 1977 election.

In the 1980 election, Chidyausiku was elected as 12th on ZANU-PF's list for Mashonaland East when ZANU-PF won 14 seats. He was Deputy Minister of Local Government and Housing and of Justice from 1980, and was promoted to be Attorney-General in 1982.

Chidyausiku was later promoted to be a judge and served as chair of the Constitutional Convention charged with drafting a new constitution for Zimbabwe. He ensured that the constitution accorded with the wishes of the government, including an executive Presidency; many members of the convention had argued against it. However, in the referendum on the constitution, held in February 2000, the electorate rejected the text.

After the resignation of Chief Justice Anthony Gubbay, Chidyausiku was named as Zimbabwe's new Chief Justice in July 2001.

== Personal life ==
Chidyausiku was married to Sheila Madzima (1948–2009).

== Death ==
Godfrey Chidyausiku died of complications from cancer in South Africa. He was survived by 3 children and two grandchildren. He was buried at the National Heroes' Acre in Harare, Zimbabwe on Saturday, 13 May 2017.
