= Luke Malaba =

Zimbabwean judge (born 1951)

Honourable Mr Justice Luke Malaba

Chief Justice of Zimbabwe
- In office Acting: 1 – 27 March 2017; 27 March 2017 – 15 May 2026
- Deputy: Elizabeth Gwaunza
- Preceded by: Godfrey Chidyausiku
- Succeeded by: Elizabeth Gwaunza

Personal details
- Born: 15 May 1951 (age 75) Plumtree, Southern Rhodesia (now Zimbabwe)
- Education: University of Warwick; University of Zimbabwe

Luke Malaba (born 15 May 1951) is a Zimbabwean judge who served as Chief Justice of Zimbabwe from March 2017 until May 2026. He was appointed Chief Justice by then-President Robert Mugabe on 27 March 2017. However, he had already been serving as acting Chief Justice since 1 March 2017, following Justice Godfrey Chidyausiku‘s retirement. Previously, he had served as Deputy Chief Justice.

== Biography ==
Luke Malaba was born in Plumtree, Southern Rhodesia on 15 May 1951. He attended St. Ignatius College in Chishawasha. He received his law degree from the University of Warwick in 1974, and another law degree from the University of Zimbabwe in 1982. From 1981 to 1984, he served as a prosecutor in Bulawayo. He started his career as a magistrate in 1984 at Masvingo. He attained the rank of regional magistrate in 1990. He was appointed as an judge of the High Court in 1994, serving until 2001. He was elevated to the Supreme Court in August 2001, and became the country’s first Deputy Chief Justice in 2008.

== Chief Justice of Zimbabwe ==
Following the retirement of Godfrey Chidyausiku, Malaba was appointed Acting Chief Justice on 1 March 2017. During interviews to become the Chief Justice, he scored 92 percent, achieving the highest score of those interviewed. He assumed the office on 27 March 2017. In July 2018, Malaba ruled that former President Robert Mugabe had freely resigned, and was not coerced. The Chief Justice, in a unanimous Supreme Court decision in August 2018, concurred with the other eight justices of the court, in a ruling that president Emmerson Mnangagwa's July 2018 election was lawfully conducted, and had "complied with prescribed procedures", dismissing the political opposition's claims to the contrary.

=== Retirement controversy ===
Under the Zimbabwean constitution, Chief Justice Malaba was required to retire when he reached 70 years of age on 15 May 2021.

However Amendment 2 to the Constitution increased the age limit to 75 in early May 2021 allowing him to remain in office. There are questions around the constitutionality of this amendment. On 15 May 2021 the High Court of Zimbabwe retired Malaba as the chief justice and ruled his extension of office was unconstitutional. This judgement was appealed in the constitutional court which overruled the high court decision.

The effort to keep him in office was likely sponsored by Zimbabwean President Emmerson Mnangagwa, as Malaba had made two significant rulings in his favour. Firstly, he had legitimised the coup that had ousted Robert Mugabe, and secondly, he had quashed a legal challenge to the outcome of the 2018 Zimbabwean general election. In the event that there are electoral challenges in the 2023 election, Mnangagwa would prefer to have a favourable judge presiding.
