= Supreme Court of Zimbabwe =

Highest court of Zimbabwe

- Interactive map of Supreme Court of Zimbabwe
- 17.8256°S 31.0523°E
- Established: 18 April 1980 (46 years ago)
- Location: Harare, Zimbabwe
- Coordinates: 17.8256°S 31.0523°E
- Composition method: Presidential appointment following Judicial Service Commission advice
- Authorised by: Constitution of Zimbabwe
- Judge term length: Until the age of 70, or extended to 75
- Number of positions: No fewer than 4
- Website: jsc.org.zw

Chief Justice of Zimbabwe
- Currently: Elizabeth Gwaunza
- Since: 15 May 2026
- Lead position ends: 15 June 2028

Deputy Chief Justice of Zimbabwe
- Currently: Paddington Garwe
- Since: 15 May 2026

The Supreme Court of Zimbabwe is the final court of appeal in Zimbabwe for all non-constitutional matters. It is a superior court of record and the highest appellate court in the judicial hierarchy, except in matters falling within the exclusive jurisdiction of the Constitutional Court.

The Supreme Court hears appeals from the High Court, Labour Court, Administrative Court and other subordinate courts or tribunals in civil and criminal cases. Its decisions are binding on all lower courts in non-constitutional matters.

== History ==
The Supreme Court traces its origins to the Appellate Division of the High Court of Southern Rhodesia. Following independence in 1980, the Lancaster House Constitution established the Supreme Court as the highest appellate body. Initially, constitutional matters were also heard by the Supreme Court.

The 2013 Constitution fundamentally restructured the judiciary by creating a separate Constitutional Court as the apex court for all constitutional matters. This left the Supreme Court as the final court of appeal exclusively for non-constitutional issues. The reform aimed to strengthen judicial specialisation, enhance the protection of fundamental rights and promote constitutional supremacy.

== Composition and membership ==
The Supreme Court consists of the Chief Justice, the Deputy Chief Justice and such number of other judges (not fewer than two) as the President may appoint from time to time. Acting judges may be appointed when required.

Judges are appointed by the President on the recommendation of the Judicial Service Commission following public interviews. Amendment No. 2 of 2021 extended the retirement age for Supreme Court judges from 70 to 75 (or an elected additional five-year term).

As of April 2026, the Chief Justice is Luke Malaba, whose extended tenure was confirmed by the Constitutional Court in 2021; he is scheduled to retire on 15 May 2026 upon reaching the extended retirement age. The court includes judges such as Justices Felicia Chatukuta, Alfas Chitakunye, George Chiweshe and others. The bench sits in panels, usually of three judges, though larger benches may be convened for significant matters.

== Jurisdiction ==
Section 169 of the Constitution provides that the Supreme Court is the final court of appeal for Zimbabwe, except in matters over which the Constitutional Court has jurisdiction. It has:

- Appellate jurisdiction over decisions of the High Court, Labour Court, Administrative Court and other courts or tribunals in civil and criminal matters.
- Review jurisdiction in appropriate cases.
- No original jurisdiction in constitutional matters (these are reserved for the Constitutional Court).

The Supreme Court may confirm, vary or set aside decisions of lower courts and may make any order that is just and equitable in the circumstances. Its judgments are authoritative interpretations of statute law, common law and customary law (where applicable).

== Justices ==
The Chief Justice is Elizabeth Gwaunza since 15 May 2026. The Chief Justice and the puisne justices, ranked in order of seniority are:

Justice	Sworn in	Appointer	Ref.
Elizabeth Gwaunza (Chief Justice)	15 May 2026	Emmerson Mnangagwa	
Paddington Garwe (Deputy Chief Justice)	15 May 2026	Emmerson Mnangagwa	
Antonia Guvava	15 July 2013	Robert Mugabe	
Chinembiri Bhunu	16 September 2015	Robert Mugabe	
Susan Mavangira	16 September 2015	Robert Mugabe	
Tendai Uchena	16 September 2015	Robert Mugabe	
Lavender Makoni	11 May 2018	Emmerson Mnangagwa	
Charles Hungwe	30 June 2019	Emmerson Mnangagwa	
Nicholas Mathonsi	30 June 2019	Emmerson Mnangagwa	
Felistus Chatukuta	3 June 2021	Emmerson Mnangagwa	
Alfas Chitakunye	3 June 2021	Emmerson Mnangagwa	
George Chiweshe	3 June 2021	Emmerson Mnangagwa	
Samuel Kudya	3 June 2021	Emmerson Mnangagwa	
Joseph Musakwa	3 June 2021	Emmerson Mnangagwa	
Hlekani Mwayera	3 June 2021	Emmerson Mnangagwa	

== Notable cases ==
=== Devagi Rattigan and Others v. Chief Immigration Officer and Others (June 1994) ===
Devagi Rattigan and Others v. Chief Immigration Officer and Others was a case centered upon whether an immigration law that refused permanent residence to alien husbands of female Zimbabwean citizens violated those particular citizens' right to the freedom of movement in Zimbabwe's Constitution. The three applicants were all female legal citizens of Zimbabwe, yet each of them was married to men who were not legal citizens of Zimbabwe. The three husbands had previously been denied permanent residence in Zimbabwe due to the fact that they did not have any skills that the country was in need of.

The reasoning of the Chief Immigration Officer was that although the marriages may have been genuine, government policy stated that the principal applicant for a permanent residence should be the husband, unless the wife was deemed a high qualified professional. Further, a residence permit could only be given to foreign males if they possess a scarce skill and met the threshold for their finances.

The applicants made the argument that the refusal of permanent residence violated the freedom of movement clause in Section 22(1) of the Zimbabwe Constitution. This clause suggests that the freedom of movement includes: "The right to move freely throughout Zimbabwe, the right to reside in any part of Zimbabwe, the right to enter and leave Zimbabwe and immunity from expulsion from Zimbabwe." The plaintiffs also argued that the law indirectly put restraints on gender, as denying their husband's permanent residence in Zimbabwe simultaneously denied a women's right to establish their residence.

The Supreme Court of Zimbabwe made a groundbreaking decision in 1995 by ruling that a foreign husband should have identical rights of residence as a foreign wife. As a direct result of this ruling, the Zimbabwean government added the 14th amendment to the constitution, which effectively got rid of all rights to citizenship based on marriage, as well as removing gender discrimination. This decision has been cited and reinforced in many cases since, including Salem v. Chief Immigration Officer and Others.

=== Veneria Magaya v. Nakayi Shonhiwa Magaya (May 1999) ===
Magaya v. Magaya is known to be one of the cases that has had the most far-reaching impacts on the rights of African women. This case centered upon an African male dying intestate, and the question of which of his immediate children might gain inheritance. Shonhiwa Magaya was survived by four children, only one of whom was female, as well as two polygamous wives. A community court initially ruled in favor of the eldest female daughter, naming her heir to the estate. Magaya's second son, Nakayi, challenged this ruling, and after another hearing, was proclaimed the heir to the estate on grounds of customary law, kicking his sister off the Harare property. The daughter, Venia, quickly appealed to the Zimbabwean Supreme Court, challenging the appointment.

Upon further appeal, the Supreme Court upheld the original decision, reasoning that under customary succession laws, males were the dominant heirs. The court also had to address whether of not this discriminatory customary law principle should be deemed unconstitutional. Section 23 of the Zimbabwean Constitution protects citizens from discrimination on grounds of "race, tribe, place of origin, political opinions, colour or creed," yet it does not make any mention of outlawing discrimination based on sex. This particular section excludes protection from these respective matters: "adoption, marriage, divorce, burial, devolution of property on death or other matters of personal law." Although the court did make a statement acknowledging the importance of gender advancement, it argued that fundamental customary laws are the cornerstone of African society and tradition, and are therefore hard to be thrown out. Further, the court made the argument that issues in this subject area should be assigned to legislators, not the courts.

Critics of this decision have said that it should be deemed invalid under both international law and Zimbabwe constitutional law. Many critics of Zimbabwean cultural practices suggest that even if the Supreme Court had taken human rights into consideration, the same decision would most likely have been reached. The law in Zimbabwe at this time so distinctly sanctions discrimination based on gender that the case was inevitably going to be decided the way it was. This case still remains important and remains in question throughout Southern Africa, as it has become a mobilization stimulus among groups who say it has violated human rights as well as Zimbabwe's Constitution.

=== Chavunduka v. Minister of Home Affairs (March 2000) ===
Chavunduka v. Minister of Home Affairs is a case that regarded the publishing of what was deemed by the defendant to be "false news." This case initially came into the public realm when the senior journalist, Raymond Choto, and editor, Mark Chavunduka, of a Zimbabwean newspaper entitled The Standard were taken into custody and arrested for after they published an article that discussed a failed coup d'etat entitled "Senior Army Officers Arrested". The general claim of this article was that the coup was caused by discontent with the government's mismanagement of the economy as well as anger over Zimbabwe's involvement in a war raging in the Democratic Republic of the Congo.

When arrested, the two journalists from The Standard were charged with publishing a "false statement likely to cause fear, alarm or despondency" under section 50(2)(a) of the Law and Order Act. After being released on bail by the Magistrates Court, the two men brought the case to the Supreme Court of Zimbabwe, claiming that their rights to the freedom of expression were being violated under section 18 of the 1980 Zimbabwean Constitution. Ultimately, the Supreme Court ruled in favor of the plaintiffs, making the assertion that publishing "false news" was too broad and vague. The court pointed out that: "Almost anything that is newsworthy is likely to cause, to some degree at least, in a section of the public or a single person, one or other of these subjective emotions." Chief Justice Anthony Gubbay delivered the majority judgement of the full bench of justices.

This case remains important because of the somewhat binding precedent it set in the realm of protecting free speech. Despite this ruling, the government of Zimbabwe would enact Section 80 of the AIPPA just two years later. The regime of Robert Mugabe passed this law which prohibited journalists from publishing false information that is said to threaten the interests of the state. Within a few months of this statue being enacted, it was used against many journalists, including Andrew Meldrum.

=== Nyamande & Another v Zuva Petroleum (2015) ===
The court upheld an employer's right to terminate employment on notice without substantive justification in certain circumstances, sparking widespread debate on labour rights and leading to legislative reforms.

=== Chigwada v Chigwada (2020) ===
The court addressed testamentary freedom versus constitutional protections for surviving spouses and family maintenance.

== See also ==
- List of justices of the Supreme Court of Zimbabwe
