= High Court of Zimbabwe =

- Interactive map of High Court of Zimbabwe
- 17.825773349754147°S 31.051374249385947°E
- Established: 1980
- Location: Harare and Bulawayo
- Coordinates: 17.825773349754147°S 31.051374249385947°E
- Composition method: Presidential nomination after consultation with the Judicial Service Commission
- Authorised by: Constitution of Zimbabwe
- Judge term length: Until the age of 70
- Number of positions: No set number
- Website: www.jsc.org.zw

Judge President
- Currently: Mary Zimba-Dube
- Since: 2021

Deputy Judge President
- Currently: Garainesu Mawadze
- Since: 2024

The High Court of Zimbabwe is a superior court of record and one of the principal courts in the judicial hierarchy of Zimbabwe. It exercises unlimited original jurisdiction in both civil and criminal matters throughout the country and serves as an important court of review and appeal from subordinate courts.

The High Court sits permanently in Harare and Bulawayo, with additional circuits in other provinces such as Mutare and Masvingo. It plays a central role in the administration of justice, including the protection of fundamental rights (subject to the exclusive jurisdiction of the Constitutional Court on certain constitutional matters).

== History ==
The origins of the High Court trace back to the High Court of Southern Rhodesia, established in 1899 under colonial administration. It functioned as both a trial and appellate court, sitting in Salisbury (now Harare) and Bulawayo. After the Unilateral Declaration of Independence in 1965, it was briefly known as the High Court of Rhodesia and later the High Court of Zimbabwe Rhodesia. Upon Zimbabwe's independence in 1980, it became the High Court of Zimbabwe.

Under the Lancaster House Constitutionof 1980, the High Court had a General Division and an Appellate Division (the latter later becoming the Supreme Court). The 2013 Constitution (Chapter 8) restructured the judiciary, establishing the Constitutional Court as the apex court for constitutional matters while retaining the High Court as a superior court with broad original jurisdiction. This reform aimed to enhance judicial independence and access to justice.

== Composition and membership ==
The High Court consists of the Judge President, the Deputy Judge President, and such number of other judges as may be appointed from time to time. The Chief Justice may also appoint acting judges from the Supreme Court or qualified persons. The court is headed by the Judge President, who oversees its administration.

Judges are appointed by the President on the recommendation of the Judicial Service Commission following public interviews. As of early 2026, recent appointments have expanded the bench to address workload. The Judge President is Justice Mary Zimba-Dube, with Justice Garainesu Mawadze serving as Deputy Judge President. The court has a significant number of judges stationed primarily in Harare and Bulawayo.

The High Court has divisions handling civil, criminal, and specialised matters, and it conducts circuit courts in various provinces to improve access to justice.

== Jurisdiction ==
Section 171 of the Constitution of Zimbabwe outlines the jurisdiction of the High Court:

- It has unlimited original jurisdiction over all civil and criminal matters throughout Zimbabwe.
- It has supervisory and review jurisdiction over magistrates' courts and other subordinate courts and tribunals.
- It may decide constitutional matters except those reserved exclusively for the Constitutional Court.
- It possesses such appellate jurisdiction as may be conferred by an Act of Parliament.
- The court has inherent powers to protect its process and ensure the administration of justice.

In criminal matters, the High Court can impose any sentence authorised by law, including the death penalty in capital cases (subject to constitutional limitations). In civil matters, it handles disputes of any value and grants a wide range of remedies, including interdicts, declaratory orders, and reviews of administrative action.

The High Court also acts as the upper guardian of minors, with special responsibility for the best interests of children.

== Notable cases ==
The High Court has delivered numerous significant judgments, particularly in the areas of human rights, land reform, electoral matters, and administrative law. Some notable examples include:

- Cases challenging aspects of the fast-track land reform programme in the early 2000s, where the court grappled with property rights and executive actions.
- High-profile criminal trials and reviews involving allegations of corruption, political violence, and human rights abuses.
- Rulings on child rights, including matters related to the age of consent and protection of minors, often aligning with or feeding into Constitutional Court decisions.
- Judicial review applications against government decisions, ministerial actions, and statutory instruments.

The court regularly handles urgent applications, reviews of magistrate court decisions, and complex commercial disputes. Its judgments are published on platforms such as ZimLII and frequently cited in superior courts.
