= Stella Madzimbamuto =

African nurse, Zimbabwean nationalist, civil rights and women's rights activist

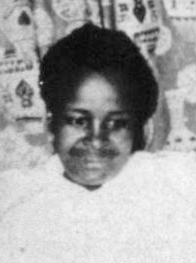
- Madzimbamuto before 1969
- Born: Stella Nkolombe; 13 April 1930; District Six, Cape Town, Union of South Africa
- Died: 30 June 2020 (aged 90); George, South Africa
- Occupations: Nurse, Zimbabwean nationalist, civil rights activist, women's rights activist
- Years active: 1948–1995
- Spouse: Daniel Madzimbamuto
- Children: 4; including Farai D.

Stella Madzimbamuto (13 April 1930 – 30 June 2020) was a South African-born Zimbabwean nurse and plaintiff in the landmark legal case of Madzimbamuto v Lardner-Burke. Born as Stella Nkolombe in District Six of Cape Town in 1930, she trained as a nurse at South Africa's first hospital to treat black Africans, earning a general nursing and a midwifery certification. After working for three years at Ladysmith Provincial Hospital, she married a Southern Rhodesian and relocated. From 1956 to 1959, she worked as a general nurse at the Harare Central Hospital. In 1959, her husband, Daniel Madzimbamuto, was detained as a political prisoner. He would remain in detention until 1974, while she financially supported the family.

From 1960, Madzimbamuto worked as the nurse in charge of Ward B6, the Spinal and Head Injuries Unit, of Harare Hospital. She was trained by the only Africa-based neurosurgeon at the time, British physician Laurence Levy. He arranged for her to study abroad at Stoke-Mandeville National Spinal Injuries Centre in Buckinghamshire and the National Hospital for Neurology and Neurosurgery in Queen Square, London, earning certifications in the treatment of neurological and spinal injuries. Upon her return to Rhodesia, in 1965, she developed a curriculum based on her studies to train junior nurses. She worked as the lead nurse in Ward B6 until 1982. That year, she became the night matron of Harare Hospital and served in this role until her retirement in 1995.

In 1965, Madzimbamuto challenged the detainment of her husband in a lawsuit, maintaining that if the government of Rhodesia, which had declared independence from Britain, was illegal, then the detention orders the government had issued were invalid. Her case was defeated in the Rhodesian courts, but she appealed to the Judicial Committee of the Privy Council, which was the highest court for many Commonwealth countries, including Rhodesia. The Judicial Committee reversed the decision of the High Court of Rhodesia. It declared the Rhodesian government to be illegal, laws and proclamations issued by it to be invalid, and ordered Madzimbamuto's husband to be released. The Rhodesian government ignored the decision, but it has become a landmark decision regarding the issue of state sovereignty.

== Early life and education ==
Stella Nkolombe was born on 13 April 1930 in District Six of Cape Town, in the Union of South Africa to Fleecy (née Gwiba) and Enoch Nkolombe, both of Xhosa ancestry. Her mother, descended from the Nyauza-Mpondo clan, was a domestic worker and her father, descended from the Gqwashu clan, worked as a deliveryman for John William Jagger's wholesaling company. Nkolombe was the sixth child of eleven siblings and grew up speaking Xhosa. Her parents chose to live in the city so that their children had access to education and would be able to be fluent in both Afrikaans and English. Nkolombe completed her compulsory nine years of education, attending St. Philips English Church School for her primary education and then Trafalgar High School for secondary school. In 1946, she left school to allow her younger siblings an opportunity for schooling.

== Career ==
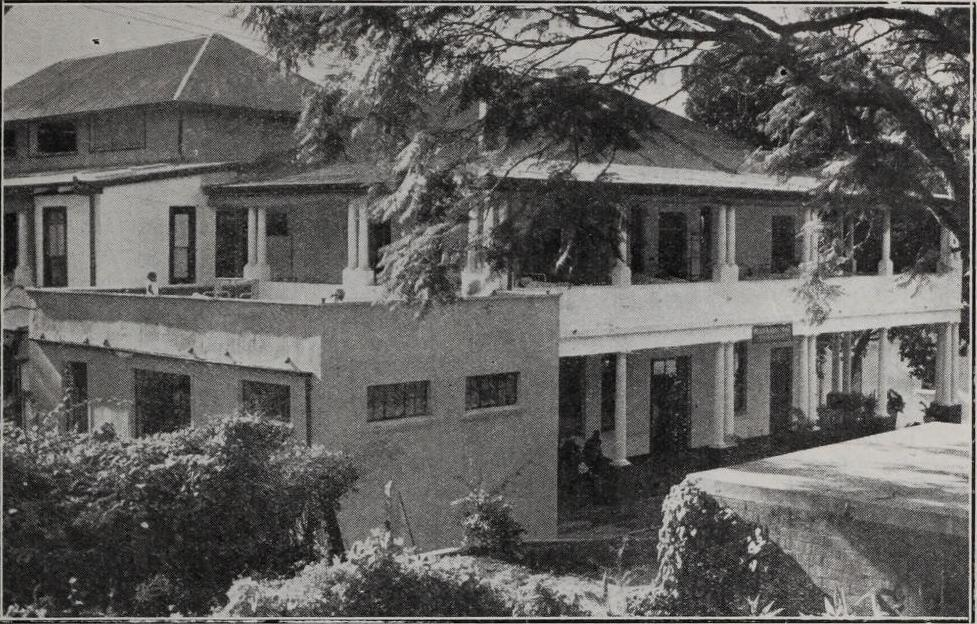
McCord Zulu Hospital

=== Early nursing career (1946–1956) ===
After leaving school in 1946, Nkolombe worked as a domestic in Sea Point, but found the job unfulfilling. A neighbour had a child who had cerebral palsy and she helped with his care. That experience led her to choose a career in nursing over teaching, which was the only other option available to her at the time. In 1948, Nkolombe moved to Durban and enrolled in general nursing courses offered by McCord Zulu Hospital, which pioneered the treatment of Africans, training of black nurses, and education for black doctors in South Africa. Three years later, upon completion of her general certification, she completed a course in midwifery, earning her certification with honours. Because of limited job choices available for blacks in Cape Town, Nkolombe returned there only to show her parents her uniform.

In 1953, after taking up a post at the Ladysmith Provincial Hospital in Ladysmith, Natal, Nkolombe debated whether to continue working or to return to school to further her education. During this time she met Daniel Madzimbamuto, who was working in Durban to create interest in the Boswell Wilkie Circus, but was originally from Southern Rhodesia. Though her parents were not keen on them marrying, in early 1956, she and Daniel married and Madzimbamuto moved to Murehwa, a small rural township near Salisbury (now Harare). (Note: Some sources indicate the marriage was in 1955, while others state 1956. Madzimbamuto noted, "We married on 17 March 1956".) As Daniel was still working in South Africa, Madzimbamuto journeyed alone by train to meet her in-laws. In July 1956, she gave birth to their oldest child, Farai, at the Harare Central Hospital, known at the time as the Gomo Hospital. When she was admitted, she encountered alumni nurses from McCord Zulu Hospital, who urged her to return to nursing because of the severe shortage at that time in Southern Rhodesia, partly because there were no facilities to train nurses. Believing it was impossible to work and care for a baby, Madzimbamuto returned to Murehwa, but the matron, Grace Houston, tracked her down and offered her a post, allowing her to bring the baby to work. Matron Houston also assisted her in obtaining housing in New Highfield, which had only outdoor toilet facilities that doubled as a cold-water shower.

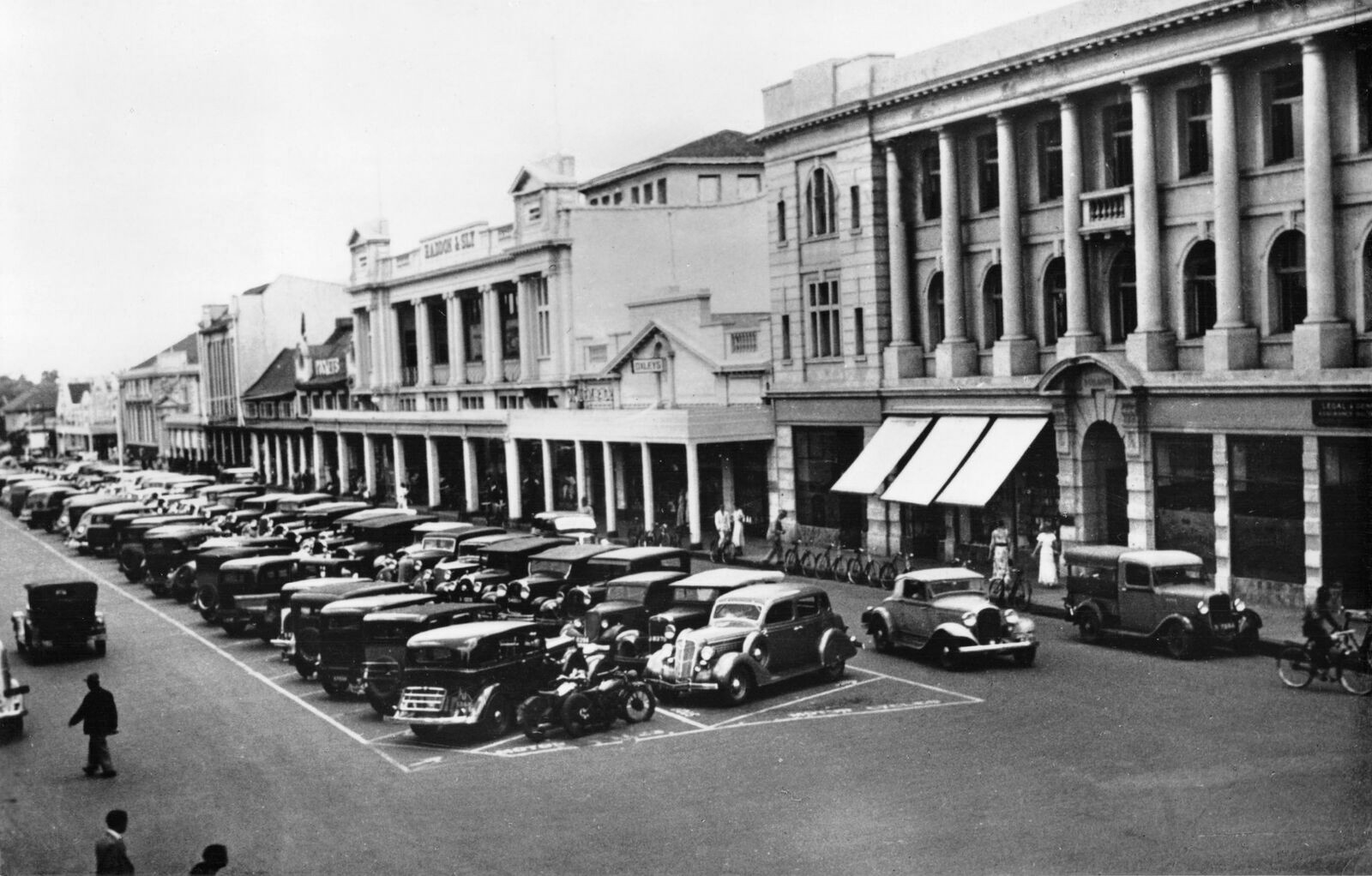
Salisbury, Rhodesia (now Harare, Zimbabwe)

When Farai was seven months old, Daniel returned to Southern Rhodesia and became involved in the Black nationalist movement. He became the chairman of the Highfield Branch of the African National Congress and his activism brought him to the attention of the Rhodesian authorities. Their second child, a daughter named Chipo, was born after Daniel's return and was six months old when he was first arrested. He was detained and confined in a detention centre from February 1959 until 8 June 1961. During the period, several times, Daniel was briefly released but after a few days returned to prison. When he was interned, Madzimbamuto had to obtain a permit to visit him. She was unsure if she and the children would be punished or deported because of his activities and was worried that her children might be taken away. Madzimbamuto considered returning to South Africa but quickly rejected the idea. Her work life was very difficult at this time, not just because of the racist attitudes of the government and some of her colleagues, but because her husband was a political prisoner: she was seen as the wife of a "gandanga", meaning terrorist.

=== Neurosurgical nurse (1960–1982) ===
In 1960, Madzimbamuto replaced a British nurse who was serving as a neurosurgical nurse to the British neurosurgeon Laurence Levy, who was the only specialist in that field serving in Africa at that time. Levy trained Madzimbamuto, teaching her how to perform basic neurosurgical nursing duties and perform procedures, such as spinal taps, air encephalograms, and myelograms, which at the time were only done by doctors. She became proficient at the techniques and trained junior doctors being educated at the hospital in how to perform them. She wanted to pass on her skills to help other women and longed for women to earn the recognition due to them; at the time, women were legal minors and typically had to stop working after marriage. (Note: After Zimbabwe gained its independence, the Legal Age of Majority Act was passed in 1982, providing that without regard to sex or race, all Zimbabweans became legal adults under civil and customary law at eighteen years old. In 1999, the Supreme Court of Zimbabwe ruled in Veneria Magaya v. Nakayi Shonhiwa Magaya in a controversial decision that the Legal Age of Majority Act did not remove the subordinate status of African women under customary law, as it did not confer rights upon them.) Upon his release from prison in 1961, Daniel was sent to the Sikombela Restriction Camp in Mapfungautsi near Gokwe Centre, where he remained until 15 January 1963. When he was released, and despite the fact that Madzimbamuto was expecting her third child, Levy encouraged her to continue her education abroad. Levy arranged for her to study abroad for two years at the Stoke-Mandeville National Spinal Injuries Centre in Buckinghamshire and the National Hospital for Neurology and Neurosurgery in Queen Square, London. Madzimbamuto decided she could only be abroad for a year. Leaving Farai and Chipo with her in-laws in Murehwa and four-month-old Tambudzai in Kenya where her mother and a sister were living, Madzimbamuto went to England in February 1964.

Daniel was rearrested on 28 April 1964 and sent to the Gonakudzingwa restriction camp and on 13 August was restricted to the Sengwe Tribal Trust Lands until 13 April 1965, when he was released. That month, Madzimbamuto left England and spent three weeks in Kenya before returning with her daughter to Southern Rhodesia. From 1965, she was in charge of Ward B6, the Spinal and Head Injuries Unit, for the next seventeen years. Madzimbamuto developed a programme to train junior nurses at Harare Hospital, teaching them what she had learned about neurological and spinal injuries. On 19 June 1965, Daniel was rearrested and sent to the Wha Wha detention centre, but was transferred from there back to Gonakudzingwa briefly before being confined in Gwelo Prison on 6 November. Madzimbamuto's passport was taken by the authorities when Daniel was arrested and she was offered it back if the entire family would leave the country, an offer she refused. The family's fourth child, a son, Tafirenyika, was born in 1966.

Madzimbamuto mostly raised her children alone because of Daniel's detainments. By 1973, she was earning Rh$327 (£130) (Note: In 1970, Rhodesia introduced a new currency and changed from the Rhodesian pound to the Rhodesian dollar. In August of that year, the new currency was pegged to the South African Rand.) per month and paying for Daniel's university studies and books as well as his clothing and toiletries, travel expenses of Rh$13.60 (£25) per month to visit him, and she and her children's monthly expenses. (Note: To put her wage in perspective, according to 1972 voting rolls, the largest group of Africans working in the formal labour market earned between Rh$70 and Rh$89 per month at that time, which would have been equivalent to approximately £38 to £48. In 1974, African women made up only about 13.6 per cent of the total African formal labour force. Up until 1980, only about 17 per cent of Zimbabwean women worked in the formal labour market. In 1974, 16.4 per cent of African women were domestic servants, 3.4 per cent were teachers, and only a small fraction were nurses. Because of discriminatory pay scales, a teacher with a university degree typically earned approximately Rh$340 per month if a white man, Rh$327 per month if a white woman, Rh$313 per month if an African male, and Rh$250 per month if an African woman. Approximately 52 per cent of the earnings for people living in Salisbury were spent monthly on food because of inflation, drought, and the conflict for independence. Another 15 per cent on average of wages went to monthly rent, 30 per cent toward clothing, heating, and toiletry items, and one per cent or less toward children's educational needs.) The racist policies of the government prevented her children from further education after they finished primary school, but friends such as Guy Clutton-Brock, Didymus Mutasa, and Terence Ranger helped with making arrangements for the children to study abroad. By that time, Farai was studying in Britain, and Chipo was being educated in Botswana. In 1973, Madzimbamuto had to obtain a temporary British passport in order to attend the International Congress of the World Federation of Neurosurgical Nurses, which was held in Tokyo. She returned home and again added the information she had learned to her training curricula for nurses.

=== Madzimbamuto v Lardner-Burke (1965–1968) ===
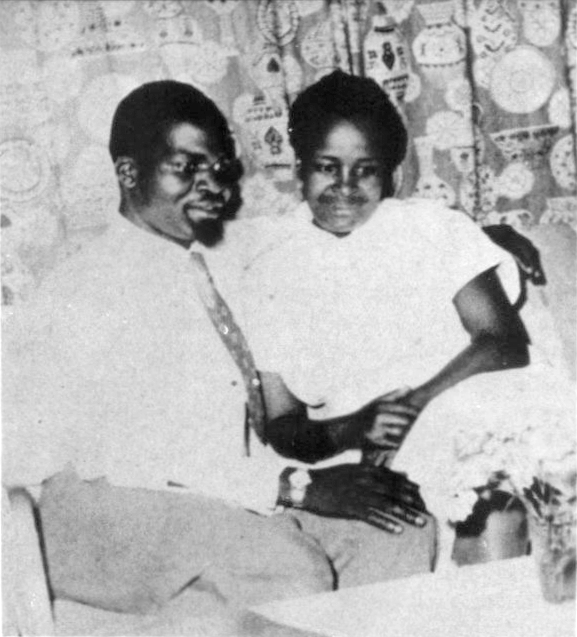
Daniel and Stella Madzimbamuto before 1969

In April 1964, Ian Smith became Prime Minister of Rhodesia, promising to maintain the policy of white rule. Under English common law detention without trial was unlawful and under the 1961 Rhodesian Constitution detention was only permitted if a state of emergency had been legally declared. Under the 1961 Constitution and the Emergency Powers Act 1960, a state of emergency could only remain in force for three months before requiring renewal. An Emergency Maintenance of Law and Order Regulation was issued on 5 November 1965, and expired on 4 February 1966. On 11 November 1965, the government issued a Unilateral Declaration of Independence without agreement by Britain to state succession. Five days later, the British Parliament passed legislation declaring the Rhodesian government to be illegal and invalidating any legislation it passed. When Smith's government passed legislation to extend the detention order, Madzimbamuto filed a lawsuit, Madzimbamuto v Lardner-Burke, to challenge her husband's detention. The basis of her suit was that if the government and its laws were illegal, the detention order under which Daniel was detained was invalid. She and Leo Baron, a lawyer, who was a political detainee like Daniel, filed parallel suits.

The General Division of the Rhodesian High Court dismissed the case in 1966, although the justices, Bennie Goldin and J. V. R. Lewis, acknowledged that the government and 1965 constitution were invalid, they noted that the courts and the oaths taken by the justices were under the 1961 valid constitution. As the Smith government was the only existing government in the country, Goldin and Lewis did not invalidate the Emergency Orders or release Daniel and Baron. However, after the hearing, Baron was released and left Rhodesia. The case was sent to the Appellate Division of the Rhodesian High Court, which ruled in January 1968. In a four (Hugh Beadle, Eric Jarvis, Hector Macdonald, and Vincent Quénet) to one (John Fieldsend) decision the government was found to be the legal authority, and while not legally recognised, its operation and legislation were considered to be legal. Though they overturned the 1965 Emergency Order, and admitted that the 1965 regulation was defective, a new Emergency Order had been put in place in 1966 to replace the prior regulation.

In May 1968, since Daniel continued to be imprisoned, Madzimbamuto applied for leave to appeal from the Rhodesian courts to the Judicial Committee of the Privy Council in Britain, which was the highest court for many Commonwealth countries, including Rhodesia. The Judicial Committee granted leave to hear the appeal. After an extensive hearing, it held that the government and all legislation passed in Rhodesia by the government were invalid, including the order to hold Daniel. An Order in Council was issued following the decree, ordering Daniel's release. The Southern Rhodesian justice minister Desmond Lardner-Burke announced on 3 August that Daniel would not be freed and that as the 1965 Constitution negated appeals to the Privy Council, the ruling by the council had no effect in Rhodesia. Daniel was not released until 24 December 1974. While imprisoned he earned a law degree, which Madzimbamuto financed. By the time he gained his freedom, Daniel was involved in another relationship. He moved to Zambia to take part in the independence movement and worked as the external affairs secretariat and on legal affairs for the Zimbabwe African People's Union's Central Committee. Madzimbamuto refused to be part of a polygamous relationship and she and Daniel became estranged. She obtained a legal separation from Daniel in 1981. In 1979, Southern Rhodesia moved toward lawful independence through negotiations carried out in London at the Lancaster House Conference. The country drafted an inclusive constitution for independence as Zimbabwe on 18 April 1980.

=== Later life (1982–2017) ===
In 1982, Madzimbamuto earned a diploma in Nursing Administration and became the night matron at Harare Central Hospital. She served for thirteen years as the night matron and then retired in 1995. As she aged, Madzimbamuto began to have health problems, including osteoporosis and failing vision. Daniel died in 1999; that same year, six months after his death, their daughter Tambudzai died. Upon his death, Daniel was declared a national hero and buried in the National Heroes' Acre in Harare. To preserve his memory and allow study of people involved in the African nationalist movement, Madzimbamuto donated Daniel's papers in the National Archives of Zimbabwe. In 2003, she returned to South Africa to live with her son, Tafirenyika. Madzimbamuto published her memoir My Struggle, My Life in 2017. Her last years were spent in George, South Africa, where she lived with Tambudzai's daughter Shamiso.

== Death and legacy ==
Madzimbamuto died on 30 June 2020 in George, South Africa. All of her children became professionals. Farai became a physician and professor. In 2014, he challenged his right to hold dual nationality and won a case in the Constitutional Court of Zimbabwe. The court ruled that the 2013 constitution allows Zimbabweans by birth to hold dual nationality, and that the immigration department could neither abridge his unconditional right to live in Zimbabwe or require permits that restricted his free movement. Chipo became an executive secretary after earning British certificates in secretarial studies and public relations and later went into banking. Tambudzai earned her teaching degree in Zimbabwe and later became a speech therapist after completing her education in England. Tafirenyika completed his studies in chemical engineering in Russia.

Her case, Madzimbamuto v Lardner-Burke, is often cited as a landmark decision and has become an international precedent, cited in cases regarding state and territorial conflict and sovereignty issues. Most of the wives of the nationalist detainees were unable to give more than comfort, loyalty, and emotional support to their husbands. Madzimbamuto is remembered for her unique stand to defy the Rhodesian government and challenge its legality. Richard Mahomva, a political scientist, and other writers have noted that Madzimbamuto is also remembered as a forerunner to the development of a women's rights movement in the country.
