= Zimbabwean passport =

Passport of the Republic of Zimbabwe issued to Zimbabwean citizens

- The front cover of a contemporary Zimbabwean biometric passport.
- Type: Passport
- Issued by: Zimbabwe
- First issued: April 1980 (following independence)
- Purpose: Identification and traveling internationally
- Valid in: All countries
- Eligibility: Zimbabwean citizenship
- Expiration: Adult: 10 years Child: 5 years
- Cost: Ordinary: US$150 Emergency or express: US$250

The Zimbabwean passport is a travel document issued to citizens of Zimbabwe. It mainly serves to grant its bearer international passage and serves as proof of citizenship. It can also be used for identification in lieu of national registration card or drivers licence.

On 15 December 2021, the Zimbabwean government launched the new e-passport in order to meet modern international standards.

== Country code mismatch ==
The country code in some Zimbabwean passports were not printed in accordance with the ISO 3166-1 alpha-3 code for Zimbabwe. The country code in these passports is erroneously printed ZIM when it should be ZWE; this has led to frustrating encounters for Zimbabweans with airline, immigration, and border control officials. This error has often led to officials suspecting such passports to be fake. When the passport's MRZ is scanned, the immigration and checking systems fail to recognise the invalid country code ZIM. Airlines have issued circulars to their staff and published information on their websites highlighting this issue.

== Visa requirements ==
As of 1 January 2017, Zimbabwean citizens had visa-free or visa on arrival access to 59 countries and territories, ranking the Zimbabwean passport 77th in terms of travel freedom (tied Ghanaian passport) according to the Henley visa restrictions index.

== See also ==
- Rhodesian passport (used before 1980)
- Visa requirements for Zimbabwean citizens
- Visa policy of Zimbabwe
