= Daniel Madzimbamuto =

Southern Rhodesian activist

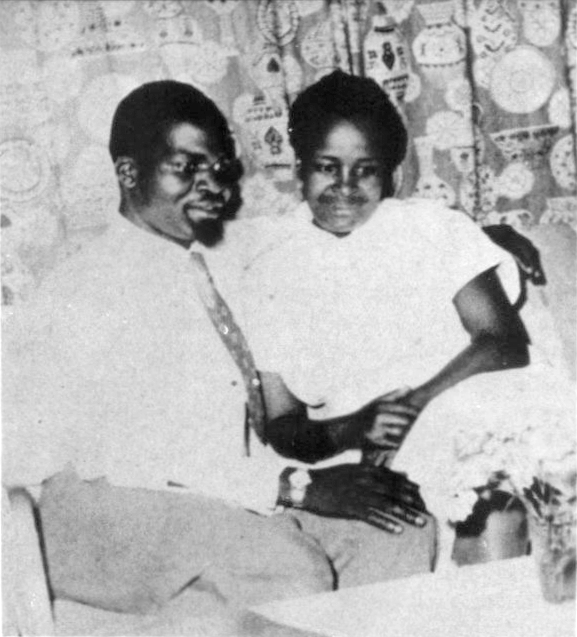
Daniel and Stella Madzimbamuto before 1969

Daniel Nyamayaro Madzimbamuto (1929–1999) was a Southern Rhodesian activist who became a Zimbabwean politician and administrator.

== Early life ==
Daniel Nyamayaro Madzimbamuto was born in Murehwa, on October 8, either 1929 or 1930. This was a rural area north of Salisbury, Southern Rhodesia (now Harare, Zimbabwe). He was the son of a Tribal Trust Land farmer, and the eighth child of a family of 10.

He was schooled at the Murehwa Mission until 1948, when he won a scholarship to the Munali Secondary School, in Northern Rhodesia (now Zambia), where he studied until 1952. After graduation he worked as a broadcaster, publicist, and salesman throughout Rhodesia and South Africa.

== Marriage ==
He met Stella Nkolombe, who would become his wife, in Durban, which he was visiting as a publicity officer for Boswell Wilkie Circus. She was a nurse at Ladysmith Provincial Hospital. They quickly married and moved to Rhodesia. She gave birth to the first of their four children, son Farai (Shona language for "Be happy"), in 1956.

== Politics and detentions ==
Upon returning to Rhodesia, Madzimbamuto became active in nationalist politics. First he joined the recently founded City Youth League. When it merged with the African National Congress in 1957, he became chair of the ANC's Highfield branch. He was first detained in 1959 and though occasionally released for short periods, was not fully released until 1963. Then he was soon re-arrested as a member of the Zimbabwe African People's Union Central Committee. Stella Madzimbamuto challenged his continued detention in the landmark legal case Madzimbamuto v Lardner-Burke on the grounds that Rhodesia's Unilateral Declaration of Independence in 1965 was invalid. She lost in Rhodesian court, and though she won in the Judicial Committee of the Privy Council in 1968, Madzimbamuto was not released until 1974. They had other children during this period, whose names reflect their parents' growing desperation: Chipo ("Gift"), Tambudzai ("They are troubling us") and Tafirenyika ("We are dying for the country"). During imprisonment, Madzimbamuto earned a law degree via correspondence from the University of London. In 1969, he was declared Amnesty International Prisoner of the Year.

When Madzimbamuto was released in 1974, he had another romantic relationship, and he and Stella became separated. He went to Lusaka, Zambia, to participate in the Zimbabwe War of Liberation with the ZAPU and ANC. In 1976 he served as the foreign secretary of the Joshua Nkomo branch of the ANC during a meeting in Cairo. He married Violet Lana Chungu Tawana during this period, giving birth to the first of three children, girl Sarah named after his grandmother, in 1978.

== Post independence ==
After Zimbabwe's independence in 1979–80, Madzimbamuto became Deputy Postmaster General at the Zimbabwe Posts and Telecommunications Corporation. He held this post until retirement in 1998.

He died May 2, 1999, and was buried in National Heroes' Acre as the 44th National Hero.
