= Lawrence Levy =

Lawrence Levy may refer to:

- Lawrence H. Levy, American television writer and producer
- Lawrence C. Levy, journalist and professor

== See also ==
- Laurence Levy (1921–2007), neurosurgeon
