= Zimbabwean nationality law =

Citizenship of Zimbabwe Act

National Assembly of Zimbabwe
- Enacted by: Government of Zimbabwe
- Status: Current legislation

Zimbabwean nationality law is regulated by the Constitution of Zimbabwe, as amended; the Citizenship of Zimbabwe Act, and its revisions; and various international agreements to which the country is a signatory. These laws determine who is, or is eligible to be, a Zimbabwean national.

The legal means to acquire nationality (formal legal membership in a nation) differ from the domestic relationship of rights and obligations between a national and the nation, known as citizenship. Nationality describes the relationship of an individual to the state under international law, whereas citizenship is the domestic relationship of an individual within the nation. Commonwealth countries often use the terms nationality and citizenship as synonyms, despite their legal distinction and the fact that they are regulated by different governmental administrative bodies.

Zimbabwean nationality is typically obtained under the principal of jus sanguinis, i.e. by birth to parents with Zimbabwean nationality. It can be granted to persons with an affiliation to the country, or to a permanent resident who has lived in the country for a given period of time through registration, a process known elsewhere as naturalisation.

== Acquiring Zimbabwean nationality ==
Nationality can be obtained in Zimbabwe at birth or later in life through registration. (Note: Bronwen Manby, an expert on African nationality laws, has stated that the provisions to acquire nationality in the 2013 Constitution conflict with the 1984 Citizenship Act, as amended in 2003. For example the 2013 Constitution quotes provisions from the 1980 requirements to acquire nationality and do not reflect amendments made through 2003.)

=== By birth ===
Typically, in Zimbabwe, provisions to acquire nationality through jus soli, i.e. by birth in the territory, are only relevant for foundlings and for the stipulations regarding dual nationality. Those who are eligible for nationality by birth include:

- Persons born in the country who have at least one parent or grandparent who was a Zimbabwean national by birth or descent;
- Persons born abroad who have at least one parent or grandparent who was a Zimbabwean national by birth, descent, or registration and whose birth is registered in Zimbabwe; or
- Foundlings or orphans under the age of fifteen whose parents are unknown.

=== By registration ===
Registration can be granted to persons who have resided in Zimbabwe for a sufficient period of time to confirm they understand the customs and traditions of the country. General qualifications are that applicants are of majority and legal capacity, have good character, and can verify legal residency of a minimum of ten years. Besides foreigners meeting the criteria, those who can register include:

- Adoptees may acquire Zimbabwean nationality by registration, upon completion of the legal adoption process;
- The spouse of a Zimbabwean national may register as Zimbabwean after a five-year residency; or
- Minor children may acquire nationality by inclusion on a parent's registration application.

== Loss of nationality ==
Zimbabweans are allowed to renounce their nationality, provided that they receive permission from the ministry responsible for nationality provisions. The government may oppose during times of war or if there is a conflict with public policy. Overall, under the constitution, the government cannot deprive anyone of nationality if they would become stateless. (Note: The 2013 constitution conflicts with the nationality law on statelessness as well, according to Manby, who notes that the constitution forbids denaturalisation if the person would become stateless, but the 1984 Citizenship Act gives the minister authority to revoke nationality, even though the person would become stateless, if he decides a naturalised person should not continue to be a citizen to protect public welfare.) Nationals by birth can be deprived of their nationality if it was fraudulently obtained or if, in the case of a foundling, if it is later learned the child had other nationality. (Note: The 1984 Citizenship Act contains no provisions to deprive a national by birth of their nationality, but the 2013 constitution allows it in these two instances.) Registered persons can be denaturalised for any type of support of an enemy nation with whom Zimbabwe is at war; for committing serious crimes that carry a sentence of one year or more; disloyal acts or crimes against the state or state security; for residing outside of the country for more than five years; or for committing fraud, misrepresentation, or concealment in a naturalisation or registration application. Persons who were Zimbabwean and previously lost their nationality may apply for repatriation, if they lost their nationality because of birth to a Southern Africa Development Community parent who is resident in Zimbabwe, of having dual nationality, or for having been absent from the country for more than five years.

== Dual nationality ==
Under the terms of the 2013 Constitution, Zimbabweans by birth are allowed to hold dual nationality, but those who have nationality by descent or registration may be denied the ability to have other nationality. (Note: Manby has noted other discrepancies between the 2013 Constitution and the 1984 Citizenship Act, noting that the constitution allows dual nationality for Zimbabweans by birth, and makes a provision only for the parliament to draft legislation regarding dual nationality for those who acquire nationality by descent or registration. But, the Citizenship Act forbids any adult from holding more than one nationality, unless they acquired another nationality automatically upon marriage. Manby also states that the provision for children who have dual nationality from birth to choose one nationality prior to their nineteenth birthday is unconstitutional given the 2013 language on dual nationality being allowed for Zimbabweans by birth.)

== History ==
Anthropologists have dated remains in the area 100,000 years ago and attributed those inhabitants to be ancestors of Khoekhoe people who reside in the territory today. Waves of Bantu-speakers migrated into the area from 200 BC to 500 AD, pushing the Khoekhoe northward. Many of the Bantu groups were Shona people, who by the tenth century were the most populous group in the area. The Shona developed centralised states which engaged in trade with Arab people from Mozambique. The political center of their state, the Kingdom of Zimbabwe, was founded at Great Zimbabwe in the 11th century. It flourished between 1250 and 1550 before being abandoned. The collapse of the Zimbabwe Kingdom gave rise to the Torwa dynasty of the Kingdom of Butua in the southwestern region of present-day Zimbabwe and about the same time in the north around the Zambezi Valley, the founding the Kingdom of Mutapa. In addition to these centralised kingdoms, the majority of inhabitants of Southern Africa lived in small societies of kinship networks, which included Nguni and Sotho people in the east and Tswana people in the west, while the Shona lived throughout the territory. The Mutapa Kingdom became the dominant political force in the northern part of the territory, developing extensive trade networks with the coastal Muslim peoples. As Portuguese rivals began to replace the Muslim traders, European contact with the Mutapa emerged.

The Portuguese explorer António Fernandes first visited the territory of the Manyika people around 1511 in search of finding the source of gold traded with Sofala. In a 1513 journey, Fernandes traveled throughout the northeastern portion of Zimbabwe encountering the Mutapa Kingdom. The Portuguese established trading posts in the Zimbabwean Highveld, but often were in conflict with both the indigenous people and their Muslim trading rivals. By the seventeenth century, Portuguese attacks on the Mutapa Kingdom had weakened the state, causing some of their tributary states to gain autonomy. The weakened Mutapa state was attacked by the Rozvi Empire in the latter half of the century and forced into vassalage. Simultaneously, the Rozvi drove the Portuguese from the area and gained dominance in the southwestern central plateau. Beginning around the 1820s, the Mfecane brought widespread disruption and conflict, as people migrated into the area from the south. Nguni groups, like the Ndebele people and Gaza people, moved into Shona territory. The Ndebele raided the Manyika people and Mashonaland, eventually establishing the Ndebele Kingdom in Matabeleland, while the Gaza people established themselves on the Sabi River. Though they did not conquer the territory, they destroyed the Rozvi kingdom, and kept the Shona people from reorganising their states.

In 1854, British missionary Robert Moffat was accompanied by the traders Samuel H. Edwards and James Chapman into the area. The following year, Moffat's son-in-law David Livingstone visited and named Victoria Falls. Increased missionary activity led to traders and settlers moving into the region in the 1880s and 1890s. In 1884, British mining magnate Cecil Rhodes convinced Parliament to grant him a charter for the British South Africa Company to develop the region and protect it from expansion of the Portuguese. In 1888, Rhodes secured a mining concession from Lobengula, king of the Ndebele, which was recognized by Britain on 12 September 1890. That year, the company sent agents to occupy Mashonaland and established a headquarters at Fort Salisbury.

=== British South Africa Company rule (1891–1923) ===
Under the charter, and terms of the Order in Council issued 9 May 1891, Britain acquired extraterritorial jurisdiction over British subjects, in the territories operated by the British South Africa Company. From their headquarters, the Company expanded westward, and took over Matabeleland after defeating the Ndebele there in 1893. In 1895, the large territory the company was operating in Southern Africa was named Rhodesia with the dividing line between Northern Rhodesia and Southern Rhodesia being the Zambezi River. By 1896, the subjects of the declining Ndebele Kingdom revolted and were joined by the Shona people residing in the northeastern and central regions of Southern Rhodesia. The Company suppressed the uprisings in 1897 and made reforms to their administration of the area. In 1923, the British South Africa Company relinquished responsibility for Southern Rhodesia to Britain.

In Britain, allegiance, in which subjects pledged to support a monarch, was the precursor to the modern concept of nationality. The crown recognized from 1350 that all persons born within the territories of the British Empire were subjects. Those born outside the realm — except children of those serving in an official post abroad, children of the monarch, and children born on a British ship — were considered by common law to be foreigners. Marriage did not affect the status of a subject of the realm, but under common law, single women, including divorcées, were not allowed to be parents thus their children could not derive nationality maternally and were stateless unless legitimated by their father. British Nationality Acts did not extend beyond the bounds of the United Kingdom of Great Britain and Ireland, meaning that under Britain's rules of conquest, laws in place at the time of acquisition remained in place until changed. Other than common law, there was no standard statutory law which applied for subjects throughout the realm, meaning different jurisdictions created their own legislation for local conditions, which often conflicted with the laws in other jurisdictions in the empire. Thus, a person who was naturalised in Canada, for example, would be considered a foreigner, rather than a British national, in Australia or South Africa. When British protectorates were established in 1815, there was little difference between the rights of British subjects and protected persons.

In 1911, at the Imperial Conference a decision was made to draft a common nationality code for use across the empire. The British Nationality and Status of Aliens Act 1914 allowed local jurisdictions in the British self-governing territories to continue regulating nationality in their jurisdictions, but also established an imperial nationality scheme for use throughout the realm. Under its terms, common law provisions were reiterated for natural-born persons born within the realm on or after the effective date. By using the word person, the statute nullified legitimacy requirements for jus soli nationals, meaning an illegitimate child could derive nationality from its mother. For those born abroad on or after the effective date, legitimacy was still required, and nationality could only be derived by a child from a British father (one generation), who was natural-born or naturalised. It also provided that a married woman derived her nationality from her spouse, meaning if he was British, she was also, and if he was foreign, so was she. It stipulated that upon loss of nationality of a husband, a wife could declare that she wished to remain British. It allowed that if a marriage had terminated, through death or divorce, a British-born national who had lost her status through marriage could reacquire British nationality through naturalisation without meeting a residency requirement. The statute specified that a five-year residency or service to the crown was required for naturalisation.

=== British crown colony (1923–1949) ===
On 12 September 1923 Southern Rhodesia became a crown colony. Though not granted in fact Dominion status, the country was allowed broad powers to govern, but Britain retained the right to supervise affairs and the local legislature was forbidden to regulate on matters dealing with the indigenous population. (Note: Although Britain adopted a position of non-interference in the internal governance of Southern Rhodesia, under Article 73 of the UN Charter, Britain, as the administrative authority over Rhodesia had legal obligations to oversee the internal and external operations of the country. As Rhodesia's constitutions of 1923, 1953 (under the Federation), and 1961 were all authorized by Acts of the British Parliament, Britain's responsibility for oversight of the colony was recognized by the legislative action.) Amendments to the British Nationality Act were enacted in 1918, 1922, 1933 and 1943 changing derivative nationality by descent and modifying slightly provisions for women to lose their nationality upon marriage. Because of a rise in statelessness, a woman who did not automatically acquire her husband's nationality upon marriage or upon his naturalisation in another country, did not lose their British status after 1933. The 1943 revision allowed a child born abroad at any time to be a British national by descent if the Secretary of State agreed to register the birth. Under the terms of the British Nationality Act 1948 British nationals in Southern Rhodesia were reclassified at that time as "British subjects without citizenship", pending passage of a regulation by the Southern Rhodesian legislature. Provisions were made in the 1948 British Act that each Commonwealth Country could regulate their own domestic citizenship laws, which would provide that persons defined as citizens anywhere within the Commonwealth were automatically British subjects and not aliens. The basic British nationality scheme did not change overmuch, and typically those who were previously defined as British remained the same. Changes included that wives and children no longer automatically acquired the status of the husband or father, children who acquired nationality by descent no longer were required to make a retention declaration, and registrations for children born abroad were extended.

=== Internally self-governing colony (1949–1953) ===
Though not empowered under the Statute of Westminster 1931 as an equal self-governing independent state within the British realm, in 1949, the Southern Rhodesian Citizenship and British Nationality Act was passed by the Legislative Assembly of Southern Rhodesia. Under its terms, British nationality was conferred on anyone born in Southern Rhodesia between 12 September 1890 and 31 December 1949. Persons born on or after 1 January 1950, acquired the status of British subject if their father was a British subject by birth or naturalisation. Women married to British subjects automatically acquired the status of British subjects as did women who had previously been British subjects but lost their status because of marriage to a foreigner. Qualified foreigners could naturalise after a five-year residency and persons who were British subjects by virtue of Commonwealth Citizenship or Irish citizenship could register after a two-year residency in Southern Rhodesia, unless they were naturalised citizens, in which case a three-year residency was required. Foreign wives and children of Southern Rhodesians were allowed to apply for registration as British subjects. (Note: Clive Parry, a British professor who specialised in international and nationality law, noted that while naturalisation was a discretionary process in Britain, in Southern Rhodesia it was a judicial process, meaning that if one met the requirements they "had an absolute right to naturali[s]ation.") Persons who did not acquire Southern Rhodesian citizenship in conjunction with British nationality under the terms of the 1949 Act, remained British subjects without citizenship.

The 1951 Amendment (Act 49), besides making procedural changes, provided that children of enemy alien fathers or mothers confined to a camp because of marriage to an enemy alien, or born to parents in polygamous marriages were not entitled to be Southern Rhodesian citizens (nor British subjects). It also disallowed a wife or minor children to register based upon having a South Rhodesian husband or father, if they were a party to or product of a polygamous marriage. A subsequent amendment passed as Act 63 of 1953, which made minor changes to acquisition by birth and descent. That year, Southern Rhodesia was formally linked to the British protectorates of Nyasaland and Northern Rhodesia in the Federation of Rhodesia and Nyasaland. The Federation was administrative and each member retained its status as either a protectorate or colony, meaning that internal affairs could be regulated by the federation, but foreign affairs were under Britain's control. Each of the three territories maintained separate nationality rules until 1957, when the Citizenship of Rhodesia and Nyasaland and British Nationality Act was passed.

=== Federation (1958–1964) ===
Under the terms of the Citizenship of Rhodesia and Nyasaland and British Nationality Act 1957, persons born within the territories of the federation, before and after it was created, were considered to be British subjects with citizenship in the federation, if they had previously been British subjects, as long as their father was not granted diplomatic immunity or was not an enemy alien. It excluded children from acquiring citizenship or nationality if they were illegitimate. Persons born outside of the federated territories were also considered British nationals if their father had been born in one of the territories. Wives of those who became British nationals of the federation, or would have become so except for the death of their spouse, who did not gain nationality by other provisions, were allowed to register, as long as they were not a party to a polygamous relationship. Those who were British protected persons had no change in status under the statute, which reclassified as British nationals of the federation only those persons whose fathers were British subjects.

In 1962, the United Nations General Assembly affirmed that under Chapter XI of the Charter of the United Nations the status of Southern Rhodesia was as a non-self-governing territory. A special committee was assigned to evaluate the status of Southern Rhodesia between 1962 and 1964 and concluded that Rhodesia was not ready for independence and self-government because of discriminatory restrictions on the franchise, which would limit the ability of the population to exercise their right to self-determination. The Federation of Rhodesia and Nyasaland dissolved on 1 January 1964. Those who had been British nationals of the federation were reclassified as CUKCs, unless they became on that date British nationals of Southern Rhodesia. Nyasaland and Northern Rhodesia returned to the status of protectorates and BPPs therein retained their status as protected persons. Effectively, on that date, the Citizenship of Southern Rhodesia and British Nationality Act 1963 came into force. It specified that anyone who previously was a citizen of Southern Rhodesia and a national of Britain under prior legislation continued to be so. It further provided that after 1 January 1964, persons could obtain the status of British subject and citizen of Southern Rhodesia by birth, descent, registration, or naturalisation under the same standards as previously acquired. On 24 October 1964, Northern Rhodesia gained independence and thereafter, Southern Rhodesia was known simply as Rhodesia.

=== Return to self-governing colony (1965–1979) ===
On 11 November 1965, Rhodesia claimed independence, but the United Nations General Assembly condemned the action on the same day because it was an illegal seizing of authority of a small, white, settler, minority over the majority-African population, and a threat to international security and world peace. (Note: Under the terms of the constitution only six per cent of the population were able to participate in governance because of income and asset qualifications for the franchise. As the Land Apportionment Act of 1942, stipulated that fifty percent of the land in the territory was set aside for white people, the combined discriminatory legislation limited participation of the majority.) To enforce their action the UN Security Council urged enforcement of an oil embargo and economic sanctions against Southern Rhodesia. The Rhodesian Legislature passed a new constitution and attempted to ratify it. Under the 1965 Constitution, enacted by the Rhodesian legislature, British authority over the country was terminated, meaning that it declared that the governor was no longer the head of state and that the British Parliament had no oversight of internal or external affairs. The new Rhodesian Constitution was not confirmed by the British Parliament and was legally invalid. On 16 November 1965, the British Parliament passed the Southern Rhodesia Act reaffirming British sovereignty over Rhodesia and the 1961 Constitution as the valid constitutional instrument. An Order in Council (No. 1952) was issued by the British government declaring the 1965 Constitution invalid and forbidding the Rhodesian Legislature from further activity. This was followed by Order 1969 of 1965, which returned the nationality provisions to those in accord with British statutes, in effect the British Nationality Act 1948, as extended under the act of 1958, whose requirements remained basically unchanged until 1983, basing acquisition on descent, naturalisation, or registration. (Note: The Rhodesian legislature passed a citizenship law in 1967 and a subsequent statute in 1970, which was amended in 1972. These laws severely restricted the transmission of internal citizenship in the territory. To allow for those who become Rhodesian under these statutes to remain citizens at independence and thus acquire Zimbabwean nationality, the 1979 Independence Constitution recognised these previous laws.)

Two lawsuits, Madzimbamuto v Lardner-Burke and Baron v Ayre, Bezuidenhout, Dupont and Lardner-Burke also challenged the legitimacy of the constitution and declaration of independence. (Note: Both cases had to do with the restriction of movement of native Rhodesians under the Emergency Maintenance of Law and Order Regulations issued by the Rhodesian government in 1965, after a state of emergency was declared by the acting governor, Clifford Dupont Under common law, detention without trial was unlawful and under the 1961 Constitution, the previous legally drafted foundational law, detention was only permitted if a state of emergency had been legally declared.) The General Division of the Rhodesian Court deemed the 1965 constitution and the legislature to be invalid, but did not revoke the Emergency Orders as having done so would have created a state of anarchy. The case was appealed to the High Court of Rhodesia, which ruled in a four to one decision that the government was the legal authority, and while not legally recognised, its operation and legislation were legal. Though they overturned the 1965 Emergency Order, a new Emergency Order was put in place in 1966 to replace the prior regulation. In 1968, an appeal was heard in the Judicial Committee of the Privy Council which held that the government and all legislation passed in Rhodesia by the government were invalid. Because of the ruling, Rhodesians were able to apply for British passports after 1968 which confirmed they were British subjects.

The UN Special Committee on Rhodesia continued negotiations between 1965 and 1967 with Britain. In 1966, the UN Security Council adopted Resolution 232 making economic sanctions against Rhodesia mandatory for all member states. In 1969, a constitution was passed to change the system of government to a republic. The 1969 Constitution of the Republic of Rhodesia had no official legal status. From the mid-1960s a liberation movement, pressed for changes in Rhodesia's governance. Diplomatic and internal conflict eventually led the government to begin negotiations in 1978 with African leaders. In January 1979, the Rhodesian government announced that it would be drafting a new constitution. Though approved by the European electorate, the UN Human Rights Commission rejected the constitution the following month. In April, the Rhodesian Parliament was dissolved and later that month a new constitution extending voting rights to Africans was enacted. On 30 May 1979, the Republic of Zimbabwe-Rhodesia was declared. In November the British Parliament passed the Southern Rhodesia Act which authorized the drafting of a new constitution and the following month passed the Zimbabwe Constitution Order which authorized the terms of the constitution that would be in force at Zimbabwe's independence. Its single provision on nationality provided that anyone who had been a citizen of Rhodesia by birth, descent, or registration would at independence be a citizen of Zimbabwe. Under provisions of the Zimbabwe Act 1979, persons who were CUKCs and acquired Zimbabwean nationality would cease to be British subjects, but other CUKCs who resided in Rhodesia would have a twelve-month transitional period to decide whether to remain CUKCs or register as Zimbabwean citizens.

=== Post-independence (1980–present) ===
Zimbabwe gained its independence after a four-month period of direct rule by Britain on 18 April 1980 and was admitted to the Commonwealth. Persons born after independence acquired nationality through birth in the country to a father who was Zimbabwean and living in the country. Children born abroad could acquire nationality if they were born to a father who Zimbabwean and who was also born Zimbabwe. Nationality could only be derived maternally if a child was illegitimate. Dual nationality was allowed and a provision was made for subsequent nationality legislation to provide qualifications for registration, eliminating the term naturalisation. When the Citizenship of Zimbabwe Act was adopted in 1984, it eliminated the possibility of dual nationality and required persons who had other nationality to renounce it by year's end in 1985. It allowed wives of Zimbabweans and persons who had resided in the country for at least five years to register as Zimbabweans. The legislation did not allow foreign husbands of Zimbabwean women the right to remain in the country. Further, immigration restrictions specified that only persons who had skills deemed critical and for which a shortage of persons with those skills existed were able to secure a residency permit.

In 1994 two cases, Rattigan v Chief Immigration Officer & Others and Salem v Chief Immigration Officer & Others, brought by Zimbabwean women challenged the law which did not allow their husbands to acquire residency. In the Rattigan case, it was argued that restricting a husband's movement restricted the movement of his wife, as well as their ability to cohabitate, and contravened her constitutional protections for free movement. In Salem, a further argument was made that restricting the right of a husband to work limited his ability to provide for his family and jeopardised his wife's ability to remain in the country in the event that she could not earn sufficient income to adequately support her family. In both cases, the Supreme Court ruled in favor of the wives. When the decisions were handed down in 1996, the Constitution was amended to remove the gendered discriminatory provisions to acquire nationality and replaced them with a provision that spouses could be registered on the same grounds as any foreigner. The amendment also changed the basis of acquisition of nationality to birth in Zimbabwe to a Zimbabwean removing jus soli provisions for foreigners and protections for foundlings and against statelessness.

In 2001, the Citizenship of Zimbabwe Act was amended allowing women an equal right to pass on their nationality to adopted children. It was revised again in 2003 to allow children born in the territory to parents who were nationals of a member country of the Southern Africa Development Community and residing in Zimbabwe working in unskilled occupations to apply for Zimbabwean nationality if they renounced other nationality. In 2009, a constitutional amendment extended nationality to children who had at least one parent or grandparent who was born in Zimbabwe or descended from a Zimbabwean regardless of where they were born. It also permitted dual nationality for those nationals born in Zimbabwe. A ruling in Piroro v Registrar General by the High Court in 2011, confirmed that dual nationality could not be prohibited for nationals by birth but that legislation could be drafted on its applicability to nationals by descent or by registration. A new constitution came in to force in 2013, which retained the provisions for acquisition and loss in prior legislation. In 2014, Farai D. Madzimbamuto, son of Stella Madzimbamuto, who had previously challenged the detainment statutes of Rhodesia, successfully won a case in the Constitutional Court of Zimbabwe challenging his right to dual nationality. The court ruled that under the 2013 constitution, Madzimbamuto was a Zimbabwean by birth, entitled to dual nationality, and the immigration department could not restrict his right to free movement or unconditional residence in Zimbabwe. As of 2018, legislation had not been introduced to amend the Citizenship of Zimbabwe Act to conform with changes in the constitution enacted since it was last modified in 2003.
