= Ted Beck =

Charles Edward Lukin 'Ted' Beck (some sources say Inkin; 1902–2008) was a South African judge who served on the courts of Rhodesia and Zimbabwe.

Born in Bloemfontein, Ted Beck was the son of Charles Arthur Beck KC. He attended Marist Brothers College, Bloemfontein, Christian Brothers College, Kimberley, and the University College of the Orange Free State. During the Second World War, he served with the South African Artillery, and was later seconded to the 52nd Field Regiment, Royal Artillery, serving with the Eighth Army. He saw service in Italy and attained the rank of captain. After the war, he was awarded the Rhodes scholarship for the Orange Free State and read Jurisprudence at Brasenose College, Oxford, graduating with first-class honours.

He was admitted as an advocate in 1949 and practiced in Bloemfontein until 1970, when he was appointed to the High Court of Rhodesia, in succession to the South African judge Sir Vincent Quénet. When Rhodesia became Zimbabwe, Beck became Judge President of the General Division of the High Court, and finally a Judge of Appeal. He later served on the courts of Transkei, Botswana, Lesotho, and Swaziland.
