= Long v Lloyd =

English contract law case concerning misrepresentation

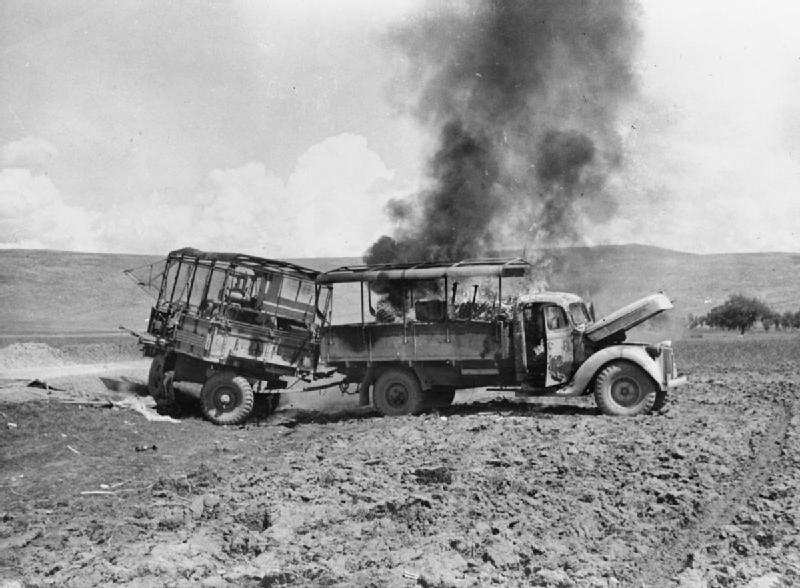
- Court: Court of Appeal of England and Wales
- Citation: [1958] 1 WLR 753

Keywords
- misrepresentation, rescission, affirmation

Long v Lloyd [1958] 1 WLR 753 is an English contract law case concerning misrepresentation. It exemplifies that if a contract is affirmed by the party who has been misrepresented, rescission will be barred.

== Facts ==
Lloyd advertised a lorry as being in 'exceptional condition'. Mr Long went to Mr Lloyd's premises to see it. Mr Lloyd then said it could do 40 mph. On a trial run from Hampton Court to Sevenoaks, he said it did 11 miles to the gallon. Mr Long bought it for £750. Two days later, driving to Rochester and back the dynamo stopped working, the oil seal was defective, there was a crack in the wheel and it did only five miles to the gallon. Mr Lloyd then said he would repair for half price of a reconstructed dynamo. Mr Long accepted. Then on another journey, being used by his brother on a business trip to Middlesbrough, it broke down. Mr Long sued to rescind.

== Judgment ==
Pearce LJ held that the contract had been affirmed when it was taken back after having been fixed. He emphasised that Mr Long 'chose' not to have an expert examine the lorry. On fuel consumption he had a reasonable time to test it, so 'on any view he must have accepted the lorry before he purported to reject it.'
