= Eric Jarvis =

Rhodesian lawyer and judge (1907–1987)

Eric William George Jarvis, CMG (22 November 1907 – 14 June 1987) was a Rhodesian lawyer and judge.

Jarvis was educated at the Salisbury High School and Rhodes University, before being admitted as an advocate of the High Court of Southern Rhodesia in 1929. He became a law officer of the Crown in 1934, became a KC in 1949, served as Solicitor-General of Southern Rhodesia from 1949 to 1955 and Attorney-General of Southern Rhodesia from 1955 to 1962. He was the drafter of the Law and Order (Maintenance) Act, 1960 and co-drafted the 1961 Southern Rhodesian constitution and election laws. He was appointed a CMG in 1961.

He was appointed a puisne judge of the High Court of Southern Rhodesia in 1963. He was subsequently promoted to a judge of appeal. He retired in 1977 upon reaching the retirement age and was succeeded by Harry Elinder Davies.
