= Ralph Morton =

Sir Ralph John Morton, CMG, OBE, MC (2 August 1896 – 7 March 1985) was a Southern Rhodesian lawyer and judge.

Born in the United Kingdom, Morton was educated at the University of Cambridge. During the First World War, he fought with the Royal Field Artillery and received the Military Cross in 1918.

Moving to Southern Rhodesia, Morton became Salisbury's first civil prosecutor in 1927, and became a government legal adviser the following year. He became Solicitor-General of Southern Rhodesia in 1934 and Attorney-General of Southern Rhodesia from 1944 until his elevation to the High Court of Southern Rhodesia in 1949. He retired in 1959. At the time of his retirement, he was the senior puisne on the High Court, having allegedly been passed over for Chief Justice due to his perceived leniency in sentencing.

After retiring, Morton chaired a commission of inquiry into Rhodesia's medical and health services. From 1963 to 1965, he was chairman of the Constitutional Council. After Rhodesia's unilateral declaration of independence, Morton moved to Johannesburg, where he died.

Morton was appointed OBE in 1947, CMG in 1954, and was knighted in 1960.
