= Joseph Vintcent Jr =

English footballer (1861 – 1914)

Joseph Vintcent
Personal information
- Full name: Joseph Vintcent
- Date of birth: 12 November 1861
- Place of birth: Mossel Bay, Cape Colony (now Western Cape, South Africa
- Date of death: 14 August 1914 (aged 52)
- Place of death: Bulawayo, Southern Rhodesia (now Matabeleland, Zimbabwe
- Position: Midfielder

Senior career*
Years	Team	Apps	(Gls)
1881–85	Old Carthusians		
1883	Cambridge University		
- * Club domestic league appearances and goals

Sir Joseph Vintcent (12 November 1861 – 4 August 1914) was a Cape Colony-born amateur footballer, who played for Old Carthusians in its 1881 FA Cup Final win, and who went on to become a senior judge in Southern Rhodesia.

== Football career ==
Vintcent was the son of Joseph Vintcent and Maria Catharina van Rijssen, and was born in Cape Colony, as his father had emigrated from the Netherlands for health reasons. He was educated at the Diocesan College in Rondebosch before going up to Charterhouse School (a leading nursery for footballers) and Trinity Hall College, University of Cambridge.

After leaving Charterhouse, Vintcent played for the Old Carthusians with his fellow old boys, and, with almost perfect timing, made his debut for the club in the fifth round of the 1880–81 FA Cup, as the O.C.s beat Clapham Rovers to reach the semi-final. He was credited with a goal in the semi-final win over Darwen, although it was properly an own goal, as goalkeeper Broughton caught his throw-in but was charged between the posts. He received praise for his contribution to the Carthusians' win in the final, "scarcely less" than that of the superstar Prinsep.

He received his Cambridge blue in football in 1883, playing as half-back in a now-outdated 2–2–6 formation as the Light Blues beat Oxford 3–2.

He missed out on a possible international cap after an ankle sprain in the London v Birmingham FA "mini" international in 1881. His final game in the FA Cup came in the Carthusians' 5–3 second-round win over Great Marlow in 1884–85. His final recorded match was for a Middlesex select against Oxford University at the Kennington Oval in January 1885; he signed off with a 3–2 win.

== Legal career ==
Called to the Bar in January 1885, he was admitted as an advocate in the Cape Colony the following month.

In March 1886, he was appointed Crown Prosecutor of British Bechuanaland. On 10 September 1894, he was promoted to the Bench, as Judge of the new High Court of Matabeleland. The Court was abolished four years later in favour of a new court, the High Court of Southern Rhodesia, and Vintcent was appointed Senior Judge.

He was made a Knight Bachelor in 1910 by Prince Arthur, Duke of Connaught and Strathearn, during the latter's visit to Southern Rhodesia.

== Personal life ==
In 1891, he married Hester Elizabeth Myburgh, with whom he had a son and a daughter. He died on 14 August 1914 of a paralytic seizure, six days after the death of his bench colleague of 18 years Mr Justice Watermeyer.

== Honours ==
Old Carthusians

- FA Cup winner: 1881
