= Edgar Tekere =

Zimbabwean politician (1937–2011)

- Edgar Zivanai "2-Boy" Tekere

Minister of Manpower Planning
- In office April 1980 – April 1989
- President: Canaan Banana (1980-87); Robert Mugabe (1987-89)
- Prime Minister: Robert Mugabe (1980-87); Abolished (1987-89)
- Vice PM: Simon Muzenda

Personal details
- Born: 1 April 1937 Nyang'ombe, Southern Rhodesia
- Died: 7 June 2011 (aged 74) Mutare, Zimbabwe
- Party: ZANU-PF (until 2008)
- Spouse(s): Ruvimbo, Pamela
- Relations: Herbert Chitepo, Maurice Nyagumbo,
- Children: Farai, Maidei
- Education: University of London
- Occupation: Politician
- Profession: Economist, Military Commander

Edgar Zivanai Tekere (1 April 1937 – 7 June 2011), nicknamed "2 Boy", was a Zimbabwean politician. He was the second and last Secretary General of the Zimbabwe African National Union (ZANU) who organised the party during the Lancaster House talks and served in government before his popularity as a potential rival to Robert Mugabe caused their estrangement.

== Pre-Independence ==
During the war, Tekere served on the ZANU high command, or Dare reChimurenga. He was detained by the Rhodesian government at Gonakudzingwa.

== Early life ==
Edgar Zivanai "2-Boy" (nom de guerre) Tekere was an early ally of Robert Mugabe within the Zimbabwe African National Union (of which he was a founder member in 1964) during the fight for independence and against the Rhodesian Front government of Ian Smith. Mugabe and Tekere, having served eleven and a half years in Hwa-Hwa Penitentiary & Gonakudzingwa State Prison as political prisoners of Ian Smith's government, immediately left upon release and crossed the Eastern Highlands Border in Mutare through the mountains by foot, following the Gairezi river trail to Seguranza military camp in Mozambique, to mastermind and kickstart guerilla warfare, aided by Samora Machel, in 1975. The Bush War or Second Chimurenga raged on. harassment of Tekere's close family members and relatives by the platoon of Rhodesian Front Soldiers, Selous Scouts, Police Special Branch and Central Intelligence Organisation, under the auspices of Ian Smith.

During these trying times Edgar Tekere received the code name/nickname ("Mukoma") by close family members and relatives. Tekere was elected by a democratic process to be the first ZANU-PF Secretary-General following Zimbabwe's independence.

== Independence celebration and Bob Marley ==
Edgar Tekere being the ZANU-PF Secretary General, personally invited Bob Marley to perform at Rufaro Stadium, for the official Zimbabwean Independence Celebration. Marley's music was inspirational to the guerilla fighters whilst they were in the bush fighting. More than 100,000 Zimbabweans attended the concert, and Bob Marley performed the song "Zimbabwe", an unofficial Zimbabwean anthem. He also stayed with Edgar Tekere during this tour date.

== Murder charge ==
When ZANU won the 1980 elections, Tekere was appointed as Minister of Manpower Planning in Mugabe's Cabinet. He followed his appointment by making a series of outspoken speeches that went far beyond government policy. Shortly after his appointment, on 4 August 1980 he greeted then-Prime Minister Mugabe and visiting President of Mozambique Samora Machel in combat fatigues, announcing that he was going "to fight a battle." Tekere and his bodyguards went looking for supporters of Joshua Nkomo's ZAPU outside Harare but, failing to find them, went onto a neighbouring farm and shot white farm manager Gerald Adams.."

=== Trial ===
Tekere retained his government post when he went on trial, in November 1980, together with seven bodyguards who were all former guerrilla fighters in the independence war. On 8 December the High Court, on a majority decision, found him not guilty of murder. Both assessors, over-ruling the judge, Mr Justice Pittman, held that while Tekere had killed Adams, he was acting in terms of an utter conviction that state security was at risk.

It is now believed that Tekere suffered from post traumatic stress disorder (PTSD) which led to his erratic behaviour.

At the trial, there was a lack of evidence led that Edgar Tekere and his platoon had first gone looking for ZAPU operatives before conducting a military style sweep of the farm on which the farmer was killed. There was also no evidence that he had said that he was proud to have killed Gerald Adams. State Counsel Chris Glaum did not put this to any of the defendants. The trial was presided over by Judge John Pitman J. There were two assessors, Christopher Navavie Greenland, a provincial magistrate, and Peter Khumbuyani Nemapare, a senior magistrate. The court was especially constituted to present as racially balance in that Judge Pitman was white, Greenland is mixed race, and Nemapare is black. It was the first and last time that a court was constituted in this way.

Tekere was represented by Louis Blom-Cooper QC, a flamboyant English counsel, and there were many confrontations between him and the presiding judge. The court was unanimous that Tekere was guilty of murder. However, by a majority, it found that as he had acted in "good faith" at the time, he was entitled to indemnification under a law that Ian Smith, the previous Rhodesian Prime Minister, had enacted despite widespread opposition to protect his security forces during the Bush War. Any member of the country's security forces was exempt from conviction in respect of any crime committed if, at the time of commission, such member was acting in "good faith", acting in terms of a genuinely held conviction that the state's security interests were being served.

Greenland wrote the judgement in which the two assessors over-ruled Pitman on this issue. It was the first time in the history of the country that assessors over-ruled a judge. The assessors found that Tekere presented with a personality and mindset which was completely consistent with an unreasonable but genuinely held belief that he was acting in the interest of state security with the confrontation between one of his men and the farmer, in which the latter was killed, an unfortunate consequence of the security sweep which Tekere genuinely believed needed to be conducted.

In his 2010 self-published book "The Other – without fear, favour or prejudice" Greenland states, for the first time, that Pitman made a surprising and inexplicable "about-face", having first been firmly of the view that Tekere was entitled to the indemnity and then changing his mind without proffering good reason.

== Rivalry with Mugabe ==
Tekere was dismissed from the government on 10 January 1981, a decision he was reported to be happy with; he retained the Secretary-Generalship of ZANU. During the same cabinet reshuffle Nkomo was demoted to minister without portfolio.

In April 1981 he was detained by Kenyan security forces to prevent him from speaking to students after giving a newspaper interview in which he said he was proud of the killing of Gerald Adams. In July, Tekere referred to some ZANU representatives as having "inherited the colonial mentality," which was straining relations between them and the party's supporters. Mugabe hit back by saying "Those who are complaining that the revolution is not continuing... are the most immoral and laziest in the party." Tekere was increasingly seen as a leader of a rival faction to Mugabe, and was dismissed as Secretary-General on 9 August with Mugabe taking the post himself.

After criticising corruption in the party, in August 1984 Tekere was elected to the Central Committee of ZANU-PF and carried shoulder-high from the Congress; he was also being supported by the White Zimbabwean community after opposing the farm squats by ZANU-PF supporters which he described as "donga watonga" (chaotic government). He was provincial chairman of ZANU-PF in Mutare.

== Zimbabwe Unity Movement ==
Tekere supported Mugabe at the 1985 elections but by October 1988 his consistent criticism of corruption resulted in his expulsion from the party. When Mugabe voiced his belief that Zimbabwe would be better governed as a one party state, Tekere strongly disagreed, saying "A one-party state was never one of the founding principles of ZANU-PF and experience in Africa has shown that it brought the evils of nepotism, corruption and inefficiency."

He ran against Robert Mugabe in the 1990 Presidential race as the candidate of the Zimbabwe Unity Movement, offering a broadly free market platform against Mugabe's communist-style economic planning. Edgar Tekere received unprecedented support for his opposition to Mugabe which led to massive election rigging by ZANU in order for Mugabe to win the election on 1 April 1990 receiving 2,026,976 votes while Tekere only got 413,840 (16% of the vote). At the simultaneous Parliamentary elections the ZUM won 20% of the vote but only two seats in the House of Assembly. Zimbabwe Unity Movement supporters were the targets of violent attacks from supporters of ZANU (PF) and five candidates were murdered.

== Later career ==
Tekere dropped out of sight after the election, which fuelled rumours that he had been planted as an opposition figure. In 1993, he attended a meeting with former white Prime Minister Ian Smith, former Mugabe ally Ndabaningi Sithole and Abel Muzorewa in which the formation of a unified movement to oppose Mugabe's government was discussed.

In 2005, he voiced his wish to stand as a ZANU (PF) candidate for the Senate of Zimbabwe but was rebuffed. In 2006 it was reported that he had rejoined ZANU (PF). A letter sent to him by ZANU (PF) national chairman John Nkomo dated 7 April 2006 said, "You will not exercise your right to be elected to any office in the party for a period of five years. You will be required to uphold all the duties of a member listed in Article 3, Section 18 of the amended Zanu PF constitution".

At a rally on 2 March 2008 in Highfield, a suburb of Harare, Tekere endorsed Simba Makoni, an independent candidate who was running against Mugabe in the March 2008 presidential election. Tekere said that he was "appointing [him]self principal campaigner for Mugabe's downfall".

On Sunday, 16 August 2009, at Sakubva Stadium in Mutare in Manicaland, Tekere was the guest of honour for the Movement for Democratic Change (MDC) in front of a crowd of 40,000 people that gathered to celebrate the tenth anniversary of the founding of the MDC, led by Prime Minister Morgan Tsvangirai.

== Death ==
Tekere died noon on Tuesday 7 June 2011, at Murambi Clinic, in Mutare, Manicaland. This occurred following a chronic prostate cancer, and had a medical history of suffering from undiagnosed post traumatic stress disorder (PTSD) as a military war veteran which brought about erratic intermittent alcoholism behaviour tendencies. Tekere was 74 years old.

== National hero status ==
Edgar 2-Boy Tekere was unanimously declared a national hero by the ZANU-PF Politburo.
