= Harry Elinder Davies =

Harry Elinder Davies, QC (24 June 1915 – 20 January 2005) was a Rhodesian and Zimbabwean lawyer and judge.

== Biography ==
Born in Bulawayo, Rhodesia (now Matabeleland, Zimbabwe), Davies was educated at Milton School, Bulawayo, St George's College, Salisbury, and the University of Cape Town, where he took the BA (Law), BCom, and LLB. He was admitted to the South Rhodesian Bar in 1939 and practised as an advocate in Bulawayo. He became a Queen's Counsel in 1956. A member of the Bar Council since 1950, he was chairman of the Bar Council and leader of the Bar from 1961 until his appointment to the bench in 1964.

Davies had a long-standing interest in the welfare of the African population, and was a longstanding member of the African Welfare Society. In 1955, Davies was elected unopposed to the Federal Assembly of the Federation of Rhodesia and Nyasaland as the South Rhodesian European member representing African interests, serving until 1963. From 1961 to 1963, he was chairman of the African Affairs Board.

In 1963, Davies resigned from the Federal Assembly, shortly before its dissolution, and was appointed President of the Special Court for the hearing of Income Tax Appeals. In 1964, he was appointed a judge of the General Division of the High Court of Southern Rhodesia. He continued in office after the Rhodesian unilateral declaration of independence on 11 November 1965. In 1968, after the Privy Council's decision in Madzimbamuto v Lardner-Burke, Davies announced that the Rhodesian courts would not consider this ruling binding as they no longer accepted the Privy Council as part of the Rhodesian judicial hierarchy.

From 1970 to 1977, he served concurrently as chairman of the Detainees Review Tribunal. In 1977, he was appointed a judge of appeal in the Appellate Division of the High Court of Rhodesia. He continued in his office for two months after the establishment of Zimbabwe as an independent republic within the Commonwealth on 18 April 1980, before retiring from the Appellate Division of the High Court of Zimbabwe on 24 June 1980.

After retiring from the Zimbabwean bench, Davies became a judge of the Supreme Court of Transkei in 1981. He retired as a permanent judge in 1992, but continued to sit in an acting capacity until 1996. He died in Grahamstown, South Africa in 2005.
