= John Pittman (judge) =

John Bernard Pittman was a South African-born judge Rhodesian and Zimbabwean lawyer, politician, and judge.

== Biography ==
The son of William Pittman, a South African legal academic and judge, John Pittman was born in Pretoria, Union of South Africa. He was educated at St. Andrew's Preparatory School and Rhodes University. During the Second World War, he served with the Union Defence Force as an artillery officer, losing a leg at the Battle of El Alamein.

He was called to the bar in 1947 and practiced in Johannesburg and Grahamstown until 1955, when he moved to Salisbury, Southern Rhodesia. He briefly went into politics, and acted as deputy speaker of the Legislative Assembly for a time. A member of the United Federal Party, Pittman was on its left, and introduced a motion in 1959 to allow the admission of non-whites to the Southern Rhodesia public service.

He became a QC in 1969 and was appointed to the Water Court, eventually becoming the court's senior judge, as well as serving on numerous courts and boards.

Pittman was promoted to the High Court of Rhodesia in 1976, the only judge to be promoted from the Water Court bench. He remained in office after Rhodesia's transition to majority rule. In 1980, he tried the ZANU-PF minister Edgar Tekere and his bodyguards for murder: Pittman voted to convict, but he was overruled by his two assessors.
