= Rhodesian passport =

Passport of the Republic of Rhodesia that were issued to Rhodesian citizens

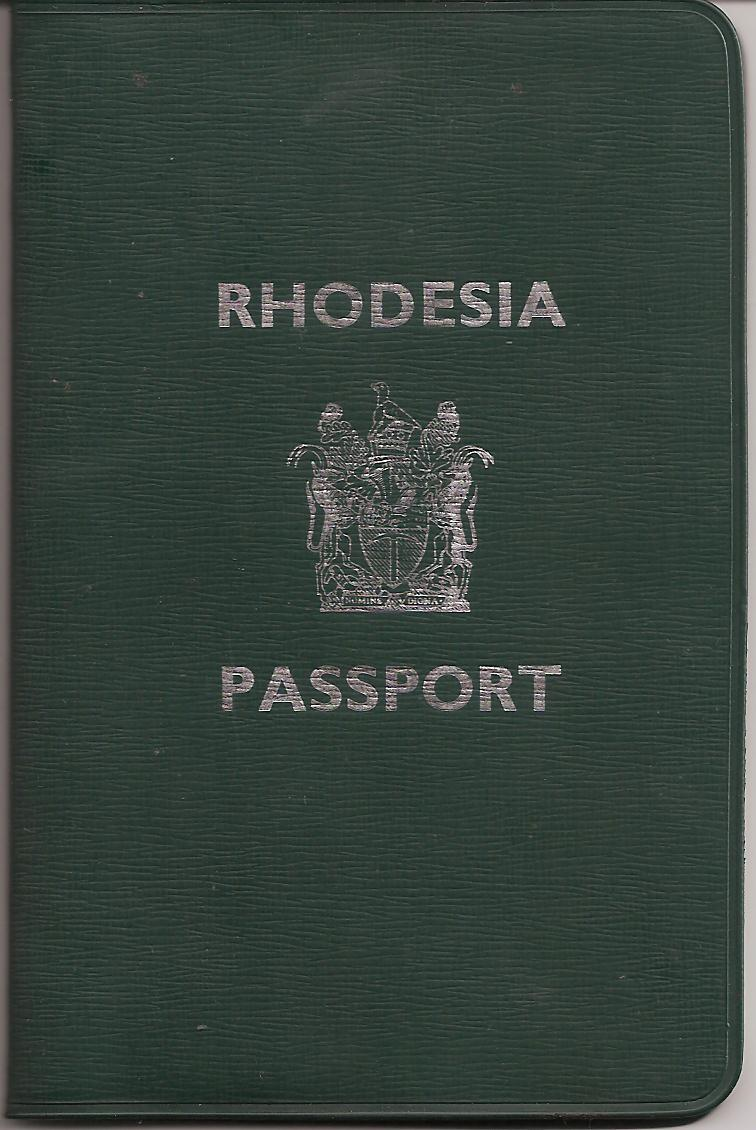
- Type: Passport
- Issued by: Rhodesia
- First issued: 1965
- Eligibility: Rhodesian citizenship

Rhodesian passports were passports issued by the government of Rhodesia to its citizens for purposes of international travel. They are no longer issued, having been superseded by Zimbabwean passports in 1980, with the country's reconstitution and renaming as Zimbabwe. Rhodesian passports were ostensibly valid for travel by Rhodesians anywhere in the world, but in practice they were accepted by very few countries.

Following Rhodesia's Unilateral Declaration of Independence from Britain on 11 November 1965, Rhodesia's predominantly white minority government was unrecognised, causing the legality of its passports to become ambiguous. From 1968, United Nations Security Council Resolution 253 called on all UN member states to refuse entry to Rhodesian passport holders. The passports continued to be accepted by some non-UN countries, such as Switzerland, as well as a few UN members, including Portugal and South Africa, but they were not recognised as legal by most foreign powers. For example, when Rhodesian politicians travelled to the United States on official business during the 1970s, they were issued visas on separate pieces of paper, their passports unstamped.

The dispute surrounding the passports made it difficult for many Rhodesians to travel overseas, and also affected Rhodesia's entry into international sports competitions, such as the Olympic Games, the FIFA World Cup, and the Davis Cup. Because a Rhodesian passport was of little use in practice, many Rhodesian citizens obtained documents issued by other governments, most commonly British passports, which according to a 1978 report from the International Committee of the Red Cross were held by over two-thirds of the country's white population.

When the country was reorganised under black majority rule in June 1979 as Zimbabwe Rhodesia, its passports were renamed appropriately. Following the Lancaster House Agreement of December 1979, and the imposition of temporary British rule, applications for Zimbabwe Rhodesian passports trebled; Zambia announced in March 1980 that it would start accepting Zimbabwe Rhodesian travellers. These passports continued to be issued for a few months following the recognised independence of Zimbabwe in 1980, stopping only when stocks were exhausted. Since then, Zimbabwean passports have been issued and used by the country's citizens.

== Acceptance ==
Following Rhodesia's 1965 Unilateral Declaration of Independence from Britain, which went unrecognised by the international community, the breakaway state's passport holders faced various difficulties in overseas travel. United Nations Security Council Resolution 253 (passed in 1968) called upon all United Nations members to refuse entry to persons holding passports issued by "the illegal régime in Southern Rhodesia". However, Portugal (a UN member) as well as Switzerland and South Africa (both non-UN members at the time) accepted Rhodesian passports for travel. There were exceptions for "study and compassionate reasons" as well. The United Kingdom and the United States occasionally permitted entry to Rhodesian passport holders, particularly blacks.

There were a number of instances of refusal of admission to Rhodesian passport holders over the years. The United Kingdom routinely refused admission. In one case in 1969, the Rhodesian government accused the British Home Office of detaining a Rhodesian man, Henry Ncube for three days while he transited in the United Kingdom on the way from the United States due to his refusal to apply for a British passport; Ncube was ill at the time, and reportedly did not want to apply for a British passport because he feared it could bring him trouble with Rhodesian authorities upon his return to the country. Though it was initially speculated that Australia might adopt an unofficial policy of leniency towards Rhodesian passport holders, in fact Australia also routinely refused admission to Rhodesian passport holders. However, some Rhodesians were able to proceed to Australia as migrants, for example 170 such persons in 1977.

=== Impact ===
The Rhodesian Olympic team was barred from participating in the 1968 Summer Olympics in Mexico. The refusals applied equally to black and white holders of Rhodesian passports. In September 1969, South Korea refused admission to the mostly black Rhodesian national football team, which had been billed to contest a FIFA World Cup qualifying tournament there for nearly a year. The Korean government refused to budge on this, but FIFA was adamant that Rhodesia should play; a compromise was eventually worked out whereby the winner of the series would play Rhodesia in a "neutral" country that would admit the Rhodesians.

The winning team from the Korean series, Australia, ultimately took on and defeated Rhodesia in Lourenço Marques, Portuguese Mozambique over three games in November 1969. Attitudes towards Rhodesia's participation in the Davis Cup international tennis tournament were varied; having first entered in 1963, it was allowed to play up to and including 1970. Following five years of absence afterwards, it returned for two years during the late 1970s, taking part in the 1975 and 1976 competitions, but thereafter did not play again under the Rhodesian name, returning in 1981 as Zimbabwe.

== Alternative documents ==
Rhodesian passport holders who needed to travel to other countries often ended up applying for other travel documents, including passports issued by other governments. One widely noted case involved Air Vice-Marshal Harold Hawkins, the commander of the Royal Rhodesian Air Force, who had emigrated to Rhodesia from Australia in 1946. To circumvent the logistical issues associated with his Rhodesian citizenship he successfully reapplied for an Australian passport in 1968. Many others resorted to Garry Davis' World Passport, a legally ambiguous document which few authorities recognised. In 1978, as the Rhodesian Bush War intensified, the International Committee of the Red Cross (ICRC) estimated that 260,000 white Rhodesians had British passports, while only 100,000 had Rhodesian passports; the ICRC was making preparations to issue laissez-passers to the latter if they needed to leave the country at the end of the war.

Rhodesian officials were sometimes issued single-sheet travel letters to facilitate their entry into or exit from countries applying sanctions, for the purposes of negotiations. When Frederick Crawford went to London to discuss Rhodesia's ban from the 1968 Olympics, his British passport was seized and he departed the country on an emergency travel letter; he then declared his intention to apply for a Rhodesian passport if his British passport was not returned. Similarly, the United States Carter administration's Department of State issued visas to Prime Minister Ian Smith and his ministers on separate pieces of paper rather than stamping their Rhodesian passports, which the U.S. regarded as illegal.

== Transitional passports ==
When Rhodesia was reconstituted under black majority rule as Zimbabwe Rhodesia in June 1979, following the Internal Settlement the previous year, the passports its government issued were altered appropriately. However, the new administration failed to gain international acceptance. With the Lancaster House Agreement of December 1979, the Bush War formally ended and the country was placed under the temporary control of Britain while fresh elections were organised and held, after which recognised independence would be granted, with the country's name shortened to Zimbabwe. Passports continued to be issued during this interim period, and were first accepted by Zambia in March 1980; around this time the number of Zimbabwe Rhodesian passport applications trebled. Following the independence of Zimbabwe in April 1980, Zimbabwean passports came into use, though the old documents continued to be issued until stocks were exhausted.

== Camouflage passports ==
More recently, a market has developed on the internet for "camouflage passports", false documents intended to mask a traveller's true nationality. These "passports" look largely genuine, but purport to be issued by country that no longer exists, or which has changed its name. The theory is that such a document could provide cover for a traveller whose genuine passport could cause him to be targeted by terrorists. Camouflage passports often claim to be Rhodesian. Though these documents hold no authenticity, Mark B. Salter wrote in 2003 that they were sometimes carried by members of the United States Armed Forces "when off duty in 'difficult' countries".
