= Edward Pearce, Baron Pearce =

British judge (1901–1990)

The Right Honourable The Lord Pearce PC

Lord of Appeal in Ordinary
- In office 1962–1969

Personal details
- Born: 9 February 1901 Sidcup, Kent England
- Died: 26 November 1990 (aged 89)

Edward Holroyd Pearce, Baron Pearce, PC (9 February 1901 – 26 November 1990) was a British barrister and judge. He served as a Lord of Appeal in Ordinary from 1962 until 1969. In 1971–72, he chaired the Pearce Commission, which was charged with testing the acceptability of a proposed constitutional settlement in Rhodesia.

== Early life and career ==
Edward Holroyd Pearce was born in Sidcup in Kent, the second child (he was preceded by a sister and followed by a brother and two more sisters) of John William Ernest Pearce, headmaster of a preparatory school, and Irene Pearce, née Chaplin, daughter of Holroyd Chaplin. He was educated at Charterhouse School and Corpus Christi College, Oxford, of which he was a scholar and where he took a First in Honour Moderations in 1921 and a Third in literae humaniores in 1923. He was elected an honorary fellow of Corpus Christi in 1950.

Called to the bar by Lincoln's Inn and the Middle Temple in 1925, he practiced in the King's Bench and Probate, Divorce and Admiralty Divisions of the High Court. In the 1930s, Pearce was forced to leave legal practice for a time because of tuberculosis. He spent some time in Switzerland, where he acquired a lifelong passion for oil painting, before returning to the Bar. He later exhibited regularly at the Royal Academy and mounted one-man exhibitions as well, sometimes also exhibiting together with his wife, a watercolourist. He became a member of the Royal Society of British Artists in 1940.

Exempt from military service on medical grounds, Pearce continued to practice at the bar during the Second World War; he was appointed King's Counsel in 1945. He became deputy chairman of the East Sussex Quarter Sessions in 1947, was elected a bencher of Lincoln's Inn in 1948 and served as its treasurer in 1966.

== Judicial career ==
On 14 October 1948, Pearce was appointed a Justice of the High Court, receiving the customary knighthood on 29 October. He was initially assigned to the Probate, Divorce and Admiralty Division, before being transferred to the Queen's Bench Division in 1954. He was made a Lord Justice of Appeal on 30 April 1957, and sworn of the Privy Council. On 19 April 1962, Pearce was made Lord of Appeal in Ordinary and was created a life peer with the title Baron Pearce, of Sweethaws in the County of Sussex.

In his capacity as a member of the Judicial Committee of the Privy Council, Pearce sat on the case of Madzimbamuto v Lardner-Burke, concerning the constitutionality of Rhodesia's Unilateral Declaration of Independence. He dissented from the majority decision of Lord Reid, who held that the Unilateral Declaration was unconstitutional and the detention orders in issue were therefore unlawful. While agreeing that the Declaration was unlawful, Pearce would have held that the detention orders in issue were lawful, on the basis that they had been issued by a government which was in de facto control of Rhodesia, and therefore should be applied by the courts.

He retired as Lord of Appeal in Ordinary in 1969.

== Post-judicial career and later life ==
After his retirement from the bench, Lord Pearce became chairman of the Press Council in 1969, serving until 1974. From 1969 until 1976, he was chairman of the Appeals Committee of the Takeover Panel.

In 1971–72, he chaired a commission (known as the Pearce Commission) tasked with testing the acceptability of a proposed constitutional settlement in Rhodesia negotiated between Sir Alec Douglas-Home and Ian Smith. The four-person commission reported in May 1972: it described white, coloured and Asian Rhodesians as in favour of the terms by 98%, 97% and 96% respectively, and black citizens as against them by an unspecified large majority. As a result, the proposals were shelved, though not immediately abandoned.

In his later years Lord Pearce suffered from hip problems. Shortly before his death, he auctioned a sculpture, which he had acquired for £7 in 1951, at Sotheby's. The work, identified as a sculpture by Adriaen de Vries, was sold for £6.82 million.

== Family ==
In 1927, he married Erica Priestman (d. 1985), daughter of Bertram Priestman, RA. They had two sons, James and Bruce, both of whom became QCs (the eldest also becoming a circuit judge) and predeceased him.

== Selected judgments ==
- Long v Lloyd [1958] 1 WLR 753
- McCutcheon v David MacBrayne Ltd [1964] 1 WLR 125
- Madzimbamuto v Lardner-Burke [1969] 1 AC 645
- Anisminic v Foreign Compensation Commission [1969] 2 AC 147

== Arms ==
Coat of arms of Edward Pearce, Baron Pearce
Motto Humani Nil Alienum

Media offices
Preceded by Patrick Devlin	Chairman of the Press Council; 1969–1974	Succeeded by Hartley Shawcross
