= Madzimbamuto v Lardner-Burke =

British court decision on Rhodesian Declaration of Independence

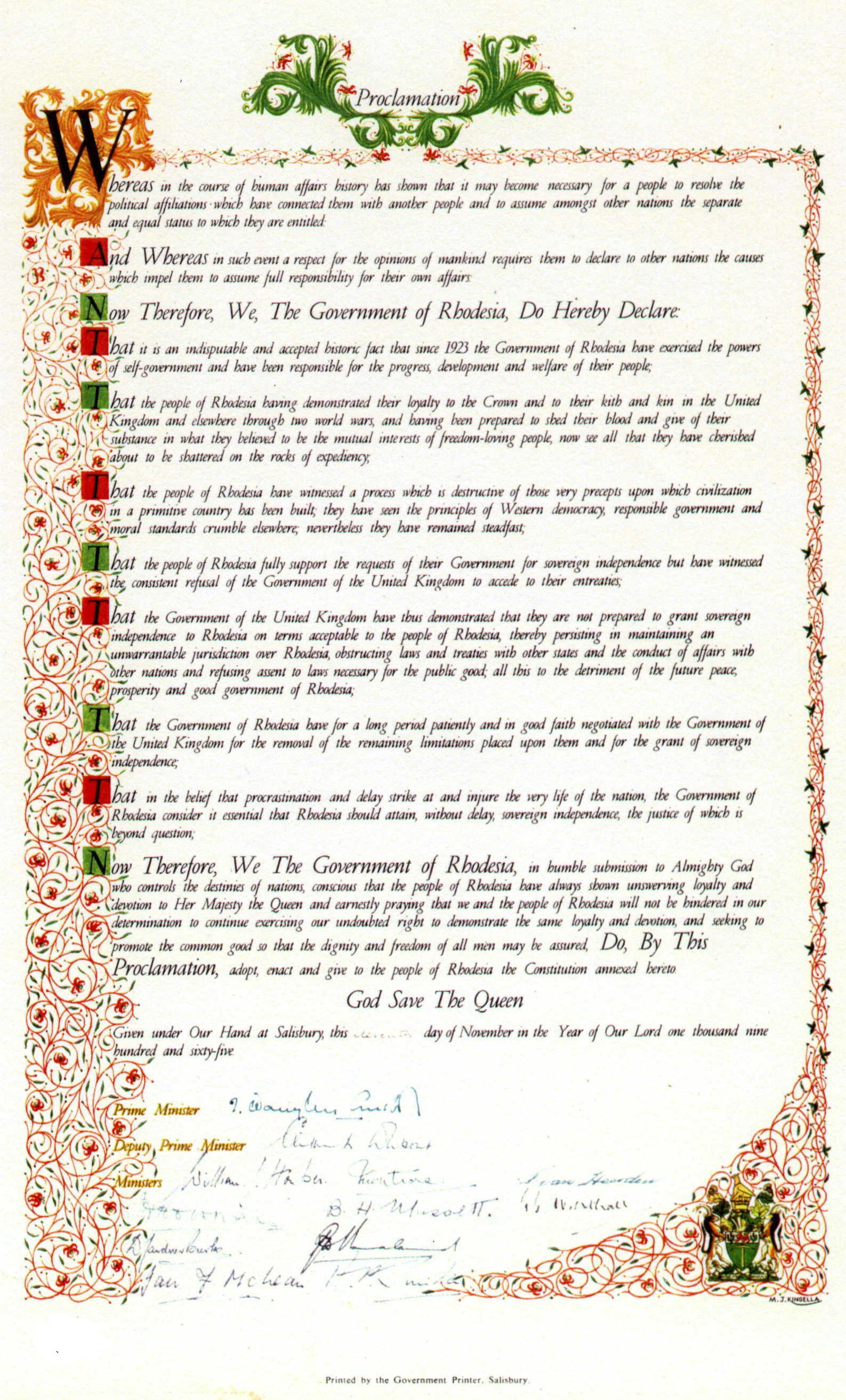
- The Rhodesian Unilateral Declaration of Independence, in issue in the court case
- Court: Judicial Committee of the Privy Council
- Full case name: Stella Madzimbamuto v Desmond William Lardner-Burke and Frederick Phillip George
- Decided: 23 July 1968
- Citations: [1968] UKPC 18; [1968] 3 WLR 1229; [1968] 3 All ER 561; [1969] 1 AC 645

Case history
- Appealed from: High Court of Southern Rhodesia

Holding
- As the United Kingdom retains full sovereignty over Southern Rhodesia, acts done by the de-facto government should not be recognised.; Entrenchment provisions do not limit Parliament; Parliament can always legislate contrary to them.; Parliament's laws remain supreme and legally binding in Rhodesia despite its UDI, and no political revolution may diminish Parliament’s legal sovereignty.

Court membership
- Judges sitting: Lord Reid, Lord Morris of Borth-y-Gest, Lord Pearce, Lord Wilberforce, Lord Pearson

Case opinions
- Decision by: Lord Reid
- Dissent: Lord Pearce

Madzimbamuto v Lardner-Burke and another [1969] 1 AC 645 is a decision of the Judicial Committee of the Privy Council on United Kingdom constitutional law and the constitutional law of Rhodesia. The case was brought by Stella Madzimbamuto, to challenge the detention of her husband, Daniel Madzimbamuto, by the government of Rhodesia. The case raised the issue of the legality of the Unilateral Declaration of Independence made by Rhodesia in 1965. The case is often cited in relation to the legal status of constitutional conventions in United Kingdom constitutional law.

== Facts ==
Southern Rhodesia was a British crown colony which had been granted limited self-government in 1923 under white minority rule. After it became clear that the British government did not intend to block the "Wind of Change" that had led to independence in much of Africa after 1958, Rhodesian politicians began to contemplate secession from the British Empire and Commonwealth as a white-ruled state. A Unilateral Declaration of Independence (UDI) was issued in 1965 by the lawfully constituted government of Ian Smith and purported to establish the new sovereign state of Rhodesia. However, in common with other states, the United Kingdom considered the UDI to be illegal and its parliament passed the Southern Rhodesia Act 1965 to permit the colonial governor to dismiss Smith's government. Smith's government refused to recognize the validity of their dismissal and continued to act as Rhodesia's de facto government until 1979.

UDI occurred against the backdrop of the Rhodesian Bush War (1964–1979) and in 1965, shortly before UDI, the colonial legislature had enacted a series of Emergency Power Regulations. Daniel Madzimbamuto, an African nationalist, was detained under section 21 of the Regulations as a person "likely to commit acts in Rhodesia which are likely to endanger the public safety, disturb or interfere with public order or interfere with the maintenance of any essential service". The 1965 Regulations expired in 1966. The state of emergency was then prolonged by the post-UDI legislature which also issued a series of new Emergency Regulations. Madzimbamuto's detention was renewed under these new Regulations.

Madzimbamuto's wife, Stella, challenged the legality of her husband's detention on the ground that the prolongation of the state of emergency was unlawful. Rhodesia's Minister of Justice, Desmond Lardner-Burke, who had made the Order for Madzimbamuto's continuing detention, was named as Respondent.

== Judgments of Rhodesian courts ==
=== High Court ===
The case was first heard in the High Court of Southern Rhodesia. Lewis J. (Goldin J. concurring) found Madzimbamuto's detention to be lawful. Though he acknowledged that Rhodesia's 1965 Constitution, made without reference to the British Parliament and proclaimed through the UDI, was not lawfully made he nevertheless decided to recognize the legislative power of the new Rhodesian government as doing otherwise would create a legal vacuum. Therefore, the actions of the post-1965 Smith government, including the renewal of Madzimbamuto's detention, were lawful.

=== High Court (Appellate Division) ===
The case was then appealed to the Appellate Division of the High Court. The Appellate Division (Beadle CJ, Quenet JP, Macdonald JA; Fieldsend AJA, dissenting) ruled that a fresh detention order had to be made in order for Madzimbamuto's detention to continue under the 1966 regulations, but found that the Smith government was the de facto government of Rhodesia by virtue of its "effective control over the state's territory", and could "lawfully do anything which its predecessor could lawfully have done". However, the Appellate Division withheld de jure recognition of the Smith government. The Appellate Division also declined to recognize the validity of the 1965 Constitution, ruling instead that the 1961 constitution still applied to the territory.

=== Application for leave to appeal ===
Stella Madzimbamuto then applied to the Appellate Division for leave to appeal to the Judicial Committee. The Appellate Division denied the application. She then applied to the Judicial Committee for special leave to appeal, which was granted by means of an Order in Council on the recommendation of the Judicial Committee.

== Decision of the Privy Council ==
The Judicial Committee heard oral arguments on the merits of the appeal over ten days from May to July 1968. Sydney Kentridge and Louis Blom-Cooper appeared for Madzimbamuto. The Rhodesian Minister of Justice, Lardner-Burke, did not participate in the appeal.

Lord Reid gave the majority judgment of the Judicial Committee. He held that the 1965 Emergency Regulations and the detention order made under it were unlawful. Sovereignty over Southern Rhodesia rested with the Crown of the United Kingdom and had not been affected by the unilateral declaration of independence. Hence, the United Kingdom retained full law-making powers over Southern Rhodesia. Since the United Kingdom deprived the Southern Rhodesian legislature of its law-making powers through the Southern Rhodesia Act 1965, the Emergency Regulations made by that legislature were invalid.

Lord Reid rejected arguments that parliamentary sovereignty in the United Kingdom could be limited by constitutional conventions. In obiter dictum, he also questioned whether the constitutional convention concerning Rhodesia's self-government continued to apply, in light of the Rhodesian government's rejection of British sovereignty through the UDI:

It is often said that it would be unconstitutional for the United Kingdom Parliament to do certain things, meaning that the moral, political and other reasons against doing them are so strong that most people would regard it as highly improper if Parliament did these things. But that does not mean that it is beyond the power of Parliament to do such things. If Parliament chose to do any of them the Courts could not hold the Act of Parliament invalid. It may be that it would have been thought before 1965 that it would be unconstitutional to disregard this convention. But it may also be that the unilateral Declaration of Independence released the United Kingdom from any obligation to observe the convention. Their Lordships in declaring the law are not concerned with these matters. They are only concerned with the legal powers of Parliament.

Lord Pearce gave a dissenting judgment, in which he concluded that the detention orders should be upheld under the doctrine of necessity. Although he agreed that the United Kingdom retained full sovereignty over Southern Rhodesia, acts done by the de facto government of the territory should be recognized if such acts are necessary for "the ordinary orderly running of the country".

== See also ==
- Hahlo, Herman H. (1969). "The Privy Council and the Gentle Revolution" (PDF). McGill Law Journal. 16 (1): 92–112. Archived from the original (PDF) on 21 January 2019.
- Marshall, H. H. (1968). "The Legal Effects of U. D. I. (Based on Madzimbamuto v. Lardner-Burke)". International and Comparative Law Quarterly. 17 (4): 1022–1034. doi:10.1093/iclqaj/17.4.1022. JSTOR 756683.
- Saki, Otto (10 July 2014). "Revisiting the Daniel Madzimbamuto case". Financial Gazette (Zimbabwe).
