= Anthony Scott Hathorn =

South African lawyer

Anthony 'Anton' Scott Hathorn (1908–1967) was a South African lawyer who served as a justice of the High Court of Southern Rhodesia between 1954 and 1967.
