= Visa policy of Zimbabwe =

Policy on permits required to enter Zimbabwe

Visitors to Zimbabwe must obtain an e-Visa unless they are citizens from one of the visa-exempt countries or citizens who may obtain a visa on arrival.

As of November 2014, Zimbabwe and Zambia also offer a universal tourist visa.

== Visa policy map ==
Visa policy of Zimbabwe Zimbabwe Visa not required Visa on arrival / eVisa eVisa

== Visa exemption ==
Citizens of the following countries and territories may enter Zimbabwe without a visa for up to 3 months (unless otherwise noted):

- Angola
- Antigua and Barbuda
- Bahamas
- Barbados
- Belize
- Botswana
- Cyprus
- Democratic Republic of Congo
- Eswatini
- Fiji
- Ghana
- Grenada
- Hong Kong^{1}
- Jamaica
- Kenya
- Kiribati
- Lesotho
- Madagascar
- Malawi
- Malaysia
- Maldives
- Malta
- Mauritius
- Mozambique^{2}
- Namibia
- Nauru
- Saint Kitts and Nevis
- Saint Lucia
- Saint Vincent and the Grenadines
- Samoa
- Seychelles
- Singapore
- Solomon Islands
- South Africa
- Tanzania
- Tonga
- Trinidad and Tobago
- Tuvalu
- Uganda
- Vanuatu
- Zambia

_{1 - 6 months}

_{2 - 30 days}

In addition, visa exemption applies to holders of passports issued to residents of the following territories:

Holders of the following British passports:

British Overseas Territories Citizens:

- Cayman Islands
- Montserrat
- Turks and Caicos Islands

Holders of the following Dutch passports:

- Aruba residents

- Holders of diplomatic or official/service passports of any country do not require a visa for up to 3 months.

== Visa on arrival ==
Citizens of the following countries and territories may obtain a visa on arrival:

- European Union member states (except Cyprus and Malta)

- Albania
- Algeria
- Andorra
- Argentina
- Armenia
- Australia
- Azerbaijan
- Bahrain
- Belarus
- Bhutan
- Bosnia and Herzegovina
- Brazil
- Brunei
- Burundi
- Canada
- Cape Verde
- Chile
- China
- Comoros
- Costa Rica
- Cuba
- Dominican Republic
- Ecuador
- Egypt
- El Salvador
- Equatorial Guinea
- Ethiopia
- Georgia
- Guatemala
- Guyana
- Haiti
- Honduras
- Iceland
- India
- Indonesia
- Iran
- Israel
- Japan
- Kazakhstan
- Kuwait
- Kyrgyzstan
- Liechtenstein
- Macao
- Marshall Islands
- Mexico
- Micronesia
- Moldova
- Monaco
- New Zealand
- Nicaragua
- Norway
- Palau
- Palestine
- Panama
- Papua New Guinea
- Paraguay
- Peru
- Russia
- Rwanda
- San Marino
- Sao Tome and Principe
- Senegal
- Serbia
- South Korea
- Suriname
- Switzerland
- Tajikistan
- Turkey
- Turkmenistan
- Ukraine
- United Arab Emirates
- United Kingdom
- United States
- Uruguay
- Uzbekistan
- Vatican City
- Venezuela

In addition, visa on arrival applies to holders of passports issued to residents of the following territories:

Holders of the following British passports:

British Overseas Territories Citizens:

- Bermuda
- British Virgin Islands

The visa is valid for 30 days (for business and tourist trips). Extension of stay is possible for up to 90 days if the purpose is tourism.

== Electronic visa (e-Visa) ==
External image
- Map of entry points with e-Visa facility

Foreign citizens can apply for all types of visas (tourist, business, resident and study visas) online through the Zimbabwe Department of Immigration's e-Visa system. Visa fee can be paid online or on arrival. It takes an average of two working days to obtain an e-Visa. However the period may vary due to a number of factors. The e-Visa is valid for 3 months from the date of issue.

It may be used to enter at one of the following crossings:

- Beitbridge
- Harare International Airport
- Chirundu
- Plumtree
- Forbes - Mutare
- Nyamapanda
- Kariba
- Victoria Falls
- Joshua Mqabuko Nkomo International Airport

== Universal visa ==
External image
- Map of entry points where universal KAZA visa can be obtained

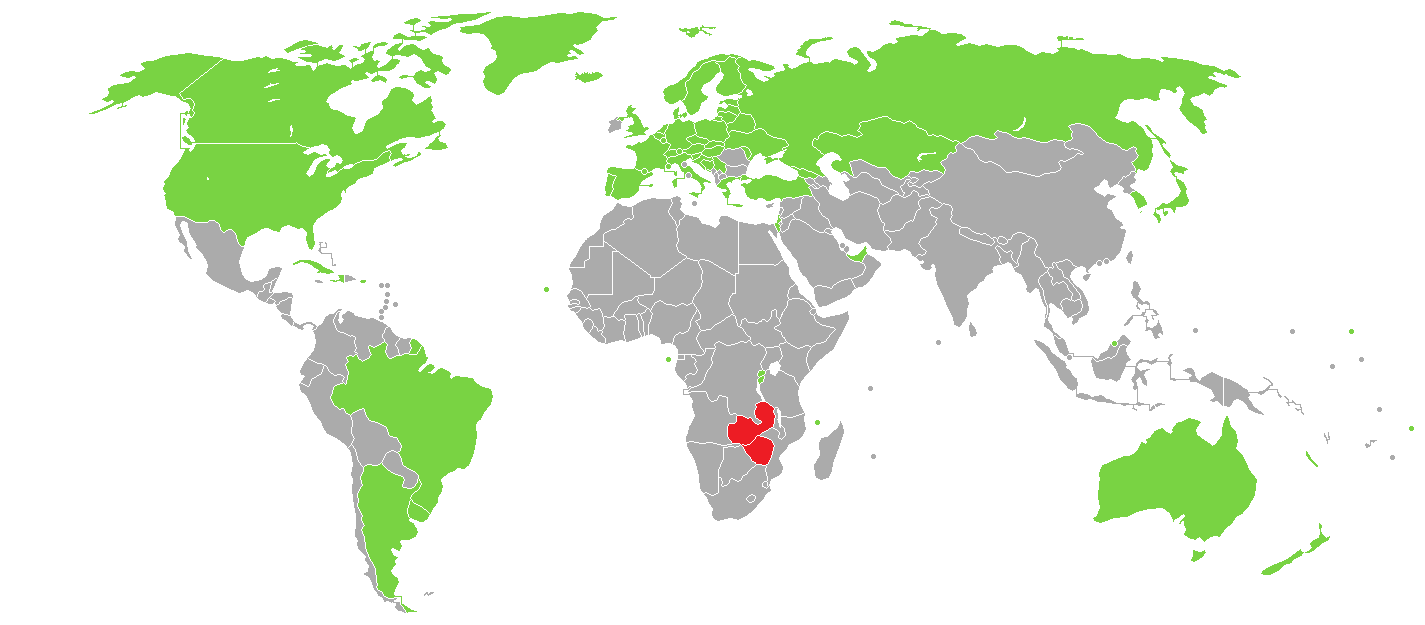
KAZA visa eligible countries

Zimbabwe and Zambia introduced a universal visa on 28 November 2014 called KAZA Visa. This visa can be obtained on arrival and is valid for both countries for visits up to 30 days while remaining within Zambia and Zimbabwe (including day trips to Chobe National Park in Botswana at Kazungula). In second phase Namibia, Angola and Botswana are expected to join the project. In third stage three SADC pilot countries are expected to join and in fourth stage all SADC countries are expected to become part of the universal visa project.

The universal visa project was suspended in 2015 due to running out of visa stickers and the expiry of the Memorandum of Understanding between the two countries. The new Memorandum was signed in December 2016, extending the list of eligible countries (including territories) from 40 to 65. In Zimbabwe it is issued at Kazungula, Victoria Falls, Zimbabwe, Harare International Airport and Victoria Falls Airport border crossings.

Eligible countries are:

- European Union member states (except Bulgaria, Cyprus, Ireland, Malta and Romania)

- Andorra
- Argentina
- Australia
- Belarus
- Bosnia and Herzegovina
- Brazil
- Brunei
- Burundi
- Canada
- Cape Verde
- Comoros
- Cuba
- Georgia
- Haiti
- Iceland
- Israel
- Japan
- Kazakhstan
- Liechtenstein
- Marshall Islands
- Moldova
- Monaco
- Netherlands
- Norway
- Russia
- Rwanda
- Samoa
- Sao Tome and Principe
- Serbia
- South Korea
- Switzerland
- Turkey
- Ukraine
- United Arab Emirates
- United Kingdom
- United States
- Uruguay

== See also ==
- Visa requirements for Zimbabwean citizens
