= Boswell Wilkie Circus =

Defunct South African circus

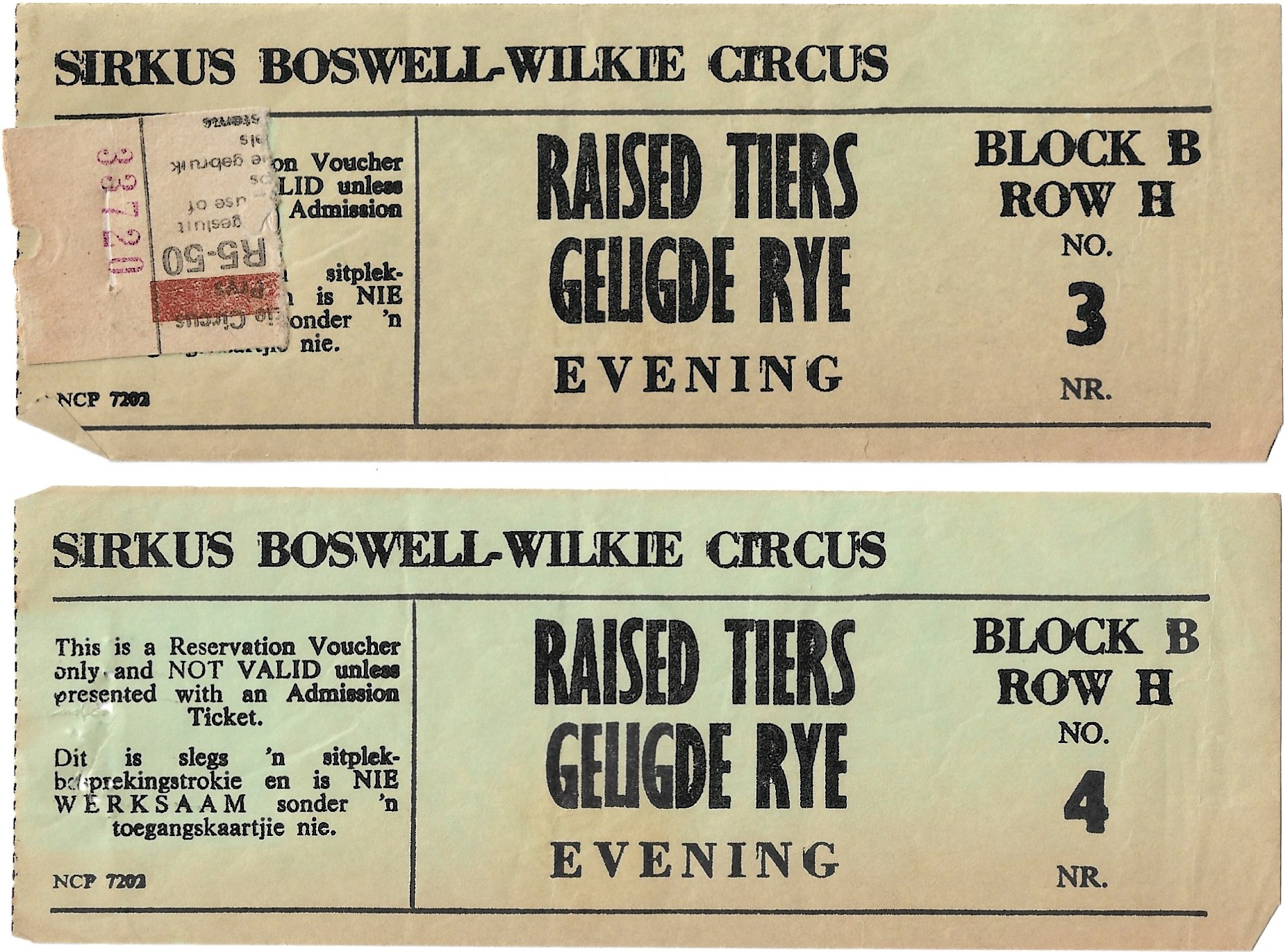

Origin
- Country: South Africa
- Founder(s): The Boswell Family
- Year founded: 1913 (113 years ago)
- Defunct: 2001 (original)

Information
- Traveling show?: Yes
- Circus tent?: Yes

The Boswell Wilkie Circus was a circus in South Africa that operated for around 75 years.

== Origins of the Boswell Gypsy family from the UK ==
The Boswells were known for centuries as one of the "big" English Romani families, often referred to as "Kings of the Gypsies." They were famous for being horse dealers, fortune tellers, and later, legendary circus performers.

The transition from traditional Romani traveling to the circus was a common path for the Boswell family in the 1800s. James Boswell (1826–1859): The patriarch of the circus branch was a celebrated clown and horseman in England. James Clements Boswell: His son took the family’s horse-riding skills and turned them into a formal traveling show, founding the first Boswell’s Circus in the UK in the late 1800s.

The family moved to South Africa in 1911.

== Circus origins ==
The Boswell family started the show in 1913 in Vrededorp, a Johannesburg suburb. The family did most of the entertainment. Jim, Walter and Alf did tumbling acts while Walter and Alf were clowns. Jim leaped from the springboard over ten ponies and they showed ponies, donkeys and dogs.

It was one of the first shows to allow racially mixed audiences and it became a staple in South Africa. It was one of the first to defy the apartheid government's ban on Sunday entertainment. Wilkie's daughter Susie began performing when she was three and her brother, Robert, was the youngest person to become a circus director and manager.

== First World War ==
During the First World War, the circus didn't perform much. From 1916 and after, the Boswells became known as the Boswell Brothers Circus and Menagerie, and they would eventually be called just the Boswell's Circus.

== Between the wars ==
In 1919, the Boswells had their first show since the war in Durban. The Boswells started to put effort into enlarging their circus. The first Asian elephant was bought in 1921 from Frank Willison, an American who had a circus in Madagascar. Jim also started training his first lion group. In 1924 Boswell’s Circus undertook a tour that took them through Southern and Northern Rhodesia (now Zimbabwe and Zambia), Mozambique, and up into the Belgian Congo for the first time. In 1932, during the worldwide recession, the Boswells held special charity performances in Durban. They gave a show in aid of the unemployed with the patronage of the Governor-General and the Countess of Clarendon. They also allowed unemployed people to sleep in the tent and they put on a performance for 1000 poor children and the elderly.

== Second World War ==
In 1941 there was great interest in the 21-year-old Helen Ayres of Pretoria. She handled the lions with great courage. She was the wife of Stanley, having married him in 1939. Three of the four original Boswell brothers retired in 1942.

== After the war ==
In 1953, the Boswell family entered into an agreement with the African Consolidated Theatres Organization. In November 1963, Jim and Syd Boswell sold the rest of their shares to the African Theatres. The terms of the settlement included that it would now be known as the Boswell-Wilkie Circus.

== Circus closing ==
The Boswell Wilkie Circus had its final show in October 2001. After difficult economic times in South Africa, the circus announced that the touring side would stop. Their final performance was on 13 October in Alberton, Gauteng. The circus then moved to Randvaal. The circus continued to perform just for corporate functions and Christmas parties.
