= Laurence Levy =

British neurosurgeon

- Born: Laurence Fraser Levy; 16 November 1921; London
- Died: 29 May 2007 (aged 85); London
- Education: King's College School; Peter Symonds School
- Alma mater: University College Hospital; New York University Hospital
- Known for: pioneering neurosurgeon
- Children: 2
- Scientific career
- Fields: Neurosurgery; Anatomy
- Workplaces: Royal Air Force; University of Zimbabwe

Professor Laurence Fraser Levy (16 November 1921 – 29 May 2007) was a pioneering neurosurgeon based in Harare, Zimbabwe, noted as the first neurosurgeon in Africa. He was Professor of Surgery and Anatomy at the University of Zimbabwe and managed to train about a dozen other neurosurgeons despite the lack of resources. He published more than 90 articles. He was also awarded a gold medal in 2005 by the World Federation of Neurosurgical Societies.

== Early life and education ==
Born in London on 16 November 1921, Levy was the son of Hyman Levy, professor of mathematics at Imperial College London, and his wife Marion, a schoolmaster's daughter. He was educated at the King's College School in Wimbledon, south London, and Peter Symonds School in Winchester. He studied medicine at University College Hospital in London, qualifying in 1945. After completing a spell of national service as a flight lieutenant in the Royal Air Force, stationed at Lübeck on West Germany's north coast, he was a demonstrator of anatomy at the University of Toronto in Canada from 1950, then a resident in neurosurgery at New York University Hospital in 1954 and, a year later, Bellevue Hospital. He returned to the UK in 1956. Neurosurgeons he cited as influences included Canada's Wilder Penfield and Thomas Hoen of New York University.

== Career ==
After failing to find a post in the British National Health Service, he signed on as a ship's surgeon on the way to China, and then in 1956 settled in Salisbury, the capital of Southern Rhodesia (today Zimbabwe), where he became consultant neurosurgeon to the city's hospitals. He remained there for the rest of his professional life, and was appointed professor of neurosurgery in 1972. A vocal opponent of apartheid in South Africa, he also opposed Rhodesia's Unilateral Declaration of Independence in 1965 and supported the black nationalist movements against Ian Smith's government during the Bush War of the 1970s. In 1966 he married Lorraine, a doctor of medicine with whom he had two sons.

In later life, Levy was concerned by the trend whereby doctors trained in the developing world would move to more advanced countries to work. In a 2003 article published in the BMJ he suggested that it might be beneficial for developing countries to give graduates qualifications that would not be recognised abroad.

By the time of his death in 2007, Levy was a trustee of the Epilepsy Support Foundation, an organisation he helped form in 1990 in Harare (as Salisbury was renamed in 1982). He had a very strong interest in epilepsy, beginning in the 1950s, when he treated Nicholas George as his seventh patient with epilepsy. At the age of 12, George was chased from a government school because of seizures and when he met Levy, he asked about forming an association to support people with epilepsy. The dream was realised year later on 17 April 1990 when the foundation was formed in Harare. George died in 1999, almost eight years before Levy's own death. The pair are highly credited for building it, which now runs the Nicholas George Epilepsy Centre and Professor Levy Epilepsy Clinic in Harare.
