= Vincent Quénet =

Sir Vincent Ernest Quénet (14 December 1906 – 3 February 1983) was a South African-born Southern Rhodesian judge.

== Biography ==
Quénet was born in Worcester, Cape Colony, and was educated at Worcester Boys' High School and the University of Cape Town. On graduation he was called to the Bar of the Cape Provincial Division of the Supreme Court of South Africa. He joined the Public Service of South Africa as a prosecutor, before entering private practice in Johannesburg in 1936. He became a King's Counsel in 1947, and was called to the English Bar at the Middle Temple in 1949.

He was appointed a Judge of the High Court of Southern Rhodesia in 1952. In 1961 he was appointed to the Federal Supreme Court of the Federation of Rhodesia and Nyasaland. With the dissolution of the Federation, he returned to the Southern Rhodesian bench in 1964 as the first Judge President of the Appellate Division of the High Court of Southern Rhodesia. He retired due to ill health in 1970. In 1975–76, he chaired a commission of inquiry on racial discrimination.

Quénet married Gabrielle Price, daughter of the Honourable Norman Price, a South African judge, in 1938; they had three sons.
