= High Court of Southern Rhodesia =

- Interactive map of High Court of Southern Rhodesia
- 17.825773349754147°S 31.051374249385947°E
- Established: 1899
- Dissolved: 1980
- Location: Salisbury and Bulawayo
- Coordinates: 17.825773349754147°S 31.051374249385947°E
- Authorised by: Constitution of Rhodesia

The High Court of Southern Rhodesia was a Southern Rhodesian court of record. It was established in 1899 and ceased to exist in 1980 on the establishment of Zimbabwe. Throughout its history, it functioned both as a trial court and an appellate court. It sat in Salisbury and Bulawayo.

== History ==
From 1890 to 1894, there was no High Court in Southern Rhodesia, and the Administrator possessed the jurisdiction of a superior court of record. In 1894, the High Court of Matabeleland was created. In 1898, it was abolished by the Southern Rhodesia Order in Council, 1898, which established a court of record, styled High Court of Southern Rhodesia. It officially opened on 1 January 1899.

The High Court was continued under the 1961 constitution, which made new provisions for the appointment of judges. With the dissolution of the Federation of Rhodesia and Nyasaland in 1963 and the disappearance of the Federal Supreme Court, a local appellate machinery had to be provided. Accordingly, the High Court was split into an Appellate Division and a General Division in 1964.

The High Court was continued under the 1965 constitution, which purported to rename it as the High Court of Rhodesia. The 1969 republican constitution preserved the High Court, which was now vested with "the judicial authority of Rhodesia". It was then briefly known as the High Court of Zimbabwe Rhodesia. Finally, it was superseded in 1980 by the High Court of Zimbabwe.

== Jurisdiction and powers ==
=== Original jurisdiction ===
The High Court had original jurisdiction in both civil and criminal matters. After 1964, its general jurisdiction was exercised by the General Division. Civil cases were heard by a single judge. Criminal cases were either heard by a judge and jury or by a judge sitting with two assessors. In 1927, Africans lost the right to be tried by a jury, whereas Europeans could elect between trial by judge and assessors or trial by jury.

=== Appellate jurisdiction ===
The High Court (and, after 1964, both of its divisions) had appellate jurisdiction.

After 1964, the Appellate Division heard appeals from decisions made by the General Division and all appeals arising from lower court verdicts except initial appeals against decisions by District Commissioners Courts, which were heard by the Court of Appeal for African Civil Cases. It was also the only court of appeal for matters arising from the Declaration of Rights.

=== Appeals from the High Court ===
For most of the High Court's existence, appeals lay to the Judicial Committee of the Privy Council, although the High Court refused to recognise the Privy Council's jurisdiction at some point after 1965.

An intermediate appeal lay in the Supreme Court of the Cape Colony. After the creation of the Union of South Africa, most of the appeals which formerly lay to the Supreme Court of the Cape Colony (renamed to the Cape Provincial Division) lay to the Appellate Division of the Supreme Court of South Africa. In 1931 appeals to the Cape Provincial Division were discontinued.

An alternative appeal was established by the Rhodesian Court of Appeal Act 1938, which created a Rhodesian Court of Appeal for Northern Rhodesia and Southern Rhodesia. In 1947, Nyasaland joined the court, which became the Rhodesia and Nyasaland Court of Appeal. In 1955, the right to appeal to the Appellate Division of the Supreme Court of South Africa was replaced with a right to appeal to the Federal Supreme Court of the Federation of Rhodesia and Nyasaland.

== Judges ==
=== Composition ===
The Court had a Senior Judge until 1928/1930, when his title was changed to that of Chief Justice. Other judges were designated as puisne judges. In 1964, consequent on the abolition of the Federal Supreme Court, the High Court was split into an Appellate Division and a General Division.

Under the scheme set up in 1964, the Appellate Division was composed of the Chief Justice, the Judge President, judges of appeal, and puisne judges designated for a limited period by the Chief Justice in consultation with the Judge President. The General Division was composed of the Chief Justice and puisne judges. The Judge President and judges of appeal could not sit in the General Division unless the Judge President gave his consent.

=== Appointment, tenure, and removal ===
Under the 1898 Order, judges were to be appointed by a secretary of state on the nomination of the British South Africa Company. Judges were to hold office during good pleasure, and could be removed from office by a secretary of state.

In 1923, the BASC's role in government ended: under the Southern Rhodesia Constitution Letters Patent of 1 September 1923, judges of the High Court were appointed by the Governor in Council, and could only be removed by him after joint addresses by the Legislative Council and Legislative Assembly in the same session for "proved misbehaviour or incapacity".

Under the 1961 constitution, judges could only be removed from office for inability to discharge the functions of his office or for misbehaviour, and only after an independent tribunal appointed by the Governor has recommended the judge's removal.

Under the 1965 constitution, judges could be required to state their acceptance of the new constitution and to take the oath of allegiance and judicial office set out in the constitution. The office of a judge who refused to accept the constitution would be deemed to be vacated on the day of the refusal. It was reported that Sir Hugh Beadle "showed the door" to Desmond Lardner-Burke, who tried to require him to take the oath.

=== Personnel ===
Unlike many other British colonies, Rhodesian judges were not chosen through the Colonial Office and the Colonial Legal Service. The first Rhodesian High Court judges were appointed from the Cape Colony. Later they were typically appointed from either the Rhodesian or South African bars. Some were directly appointed from the South African bench. Several law officers and legally-qualified politicians were also appointed to the bench.

Joseph Vintcent was the Court's first judge. In 1896 he was joined by a second judge, John Watermeyer. In 1914, both judges died within a week, so that the Court had no judge until a new appointment could be made. In 1930, the title of the Senior Judge was changed to that of Chief Justice. In 1933, a third judge was appointed for the first time. A Judge President and judges of appeal were first appointed in 1964.

There also existed a power to appoint acting judges.

=== List of judges ===
All the dates are those of substantive appointments.

- Sir Joseph Vintcent (1899–1914)
- John Philip [Fairbairn] Watermeyer (1899–1914)
- William Musgr[a]ve Hopley (1914–1919)
- (Sir) Alexander Fraser Russell (1915–1942)*
- Sir Clarkson Henry Tredgold (1920–1925)
- Sir Murray Bisset (1925/6?–1931)
- (Sir) Robert [Alfred] McIlwaine* (1930–1937) (Note: Acting judge in 1928 and 1929.)
- Sir Robert James Hudson (1933–1950)
- Vernon Arthur Lewis (1936–1950)
- Sir Robert Clarkson Tredgold (1943– )
- [Sir] Walter Eric Thomas (1944–1954)
- (Sir) Ralph John Morton (1949–1959)
- Sir Thomas Hugh William Beadle (1950–1977)
- Sir Vincent Ernest Quénet (1952–1970)
- Anthony Scott Hathorn (1954–1965)
- Sir John Murray Murray (1955–1961)
- John Richard Dendy Young (1956–1968)
- Hector Norman Macdonald (1958–1980)
- John Vernon Radcliffe Lewis (1960–1980)
- Israel Aaron Maisels (1961–1963)
- Eric William George Jarvis (1963–1977)
- (Sir) John Charles Rowell Fieldsend (1963–1968)
- Harry Elinder Davies (1964–1980)
- B Goldin (1965–1980) (Note: Appointed an acting judge in 1964,)
- J M Greenfield (1968–1974)
- John Burman Macaulay (1968–1976) (Note: Served as an acting judge after his retirement.)
- Charles Edward Lukin Beck (1970–1980)
- Walter Herbert Gordon Newham (1974–1980)
- Edgar Anthony Tweedie Smith (1975–1980)
- John Bernard Pittman (1976–1980)
- Ernest Jackson Whitaker (1977/8–)
- Anthony Ray Gubbay (1978–1980)
- Charles James Waddington (1979–1980)
- Hilary Gwyn Squires (1979–1980)
