= Politics of Zimbabwe =

- Polity type: Unitary democratic parliamentary republic with an executive presidency
- Constitution: Constitution of Zimbabwe

Legislative branch
- Name: Parliament of Zimbabwe
- Type: Bicameral
- Meeting place: New Parliament Building, Mount Hampden
- Upper house
- Name: Senate
- Presiding officer: Mabel Chinomona, President of the Senate
- Appointer: Senators
- Lower house
- Name: National Assembly of Zimbabwe
- Presiding officer: Jacob Mudenda, Speaker of the National Assembly
- Appointer: Members of Parliament

Executive branch
- Head of state and government
- Title: President of Zimbabwe
- Currently: Emmerson Mnangagwa
- Appointer: Joint session of Parliament
- Cabinet
- Name: Cabinet of Zimbabwe
- Current cabinet: Third Cabinet of Emmerson Mnangagwa
- Leader: Emmerson Mnangagwa
- Deputy leader: Vice-President of Zimbabwe
- Appointer: President of Zimbabwe
- Headquarters: Munhumutapa Building, Samora Machel Avenue / Sam Nujoma Street, Harare, Zimbabwe

Judicial branch
- Name: Judiciary of Zimbabwe
- Courts: Constitutional Court; Supreme Court; High Court
- Chief judge: Chief Justice of Zimbabwe
- Seat: Supreme Court

Auditory branch
- Name: Office of the Auditor-General
- President: Auditor-General of Zimbabwe

The politics of Zimbabwe take place in a society deeply divided along lines of race, ethnicity, gender and geography. ZANU–PF has historically been the dominant force in Zimbabwean politics. The party, led by Robert Mugabe from 1980 until 2017, used the powers of the state to intimidate, imprison and otherwise constrain political opposition, while directing state funds and state media to advance party interests.

Under the Constitution of Zimbabwe (2013), Zimbabwe was a presidential republic in which the President serves as both head of state and head of government. Executive power is exercised by the government through the Cabinet. Legislative power is vested in both the government and Parliament. The political system has undergone major changes, including the 2017 military-assisted transition and constitutional amendments in 2026 that extended terms of office to seven years and provided for future presidents to be elected by Parliament rather than by direct popular vote.

Zimbabwe has experienced an economic crisis since the late 1990s, marked by hyperinflation, sanctions, and disputes over land reform and governance.

== History ==
=== Political developments since the Lancaster House Agreement ===
The initial post-independence Constitution derived from the Lancaster House Agreement of 1979 institutionalised majority rule while protecting minority rights. Successive amendments by the government have included:

- The abolition of seats reserved for whites in Parliament in 1987;
- The abolition of the office of Prime Minister in 1987 and the creation of an executive presidency (the office was briefly restored in 2009 before being abolished again in 2013);
- The abolition of the Senate in 1990 (reintroduced in 2005) and the creation of appointed seats in the House of Assembly.

ZANU–PF, under Robert Mugabe, won every election from independence on 18 April 1980 until it lost the parliamentary elections in March 2008 to the Movement for Democratic Change. Allegations of corruption, vote-rigging and intimidation have accompanied several elections, notably those of 1990 and 2002. Ethnic rivalry between the Shona and Ndebele has significantly shaped politics, contributing to the Gukurahundi conflict in Matabeleland in the 1980s. This led to the 1987 Unity Accord, the merger of ZAPU into ZANU–PF, and the appointment of Joshua Nkomo as Vice-President.

Factionalism within ZANU–PF increased in the mid-2000s amid uncertainty over Mugabe’s future. Secret meetings involving both ruling party and opposition figures were reported in 2005. In 2007 Mugabe carried out a major Cabinet reshuffle.

The disputed March 2008 parliamentary and presidential elections, in which ZANU–PF lost its majority amid widespread allegations of irregularities, violence and intimidation, led to Southern African Development Community (SADC)-mediated negotiations. These resulted in the formation of a Government of National Unity (GNU) in February 2009, with Mugabe remaining President and Morgan Tsvangirai of the MDC becoming Prime Minister. The GNU period (2009–2013) brought a degree of economic stabilisation through policies such as cash budgeting and dollarisation, although it was characterised by ongoing political tensions and policy disagreements between the partners.

A new Constitution was approved by referendum in March 2013 and came into effect later that year. It introduced provisions for devolution, an expanded bill of rights and a separate Constitutional Court. ZANU–PF and Mugabe won the subsequent July 2013 general elections.

In November 2017, amid intensifying factional struggles within ZANU–PF (particularly between the Lacoste and G40 factions), elements of the security forces intervened in what they described as "Operation Restore Legacy." Mugabe resigned on 21 November 2017 after 37 years in power. Emmerson Mnangagwa, who had been dismissed as Vice-President earlier that month, was sworn in as President on 24 November 2017.

Mnangagwa won the 2018 and 2023 presidential elections, with ZANU–PF retaining parliamentary majorities. Both elections were contested by the opposition, which alleged irregularities, while some international observers noted concerns over the electoral environment. Under Mnangagwa, ZANU–PF has continued to experience internal factionalism, and the government has been criticised for consolidating executive power through a series of constitutional amendments. These have included measures increasing presidential appointment powers and, in 2026, the enactment of further amendments that extended presidential and parliamentary terms from five to seven years and altered aspects of the presidential election process, with the changes extending the current terms until 2030. Critics have described the 2026 reforms as undermining key safeguards in the 2013 Constitution.

=== Political conditions ===
Since the defeat of the constitutional referendum in 2000, Zimbabwean politics has seen a departure from democratic norms, including free and fair elections, judicial independence, the rule of law, freedom from racial discrimination, and the existence of independent media, civil society and academia. Widespread human-rights violations have been documented. Elections have been characterised by political violence, intimidation and the politicisation of the judiciary, military, police force and public service. Senior government figures have described a state of Chimurenga (liberation war) against the opposition, particularly the Movement for Democratic Change – Tsvangirai (MDC-T). Independent newspapers have been closed, judges threatened or arrested, and repressive laws on speech, assembly and association selectively enforced. Opposition members have routinely faced arrest, harassment and, in some cases, torture or imprisonment. Court rulings favouring the opposition have frequently been ignored by security forces.

These patterns have persisted and, in some respects, evolved under subsequent administrations. Successive elections, including those of 2013, 2018 and 2023, have been marked by allegations of voter intimidation, politically motivated violence and the misuse of state resources and institutions in favour of the ruling ZANU–PF. International and regional observers have repeatedly noted concerns over the lack of a level playing field, with security forces and traditional leaders sometimes accused of mobilising support for the ruling party while restricting opposition activities.

Censorship and suppression of the press have remained prominent features of the political landscape. Independent newspapers and broadcasters have faced closure, regulatory harassment and economic pressure. Under the Mnangagwa administration, while overt violence against journalists has reportedly decreased compared with earlier periods, cases of intimidation, threats (including on social media), equipment confiscation and disproportionate use of police force continue to be documented. Self-censorship remains widespread among journalists seeking to avoid reprisals. High-profile cases have included the prolonged detention and prosecution of investigative journalist Hopewell Chin’ono and the arbitrary detention of other reporters, actions criticised by press-freedom organisations as assaults on freedom of expression.

Opposition parties have faced significant obstacles to effective campaigning. Beyond episodic violence and arrests, the ruling party has been accused of systematic efforts to undermine opposition structures. In the case of the Citizens Coalition for Change (CCC), former leader Nelson Chamisa publicly accused ZANU–PF of infiltrating and "hijacking" the party through state institutions, leading to his resignation from the CCC in January 2024 and the subsequent fragmentation of the party into rival factions. The CCC has at times boycotted parliamentary by-elections, citing the need for electoral reforms, while ZANU–PF secured additional seats in low-turnout contests. These dynamics have contributed to a broader perception of a weakened and divided opposition unable to mount sustained challenges.

The overall political environment has been characterised by the continued politicisation of state institutions and restrictions on dissent. Civil society organisations and human rights defenders have reported sustained pressure, including surveillance, arbitrary arrests and limitations on assembly. While the government has pointed to certain reforms and engagement with regional bodies, independent assessments have consistently highlighted the narrowing of democratic space, weak accountability mechanisms and the persistence of a patronage-based political system.

Despite periodic calls for national dialogue from civil society and regional actors, concerns over the erosion of judicial independence, media freedom and the ability of opposition voices to operate freely have remained prominent features of Zimbabwe’s political conditions into the mid-2020s.

== Government of Zimbabwe ==
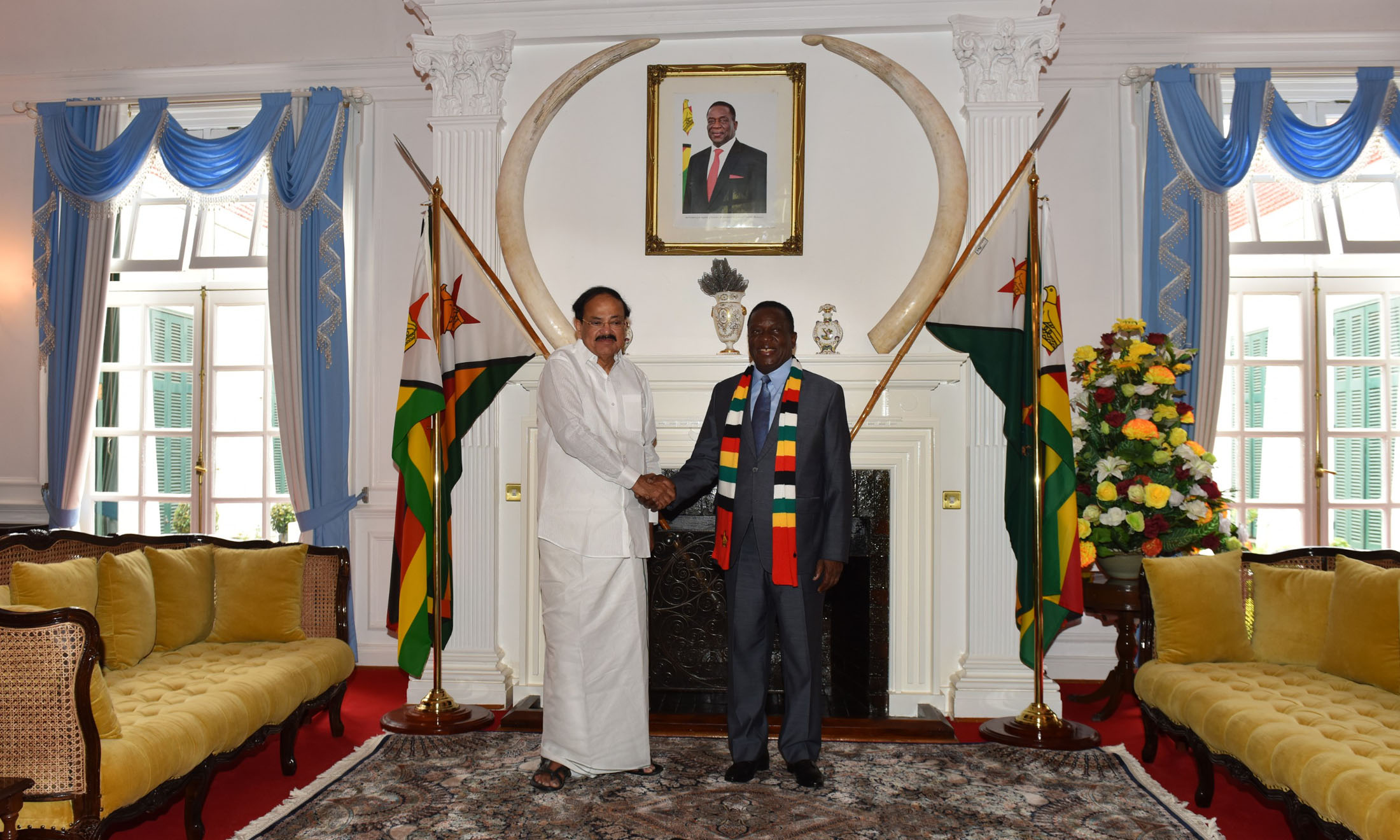
The President resides at State House, where he often receives international delegates.

Political power in Zimbabwe is split between three branches: the executive, the legislative and the judicial branches, with the President as the head of the executive branch, Parliament as the legislature and the Chief Justice of the Supreme Court of Zimbabwe as the head of the judicial branch.

=== Executive ===
The President is the head of state, head of government and Commander-in-Chief of the Defence Forces. Executive authority derives from the people and is exercised by the President through the Cabinet.

Presidential powers fall into several categories:

- Over the legislature: summon, adjourn or dissolve Parliament; appoint members of Parliament;
- Over the judiciary: appoint judges and other judicial officers;
- Over the executive: appoint Cabinet Ministers and senior administrative officers;
- Over security forces: command the Defence Forces and Police;
- Legislative: enact legislation (subject to parliamentary processes);
- Foreign affairs and security: declare war, make peace, conclude treaties;
- Miscellaneous: exercise the prerogative of mercy, confer honours, and grant pardons (published in the Gazette).

The President has historically been elected by popular vote for a term of five years. The 2026 amendments to the Constitution mean that in future the President will be elected by a joint session of Parliament for a term of seven years. The President is limited to two terms. The current President is Emmerson Mnangagwa (ZANU–PF), who assumed office on 24 November 2017.

The Cabinet is appointed by the President and is collectively responsible to the National Assembly.

=== Legislature ===
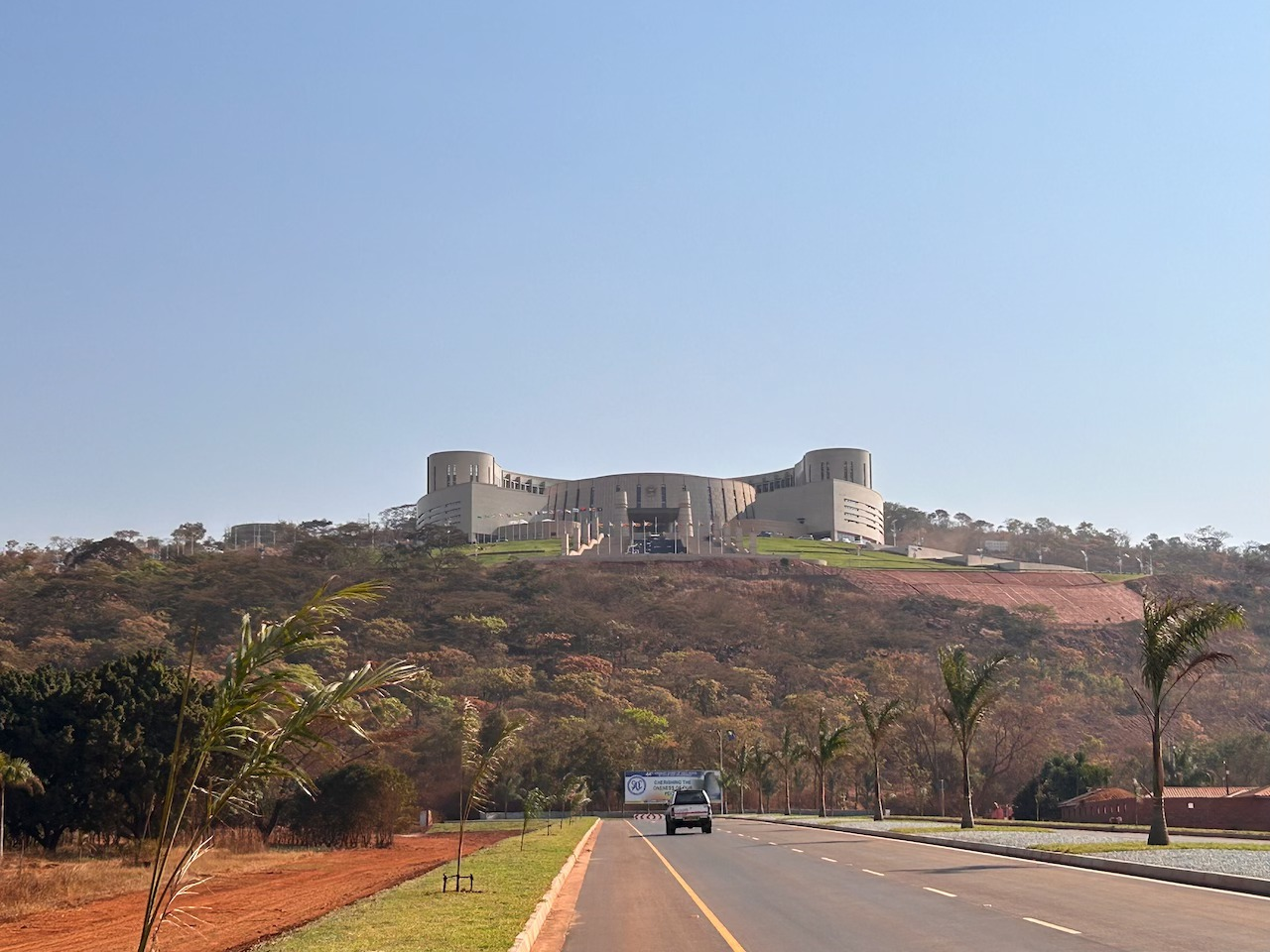
The New Parliament Building is the seat of the Legislature

Parliament is bicameral, consisting of the National Assembly and the Senate.

The National Assembly has 210 members elected from single-member constituencies by first-past-the-post, plus the Speaker. Under the 2013 Constitution, 60 additional women members and 10 additional youth members were elected by proportional representation. Members serve a maximum term of five years (extended to seven years by the 2026 amendments).

The Senate, reintroduced in 2005 after its abolition in 1990, has 80 members: 60 elected for five-year terms (six from each of the ten provinces by party-list proportional representation using the Hare quota, based on votes in the lower house election); two seats for each non-metropolitan district elected by provincial assemblies of chiefs using the single non-transferable vote; one seat each for the President and Deputy President of the National Council of Chiefs; and one male and one female seat for persons with disabilities elected by an electoral college designated by the National Disability Board.

Parliament enacts legislation, approves the budget and oversees the executive. The President may assent to Bills or refer them to the Constitutional Court.

=== Judiciary ===
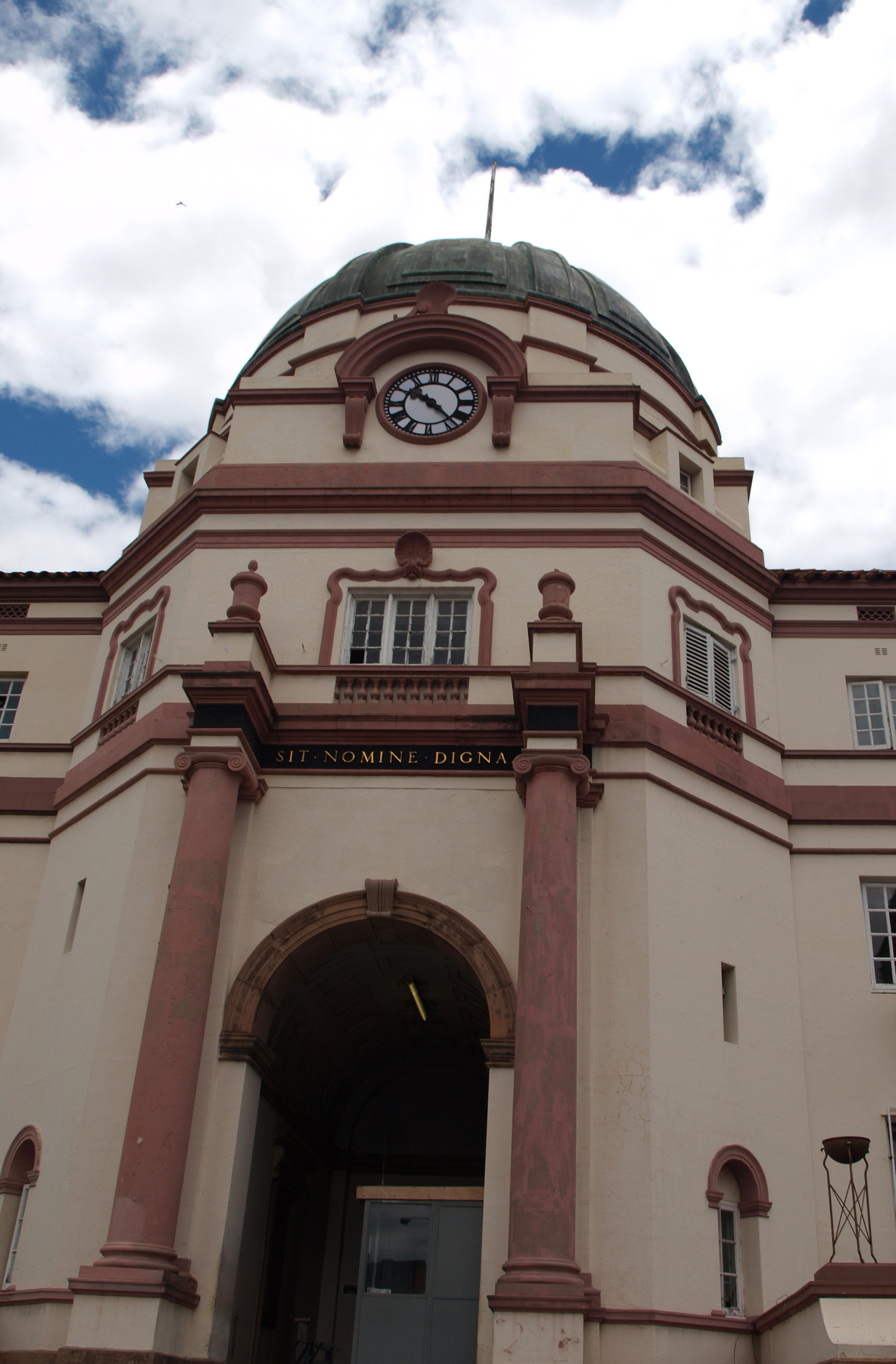
The High Court has seats in Harare and this one in Bulawayo.

The judiciary is headed by the Chief Justice of the Supreme Court, appointed by the President on the advice of the Judicial Service Commission. The Constitution contains an extensive Bill of Rights protecting fundamental freedoms.

The Supreme Court is the highest court of appeal in non-constitutional matters. The Constitutional Court serves as the final arbiter on constitutional matters. The legal system has faced challenges from politicisation and threats to judicial independence, with some rulings in favour of the opposition disregarded by security agencies.

== Political parties ==
ZANU–PF has dominated Zimbabwean politics since independence, winning every election until 2008 and retaining power thereafter through control of state institutions and significant advantages in access to state resources and media. The party originated from the liberation struggle as a merger of ZANU and elements of earlier nationalist movements and has combined nationalist, socialist and developmental rhetoric.

The main opposition, the Movement for Democratic Change (MDC), was formed in 1999 by a coalition of trade unions, civil society organisations and other groups opposed to the ruling party's policies and governance record. It mounted a significant challenge to ZANU–PF’s dominance, particularly after the 2000 constitutional referendum and in the 2008 elections, when it won a majority in the House of Assembly. The MDC later split into several factions amid internal disputes; its principal successor movements eventually coalesced around the Citizens Coalition for Change (CCC), led by Nelson Chamisa. Opposition parties have faced significant restrictions, including arrests, harassment, limited access to state media and, in some periods, violence during campaigning.

Earlier opposition parties that were once prominent but have since declined or been absorbed include the Zimbabwe African People's Union (ZAPU), which merged with ZANU–PF following the 1987 Unity Accord after years of conflict in Matabeleland. Other smaller or short-lived parties, such as the Forum Party in the 1990s, briefly challenged the ruling party but struggled to sustain national support.

Smaller parties and independent candidates continue to exist and contest elections, though they have generally had limited national impact. Registration of new political parties is governed by law and requires meeting criteria set by the Zimbabwe Electoral Commission; critics have argued that administrative and financial hurdles, combined with the advantages enjoyed by the incumbent, create an uneven playing field.

Factionalism has also occurred within ZANU–PF, particularly during periods of leadership transition. Notable examples include the intense internal rivalries in the mid-2010s that preceded the 2017 transition of power. Similar dynamics have continued under the current leadership, affecting party cohesion and succession planning.

In addition to direct repression, opposition parties have reported difficulties in maintaining organisational structures, securing funding, and accessing state-controlled media. The Citizens Coalition for Change has faced particular challenges, including public accusations by its former leader of infiltration by ruling-party elements through state institutions, which contributed to internal divisions and the resignation of Nelson Chamisa from the party in early 2024. These factors, alongside periodic violence and legal restrictions on assembly and expression during election periods, have constrained the ability of opposition parties to campaign effectively on a national scale.

== Elections ==
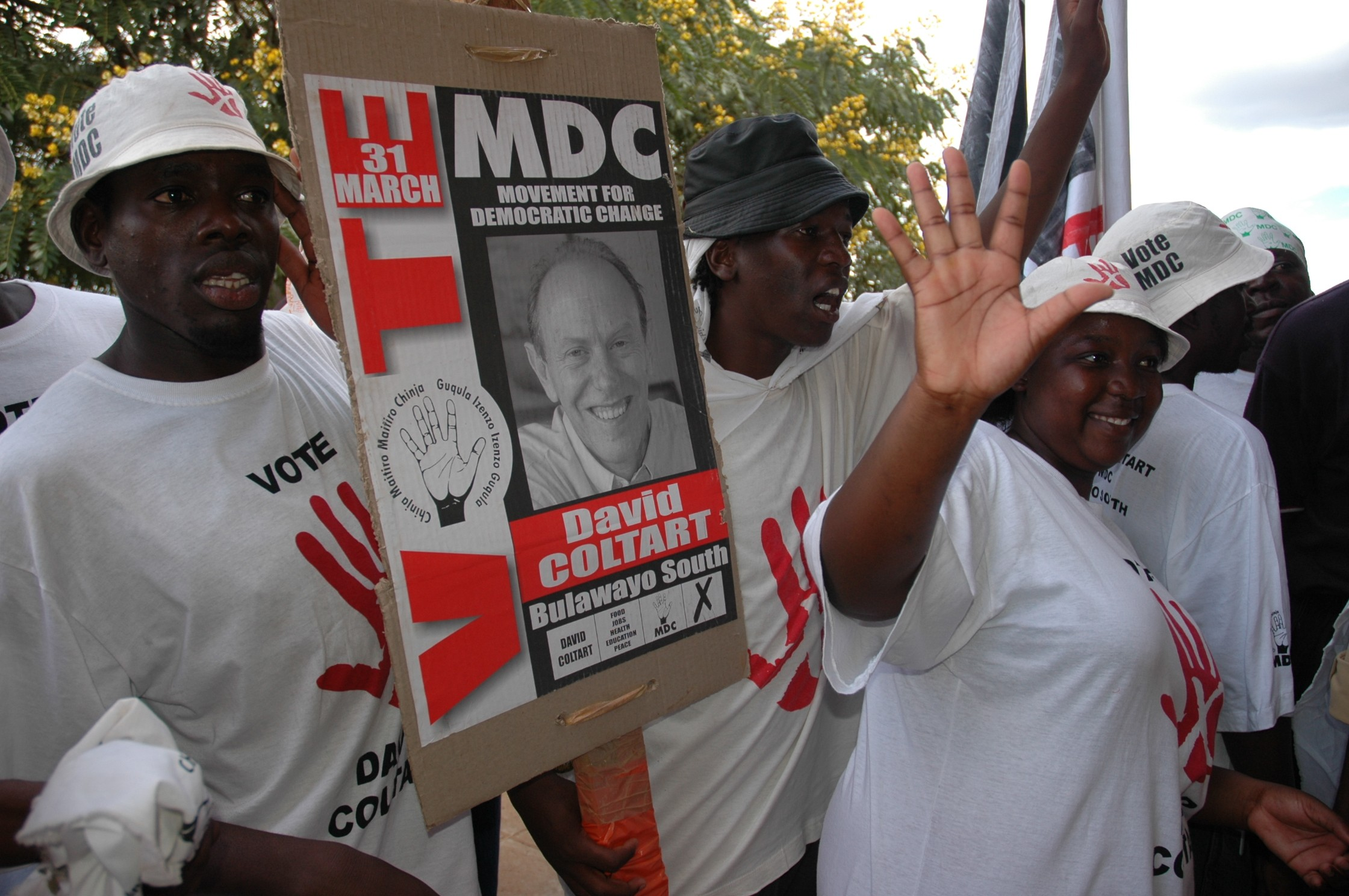
Opposition campaigners during the 2005 election.

Harmonised elections for the presidency, Parliament and local government are held every five years (seven years following the 2026 amendments). The system combines first-past-the-post for constituency seats with proportional representation for additional seats. The Zimbabwe Electoral Commission (ZEC) administers elections.

Presidential elections have been held in 2002, 2008, 2013, 2018 and 2023 amid recurring allegations of irregularities, intimidation and fraud from opposition parties and some observers. ZANU–PF retained power in all contests, though it lost its parliamentary majority in 2008. The 2026 constitutional amendment changed the method of electing future presidents to a vote by a joint sitting of Parliament.

Elections have frequently been characterised by political violence and intimidation, particularly in the pre- and post-election periods. Opposition supporters and candidates have reported harassment, arbitrary arrests and, in some cases, physical attacks by state security forces or ruling-party-aligned groups. State resources and traditional leaders have often been mobilised in favour of the incumbent, creating an uneven playing field. Smaller parties and independent candidates have faced additional barriers, including limited access to state media, difficulties in securing funding, and administrative hurdles in candidate registration and campaigning.

The main opposition has encountered particular challenges in maintaining organisational cohesion and mounting effective national campaigns. Successive opposition formations, including factions of the Movement for Democratic Change and its successor, the Citizens Coalition for Change (CCC), have reported infiltration by ruling-party elements through state institutions, internal divisions, and restrictions on public gatherings. In the wake of the 2023 elections, the CCC boycotted some parliamentary by-elections, citing the need for comprehensive electoral reforms. These dynamics have contributed to low voter turnout in certain contests and have limited the opposition’s ability to translate popular support into parliamentary seats.

International and regional observers have repeatedly raised concerns about the integrity of the electoral process. Reports from bodies such as the Southern African Development Community (SADC), the African Union, and independent monitoring groups have highlighted issues including delays in the release of results, discrepancies in voter rolls, and the selective application of electoral laws. While some observers have noted technical improvements in voting day logistics in certain elections, broader criticisms have focused on the lack of a genuinely level playing field and the politicisation of institutions responsible for electoral management and adjudication.

The Zimbabwe Electoral Commission has itself been subject to criticism regarding its independence and capacity. Opposition parties and civil society groups have called for reforms to strengthen its autonomy and transparency, including changes to its appointment processes and greater access for party agents and observers. Despite periodic dialogue initiatives, many of these concerns have remained unresolved into the mid-2020s.

== Devolution and local government ==
Chapter 14 of the 2013 Constitution provides for devolution to provincial and metropolitan councils and local authorities. The stated objectives include enhancing democratic participation by citizens and communities, preserving national unity, promoting equitable allocation of national resources, and ensuring efficient and responsive service delivery at the sub-national level. Ten provincial councils and two metropolitan councils (Harare and Bulawayo) are responsible for social and economic development planning, coordination of government functions within their areas, and the promotion of investment and tourism. Local authorities (urban councils and rural district councils) are tasked with managing local affairs, making by-laws, and collecting revenue.

Implementation of devolution has been uneven and incomplete. While the 2013 Constitution envisages significant transfer of powers and functions to sub-national levels, many pre-existing laws governing provincial administration and local government have not been substantially revised or repealed to align with Chapter 14. This legislative lag has left provincial and local structures operating under frameworks that retain substantial central control, limiting their autonomy in practice.

Academic analyses have identified several persistent obstacles. Fiscal decentralisation remains limited, with provincial and local authorities receiving inadequate and often delayed transfers from the central government, while major revenue sources continue to be controlled nationally. Capacity constraints at sub-national level — including shortages of skilled personnel, infrastructure, and technical expertise — have further hampered effective implementation. In addition, there have been documented tendencies toward recentralisation, with the national government retaining or reclaiming authority over key functions through the appointment of Ministers of State for Provincial Affairs and other central oversight mechanisms.

These challenges have been compounded by political dynamics. The ruling party's strong centralised structure and dominance at the national level have, according to several studies, contributed to resistance against meaningful power-sharing with sub-national entities, particularly in areas where opposition parties have historically performed well. While the government has introduced some policies and budget lines in support of devolution since 2017, independent assessments indicate that these measures have not yet translated into the comprehensive legal, fiscal, and institutional reforms required by the 2013 Constitution.

Overall, devolution in Zimbabwe remains partially implemented more than a decade after the adoption of the 2013 Constitution, with the gap between constitutional aspirations and practical reality continuing to draw attention from scholars and governance analysts.

== International relations ==
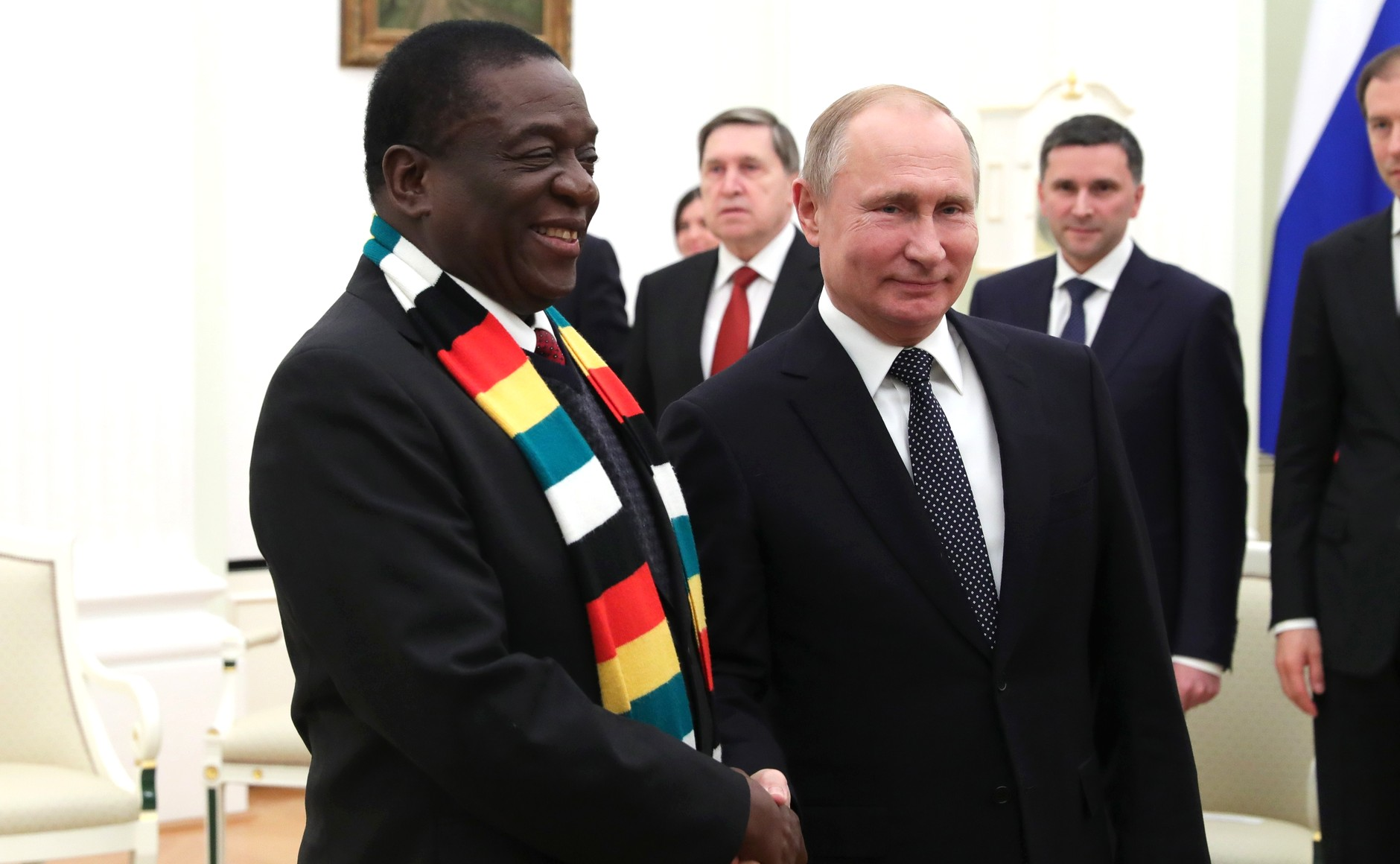
Zimbabwe has maintained a close relationship with Russia.

Zimbabwe is a member of the Southern African Development Community (SADC), the African Union (AU), the United Nations and the Non-Aligned Movement. It has pursued diplomatic and economic partnerships with a range of countries, including significant engagement with China. Relations with some Western governments have been strained over governance and human-rights concerns, leading to targeted sanctions. Regional bodies such as SADC have mediated political disputes, notably during the 2008–2009 crisis.

Zimbabwe has historically pursued a policy of active non-alignment, aligning itself with positions taken by the Non-Aligned Movement, the African Union (formerly the Organisation of African Unity), and the Group of 77 plus China. Within SADC, Zimbabwe has maintained close political and economic ties with neighbouring states, forged during the liberation struggle and the anti-apartheid era. SADC played a central mediating role in the post-2008 political crisis, facilitating the Government of National Unity (2009–2013). More recently, the SADC Election Observation Mission issued critical statements on aspects of the 2023 general elections that fell short of regional standards and Zimbabwe’s own constitutional and electoral requirements.

Zimbabwe is a founding or long-standing member of the African Union and participates actively in its structures, although AU statements on Zimbabwe's governance and electoral processes have at times reflected broader continental concerns about democratic standards. The country has also sought to strengthen ties with emerging economies. It has intensified efforts to join the BRICS grouping, initiating formal processes and engaging in negotiations regarding the BRICS New Development Bank, reflecting a broader strategy of diversifying partnerships beyond traditional Western engagement.

Relations with China have been particularly significant, encompassing infrastructure development, mining investments, loans, and diplomatic support. China has consistently advocated for the lifting of Western sanctions on Zimbabwe. Under President Emmerson Mnangagwa, Zimbabwe has pursued a policy of re-engagement with the international community, aiming to secure the removal of sanctions, attract investment, and advance its Vision 2030 development agenda. This has included outreach to Western governments and institutions, alongside the deepening of ties with non-Western partners such as Russia and other BRICS members.

Relations with Western governments, particularly the United States, the European Union, and the United Kingdom, have remained strained due to concerns over governance, human rights, and the rule of law. These concerns have resulted in targeted sanctions against individuals and entities, including measures under the US Zimbabwe Democracy and Economic Recovery Act (ZDERA) and, more recently, Global Magnitsky sanctions. While some targeted sanctions have been adjusted over time, broader restrictions have persisted, affecting economic engagement and access to international financial institutions.

Zimbabwe was suspended from the Commonwealth of Nations in 2002 and withdrew in 2003 amid disputes over land reform and electoral processes. Successive governments have expressed interest in rejoining, but full readmission has not occurred. The country continues to engage with Commonwealth mechanisms on a selective basis while prioritising other multilateral forums.

Overall, Zimbabwe's foreign policy under the Second Republic has emphasised economic diplomacy, regional solidarity within SADC and the AU, and a pragmatic diversification of partnerships, while navigating the legacy of strained relations with parts of the Western international community.

== See also ==
- Education in Zimbabwe
- Political history of Zimbabwe
- Politics of Rhodesia
- List of political parties in Zimbabwe
