= Zimbabwe Electoral Commission =

Election administrating body

Commission overview
- Preceding Commission: Electoral Supervisory Commission
- Jurisdiction: Government of Zimbabwe
- Headquarters: Mahachi Quantum Building, 1 Nelson Mandela Avenue, P. Bag 7782, Harare; 17°49′50.5″S 31°2′27.57″E
- Key documents: Constitution of Zimbabwe; Electoral Act (Updated to 2018)
- Website: www.zec.org.zw

The Zimbabwe Electoral Commission (ZEC) is an independent Chapter 12 institution established in terms of Section 238 of the Constitution of Zimbabwe. It is responsible for the management and administration of Zimbabwe's electoral processes. It was initially established by an Act of Parliament in 2004, with influence from its predecessor, the Electoral Supervisory Commission, as well as the Southern African Development Community.

ZEC oversees voter registration, the conduct of elections and referendums, and related processes to ensure they are conducted freely, fairly, transparently, and in accordance with the law. It has faced ongoing criticism regarding its independence and performance, particularly during the 2008 elections.

== History ==
Prior to ZEC, electoral management was handled by the Electoral Supervisory Commission (ESC). The creation of ZEC in 2005 was intended to establish a more independent and professional body. The 2013 Constitution further strengthened its status as a Chapter 12 independent commission, outlining its mandate and protections.

ZEC has overseen all national elections since its inception, including the highly contentious 2008 harmonised elections.

== Functions ==
The official functions of the Zimbabwe Electoral Commission, as outlined in the Constitution and the Electoral Act, are:

- Preparing for, conducting, and supervising all elections and referendums.
- Ensuring that elections are free, fair, transparent, and conducted in accordance with the law.
- Directing and controlling voter registration.
- Compiling and maintaining the voters’ roll and registers.
- Designing, printing, and distributing ballot papers, setting up polling stations, and establishing ballot boxes.
- Conducting voter education and information campaigns that are accurate, adequate, and not biased toward any political party or candidate.
- Keeping the public informed about candidates, political parties, voting procedures, results, and the work of the commission.
- Exercising any other functions imposed by Acts of Parliament.

ZEC is also responsible for delimitation of constituencies and wards, a key function that involves redrawing electoral boundaries based on population and other criteria. This process has been a frequent point of contention regarding fairness and transparency.

== Structure and composition ==
The commission comprises a chairperson and commissioners appointed in accordance with constitutional procedures designed to promote independence. The commission has a secretariat headed by a Chief Elections Officer and includes various departments for voter registration, operations, legal affairs, and public education.

The Constitution requires that the commission operate independently and without fear, favour, or prejudice. Commissioners are appointed by the President on the recommendation of the Judicial Service Commission or other mechanisms intended to ensure impartiality.

| Hon Justice Priscilla Chigumba | Chairperson |
| Rodney Kiwa | Deputy Chairperson |
| Utloile Silaigwana | Chief Elections Officer |
| Faith Sebata | Commissioner |
| Joyce Kazembe | Commissioner |
| Ngoni Kundidzora | Commissioner |
| Daniel Chigaru | Commissioner |
| Netsai Mushonga | Commissioner |
| Sibongile Ndlovu | Commissioner |
| Qhubani Moyo | Commissioner |

== Relationship with Parliament ==
ZEC is constitutionally independent but accountable to Parliament. It submits reports on its operations and election outcomes to Parliament, and its work is subject to oversight by the relevant parliamentary committee. The commission may also appear before parliamentary committees to answer questions on its performance and proposed reforms. This relationship is intended to balance independence with democratic accountability.

== Controversies ==
ZEC has faced significant criticism regarding its independence, capacity, and performance. Opposition parties and international observers have frequently questioned its ability to deliver credible elections.

=== 2008 elections ===
The 2008 harmonised elections were particularly controversial. Reports documented serious flaws, including delays in the release of results, discrepancies in the voters’ roll, restricted access for observers, and allegations of bias toward the ruling party. Human Rights Watch and other organisations highlighted the erosion of public confidence in ZEC’s performance amid widespread political violence and intimidation.

Morgan Tsvangirai of the Movement for Democratic Change - Tsvangirai claimed that the elections could not be fair due to state-sponsored violence and that members of the security forces were being coerced to vote for ZANU-PF. Critics also accused ZEC of failing to adequately regulate state media, such as the state-run Herald, which was accused of bias and inciting hatred against the opposition.

=== Recent reforms ===
The Constitutional Amendment No. 3 Act, passed in 2026, introduces significant changes affecting ZEC's mandate. Key provisions include transferring voter registration from ZEC to the Registrar-General's Office and establishing a new Electoral Delimitation Commission to take over the responsibility of drawing electoral boundaries. These changes have raised concerns among opposition parties and civil society about further weakening ZEC’s role and independence.

== See also ==
- International reaction to the 2008 Zimbabwean presidential election
- 2008 Zimbabwe presidential election
- Campaigning for Zimbabwean presidential election, 2008
- Second round of voting in the 2008 Zimbabwean presidential election
