= Unity Accord =

1987 political agreement merging ZANU-PF and ZAPU in Zimbabwe

Agreement between ZANU (PF) and PF-ZAPU on National Unity
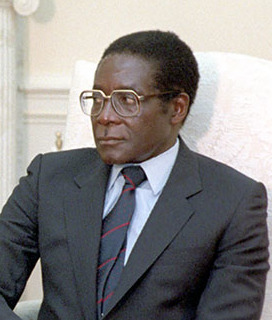
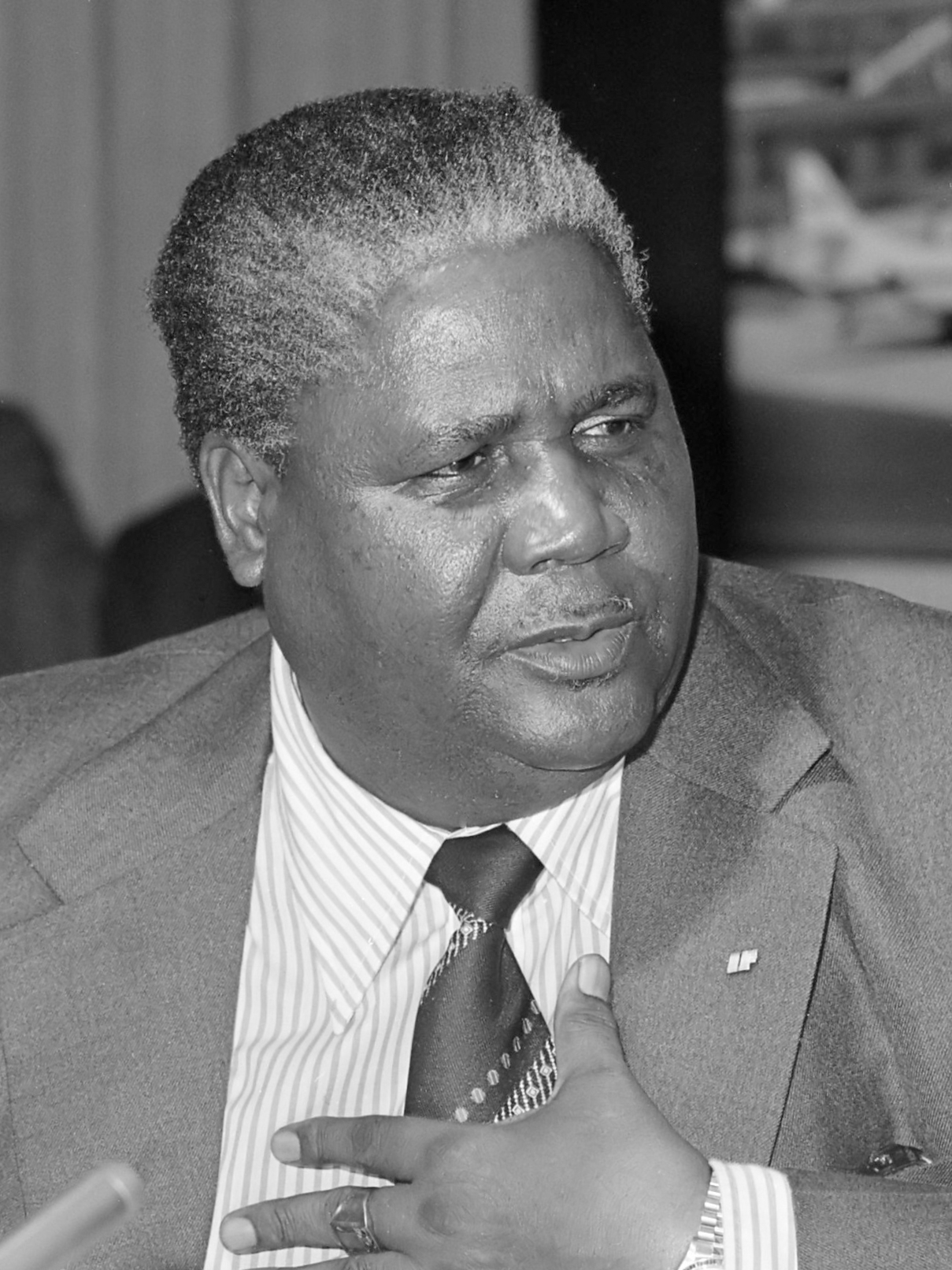
- Mugabe (left) and Nkomo (right)
- Type: Political merger agreement
- Context: Gukurahundi
- Drafted: 2 October 1985 – 10 December 1987
- Signed: December 22, 1987
- Location: State House, Harare, Zimbabwe
- Ratified: 1988 (by respective party congresses)
- Effective: 22 December 1987
- Condition: Immediate implementation upon signing; formal merger ratified by party congresses in 1988
- Mediators: None (direct bilateral negotiations)
- Negotiators: Robert Mugabe (ZANU-PF); Joshua Nkomo (PF-ZAPU); Equal sub-committee members from both parties
- Original signatories: Robert Mugabe; Joshua Nkomo
- Signatories: Robert Mugabe (ZANU-PF); Joshua Nkomo (PF-ZAPU)
- Parties: ZANU (PF); PF-ZAPU
- Ratifiers: ZANU (PF) and PF-ZAPU party congresses (1988)
- Language: English
- The agreement merged ZANU (PF) and PF-ZAPU into a single party, ZANU-PF. A blanket amnesty for dissidents was granted concurrently.

The Unity Accord was a landmark political agreement signed on 22 December 1987 between Robert Mugabe, leader of the Zimbabwe African National Union – Patriotic Front (ZANU-PF), and Joshua Nkomo, leader of the Zimbabwe African People's Union (ZAPU or PF-ZAPU). It merged the two major nationalist parties into a single ZANU-PF and brought an end to the Gukurahundi conflict (1982–1987) in Matabeleland and parts of the Midlands provinces.

The Accord is viewed by supporters, including successive ZANU-PF administrations, as the cornerstone of national unity, stability and post-independence development. Critics, including scholars and victims’ groups, describe it as an elite-driven “peace without reconciliation” that ended overt violence through a blanket amnesty but failed to deliver truth, justice, reparations or meaningful healing for the estimated 20,000 victims of state-sponsored atrocities.

== Background ==
=== Post-independence political tensions (1980–1982) ===
Zimbabwe attained independence on 18 April 1980. In the preceding elections ZANU-PF, under Mugabe, won a clear majority while ZAPU, under Nkomo, secured strong support in Matabeleland. Although the two parties had cooperated under the Patriotic Front during the liberation war, they contested the 1980 elections separately. Deep-seated rivalries between their guerrilla armies — ZANLA (primarily Shona-speaking) and ZIPRA (with significant Ndebele recruitment) — carried over into the post-independence period.

Tensions escalated after independence. Allegations of arms caches linked to ZAPU, the demotion of Nkomo from Minister of Home Affairs, and sporadic “dissident” activity by former ZIPRA fighters created a climate of mutual suspicion. The government portrayed the insecurity as externally backed banditry; ZAPU supporters saw it as politically motivated marginalisation.

=== Gukurahundi (1983–1987) ===
In January 1983 the government deployed the North Korean-trained Fifth Brigade to Matabeleland North under the code-name Gukurahundi (“the early rain that washes away the chaff”). The operation targeted alleged dissidents, ZIPRA veterans and civilians, predominantly in Ndebele-speaking areas. It involved mass killings, torture, rape, arbitrary detention, destruction of villages and food embargoes.

The most authoritative contemporary documentation is the 1997 report Breaking the Silence, Building True Peace by the Catholic Commission for Justice and Peace in Zimbabwe (CCJPZ) and the Legal Resources Foundation (LRF). Based on more than 1,000 interviews and forensic evidence, the report confirmed a minimum of approximately 2,000–2,750 deaths in documented cases, while noting that the true figure was likely substantially higher. A broad scholarly and international consensus, including statements by the International Association of Genocide Scholars, commonly cites a conservative estimate of more than 20,000 deaths.

The violence peaked in 1983–1984 and continued at lower intensity until the signing of the Accord. While dissidents also committed atrocities, the scale and systematic nature of Fifth Brigade operations dominated contemporary and subsequent accounts.

== Negotiations and signing ==
Formal unity talks between ZANU-PF and PF-ZAPU commenced in October 1985 and continued through ten meetings until December 1987. The process was driven by the shared desire to end the Matabeleland conflict, consolidate nationalist unity and pursue long-term political objectives, including, for some leaders, the creation of a one-party state.

The Accord was signed on 22 December 1987 at State House, Harare, by Mugabe and Nkomo.

== Provisions of the Accord ==
The full text of the agreement, published by The Herald, contains a detailed preamble referencing the parties’ shared liberation history and the need to eliminate insecurity in Matabeleland. It then sets out ten substantive points:

1. ZANU (PF) and PF-ZAPU have irrevocably committed themselves to unite under one political party.
2. The unity of the two political parties shall be achieved under the name Zimbabwe African National Union (Patriotic Front), in short ZANU-PF.
3. Cde Robert Mugabe shall be the First Secretary and President of ZANU-PF.
4. ZANU-PF shall have two Second Secretaries and Vice-Presidents who shall be appointed by the First Secretary and President of the Party.
5. ZANU-PF shall seek to establish a socialist society in Zimbabwe on the guidance of Marxist-Leninist principles.
6. ZANU-PF shall seek to establish a One-Party State in Zimbabwe.
7. The leadership of ZANU-PF shall abide by the Leadership Code.
8. The existing structures of ZANU-PF and PF-ZAPU shall be merged in accordance with the letter and spirit of this Agreement.
9. Both parties shall, in the interim, take immediate, vigorous steps to eliminate and end insecurity and violence prevalent in Matabeleland.
10. ZANU-PF and PF-ZAPU shall convene their respective Congresses to give effect to this Agreement within the shortest possible time.

An interim clause vested Mugabe with full powers to prepare for implementation. A blanket amnesty for dissidents was announced concurrently.

== Aftermath and implementation ==
The Accord ended large-scale armed conflict. Many dissidents surrendered under the amnesty. ZAPU structures were integrated into ZANU-PF; Nkomo was appointed one of two Vice-Presidents. Constitutional amendments later in December 1987 created an executive presidency, which Mugabe assumed. Party congresses in 1988 formally ratified the merger.

ZANU-PF achieved overwhelming electoral dominance until the emergence of the Movement for Democratic Change (MDC) at the end of the 1990s. In Matabeleland, resentment over unaddressed Gukurahundi grievances contributed to strong opposition support from 2000 onwards.

== Political implications ==
The Accord significantly strengthened Mugabe’s personal authority and ZANU-PF’s hegemony, moving Zimbabwe closer to a de facto one-party state (although formal multiparty elections continued). It neutralised the principal organised challenge to ZANU-PF from within the liberation movement.

Scholars have criticised the Accord as an elitist settlement that prioritised power-sharing between leaders over broad democratic consensus or grassroots reconciliation. Ethnic and regional cleavages persisted, with many in Matabeleland perceiving continued political and economic marginalisation. The failure to address Gukurahundi legacies is widely seen as contributing to later political alienation and the rise of opposition parties in the region.

Under President Emmerson Mnangagwa’s “Second Republic”, the Accord has been officially reframed as a foundational pillar of inclusive nation-building. Annual Unity Day commemorations (22 December) emphasise its role in securing peace and development.

== National healing and reconciliation efforts ==
The Accord contained no provisions for truth-telling, victim recognition, compensation, exhumations or accountability. A culture of official silence surrounded Gukurahundi for many years.

Later initiatives included:

- The Organ for National Healing, Reconciliation and Integration (ONHRI) established under the 2008 Global Political Agreement.
- The National Peace and Reconciliation Commission (NPRC), created by the 2013 Constitution and operationalised around 2018.

Under Mnangagwa, the government has encouraged more open discussion. The NPRC has identified Gukurahundi as a priority. Public hearings on Gukurahundi-related issues commenced in Matabeleland provinces in June 2025, adopting a victim-centred approach involving traditional leaders. The commission has produced annual reports, conducted community dialogues and studied post-conflict models such as Rwanda’s.

Progress has been criticised as slow. Observers point to limited resources, the absence of prosecutions or comprehensive reparations, insufficient memorialisation and questions over the commission’s independence and mandate (which faced renewal issues by 2026). Victims’ groups continue to demand official acknowledgment, forensic exhumations, compensation and curriculum inclusion of the history.

== Legacy and reflections ==
Supporters regard the Unity Accord as a statesmanlike achievement by Mugabe and Nkomo that ended conflict and laid the basis for national stability. Critics, including Mashingaidze and many in affected communities, view it as a minimalist pact that delivered negative peace (cessation of hostilities) but deferred genuine reconciliation. The Accord continues to shape Zimbabwean politics: it underpins ZANU-PF’s narrative of itself as the sole legitimate unifier, while unresolved grievances influence identity politics, opposition support and ongoing transitional-justice debates.

Full national healing remains unfinished business more than three decades after the signing.

== See also ==
- Gukurahundi
- Zimbabwe African National Union – Patriotic Front
- Joshua Nkomo
- Robert Mugabe
- National Peace and Reconciliation Commission (Zimbabwe)
- Politics of Zimbabwe
