= Zimbabwe Human Rights Commission =

Independent constitutional commission

Independent constitutional commission overview
- Formed: 2013
- Jurisdiction: Zimbabwe
- Headquarters: Harare, Zimbabwe
- Independent constitutional commission executive: Jessie Majome, Chairperson
- Website: zhrc.org.zw

The Zimbabwe Human Rights Commission (ZHRC) is an independent constitutional commission in Zimbabwe established under Chapter 12 of the Constitution of Zimbabwe to promote, protect and enforce human rights. It is one of the independent commissions established to support democracy and is also mandated to protect the public against abuse of power and promote administrative justice.

In 2026, the Constitution of Zimbabwe Amendment (No. 3) Bill proposed transferring the functions of the Zimbabwe Gender Commission and the National Peace and Reconciliation Commission to the ZHRC. The proposed transfer of functions was removed from the Bill before its final passage through Parliament.

== History ==
The Zimbabwe Human Rights Commission was created by the 2013 Constitution as part of a new framework of independent institutions designed to support democracy and protect fundamental rights and freedoms. It replaced and expanded upon the earlier Human Rights Commission that had operated under the previous constitutional order. The ZHRC is established as Zimbabwe’s National Human Rights Institution in accordance with the Paris Principles.

== Mandate and functions ==
The overall mandate of the Zimbabwe Human Rights Commission is to protect, promote and enforce human rights and freedoms. Its key functions include:

- Investigating complaints of human rights violations.
- Protecting the public from abuse of power by state and non-state actors.
- Promoting awareness of human rights through education and advocacy.
- Monitoring the human rights situation in Zimbabwe and reporting on compliance with international human rights obligations.
- Promoting administrative justice and good governance.
- Making recommendations to government and Parliament on measures to improve human rights protection.

== Activities ==
The Zimbabwe Human Rights Commission carries out a wide range of practical activities in fulfilment of its mandate. It regularly receives and investigates complaints from members of the public alleging violations of human rights and administrative injustice, providing redress where possible or making recommendations to relevant authorities.

The Commission has conducted human rights training programmes for state institutions, including training for recruit and serving correctional officers on human rights standards in places of detention. It has also engaged in public education and awareness campaigns on fundamental rights and freedoms.

A notable area of activity in 2026 was the Commission’s monitoring of the public consultation process on the Constitution of Zimbabwe Amendment (No. 3) Bill. The ZHRC publicly criticised aspects of the hearings, describing them as falling short of constitutional requirements for meaningful public participation, and issued a detailed legal analysis of the Bill. The Commission has also produced annual reports documenting its activities, complaints received, and recommendations made to government.

== 2026 constitutional amendment controversy ==
The Constitution of Zimbabwe Amendment (No. 3) Bill, 2026 proposed significant changes to several constitutional commissions. It included provisions to repeal the standalone Zimbabwe Gender Commission and the National Peace and Reconciliation Commission, with their functions to be transferred to the Zimbabwe Human Rights Commission.

The ZHRC conducted its own legal analysis of the Bill and publicly commented on aspects of the proposed amendments, including concerns about the public consultation process. Following the Commission’s public statements, its Chairperson, Jessie Majome, faced reported pressure and was later reassigned from her position.
