= CAB3 =

CAB3 may refer to

- Bedwell Harbour Water Aerodrome, located in Bedwell Harbour, British Columbia, Canada
- Constitution Amendment Bill No. 3, an amendment to the Constitution of Zimbabwe, now an Act
