= Auditor-General of Zimbabwe =

(in other official languages)
Northern Ndebele	U-oditha-Jikelele
Shona	Muongorori Mukuru Wezvemari Munyika
- Incumbent; Vimbai Chikwenhere since 18 May 2026
- Office of the Auditor-General
- Reports to: Independent and subject only to the law
- Seat: 5th Floor, Pax House, 89 Kwame Nkrumah Avene, Harare
- Appointer: President of Zimbabwe with the approval of Parliament
- Term length: Not more than six years, maximum total service of twelve years whether continuous or not
- Constituting instrument: Constitution of Zimbabwe
- Precursor: Supreme Audit Institution of Rhodesia
- Formation: 18 April 1980 (as Office of the Comptroller and Auditor-General)
- Website: auditorgeneral.gov.zw

The Auditor-General of Zimbabwe is the head of the Office of the Auditor-General, an independent constitutional office responsible for auditing the accounts, financial systems, and financial management of all government departments, institutions, agencies, provincial and metropolitan councils, and local authorities. The position plays a central role in promoting transparency, accountability, and the proper use of public funds in Zimbabwe.

The Auditor-General is appointed by the President with the approval of Parliament and must be a Zimbabwean citizen of integrity who has been qualified to practise as an auditor for at least ten years. The office operates independently, subject only to the law, and the Auditor-General's remuneration is charged on the Consolidated Revenue Fund and cannot be reduced during tenure.

== Role and functions ==
The primary functions of the Auditor-General, as set out in the Constitution, are:

- To audit the accounts, financial systems, and financial management of all departments, institutions, and agencies of government, all provincial and metropolitan councils, and all local authorities;
- At the request of the Government, to carry out special audits of the accounts of any statutory body or government-controlled entity;
- To order the taking of measures to rectify any defects in the management and safeguarding of public funds and public property; and
- To exercise any other functions conferred or imposed by or under an Act of Parliament.

Public officers must comply with orders given by the Auditor-General to rectify defects. The office also produces annual reports on appropriation accounts, finance and revenue statements, and fund accounts, which are submitted to Parliament for scrutiny.

The Auditor-General is supported by staff appointed through a board established by an Act of Parliament, with requirements for qualifications, conditions of service, and the independence and impartiality of those assisting the office.

== History ==
The office of the Auditor-General traces its origins to the colonial administration of Southern Rhodesia. The earliest reference to the audit of public moneys appeared in the Southern Rhodesia Order in Council of 1898, which required a full annual audit of accounts relating to revenue and expenditure connected with the administration of the territory. In 1915, a further Order in Council provided for the appointment — by the Secretary of State — of the first Auditor-General of Southern Rhodesia, establishing the office's independence and conferring powers to examine administrative revenue and expenditure.

Following the granting of self-governing status in 1923, the Audit and Exchequer Act of 1924 formalised the Auditor-General's independence, with appointment and dismissal by the Governor in Council, and required the office to report to Parliament. Between 1924 and 1947, all Auditors-General were military officers. A new Audit and Exchequer Act in 1948 introduced the title Controller and Auditor-General (later styled Comptroller and Auditor-General), effective from 1949.

In 1953, with the formation of the Federation of Rhodesia and Nyasaland, the office assumed responsibility for auditing the Federation as well as the territorial legislatures. On 1 January 1964, the audit office reverted to being the Supreme Audit Institution of Rhodesia. The unilateral declaration of independence in 1965 brought no major structural disruption, although the title was adjusted to Comptroller and Auditor-General to reflect the function of authorising issues from the Exchequer Account.

The office remained an all-white employing organisation until October 1978, when the first black officers were recruited. In 1979, the appointment, functions, and powers of the Comptroller and Auditor-General were incorporated into the Zimbabwe-Rhodesia Constitution for the first time.

Following independence in 1980, there were no major structural changes to the audit arrangements. Mr J. A. Dean, the last Comptroller and Auditor-General of the pre-independence period, continued in office until 1981. He was succeeded by Mr J. A. K. Prowse (1981–1983) and Mr J. N. Hilligan (from 1983). In 1987, Mr A. E. Harid became the first black Comptroller and Auditor-General, serving until 2004. Mrs Mildred Chiri was appointed in 2004 as the first black female holder of the office and served for approximately 19 years until her retirement around 2023.

Post-independence legislative developments strengthened the office's role. Amendments to the Audit and Exchequer Act in 1989 introduced value-for-money audits, while 1993 amendments extended the Auditor-General's authority to designated corporate bodies. The Audit Office Act of 2011 granted the office greater autonomy. The 2013 Constitution further reinforced the office’s independence, appointment process, tenure limits, and core functions, provisions that remain in force today.

== Appointment and tenure ==
The Auditor-General is appointed by the President with the approval of Parliament. Candidates must be Zimbabwean citizens chosen for integrity and qualified to practise as an auditor for at least ten years.

The term of office is not more than six years, and no person may be appointed after having served (continuously or otherwise) for a total of twelve years. Before taking office, the Auditor-General must take the oaths of loyalty and office before the President or an authorised person.

Remuneration and benefits are fixed by an Act of Parliament with the approval of the President on the recommendation of the Minister responsible for finance. This remuneration is charged on the Consolidated Revenue Fund and may not be reduced during the Auditor-General's tenure.

== Independence and accountability ==
In the exercise of functions, the Auditor-General is independent and subject only to the law. This constitutional guarantee is reinforced by security of tenure and protections against arbitrary removal or reduction in remuneration.

The Auditor-General reports through annual audit reports on government accounts, which are presented to Parliament for oversight by the relevant parliamentary committee (typically the Public Accounts Committee). These reports play a key role in holding the executive accountable for the use of public resources.

== Removal from office ==
The Auditor-General may be removed from office only for inability to perform functions due to mental or physical incapacity, gross incompetence, or gross misconduct. If the Minister responsible for finance, with the concurrence of the parliamentary committee responsible for public accounts, informs the President that removal should be investigated, the President must appoint a tribunal to inquire into the matter.

The tribunal must consist of at least three members, including at least one who has served as a judge and at least one chosen from a panel nominated by the institute or association representing public auditors in Zimbabwe. The tribunal inquires into the matter and reports its findings and recommendation to the President, who may then remove the Auditor-General by order under the public seal if recommended.

== List of Auditor-Generals ==
A complete historical list of officeholders is maintained in official records of the Office of the Auditor-General and parliamentary proceedings. Notable holders in the modern era include:

- Mildred Chiri (appointed 2004; served approximately 19 years until around 2023). She was the first woman to hold the position in recent decades and oversaw extensive public sector audits during her long tenure.
- Vimbai Chikwenhere (appointed May 2026; incumbent). Parliament approved her appointment following recommendation by the President.

Earlier officeholders served under the previous constitutional framework when the office was styled Comptroller and Auditor-General. Detailed records of pre-2004 holders are available through government archives and historical parliamentary documents.

== See also ==
- Government of Zimbabwe
- Constitution of Zimbabwe
