= Office of the Auditor-General (Zimbabwe) =

Office of the Auditor-General of Zimbabwe

Supreme audit institution overview
- Formed: 1 April 2011 (as autonomous statutory office); Origins in colonial period (at least 1898)
- Preceding Supreme audit institution: Office of the Comptroller and Auditor-General (pre-2011)
- Jurisdiction: Zimbabwe
- Headquarters: 5th Floor, Pax House, 89 Kwame Nkrumah Avene, Harare
- Supreme audit institution executive: Vimbai Chikwenhere, Auditor-General
- Parent Supreme audit institution: Independent constitutional office
- Website: auditorgeneral.gov.zw

The Office of the Auditor-General of Zimbabwe is the supreme audit institution of Zimbabwe. It supports the constitutional functions of the Auditor-General by carrying out audits of public accounts, financial systems, and the management of public funds across government departments, provincial and metropolitan councils, local authorities, and other public entities.

The office operates with statutory autonomy under the Audit Office Act (Chapter 22:18), which came into operation on 1 April 2011. It is headed by the Auditor-General, who is appointed under the Constitution.

== Overview ==
The Office of the Auditor-General assists the Auditor-General in fulfilling the mandate set out in Section 309 of the 2013 Constitution. Its work focuses on promoting accountability, transparency, and the efficient use of public resources through financial audits, compliance audits, and value-for-money audits. The office produces annual reports on government accounts that are submitted to Parliament for scrutiny by the Public Accounts Committee.

== History ==
The office traces its origins to the colonial administration of Southern Rhodesia. The first reference to the audit of public moneys appeared in the Southern Rhodesia Order in Council of 1898. In 1915, provision was made for the appointment of the first Auditor-General of Southern Rhodesia, establishing the office’s independence and audit powers.

Following self-government in 1923, the Audit and Exchequer Act of 1924 strengthened the office’s independence and reporting obligations to Parliament. The title was later changed to Comptroller and Auditor-General. During the Federation of Rhodesia and Nyasaland (1953–1963), the office audited both federal and territorial accounts. On 1 January 1964 it reverted to the Supreme Audit Institution of Rhodesia, continuing through the unilateral declaration of independence period with only minor adjustments to its title and functions.

After independence in 1980, the office retained institutional continuity. Successive holders served under the title Comptroller and Auditor-General until the early 2000s. Significant legislative reform occurred with the Audit Office Act of 2011, which granted the office greater autonomy as a statutory body. The 2013 Constitution further entrenched the independence and functions of the Auditor-General while preserving the office’s supporting role.

== Legal framework and independence ==
The core functions of the Auditor-General are set out in the 2013 Constitution. The structure and autonomy of the supporting office are governed by the Audit Office Act (Chapter 22:18). The Act establishes the office as a body corporate and provides for the appointment of staff through a board, with emphasis on qualifications, independence, impartiality, and integrity.

The Auditor-General exercises functions independently and is subject only to the law. Remuneration is charged on the Consolidated Revenue Fund and may not be reduced during tenure. These protections are designed to safeguard the office’s ability to report objectively on the use of public resources.

== Functions ==
Under the Constitution, the Auditor-General (supported by the office) is required to:

- Audit the accounts, financial systems and financial management of government departments, institutions, agencies, provincial and metropolitan councils, and local authorities;
- Carry out special audits of statutory bodies or government-controlled entities when requested by the Government;
- Order measures to rectify defects in the management and safeguarding of public funds and property; and
- Perform any other functions conferred by an Act of Parliament.

The office also conducts value-for-money audits focusing on economy, efficiency, and effectiveness, and has authority to audit designated corporate bodies.

== Structure and staff ==
The office consists of the Auditor-General and staff appointed under the provisions of the Audit Office Act. A board is responsible for the employment, conditions of service, and discipline of staff, with requirements to maintain the independence and integrity of the institution. The office is organised to support the full range of audit work across central government, devolved structures, and public entities.

== Reports and accountability ==
The office produces annual audit reports on appropriation accounts, finance and revenue statements, and fund accounts. These reports are submitted to Parliament and form the basis for oversight by the Public Accounts Committee. The office may also produce special reports on specific audits or matters of public interest.

== See also ==
- Supreme audit institution
- Government of Zimbabwe
