= National Peace and Reconciliation Commission =

Zimbabwean constitutional commission

Independent constitutional commission overview
- Formed: 2013 (established by the Constitution of Zimbabwe); Operationalised 5 January 2018
- Jurisdiction: Zimbabwe
- Headquarters: Harare, Zimbabwe
- Independent constitutional commission executive: Chairperson
- Website: www.nprc.org.zw

The National Peace and Reconciliation Commission (NPRC) is an independent constitutional commission in Zimbabwe established to promote national healing, post-conflict justice, reconciliation and sustainable peace. It was created under sections 251 to 253 of the Constitution of Zimbabwe (2013) as one of the independent commissions supporting democracy in Chapter 12. The Commission was operationalised by the National Peace and Reconciliation Commission Act [Chapter 10:32], signed into law by President Emmerson Mnangagwa on 5 January 2018. In 2026, the Constitution of Zimbabwe Amendment (No. 3) Bill proposed repealing the Commission and transferring its functions to the Zimbabwe Human Rights Commission, but this provision was removed during the parliamentary process and the NPRC was retained.

== Establishment ==
The National Peace and Reconciliation Commission was provided for in the 2013 Constitution as part of efforts to address Zimbabwe’s history of political violence and conflict, including the Gukurahundi massacres of the 1980s. Although the constitutional provision was included in 2013, the enabling legislation was only passed and signed into law in January 2018. The Commission is designed as a time-limited body focused on truth, justice, healing and reconciliation.

== Legal framework ==
The NPRC is established by Part 6 of Chapter 12 of the Constitution of Zimbabwe (sections 251–253). Its detailed operations, powers and procedures are set out in the National Peace and Reconciliation Commission Act [Chapter 10:32]. The Commission is independent but must report to Parliament on its activities.

== Mandate and functions ==
The primary objective of the National Peace and Reconciliation Commission is to promote national healing, peace and reconciliation. According to its constitutional and legislative mandate, the Commission is tasked with ensuring post-conflict justice, healing and reconciliation; promoting peaceful resolution of disputes; encouraging truth-telling about the past and facilitating the making of amends; developing mechanisms for the prevention of future conflicts; establishing early warning systems; and mediating disputes among communities, organisations and individuals.

== Organisation ==
The Commission consists of a Chairperson and other Commissioners appointed by the President in accordance with the Constitution. It maintains a secretariat to support its operations. The official website of the Commission is nprc.org.zw.

== Activities ==
Since becoming operational in 2018, the National Peace and Reconciliation Commission has undertaken a range of practical activities across Zimbabwe. These include conducting provincial outreach and peace dialogues in all ten provinces, where communities have been encouraged to discuss historical grievances and pathways to healing. The Commission has also facilitated mediation processes in localised conflicts, particularly those involving land disputes, political violence and inter-community tensions.

A significant part of its work has focused on addressing the legacy of the Gukurahundi massacres. The NPRC has engaged with survivors and affected communities in Matabeleland and Midlands provinces through structured dialogues and healing processes. It has also developed and piloted early warning and early response mechanisms aimed at detecting and preventing the escalation of potential conflicts at community level.

In addition, the Commission has worked with traditional leaders, religious organisations and civil society groups to establish local peace committees. It has conducted public education campaigns on peacebuilding and reconciliation, and has submitted periodic reports to Parliament containing recommendations on measures to prevent the recurrence of politically motivated violence.

== 2026 constitutional amendment controversy ==
In February 2026, the Constitution of Zimbabwe Amendment (No. 3) Bill proposed the repeal of Part 6 of Chapter 12 of the Constitution, which would have abolished the National Peace and Reconciliation Commission and transferred its functions to the Zimbabwe Human Rights Commission. Critics, including civil society organisations and victims’ groups, argued that removing the dedicated commission would weaken efforts to address historical injustices and promote sustainable peace.

During the National Assembly committee stage in June 2026, following public representations and debate, the provision repealing the NPRC was removed. The Commission was retained in the version of the Bill passed by both Houses of Parliament and subsequently transmitted for presidential assent.
