= Zimbabwe Gender Commission =

Independent constitutional commission

Independent constitutional commission overview
- Formed: 2013
- Jurisdiction: Zimbabwe
- Headquarters: No. 38 Samora Machel Avenue, Harare, Zimbabwe
- Independent constitutional commission executive: Margaret Mukahanana-Sangarwe, Chairperson
- Website: zgc.co.zw

The Zimbabwe Gender Commission (ZGC) is an independent constitutional commission in Zimbabwe established under section 245 of the Constitution of Zimbabwe to promote gender equality. It is one of the independent commissions established under Chapter 12 of the Constitution to support democracy. The Commission monitors issues relating to gender equality, investigates possible violations of gender rights, receives and considers complaints, and advises the government and other institutions on measures to promote gender equality. It is operationalised by the Zimbabwe Gender Commission Act Chapter 10:31.

In 2026, a proposal in the Constitution of Zimbabwe Amendment (No. 3) Bill to repeal the standalone Commission and transfer its functions to the Zimbabwe Human Rights Commission was rejected by Parliament following strong public opposition, including from women's organisations and traditional leaders, and the Commission was retained.

== Establishment ==
The Zimbabwe Gender Commission was created as part of the 2013 Constitution, which established a new framework of independent commissions to support democracy and protect fundamental rights following the adoption of the new Constitution in a referendum. The Commission was formally appointed by President Robert Mugabe. Its first Chairperson was Margaret Mukahanana-Sangarwe, a veteran civil servant who had previously served as Permanent Secretary in several government ministries. The Commission began operations in the years following its appointment and has maintained a continuous presence as a dedicated institution for gender equality.

== Legal framework ==
The Commission's existence and core mandate are provided for in Part 4 of Chapter 12 of the Constitution of Zimbabwe (sections 245 and 246). Section 245 establishes the Commission and provides for the appointment of a Chairperson and other Commissioners by the President. Section 246 sets out its primary functions. The Zimbabwe Gender Commission Act [Chapter 10:31] provides further detail on the Commission's operations, powers, and procedures.

== Mandate and functions ==
According to section 246 of the Constitution, the Zimbabwe Gender Commission has the following functions:

- To monitor issues concerning gender equality and to ensure gender equality as provided for in the Constitution.
- To investigate possible violations of rights relating to gender equality.
- To receive and consider complaints from the public and to take such action in regard to the complaints as it considers appropriate.

The Commission also works to promote public awareness of gender equality, monitors compliance with Zimbabwe's obligations under international instruments such as the Convention on the Elimination of All Forms of Discrimination against Women (CEDAW), and engages with government, Parliament, civil society, and the private sector. It operates through thematic working groups covering areas including Gender, Constitutional and Legal Rights; Gender and Economic Empowerment; Gender, Politics and Decision Making; Gender and Health; Gender, Socio-Cultural and Religious Issues; and Gender, Environment and Climate Change. Its vision is a society that enjoys gender equality by 2030, and its mission is to promote and protect gender equality.

== Organisation ==
The Commission consists of a Chairperson and eight other Commissioners appointed by the President in terms of the Constitution. As of 2026, the Chairperson is Margaret Mukahanana-Sangarwe. The Commission maintains a secretariat to support its work. Its headquarters are located at No. 38 Samora Machel Avenue, Harare (the former Nestlé Building). It operates toll-free complaint lines and maintains an official website.

== Activities ==
The Commission conducts monitoring and oversight of gender equality across public and private institutions, carries out investigations into complaints of gender discrimination and gender-based violence, and produces reports on the state of gender equality in Zimbabwe. It organises provincial and national gender forums, public education campaigns, and commemorates international days such as International Women's Day. The Commission engages with regional and international bodies, including the African Commission on Human and Peoples' Rights and UN Women, and has submitted reports and participated in reviews of Zimbabwe's compliance with gender equality commitments.

== 2026 constitutional amendment controversy ==
In February 2026, the Constitution of Zimbabwe Amendment (No. 3) Bill (commonly known as CAB3) proposed, among other changes, the repeal of Part 4 of Chapter 12 of the Constitution, which would have abolished the standalone Zimbabwe Gender Commission and transferred its functions to the Zimbabwe Human Rights Commission. The government argued that the Human Rights Commission could absorb the gender mandate as part of broader institutional rationalisation.

The proposal faced significant opposition from civil society organisations, women's groups (including the Women's Coalition of Zimbabwe), and traditional leaders. Critics argued that a dedicated, standalone commission was essential to keep gender equality visible and prioritised, and that absorption into a broader human rights body risked diluting focus on women's rights and gender-specific issues. During the National Assembly committee stage in June 2026, following public representations and debate, the provision repealing the Gender Commission was removed. The Commission was retained in the version of the Bill passed by both Houses of Parliament. This outcome was welcomed by supporters of the Commission as affirmation of its importance.
