= Campaigning for the 2008 Zimbabwean presidential election =

Campaigning for the first round of the presidential election held in Zimbabwe on 29 March 2008 took place from February to March. There were three major candidates: President Robert Mugabe of the ruling Zimbabwe African National Union - Patriotic Front (ZANU-PF), Morgan Tsvangirai of the opposition Movement for Democratic Change (MDC, Tsvangirai faction), and the independent candidate Simba Makoni.

== Beginning of campaigning ==
Mugabe declared on 12 February that he was "raring to go and raring to fly". Speaking at a rally in Beitbridge on 23 February, he likened Makoni to "a frog trying to inflate itself up to the size of an ox" that was sure to burst, while calling Tsvangirai a Western puppet. Predicting an easy victory for ZANU-PF, he vowed that "regime change" would never occur in Zimbabwe. Mugabe launched his re-election campaign on 29 February in Harare and presented ZANU-PF's election manifesto. He promised increased agricultural production and the reform and improvement of the mining sector, and he urged the party to acknowledge past failures, such as in the area of infrastructure development. He said that ZANU-PF was united under his leadership: "the struggles within the party that have taken place, and in some cases little wars, have been settled. At the end of the day, we have this congregation with me at the head."

Tsvangirai launched his campaign and presented the MDC's election manifesto on 23 February in Mutare. Promising to deliver economic recovery, he said that the MDC had "studied this economy comprehensively and we know what is wrong with it", and that he could put "this economy back on its feet with 100 days of forming a democratic government". Mugabe and ZANU-PF, according to Tsvangirai, "belong[ed] to the past", had "run out of ideas", and could not rescue the economy. Tsvangirai also said that he would place a priority on the creation of a new constitution. He argued that the people wanted total change and not merely partial reform, comparing the former to new clothes and the latter to patching up tattered clothes; this was viewed as a critical reference to Makoni's candidacy.

Speaking at a press conference in Bulawayo on 1 March, prior to the launch of Makoni's campaign, former Interior Minister Dumiso Dabengwa and former Speaker of Parliament Cyril Ndebele announced their support for Makoni.

== Events during the campaign ==
While US Ambassador James D. McGee pointed to "ominous signs" that the election would not be free and fair in an open letter in late February, Zambian Foreign Minister Kabinge Pande said that signs were encouraging and that regional leaders believed the election would be free and fair. Zambian President Levy Mwanawasa suggested that the West might not be willing to acknowledge the legitimacy of the election unless Mugabe was defeated.

The Herald, Zimbabwe's state-owned daily newspaper, reported on 29 February that Retired Major General Paradzayi Zimondi, the head of the prison service, gave his officers an order to vote for Mugabe. He said that Tsvangirai and Makoni would reverse land reform if they were elected, and he vowed to resign from his post and return to his farm to protect it if Mugabe were defeated. Makoni has said that he would continue land reform and would not take back any redistributed land unless it was improperly gained. Subsequently, Defence Forces Commander Constantine Chiwenga said that the army supported Mugabe and would "not support or salute sell-outs and agents of the West before, during and after the presidential elections".

On 4 March, The Herald reported that several important foreign corporations, including Citigroup, South African Breweries-Miller, and Actis Africa, were providing financial assistance to Makoni's campaign; the newspaper called this proof that Makoni's "election bid was part of the Western regime change agenda".

Makoni said in an interview with Agence France-Presse in early March that he anticipated getting at least 72% of the vote and that he was only interested in the concerns of Zimbabweans, not those of the West. According to Makoni, Mugabe "has a very special place in our history" and would receive "the due respect that our African culture and African standards demand of us" if Makoni won the election, stressing that he was "not about retribution and victimisation". In an interview with the Financial Times published on 17 March, he repeated that he would not seek retribution against Mugabe if he won the election, although he said that Mugabe had "a lot to answer for" and would still be subject to the law. According to Makoni, he wanted to form a national unity government that would include both ZANU-PF and the MDC.

On 5 March, The Herald reported that Mugabe told a rally in Bazely Bridge that "the British had identified people within Zanu-PF to work with in causing divisions in the party because it realised the ruling party was a united revolutionary liberation movement that had to be destroyed from within". He distributed over 200 computers to Manicaland schools and said that food and farm equipment would also be sent. On the same day, Mugabe said at a rally in Mahusekwa that some businesses were raising prices with the intent of causing the people to suffer, hoping that they would blame the government for their suffering and vote for the opposition as a result.

The European Union expressed concern on 10 March that "the humanitarian, political and economic situation in Zimbabwe and conditions on the ground" might "endanger the holding of free and fair parliamentary and presidential elections". It said that European observers had not been invited. While not inviting any observers from the EU or the United States, Zimbabwe has invited 47 observer teams, including observers from the Southern African Development Community (SADC), the African Union, China, Russia, and Iran. On 11 March, the arrival of the first 50 observers from SADC was reported, with more expected. SADC Secretary-General Tomaz Salomao said in a press conference in Harare on 12 March that SADC was confident "that the tradition of peace encapsulated in the unquestionable political maturity and tolerance shall, once again guide Zimbabweans as they go to the polls".

In light of Zimbabwe's dramatic inflation rate, Mugabe massively raised the salaries of members of the security forces in February, and on 10 March he approved raises for teachers and civil servants. At around the same time, he signed the Indigenisation and Economic Empowerment Bill, which requires all businesses to be majority owned (at least 51%) by black Zimbabweans. Mugabe subsequently accused business of raising prices to nullify the benefit of the pay raises, demanding that the price increases be reversed and warning that "profiteering" white-owned businesses would be taken over by the government.

Human Rights Watch stated that the Electoral Commission was inadequately prepared for the polls and that the opposition was not being treated equally to the governing ZANU-PF by the authorities. The government rejected these accusations; Deputy Information Minister Bright Matonga said that both ZANU-PF and the MDC were represented on the Electoral Commission and that Human Rights Watch's report reflected an agenda. In a report issued on 19 March, Human Rights Forum claimed strong media bias in favour of Mugabe and the use of intimidation and threats against opposition supporters; it also alleged that the Electoral Commission is merely a front for the Registrar's Office, which it said is partisan in favour of ZANU-PF.

Mugabe has used the campaign slogan "vote for the fist", reflecting ZANU-PF militancy; the MDC replied to this slogan by saying that "we cannot feed people with clenched fists", while Makoni has said that "the fist has become a hammer smashing the country".

The Electoral Court ruled against an MDC petition asking for electronic copies of the voter rolls to be made available, saying that this was out of the Court's jurisdiction, on 13 March. An application requesting electronic copies was subsequently filed at the Harare High Court on 17 March. An electronic list would facilitate searching the rolls for discrepancies. The presence in the voter rolls of Desmond Lardner-Burke, a Rhodesian Minister of Law and Order who died decades before, has been pointed to as an example of flaws in the voter rolls. On 20 March, Tsvangirai held a news conference at which he claimed that, in 28 rural constituencies, there were 90,000 names on the voter rolls that could not be accounted for. He said that he based this claim on the work of independent analysts. He also protested a plan by the Electoral Commission to have votes in the presidential election counted separately, at the national level, while votes for the parliamentary and local elections would be counted locally at the polling stations. According to Tsvangirai, who demanded that all votes be counted at the polling stations, this was illegal, and he said that he would "not participate in such a process". Furthermore, he said that while only 20,000 postal ballots were necessary, the Electoral Commission had ordered 600,000 of them. MDC Secretary-General Tendai Biti claimed on 23 March that correspondence had been discovered indicating that the Electoral Commission had requested the printing of nine million ballots, far more than the number of registered voters. According to Biti, this demonstrated an intention to rig the election in favour of Mugabe. Biti also said that 600,000 postal ballots had been ordered for police, soldiers, civil servants working away from home, and diplomats and their families who are posted in other countries. According to Biti, this was wildly disproportionate to the actual number of postal ballots needed; he said that the number of police and soldiers combined was 50,000 at most. Electoral Commission Deputy Chairwoman Joyce Kazembe rejected the allegation that extra ballots were being printed to facilitate fraud, saying that only a small number of extra ballots had been printed to account for spoilt ballots.

On 23 March, Mugabe held a rally in Bulawayo, the country's second largest city, which is considered a stronghold of the MDC. At the rally, he accused the MDC of seeking the reversal of land reform and urging other countries to intensify sanctions on Zimbabwe, and he said that ZANU-PF had not been split by Makoni's candidacy and Dabengwa's decision to back Makoni. For his part, Tsvangarai rejected the idea that he was hostile to land reform, saying that he made land reform proposals as early as 1995. He did, however, say that he wanted to establish an independent commission to confiscate farms from individuals who owned more than one.

According to the South Africa-based Zimbabwe Solidarity Forum at a media briefing on 20 March, Zimbabweans living outside the country would not be able to vote because of a constitutional requirement that a voter have lived within a constituency for at least one year prior to the election.

== Opinion polls and conclusion of campaign ==
According to a March 2008 poll by the Mass Public Opinion Institute, Mugabe stands at 20% support, with 28% for Tsvangirai and 9% for Makoni. The remaining, undecided voters were deemed more likely to vote for the opposition than for Mugabe. Tsvangirai claimed Mugabe could not win the election due to the state of the economy, a record of alleged repression, and his age, but would try to steal it. He said that the MDC hoped to pre-empt the Electoral Commission by conducting its own count and releasing results first. On 23 March, he claimed that most members of the police and the Central Intelligence Organisation were "behind the people" and "committed to defend the new Zimbabwe", despite the statements from leading figures in the security forces expressing support for Mugabe. He said that members of the security forces had "nothing to fear" if he won the election, as long as they "protect[ed] the national voices of Zimbabweans" and were "committed to the constitutional order in this country".

Marwick Khumalo, the head of the observer group of the AU's Pan-African Parliament, said in an interview published in The Herald on 24 March that his group was concerned only with the electoral process itself, not with the outcome. He said that his group had "not come to prescribe to Zimbabwe how they should conduct their elections" and that "the purpose of our mission here is to ensure that the elections meet the standards of the African Union Charter on Democracy, Elections and Governance and the African Union Declaration on Elections, Democracy and Governance in Africa."

Another survey, conducted by Dr. Joseph Kurebwa, a lecturer in the department of political science at the University of Zimbabwe, as an independent consultant was reported by The Herald on 28 March as predicting that Mugabe would win a first round majority with 56% of the vote, followed by Tsvangirai with 26–27%, Makoni with 13–14%, and Towungana with 0.2%. The survey was based on the views of 10,322 participants, and all of the country's wards were represented in the survey. Dr. Kurebwa is seen by many as a ZANU PF functionary in the mould of Professor Claude Mararike, who has been making the same predictions since 2000 based on what he terms a simulation of voting patterns in Zimbabwe on a sample selected by him. Opponents claim that the Herald, seen by observers as a government mouthpiece, has misrepresented the university's position.

CNN was denied permission to cover the election, according to an official at the Ministry of Information and Publicity on 25 March 2008. Many other foreign media outlets, such as South Africa's e.tv, were also denied accreditation by the government.

A few days before the election, Makoni's spokesman said that his campaign's advertisements were being excluded from the state media. His campaign manager, Nkosana Moyo, said on 26 March that, in addition to a national unity government, Makoni would establish some sort of truth and reconciliation process if he won the election. He also said that Makoni would take a different approach to land reform and would review any unjustified confiscations of land. Furthermore, Moyo made it clear that if Makoni placed third and was excluded from a potential second round, he would back Tsvangirai. At around the same time, the United States State Department urged the government and the Electoral Commission "to take concrete actions to address … significant shortcomings", and Amnesty International criticised what it alleged was intimidation of the opposition by the police.

The government's "Look East" policy, based on deepening economic relationships with a number of countries in Asia and the Middle East, was touted by Mugabe as the solution to Zimbabwe's economic problems. According to Mugabe, the Zimbabwean economy had not yet recovered because it was linked too closely to the West, but he said during the campaign that continuing the "Look East" policy would soon lead to economic recovery. He also said that Zimbabwe was learning from economic policies in some Asian countries that focused on the development of small and medium enterprises, arguing that these policies, unlike those favoured by the West, empowered people locally.

On 27 March, Mugabe dissolved his Cabinet ahead of the election. Regarding the composition of a new Cabinet following the election, he said that "the good performers will return, the poor performers will drop".

The MDC said that if Mugabe was declared the winner of the election, the result could be violence of the sort seen in Kenya following that country's December 2007 presidential election, although Tsvangirai told his supporters to not engage in violence. At a rally in Nyanga District, Mugabe responded to the suggestion of violence by saying: "Just dare try it. We don't play around while you try to please your British allies. Just try it and you will see. We want to see you do it." He stressed the importance of having a peaceful atmosphere and said that the losing side must be prepared to acknowledge defeat. On 28 March, the security forces were placed on full alert. At a press conference on that day, National Police Commissioner Augustine Chihuri warned the opposition to avoid violence, saying that violence "is a monster that can devour its creator, as it is blind and not selective in nature".

In a joint statement on 27 March, Tsvangirai, Makoni, and Mutambara said that independent analysis of the voter lists demonstrated that there were major discrepancies and alleged the existence of "a very well thought out and sophisticated plan to steal the election from us". They said that, in the period from December 2007 to February 2008, the number of voters on the voter registration list had increased by 11% in rural areas but by only 2% in urban areas. Tsvangirai said that officials and election workers should ignore any instructions to falsify the results, and he called on voters to stay at their polling stations after voting so that they could prevent fraud.

Mugabe concluded his campaign on 28 March with a rally near Harare, vowing to win a victory that would deal "a final blow" to the British, who he described as the puppeteers of Tsvangirai and Makoni.
