= Constitution of Zimbabwe Amendment (No. 3) Act, 2026 =

Constitutional Amendment Bill in Zimbabwe

Parliament of Zimbabwe
- Long title: Constitution of Zimbabwe Amendment (No. 3) Act, No. 6 of 2026
- Citation: No. 6 of 2026
- Territorial extent: Zimbabwe
- Enacted by: National Assembly
- Enacted: 18 June 2026
- Enacted by: Senate
- Enacted: 24 June 2026
- Assented to by: Emmerson Mnangagwa
- Assented to: 7 July 2026
- Signed by: Emmerson Mnangagwa
- Signed: 7 July 2026

Legislative history

Initiating chamber: National Assembly
- Bill title: Constitution of Zimbabwe Amendment (No. 3) Bill, 2026
- Bill citation: H.B. 1 of 2026
- Introduced by: Ziyambi Ziyambi, Minister of Justice, Legal and Parliamentary Affairs
- Introduced: 16 February 2026 (gazetted)
- Committee responsible: Portfolio Committee on Justice, Legal and Parliamentary Affairs
- First reading: 2 June 2026
- Second reading: 3–17 June 2026 (debated)
- Considered by the Portfolio Committee on Justice, Legal and Parliamentary Affairs Committee: Committee report presented (joint committees)
- Third reading: 18 June 2026
- Voting summary: 216 voted for; 42 voted against; 22 absent
- Passed: 30 June 2026
- Voting summary: 226 voted for; 41 voted against; 13 absent
- Committee report: Joint Portfolio and Thematic Committees report on CAB3

Revising chamber: Senate
- Bill title: Constitution of Zimbabwe Amendment (No. 3) Bill, 2026 (H.B. 1 of 2026)
- Bill citation: H.B. 1 of 2026
- Member(s) in charge: Ziyambi Ziyambi, Minister of Justice, Legal and Parliamentary Affairs
- Second reading: 23–24 June 2026 (debated)
- Third reading: 24 June 2026
- Voting summary: 75 voted for; 4 voted against; 1 absent

Final stages
- Senate amendments considered by the National Assembly: June 2026
- Finally passed both chambers: 30 June 2026

Amends
- Constitution of Zimbabwe (2013)

Related legislation
- Constitution of Zimbabwe Amendment (No. 1) Act, 2017; Constitution of Zimbabwe Amendment (No. 2) Act, 2021

Summary
- Major amendments to the 2013 Constitution including: election of the President by joint sitting of Parliament instead of direct popular vote; extension of presidential, parliamentary, and local authority terms from five to seven years (with transitional provisions); expansion of the Senate with ten additional presidential appointees; establishment of a new Electoral Delimitation Commission; transfer of the voters' roll to the Registrar-General; reforms to judicial appointments and commissions; and other institutional changes.

Keywords
- Constitutional amendment, presidential election by Parliament, term extension, Senate expansion, electoral reform, Zimbabwe
- Status: Current legislation

The Constitution of Zimbabwe Amendment (No. 3) Act, 2026, officially titled the Constitution of Zimbabwe Amendment (No. 3) Act, 2026, and known colloquially as CAB3, is an Act of the Parliament of Zimbabwe that amends the 2013 Constitution. It was introduced as the Constitution of Zimbabwe Amendment (No. 3) Bill, 2026 (H.B. 1 of 2026) in February 2026, and signed into force by President Emmerson Mnangagwa on 7 July 2026.

The Act makes wide-ranging changes to the 2013 Constitution, including replacing the direct popular election of the President with election by a joint sitting of Parliament, extending the terms of office of the President, Parliament and local authorities from five to seven years, enlarging the Senate and allowing the President to appoint ten additional senators on the basis of professional skills, establishing a new Zimbabwe Electoral Delimitation Commission, transferring responsibility for the voters’ roll to the Registrar-General, and (as introduced) repealing the Zimbabwe Gender Commission and the National Peace and Reconciliation Commission (with functions transferred to the Zimbabwe Human Rights Commission). The Bill was published in a Government Gazette Extraordinary on 16 February 2026, triggering the 90-day public consultation period required by section 328(3) of the Constitution.

The government has described the amendments as "constructive reforms" intended to reinforce constitutional governance, strengthen democratic structures, clarify institutional mandates, promote long-term stability and align the Constitution with contemporary African constitutional practices. Critics, including opposition parties, civil society organisations and independent constitutional analysts, argue that the changes would erode democratic gains of the 2013 Constitution, reduce public participation in presidential selection, weaken checks and balances, and potentially extend the current President’s tenure until 2030.

The public consultation period concluded in mid-May 2026. The Bill was introduced in the National Assembly in early June 2026, passed by that House on 18 June 2026 by 216 votes to 42, and passed by the Senate on 24 June 2026 by 75 votes to 4 (with one abstention) with six amendments. President Emmerson Mnangagwa recalled the National Assembly from recess and summoned it to an extraordinary sitting on 30 June 2026, at which the Senate amendments were adopted by 226 votes to 41. The Bill received final parliamentary approval on 30 June 2026. On 7 July 2026, President Emmerson Mnangagwa assented to the Bill and signed it into law as the Constitution of Zimbabwe Amendment (No. 3) Act, 2026. There had been ongoing public and legal debate as to whether certain entrenched provisions, particularly those affecting presidential term limits and election methods, required approval by referendum under section 328 of the Constitution.

== Background ==
The Act follows the Constitution of Zimbabwe Amendment (No. 2) Act 2021 and forms part of ongoing efforts by the ZANU–PF-led government to refine the 2013 Constitution. It is closely linked to the ruling party's "2030 agenda", which was adopted at the ZANU–PF annual people's conference in Bulawayo in 2024 and aims to provide long-term political stability and policy continuity for the implementation of Zimbabwe's national development blueprint, Vision 2030. The government has presented the amendments as necessary to reduce "election-related toxicity" and create an enabling environment for sustained economic transformation under Vision 2030, which seeks to turn Zimbabwe into an upper-middle-income economy by 2030.

Cabinet approved the draft on 10 February 2026. Speaker of Parliament gave notice of its publication on 16 February 2026, and it appeared in a Government Gazette Extraordinary the same day. Under section 328 of the Constitution, the Bill must undergo a mandatory 90-day period of public consultation before it can be formally introduced in the National Assembly.

President Emmerson Mnangagwa has on several occasions described himself as a "constitutionalist" and pledged, including at his 2018 inauguration and in subsequent public statements, to respect the 2013 Constitution and not serve more than the two five-year terms it permits. Despite these commitments, the Act's transitional provisions extend the current presidential term from five to seven years, allowing him to remain in office until 2030, instead of 2028 when he was due to leave office under the previous provisions.

== Key provisions ==
The Act (as introduced as a Bill) contains 29 clauses that amend or repeal various sections of the Constitution. The major changes are as follows:

- Election of the President (Clause 2): The President is now elected by a joint sitting of Parliament. A candidate requires more than half the valid votes; a run-off is held if necessary. The election is conducted by the Zimbabwe Electoral Commission in accordance with the Electoral Law and Standing Orders.
- Extension of terms of office (Clauses 3, 7 and 8): Terms of the President, Parliament and local authorities are extended from five to seven years. Transitional provisions expressly apply the new seven-year term to the current President, Senate and National Assembly.
- Senate composition (Clause 6): The Senate is increased from 80 to 90 members. The President may appoint ten additional senators chosen for professional skills and competencies after consultation with the National Assembly.
- Electoral matters: A new Delimitation Commission is established (separate from the Zimbabwe Electoral Commission). Responsibility for voter registration and maintenance of the voters’ roll is transferred to the Registrar-General.
- Judicial appointments: The President appoints judges after consultation with the Judicial Service Commission. Structural changes are made to the Supreme Court and the role of the Judge President of the Supreme Court.
- Repeal of commissions: Part 6 of Chapter 12 (National Peace and Reconciliation Commission) is repealed. The proposed repeal of the Zimbabwe Gender Commission was removed during the parliamentary process and does not appear in the final Act.

== Public consultation and hearings ==
Section 328(4) of the Constitution requires Parliament to invite public views through public meetings and written submissions and to provide adequate facilities for citizens to express their views. Public hearings on the Bill commenced on 30 March 2026 and ran until approximately 2 April 2026—one meeting per administrative district, each lasting under three hours. Written submissions could be sent to the Clerk of Parliament until 17 May 2026.

The government reported receiving over 500,000 written submissions, claiming an overwhelming majority in support. Day one of the hearings on 30 March 2026 was marked by venue chaos, overcrowding and political tension, according to observers. In Bulawayo, the City Hall venue proved significantly undersized relative to the large number of attendees. Allegations emerged that many participants had been bussed in from outside the city, raising concerns about the authenticity of public representation. The absence of a standardised, transparent process for selecting speakers from the floor raised concerns about perceived partiality.

At the Bulawayo City Hall hearing, former cabinet minister and Bulawayo Mayor David Coltart and veteran activist Judith Todd, daughter of former Rhodesian Prime Minister Sir Garfield Todd, were denied the opportunity to speak despite arriving on time and attempting to contribute. Coltart, who sat in the front row and repeatedly raised his hand, stated that the chair "studiously ignored both Judith Todd and me". The meeting was brought to an abrupt end at approximately 11:30, preventing both from presenting their views. Coltart described the incident as a deliberate exclusion that undermined the credibility of the process.

In Harare, chaos erupted at the City Sports Centre hearing. Human rights lawyer Douglas Coltart (son of David Coltart) was assaulted by suspected ZANU–PF supporters while attempting to leave after trying to make submissions. He was manhandled, his phone and glasses were stolen, and the incident was captured on video. Two ZANU–PF officials — Nicholas Hamadziripi and central committee member Luckmore Tinashe Gapa, a former ZANU-PF parliamentary candidate — were identified in connection with the attack. The assault drew widespread condemnation and calls for accountability.

Broader concerns were raised about the compressed nature of the hearings, which were held at district level rather than constituency level and scheduled over just a few days. Independent analysts and constitutional watchdogs argue that this approach fails to meet the constitutional requirement under section 328(4) for meaningful public participation, as each district received only one short meeting (often under three hours) regardless of population size or number of constituencies. They claim this risks producing a process in which minority or managed views are presented as national consensus and increases the potential for intimidation or suppression of dissenting voices.

The Law Society of Zimbabwe, in its May 2026 analysis, highlighted serious legal concerns with several provisions (including the transfer of voter registration functions, the new delimitation commission, expanded presidential appointment powers over judges and the Prosecutor-General, and the application of term extensions to incumbents) while noting that some changes, such as the shift to parliamentary election of the President, were not substantively unconstitutional though they dilute direct democratic participation. It emphasised that term-limit changes applying to current office-holders require a referendum under section 328(9).

Legal challenges contesting procedural aspects of the Bill’s introduction were filed in the Constitutional Court. These included applications by activists represented by Lovemore Madhuku questioning the validity of Cabinet’s approval process and by former Member of Parliament Prince Dubeko Sibanda challenging specific clauses as inconsistent with section 328 of the Constitution. On 17 June 2026 the Constitutional Court struck off two such challenges (without determining the merits), ruling that the issues should first be ventilated in the High Court.

== Passage through Parliament ==
Following the conclusion of the public consultation period, the Bill was formally presented and read a first time in the National Assembly on 2 June 2026 by the Minister of Justice, Legal and Parliamentary Affairs, Ziyambi Ziyambi. The second reading and committee stages took place in early to mid-June 2026, with debates focusing on the proposed shift from direct presidential elections, term extensions, electoral reforms, and the repeal of commissions.

During the National Assembly committee stage, the Bill was amended to retain the Zimbabwe Gender Commission (originally proposed for repeal), following representations including from traditional leaders and public submissions highlighting its importance for gender equality. The National Assembly passed the Bill at its final (third) reading on 18 June 2026 by 216 votes to 42 — comfortably exceeding the two-thirds majority (187 votes) required by section 328(5) of the Constitution.

The Bill proceeded to the Senate, where it underwent second reading on 23–24 June and third reading on 24 June 2026. It was passed by 75 votes to 4 (with one absence), again exceeding the required two-thirds majority. The Senate version incorporated the National Assembly amendments, including retention of the Gender Commission, together with six further amendments made by the Senate.

President Emmerson Mnangagwa recalled the National Assembly from recess and summoned it to an extraordinary sitting on 30 June 2026 to consider the Senate amendments. The National Assembly adopted the amendments on that date by 226 votes to 41, granting the Bill final parliamentary approval. The Bill was transmitted to President Mnangagwa for assent. On 7 July 2026, President Emmerson Mnangagwa assented to the Bill and signed it into law as the Constitution of Zimbabwe Amendment (No. 3) Act, 2026, which was subsequently gazetted.

The government had maintained that no referendum was required, citing legal advice from the Attorney-General. Opposition parties, civil society groups and some constitutional experts had argued that provisions altering presidential term limits and the method of electing the President are entrenched and require approval by a majority of voters in a referendum under section 328.

== Reactions ==
The government and ZANU–PF have welcomed the Act as a modernisation measure that will reduce "election-related toxicity", allow more time for development projects and bring Zimbabwe into line with practices in other African democracies. The official memorandum accompanying the Bill described the proposed changes as "constructive reforms" that "reinforce constitutional governance, strengthen democratic structures, clarify institutional mandates" and harmonise Zimbabwe’s constitutional order with "tested and successful practices in other progressive jurisdictions". Permanent Secretary in the Ministry of Information Nick Mangwana described the process as a "legitimate legislative exercise" aimed at enhancing political stability and policy continuity, rejecting claims of a "constitutional coup" and stating there was no legal requirement for a referendum.

Supporters, including the ZANU–PF Youth League and some traditional leaders, have described the Act as promoting stability and national development, arguing the changes are essential for long-term policy continuity and the successful implementation of major infrastructure and economic projects under Vision 2030.

Opposition parties have strongly criticised the Act. Leaders from the Citizens Coalition for Change (CCC), including Tendai Biti and Jameson Timba, have described the amendments as an attempt to centralise power in the executive, diminish the role of the electorate in choosing the President and undermine institutional independence. Douglas Mwonzora of the MDC Alliance and other opposition figures have similarly condemned the proposals. Following passage and assent, opposition and civil society groups labelled the outcome a "constitutional coup" that strips citizens of the right to directly elect the President and replaces popular sovereignty with selection by a captured legislature.

Civil society groups have expressed strong concerns. The National Constitutional Assembly (NCA), the Constitutional Defenders Forum (convened by Tendai Biti), Zimbabwe Lawyers for Human Rights and the Zimbabwe Peace Project have warned that the amendments erode the democratic gains of the 2013 Constitution, weaken checks and balances, and that the compressed public hearing process — combined with reports of intimidation and violence — undermined meaningful participation. They had called for the Bill to be subjected to a referendum.

Legal experts have been particularly vocal. Constitutional lawyer and NCA leader Professor Lovemore Madhuku has described the proposed amendments as "totally unacceptable" and filed court applications challenging procedural validity, stating that the movers have "no respect for the people". Human rights lawyer and constitutional analyst D. Tinashé Hofisi has characterised the Bill as "executive consolidation by constitutional disruption", arguing that it weakens public participation in presidential selection and undermines the separation of powers. The Law Society of Zimbabwe’s detailed analysis raised serious concerns about several clauses while affirming that term extensions for incumbents require a referendum.

In early July 2026, human rights lawyer Douglas Coltart warned that drafting flaws in the Senate amendments could create a legal loophole allowing a replacement president chosen by Parliament in the event of a vacancy to commence a fresh seven-year term rather than completing the unexpired portion of the predecessor’s term. Because the parliamentary term is linked to the date of the President’s assumption of office, this could reset both terms and indefinitely postpone future harmonised elections. Coltart issued a legal opinion to members of the National Assembly urging them to preserve fixed electoral cycles.

Vice President Constantino Chiwenga has made several interventions on the Bill. On or around 2 July 2026 he circulated a cryptic video message using the biblical story of Lazarus to argue that Jesus deliberately sought the participation of others in the miracle, applying this to the constitutional amendment process and implying that meaningful public participation, including via referendum, should have occurred. Chiwenga has consistently campaigned against CAB3 proceeding without a referendum on entrenched provisions and has referenced other biblical stories in previous warnings against extending power. Analysts have linked his stance to succession politics within ZANU–PF.

International observers and human rights organisations, including Amnesty International, expressed concern ahead of the public hearings about guarantees of free expression and safety. Post-passage commentary in outlets such as The Guardian has highlighted opposition fears of a return to more repressive governance and the tightening of executive control.
