= Gukurahundi =

Civil conflict and genocide in Zimbabwe (1982–87)

- Part of aftermath of the Zimbabwe War of Independence
- Location: Zimbabwe
- Date: 3 January 1983 – 22 December 1987
- Target: Ndebele and Kalanga peoples
- Attack type: Genocide, pogrom, torture, indefinite detention, mass murder
- Deaths: 8,000–30,000
- Perpetrators: President Robert Mugabe, Fifth Brigade; Central Intelligence Organisation
- Motive: Anti-Ndebele sentiment, anti-Kalanga sentiment, Racism, Tribalism, suppressing opposition to the ZANU

Gukurahundi, also known as the Matabeleland Massacres, was a series of mass killings and widespread atrocities, widely understood to constitute genocide, committed in Zimbabwe from early 1983 until the Unity Accord in December 1987. The campaign was carried out primarily by the North Korean-trained Fifth Brigade of the Zimbabwe National Army (ZNA) in the Matabeleland North, Matabeleland South and Midlands provinces. It targeted mainly Ndebele and Kalanga civilians, as well as perceived supporters of opposition leader Joshua Nkomo and his Zimbabwe African People's Union (ZAPU).

The name Gukurahundi is a Shona term that loosely translates as "the early rain which washes away the chaff before the spring rains". It was originally used by ZANU during the Rhodesian Bush War to describe an ideological strategy of taking the war into villages and homesteads. After independence the term became associated with the Fifth Brigade's operations.

A broad consensus among scholars, local communities, and the International Association of Genocide Scholars (IAGS) has determined that twenty thousand or more people were killed, the great majority of them civilians. Journalist Heidi Holland referred to a death toll of 8,000 as a typical conservative estimate.

== Background ==
Before the Rhodesian Bush War the main black nationalist organisation in Southern Rhodesia, the Zimbabwe African People's Union (ZAPU), split in 1963. The breakaway group became the Zimbabwe African National Union (ZANU). ZANU recruited mainly from Shona-speaking regions while ZAPU drew strong support from Ndebele-speaking areas in the west, although it remained a multi-ethnic party with significant Shona support in other provinces.

There is a much earlier source for Ndebele hostility to the Shona, going back to the arrival in 1837 of Mzilikazi and his Matabeleland kingdom. Mzilikazi carved out a territory for himself by fighting and dispossessing the local VaRozvi led by Changamire Chirisamhuru.

Tensions between the two movements' armed wings—ZAPU's Zimbabwe People's Revolutionary Army (ZIPRA) and ZANU's Zimbabwe African National Liberation Army (ZANLA)—were already evident during the liberation struggle. After independence in 1980 and the difficult integration of the two armies into the new Zimbabwe National Army, mutual distrust persisted.

In November 1980 and February 1981 serious clashes broke out at Entumbane in Bulawayo (and spread to Glenville and Connemara). Inquiries, including one led by former Chief Justice Enoch Dumbutshena, found evidence that some ZIPRA elements had been preparing for renewed conflict. Many ZIPRA cadres subsequently deserted the integrated army.

The situation deteriorated further in February 1982 when the government announced the discovery of large arms caches on properties associated with ZAPU. ZAPU leaders were arrested or removed from cabinet. Although a subsequent treason trial failed to secure convictions, several leaders including Dumiso Dabengwa and Lookout Masuku were re-detained without trial. Many ex-ZIPRA soldiers, feeling vulnerable and harassed, deserted and took up arms as "dissidents". Joshua Nkomo publicly disowned the deserters.

== Fifth Brigade ==
In October 1980 Prime Minister Robert Mugabe signed an agreement with North Korean leader Kim Il-sung for the training of a new brigade. The unit, drawn overwhelmingly from ex-ZANLA guerrillas assembled at Tongogara Assembly Point, trained between August 1981 and September 1982. Its first commander was Colonel Perrance Shiri. Unlike other ZNA formations, the Fifth Brigade reported directly to the Prime Minister's office, used incompatible equipment and codes, and wore distinctive red berets. It was tasked with combating "dissidents" and "malcontents".

== Conflict and killings ==
In January 1983 the Fifth Brigade launched a major offensive in Matabeleland North that later extended to Matabeleland South and parts of the Midlands. The first months were particularly intense; after international attention and leaks the campaign became more covert but continued into 1984 and beyond.

Civilians were routinely rounded up, forced to sing Shona songs praising ZANU while being beaten, and subjected to public executions, often after digging their own graves. Mass shootings, burnings of people alive in huts (documented in Tsholotsho and Lupane), torture, rape, and arbitrary detention were widespread. Bhalagwe camp near Kezi/Maphisa became notorious as a detention and torture centre; bodies were disposed of in disused mine shafts. One of the largest single incidents occurred in March 1983 when at least 55 of 62 young people were shot on the banks of the Cewale River in Lupane District.

In Bulawayo, Ndebele men of fighting age were considered potential dissidents. Most detained were summarily executed or marched to re-education camps.

The government characterised the operations as a legitimate counter-insurgency against dissidents and accused foreign media and ZAPU of disinformation. Minister of National Security Sydney Sekeramayi claimed allegations were part of a ZAPU propaganda campaign. Dissident groups themselves committed serious abuses, killing an estimated 700–800 civilians (including 22 Shona civilians massacred in Mwenezi in August 1985 and 16 people on a mission farm in Matobo).

Historian Stuart Doran, using declassified documents, concludes that the massacres were driven from the top by ZANU–PF leadership in pursuit of specific political objectives, including the elimination of opposition ahead of the 1985 elections and the creation of conditions for a one-party state.

== Death estimates ==
The CCJP report remains the most detailed contemporary documentation, recording a minimum of roughly 2,000–2,750 deaths while noting the true toll was likely far higher. Local testimony, Joshua Nkomo and a wide range of scholars and the IAGS have consistently cited a figure of more than 20,000 deaths. Geoff Hill and others have noted local estimates ranging between 20,000 and 40,000. Journalist Heidi Holland referred to 8,000 as a typical conservative estimate.

== Reactions during the campaign ==
In 1992 serving Defence Minister Moven Mahachi became the first senior ZANU–PF official to apologise publicly for the execution and torture of civilians by the Fifth Brigade. In 1997 former Defence Minister Enos Nkala described his involvement as "eternal hell" and blamed President Mugabe.

At Joshua Nkomo’s memorial service on 2 July 2000, Mugabe acknowledged that "thousands" had been killed and described the episode as a "moment of madness".

International reaction at the time was limited. Declassified British documents show that UK officials had early detailed knowledge of the atrocities yet often minimised their scale for geopolitical reasons.

== Unity Accord of 1987 ==
On 22 December 1987 Robert Mugabe and Joshua Nkomo signed the Unity Accord, formally merging ZAPU into ZANU–PF. In April 1988 Mugabe announced an amnesty for dissidents; it was later extended to members of the security forces who had committed human rights violations. The accord ended the fighting but left deep, unaddressed grievances.

== Aftermath and legacy ==
The violence caused profound long-term damage: loss of life, destruction of social and economic infrastructure in Matabeleland and the Midlands, intergenerational trauma, and deep distrust of the state. Some descendants of victims have struggled to obtain birth certificates or other documents because parents’ deaths were never formally registered. The lack of justice or accountability for what is widely understood to be a genocide has meant that little reconciliation has been able to occur.

== National healing and transitional justice efforts ==
The Unity Accord was essentially an elite political settlement that ended hostilities without truth-telling, accountability or reparations for victims. Scholars have described it as "peace without reconciliation".

=== Early inquiries ===
While the killings were still occurring the government established the Chihambakwe Commission of Inquiry (1983), chaired by Justice Simplicius Chihambakwe. It investigated the deaths of approximately 1,500 people and gathered substantial testimony, but its report was never made public.

The Catholic Commission for Justice and Peace in Zimbabwe (CCJP), in its 1997 report Breaking the Silence, Building True Peace, documented a minimum of approximately 2,000–2,750 deaths with detailed victim testimony and estimated that the true figure could be as high as 8,000. It was at the time the most important civil-society documentation, and it called for greater openness as essential to reconciliation.

=== National Peace and Reconciliation Commission (NPRC) ===
The NPRC was established under the 2013 Constitution with a broad mandate to promote post-conflict justice, healing, reconciliation, victim rehabilitation and public education about the past. It conducted outreach and consultations in Matabeleland, including gender-sensitive work, but was severely constrained by limited funding, political interference and weak enforcement powers. Its term effectively ended around August 2023 without major extension or breakthrough on Gukurahundi. Many survivors expressed disillusionment.

=== Mnangagwa-era initiatives ===
After becoming president in 2017, Emmerson Mnangagwa (who had served as Minister of State for National Security during the Gukurahundi period) promised to address the legacy through exhumations, death certificates, birth certificates for descendants and broader healing measures. In mid-July 2024 the government launched the Gukurahundi Community Engagement Programme (also called the Community Engagement Outreach Programme). The initiative involves village-level hearings led by traditional chiefs, supported by women’s representatives and religious leaders. Priorities include exhumations and identification of remains from mass graves, truth-telling, psycho-social support and possible socio-economic assistance.

Survivors, activists (including Ibhetshu LikaZulu) and some traditional leaders have responded with deep scepticism. Critics argue that the process lacks official acknowledgment that the killings constituted genocide or state-orchestrated mass atrocities, offers no meaningful accountability for perpetrators (many of whom or their associates remain influential), and is insufficiently independent. They note Mnangagwa’s own role in the security apparatus at the time. Previous exhumation efforts have repeatedly stalled. Activists emphasise that without public admission of responsibility, full disclosure of past reports and perpetrator participation in truth-telling, the initiative risks becoming another superficial exercise.

=== Scholarly and community reflections ===
Academic literature on Gukurahundi memory, trauma and transitional justice consistently stresses that sustainable national healing requires official acknowledgment of the atrocities and the state’s role, inclusive victim-centred truth processes, reparations (individual, collective and regional), community-led memorialisation, and measures to address ongoing regional marginalisation.

Generational trauma is well documented; descendants carry psychological and social legacies even when they did not witness events directly. Community and cultural practices—oral histories, performance, literature and grassroots memorials—have emerged as important spaces for mourning and alternative memory work when official channels fall short.

Many scholars and activists argue that true reconciliation remains impossible until the past is fully and publicly acknowledged without qualification. While open discussion is now more possible than in previous decades, this is widely viewed as far from sufficient.

== In popular culture and scholarship ==
Zimbabwean author Christopher Mlalazi’s novel Running with Mother (2012) portrays the killings from a child’s perspective. NoViolet Bulawayo’s Booker-shortlisted novel Glory (2022) also engages with the legacy.

Scholarship has expanded significantly, exploring themes of memory, erasure, generational trauma, cultural resistance and the limitations of existing transitional justice mechanisms.
