= Constitution of Zimbabwe =

Supreme law of Zimbabwe

Constitution of the Republic of Zimbabwe
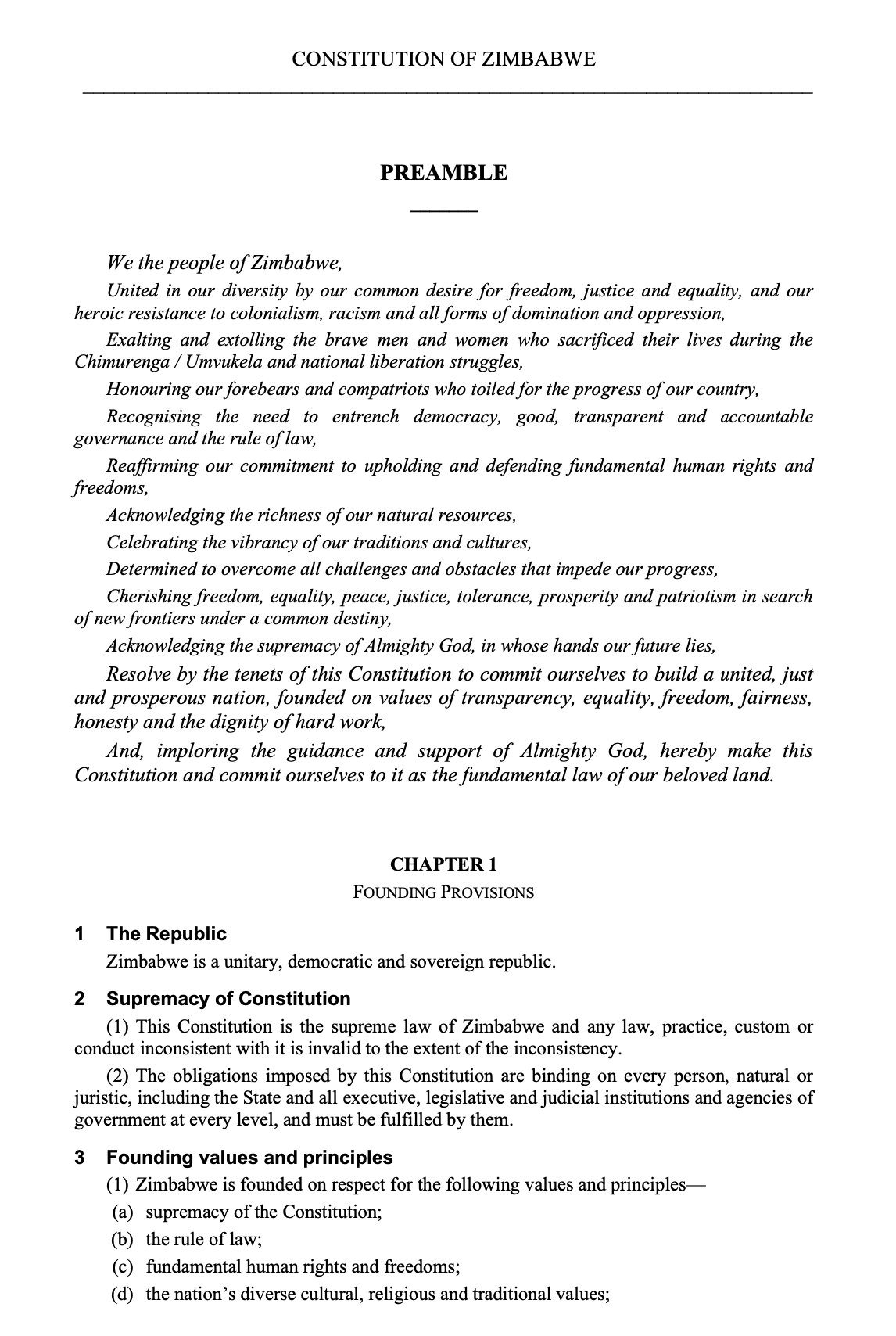
- Front page of the 2013 Constitution of Zimbabwe

Overview
- Jurisdiction: Zimbabwe
- Presented: 5 February 2013
- Ratified: 22 May 2013
- Date effective: 22 August 2013; 13 years ago
- System: Unitary assembly independent republic

Government structure
- Branches: 3
- Chambers: Bicameral
- Executive: President
- Judiciary: Constitutional, Supreme, High
- Federalism: No
- Electoral college: No
- Entrenchments: 0

History
- First legislature: 22 August 2013
- First executive: 22 August 2013
- Amendments: 3
- Last amended: 7 July 2026
- Citation: Constitution of Zimbabwe, as amended up to 20th June 2023 (PDF), 20 June 2023
- Commissioned by: 2008–2009 Zimbabwean political negotiations
- Author: Parliamentary Select Committee
- Signatories: Robert Mugabe
- Supersedes: Constitution of Zimbabwe Amendment (No. 19) Act, 2008

The Constitution of Zimbabwe is the supreme law of the Republic of Zimbabwe. It establishes the country as a unitary, democratic, assembly-independent (as of 2026 amendments) and sovereign republic governed by the rule of law, with a strong emphasis on fundamental rights, good governance, devolution of power and the separation of powers.

The current constitution was approved by referendum on 16–17 March 2013 and enacted as the Constitution of Zimbabwe Amendment (No. 20) Act 2013. It came into force on 22 August 2013, replacing the 1980 Lancaster House Constitution, which had been the subject of numerous amendments and widespread criticism for entrenching executive dominance. The 2013 document emerged from a protracted, internationally facilitated constitution-making process under the 2008 Global Political Agreement (GPA) and is widely regarded as one of the most progressive constitutions in Africa for its expansive Declaration of Rights and institutional safeguards.

== Lancaster House Constitution (1980) ==
The original Constitution of Zimbabwe, commonly known as the Lancaster House Constitution, was negotiated at the Lancaster House Conference in London between September and December 1979. It formed Annex C to the Lancaster House Agreement signed on 21 December 1979 by the British Government, the Patriotic Front (comprising ZANU and ZAPU) and the Rhodesian authorities. The constitution was enacted by British Order in Council on 6 December 1979 and came into force on Zimbabwe's independence day, 18 April 1980.

The Lancaster House Constitution established Zimbabwe as a sovereign republic with a Westminster-style parliamentary system designed as a transitional framework to achieve majority rule while protecting minority (primarily white) interests, particularly in land ownership. It declared Zimbabwe a sovereign republic whose Constitution was the supreme law. Citizenship was automatically granted to all former Rhodesian citizens, with generous registration provisions for others and allowance for dual citizenship. A justiciable Declaration of Rights protected fundamental freedoms—including the right to life, personal liberty, freedom from torture, slavery, deprivation of property (with prompt and adequate compensation remittable abroad), privacy, protection of the law, conscience, expression, assembly, association, movement and freedom from discrimination—subject to reasonable limitations in the public interest or during emergencies.

The executive comprised a ceremonial President (Head of State and Commander-in-Chief, elected by Parliament for a renewable six-year term) and an executive Prime Minister supported by a Cabinet. Parliament was bicameral: a 40-member Senate and a 100-member House of Assembly (80 elected on the common roll and 20 reserved for white voters on a separate roll for the first ten years). The judiciary featured an independent High Court with appellate and general divisions; judges were appointed on the advice of a Judicial Service Commission and removable only for misconduct or incapacity. Defence forces, police and public service commissions ensured professional, non-partisan administration. Land acquisition for resettlement required compensation, a provision intended to reassure white farmers.

Although not subjected to a popular referendum in Zimbabwe, the constitution was accepted by all parties as the basis for independence and the 1980 elections. It was intended to last ten years before major review, but political developments led to repeated amendments.

== Amendments prior to 2013 ==
Between 1980 and 2008 the Lancaster House Constitution was amended 19 times, fundamentally altering its character from a transitional, rights-protective document to one that concentrated power in the executive. Most amendments were passed by Parliament without popular consultation or referendum.

Major changes included Constitutional Amendment No. 7 of 1987, which abolished the ceremonial presidency and prime ministership, replacing them with an executive presidency following the merger of ZANU and ZAPU. Robert Mugabe became the first executive President. Amendment No. 9 of 1989 abolished the bicameral legislature, replacing the Senate with a unicameral House of Assembly enlarged to 150 members. Subsequent amendments addressed issues such as the abolition of white-reserved seats (1987), the reintroduction of corporal punishment (Amendment No. 11 of 1990) and, most controversially, land reform. Amendment No. 17 of 2005 nationalised land acquired under the fast-track land reform programme and ousted the jurisdiction of the courts to hear challenges to such acquisitions, effectively reversing earlier judicial rulings on property rights.

By the late 2000s the constitution had been so extensively altered that critics described it as a patchwork that entrenched one-party dominance and executive overreach while weakening judicial independence and property protections. These changes, combined with the absence of public participation, fuelled demands for a new, people-driven constitution.

== 2000 constitutional referendum ==
In 1999 the government established a Constitutional Commission to draft a new constitution. The draft retained strong executive powers and included provisions facilitating uncompensated land acquisition. It was submitted to a national referendum on 12–13 February 2000.

Voters rejected the proposal by 54.68% to 45.32% (697,754 "No" votes against 578,210 "Yes"), with turnout estimated at around 20–25%. Urban areas, particularly Harare and Bulawayo, voted overwhelmingly against the draft, while rural turnout was low. The National Constitutional Assembly and the newly formed Movement for Democratic Change campaigned vigorously against it, framing the referendum as a verdict on the Mugabe government's performance rather than the document alone. The defeat was a major political setback for ZANU–PF and triggered an intensification of the fast-track land reform programme and heightened political polarisation ahead of the June 2000 parliamentary elections.

== Drafting and adoption of the 2013 Constitution ==
The disputed 2008 presidential election led to the signing of the Global Political Agreement (GPA) on 15 September 2008 by ZANU–PF, MDC–T and MDC–M. Article VI of the GPA mandated the drafting of a new, "people-driven" constitution. The Constitution Select Committee of Parliament (COPAC) was established on 12 April 2009 to oversee the process.

COPAC conducted extensive nationwide outreach from June to October 2010, holding thousands of meetings and receiving input from over 1.1 million participants, plus special consultations with children, people with disabilities, the diaspora and institutions. Thematic committees analysed the data, and a draft was produced after protracted negotiations. Despite funding delays, political tensions and occasional violence, COPAC adopted a final draft on 31 January 2013. Parliament approved it on 6–7 February 2013.

A referendum was held on 16–17 March 2013. The new constitution was approved by approximately 94.5% of voters (turnout around 50%). It was gazetted on 22 May 2013 as the Constitution of Zimbabwe Amendment (No. 20) Act 2013. Certain provisions (Declaration of Rights, electoral chapters and others) came into immediate effect on publication day; the remainder became fully operational on 22 August 2013 following the harmonised elections.

== Chapters ==
The Constitution of Zimbabwe is organised into a preamble and 18 chapters. As originally enacted in 2013 it contained 345 sections. Following amendments, including the Constitution of Zimbabwe (Amendment) Act (No. 3), 2026, the authoritative consolidated text is the version published by Veritas Zimbabwe as at 20 June 2023, as subsequently amended.

=== Preamble ===
The Preamble acknowledges Zimbabwe’s colonial history, the liberation struggle, the attainment of independence in 1980, and the need for the people to "re-assert our rights and regain ownership of our land". It commits the nation to founding values and principles including democracy, good governance, the rule of law, fundamental rights and freedoms, national unity, gender equality, equitable distribution of resources, and national healing and reconciliation. It also recognises the role of veterans of the liberation struggle.

=== Chapter 1: Founding Provisions ===
This chapter establishes the basic character of the state and the supremacy of the Constitution. Section 1 declares Zimbabwe a unitary, democratic and sovereign republic. Section 2 affirms the supremacy of the Constitution: any law, practice, custom or conduct inconsistent with it is invalid to the extent of the inconsistency. Section 3 sets out the founding values and principles, including the rule of law, fundamental rights and freedoms, good governance (including multi-party democracy, regular free and fair elections, separation of powers and devolution), national unity, gender equality and recognition of 16 official languages. Sections 4–7 deal with national symbols (flag, anthem, public seal and coat of arms), the three tiers of government, official languages and the promotion of public awareness of the Constitution.

=== Chapter 2: National Objectives ===
Chapter 2 lists non-justiciable national objectives that must guide the State and all institutions and agencies of government. These include good governance and the combating of corruption, national unity, peace and stability, foreign policy based on sovereignty and non-interference, gender balance, protection of children, persons with disabilities, the elderly and veterans of the liberation struggle, equitable access to health care, food security, education, social welfare, environmental protection, preservation of traditional knowledge and culture, and the equitable distribution of land and other resources.

=== Chapter 3: Citizenship ===
This chapter defines citizenship by birth, descent, registration and naturalisation. It prohibits dual citizenship in certain circumstances but allows it in specified cases. It protects citizens from arbitrary deprivation of citizenship and provides for the acquisition of citizenship by children born in Zimbabwe to non-citizen parents under certain conditions. The chapter also establishes a Citizenship and Immigration Board.

=== Chapter 4: Declaration of Rights ===
One of the most progressive features of the Constitution, Chapter 4 contains a justiciable bill of rights that binds the State and every person. It includes civil and political rights (right to life, personal liberty, freedom from torture, slavery, forced labour, cruel or inhuman treatment, freedom of expression, assembly, association, movement, political rights, property rights and equality and non-discrimination) as well as socio-economic rights (health care, education, food, shelter and water) and environmental rights. Part 3 elaborates specific rights of women, children, the elderly, persons with disabilities and veterans of the liberation struggle. Section 85 provides for broad locus standi to enforce rights. Limitations on rights must be fair, reasonable, necessary and justifiable in an open and democratic society.

=== Chapter 5: The Executive ===
Executive authority derives from the people and is exercised through the President, Vice-Presidents and Cabinet. The President is Head of State, Head of Government and Commander-in-Chief of the Defence Forces.

Under the Constitution of Zimbabwe (Amendment) Act (No. 3), 2026, the President is elected by the members of Parliament in a joint sitting of the Senate and the National Assembly. A candidate must receive more than half of the valid votes cast. If no candidate achieves this, a run-off is held between the two candidates with the highest number of votes. The term of office of the President is seven years, and a person may serve a maximum of two terms. Transitional provisions provide that this term applies to the continuation in office of the current President (Mnangagwa). The chapter provides for the appointment and functions of Vice-Presidents, Cabinet, the Attorney-General and the National Security Council, as well as the prerogative of mercy.

=== Chapter 6: The Legislature ===
Parliament is bicameral, consisting of the National Assembly and the Senate.

The chapter sets out the composition, election and tenure of members, parliamentary privileges and the legislative process. It strengthens Parliament’s oversight role over the executive, including public finance and appointments. Special provisions exist for women’s quota seats (extended by Amendment No. 2) and youth quota. The Senate includes chiefs and persons with disabilities.

Under the Constitution of Zimbabwe (Amendment) Act (No. 3), 2026, the Senate consists of 90 members. In addition to existing categories of members, the President may appoint ten senators chosen for their professional skills and competencies after consultation with the National Assembly.

=== Chapter 7: Elections ===
This chapter establishes principles for democratic, free and fair elections. It provides for regular elections, voter registration, delimitation of constituencies and the resolution of electoral disputes. The chapter emphasises transparency, accountability and the right to vote. Under the 2026 Amendment, a new Delimitation Commission was established, and responsibility for voter registration and the maintenance of voters’ rolls was transferred to the Registrar-General. The Zimbabwe Electoral Commission continues to conduct elections in accordance with the Electoral Law.

=== Chapter 8: The Judiciary and Courts ===
The judiciary is independent and subject only to the Constitution and the law. It comprises the Constitutional Court, Supreme Court, High Court, Labour Court, Administrative Court and other courts.

Judges are appointed through a transparent process involving the Judicial Service Commission and public interviews (provisions amended by Amendment No. 1 to give the President greater discretion in certain senior appointments). Amendment No. 2 extended the retirement age for Constitutional Court and Supreme Court judges from 70 to 75 (or an elected five-year extension). The 2026 Amendment introduced changes to judicial appointments, giving the President greater discretion in certain senior appointments after consultation with the Judicial Service Commission, and made structural adjustments to the Supreme Court (including the role of the Judge President of the Supreme Court). The chapter includes provisions on judicial tenure, removal and the functions of the Judicial Service Commission.

=== Chapter 9: Principles of Public Administration and Public Service ===
This chapter sets out principles of good public administration, including efficiency, impartiality, accountability, transparency and merit-based recruitment. It applies to the civil service, security services, public entities and local government.

=== Chapter 10: Civil Service ===
The Civil Service is established as a professional, non-partisan body. The chapter provides for the Public Service Commission and principles governing appointments, promotions and discipline.

=== Chapter 11: Security Services ===
Security services (Defence Forces, Police Service, Intelligence Services, Prisons and Correctional Service) must be non-partisan, respect human rights and operate under civilian authority. The chapter prohibits their use for partisan political purposes.

=== Chapter 12: Independent Commissions Supporting Democracy ===
This chapter establishes and regulates independent commissions supporting democracy. Following the Constitution of Zimbabwe (Amendment) Act (No. 3), 2026, these are the Zimbabwe Electoral Commission, the Zimbabwe Human Rights Commission, the Zimbabwe Gender Commission and the Zimbabwe Media Commission. The National Peace and Reconciliation Commission was repealed by the 2026 Amendment.

=== Chapter 13: Institutions to Combat Corruption ===
The chapter creates the Zimbabwe Anti-Corruption Commission with powers to investigate and prosecute corruption. It imposes duties on public officers to declare assets.

=== Chapter 14: Provincial and Local Government ===
A key innovation of the 2013 Constitution is devolution. The chapter provides for provincial and metropolitan councils and local authorities as distinct tiers of government with devolved powers. It sets out principles of devolution, provincial governance structures and fiscal transfers.

=== Chapter 15: Traditional Leaders ===
Traditional leaders (chiefs, headmen and village heads) are recognised as an institution with roles in customary law, dispute resolution and community development. The chapter protects their independence from partisan politics.

=== Chapter 16: Agricultural Land ===
The chapter recognises historical injustices in land ownership and the need for land reform. It provides for the continued tenure of agricultural land by those lawfully occupying it and requires fair compensation in cases of acquisition for public purposes (subject to the land clause in the Declaration of Rights).

=== Chapter 17: Finance ===
This chapter deals with public finance, the national budget, taxation, loans, the Consolidated Revenue Fund, the Auditor-General and the Reserve Bank of Zimbabwe. It establishes principles of fiscal responsibility and parliamentary oversight of public funds.

=== Chapter 18: General and Supplementary Provisions ===
The concluding chapter contains general provisions including the amendment procedure (section 328 requires a two-thirds parliamentary majority; certain entrenched clauses also require a referendum), transitional arrangements and miscellaneous matters.

== Constitutional Amendments ==
=== Amendment No. 1 (2017) ===
Amendment No. 1 (2017) sought to alter the appointment process for the Chief Justice, Deputy Chief Justice and Judge President of the High Court, allowing the President greater discretion without mandatory public interviews or strict adherence to Judicial Service Commission shortlists. The Bill was passed by the National Assembly but received only 53 affirmative votes in the Senate on 1 August 2017—below the two-thirds majority required by section 328(5) of the Constitution. In Gonese & Anor v Parliament of Zimbabwe & Ors (CCZ 4/20, judgment delivered 31 March 2020), the Constitutional Court declared the Senate proceedings unconstitutional and invalidated the amendment. The declaration of invalidity was suspended for 180 days to allow the Senate to conduct a fresh vote in accordance with the Constitution. The Senate subsequently passed the Bill by the required two-thirds majority. A further challenge by Innocent Gonese, arguing that the Bill had lapsed upon the dissolution of Parliament in 2018, was dismissed by the Constitutional Court on 27 April 2023 (Gonese v The President of the Senate & Ors CCZ 12/23). The Court held that the Bill had already become law (Act 10 of 2017) before dissolution and that section 147 of the Constitution did not apply. The amendment therefore became law and remains in force.

=== Amendment No. 2 (2021) ===
Amendment No. 2 (2021), enacted as Act No. 2 of 2021 and gazetted on 7 May 2021, introduced several changes. It extended the retirement age for Constitutional Court and Supreme Court judges from 70 to 75 (or allowed them to elect to serve an additional five-year term), modified judicial appointment and promotion procedures (section 180), removed the "running mate" provision for vice-presidential candidates, extended the women's quota in Parliament and made technical adjustments. The tenure-extension clause enabled Chief Justice Luke Malaba (who turned 70 on 15 May 2021) to continue in office.

The amendment faced immediate legal challenge. In Kika v Minister of Justice & Ors and related matters, a three-judge High Court bench ruled on 15 May 2021 that the extension constituted an impermissible retroactive extension of tenure for incumbent judges under section 328(7) and violated equality and fair-trial rights. The court declared that Chief Justice Malaba had ceased to hold office at midnight on 14/15 May 2021. On appeal, however, the Constitutional Court (in Marx Mupungu v Minister of Justice, Legal & Parliamentary Affairs & 6 Others, judgment delivered 22 September 2021) set aside the High Court order. The Constitutional Court held that raising the retirement age did not amount to an alteration of term limits under section 328(7) and therefore did not require a referendum; it drew a distinction between fixed term limits and conditions of tenure such as retirement age. The ruling affirmed that Chief Justice Malaba’s tenure had been validly extended, and the amendment became and remains law.

=== Amendment No. 3 (2026) ===
On 7 July 2026, the Constitution of Zimbabwe (Amendment) Act, No. 6 of 2026, also known as CAB3, was enacted into law. Cabinet approved the draft Bill on 10 February 2026; it was gazetted on 16 February 2026, triggering the statutory public consultation period. The Bill was passed by the National Assembly on 18 June 2026 (216 votes to 42) and by the Senate on 24 June 2026 (75 votes to 4, with one absence). The National Assembly adopted the Senate’s amendments on 30 June 2026 (226 votes to 41). President Emmerson Mnangagwa assented to the Bill and signed it into law on 7 July 2026.

The Act amends the 2013 Constitution by replacing the direct popular election of the President with election by a joint sitting of the Senate and National Assembly; extending the terms of office of the President, Parliament and local authorities from five to seven years (with transitional provisions applying to current office-holders); increasing the size of the Senate from 80 to 90 members and empowering the President to appoint ten additional senators chosen for professional skills and competencies; establishing a new Zimbabwe Electoral Delimitation Commission; transferring responsibility for voter registration and the voters’ roll to the Registrar-General; making changes to judicial appointments and the structure of the superior courts; and repealing the National Peace and Reconciliation Commission. The proposed repeal of the Zimbabwe Gender Commission was removed during the parliamentary process and does not form part of the enacted Act.

The legislation generated intense national debate. Supporters argued that the changes would promote long-term political stability and more efficient governance. Critics, including opposition parties, civil society organisations and constitutional analysts, contended that the reforms erode the democratic protections of the 2013 Constitution, weaken institutional checks and balances, and reduce direct public participation in the selection of the President.
