= Mutoko North =

- Constituency for the National Assembly of Zimbabwe
- Province: Mashonaland East
- Region: Mutoko District

Current constituency
- Number of members: 1
- Party: ZANU–PF
- Member: Caleb Makwiranzou

Mutoko North is a constituency represented in the National Assembly of the Parliament of Zimbabwe, located in Mutoko District in Mashonaland East Province. Its current MP since the 2023 election is Caleb Makwiranzou of ZANU–PF.

== History ==
In the 2013 election, Mabel Chinomona of ZANU–PF was elected to the seat, and became deputy speaker of the National Assembly. She was reelected in the 2018 election, but soon vacated the seat when she was named president of the Senate of Zimbabwe. ZANU–PF's Rambidzai Nyabote won the seat in a 24 November 2018 by-election. In the 2023 election, Caleb Makwiranzou of ZANU–PF was elected to the seat.

== Members ==
Election	Name	Party
2018	Mabel Chinomona	ZANU–PF
2018 by-election	Rambidzai Nyabote	ZANU–PF
2023	Caleb Makwiranzou	ZANU–PF

== See also ==
- List of Zimbabwean parliamentary constituencies
