= List of presidents of the Senate of Zimbabwe =

The President of the Senate of Zimbabwe is the presiding officer of the Senate, the upper house of the Parliament of Zimbabwe. The office has its roots in the colonial and post-UDI periods, when the first President of the Senate of Rhodesia served from 1970 following the establishment of a bicameral Parliament. The role continued through the Zimbabwe-Rhodesia period and was retained in the Parliament of Zimbabwe after independence in 1980.

A President of the Senate is elected by secret ballot at the first sitting of the Senate after a general election (and whenever a vacancy arises). The election is supervised by the Zimbabwe Electoral Commission in accordance with the Standing Orders. Although Presidents of the Senate have generally been drawn from the majority party, the office is expected to be exercised with impartiality. Upon election, the President of the Senate is required to resign any party positions and to act independently when presiding. The President of the Senate ceases to be a Senator upon election and does not participate in debates except to exercise a casting vote in the event of a tie.

The incumbent President of the Senate is Mabel Chinomona, who was first elected on 11 September 2018 and has been re-elected in subsequent parliaments.

== List of presidents ==
=== Rhodesia (1970–1979) ===
The Parliament of Rhodesia was unicameral from 1965 to 1970. The Senate was introduced as the upper house of the bicameral Parliament in 1970.

No.	Portrait	President	Tenure	Party	Notes
1		Jack William Pithey	1970 – 1 November 1978	Rhodesian Front	
-		John Richard Strong; Acting	December 1978 – 29 May 1979	Rhodesian Front	

=== Zimbabwe Rhodesia (1979) and Southern Rhodesia (1979–1980) ===
No.	Portrait	President	Tenure	Party	Notes
1		George Holland Hartley	1979	Rhodesian Front	

=== Zimbabwe (1980-present) ===
No.	Portrait	President	Tenure	Party	Notes
1		Nolan Makombe	1980 - 1990	ZANU–PF	
Senate abolished 1990 - 2005
2		Edna Madzongwe	30 November 2005 - 11 September 2018	ZANU–PF	
3		Mabel Chinomona	11 September 2018 - present	ZANU–PF	

== See also ==
- Senate of Rhodesia
