= Parliament of Zimbabwe =

Bicameral legislature of Zimbabwe

15 other official names
- - Shona: Paramende
  - Ndebele: Idale Lephalamende
  - Chewa: Nyumba Ya Malamulo
  - Chibarwe: Pharamende
  - Kalanga: Phalamente
  - Koisan: Ha Palamende Ua Hha N Tcura
  - Nambya: I Palamende
  - Ndau: Palamendi
  - Shangani: Phalamente
  - Sesotho: Palamente
  - Tonga: Palyamenti
  - Tswana: Palamente
  - Venda: Phalamennde
  - Xhosa: iPalamente
- 10th Parliament of Zimbabwe
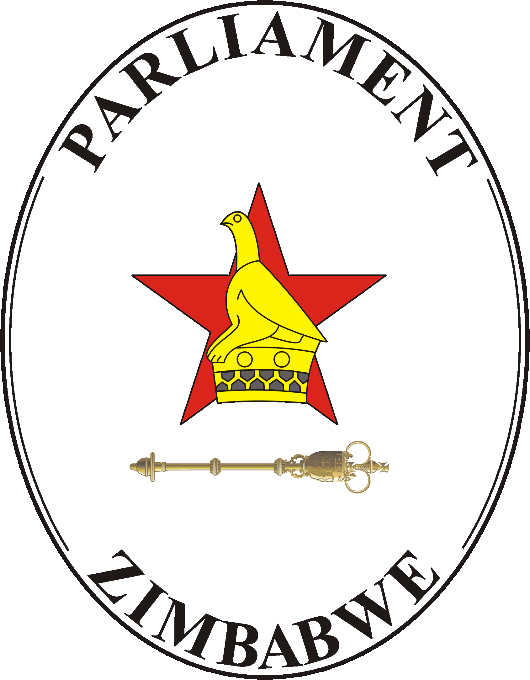

Type
- Type: Bicameral
- Houses: Senate; National Assembly
- Term limits: None

History
- Founded: 18 April 1980; 46 years ago
- Preceded by: Parliament of Rhodesia
- New session started: 3 October 2023

Leadership
- Head of Parliament (Speaker of the National Assembly): Jacob Mudenda, ZANU-PF since 22 August 2013
- Deputy Head of Parliament (President of the Senate): Mabel Chinomona, ZANU-PF since 11 September 2018
- Clerk: Kennedy Mugove Chokuda

Structure
- Seats: 370 voting members; 90 senators; 280 members; 2 non-voting members (Speaker & President)
- Senate political groups: Provincial Senators (60) ZANU–PF (33) CCC (27) Chiefs (18) Chiefs (18) Persons with disabilities (2) Persons with disabilities (2) Presidential appointees (10) Presidential appointees (10) Vacant (0) Vacant (0) Presiding officer (1) President (1)
- National Assembly political groups: Government (194) ZANU-PF (194) Opposition (86) CCC (86) Vacant seats (0) Vacant (0) Presiding officer (1) Speaker (1)
- Length of term: Seven years

Elections
- Senate voting system: Parallel voting
- Last Senate election: 23 August 2023
- Last National Assembly election: 23 August 2023
- Next Senate election: No later than 5 August 2030
- Next National Assembly election: No later than 5 August 2030
- Redistricting: Zimbabwe Electoral Commission, in consultation with the President and Parliament

Meeting place
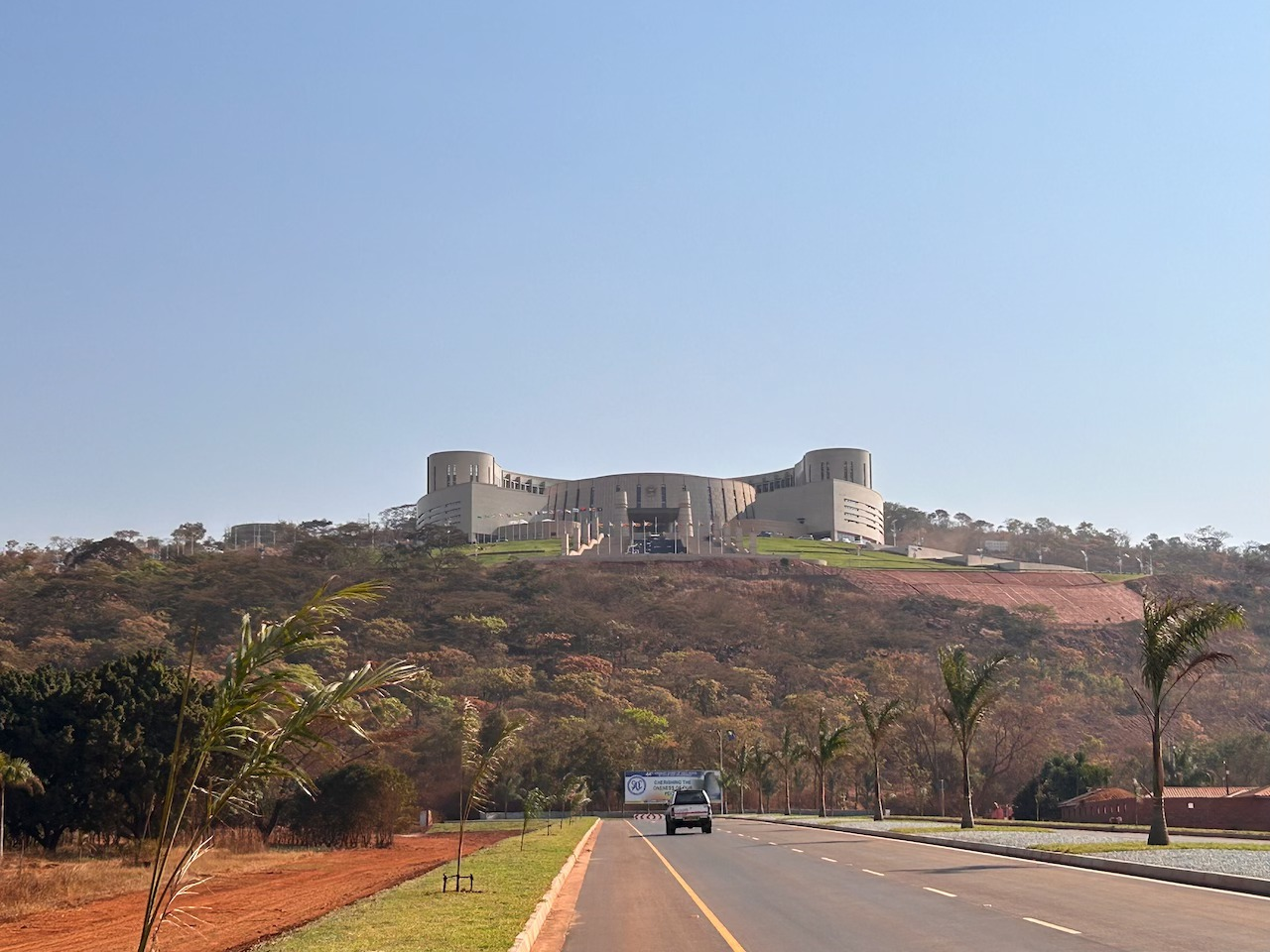
- New Zimbabwe Parliament Building; Mount Hampden; Zimbabwe

Website
- parlzim.gov.zw

Constitution
- Constitution of Zimbabwe

The Parliament of Zimbabwe is the bicameral legislature of Zimbabwe composed of the Senate and the National Assembly. The Senate is the upper house, and consists of 90 members, 60 of whom are elected by proportional representation from ten six-member constituencies corresponding to the country's provinces. Of the remaining 30 seats, 18 are reserved for chiefs, and two for people with disabilities, while 10 are appointed directly by the President. The National Assembly is the lower house, and consists of 280 members. Of these, 210 are elected from single-member constituencies. The remaining 70 seats are reserved women's and youth quotas: 60 for women; 10 for youth. These are elected by proportional representation from ten six-member and one-member constituencies respectively, corresponding to the country's provinces.

Formerly based at Parliament House, Harare, the parliament moved to the New Zimbabwe Parliament Building in October 2023. The new building has 650 seats, which will allow the parliament to expand.

== History ==
Historically, the first legislature in what is now Zimbabwe was the Southern Rhodesian Legislative Council, established in 1898 in what was then the British South Africa Company territory of Southern Rhodesia. Company rule in Rhodesia ended in 1923 when the territory became a self-governing colony, and the Legislative Council was replaced by the Southern Rhodesian Legislative Assembly. In 1970, five years after the colony's Unilateral Declaration of Independence, Rhodesia replaced the unicameral Legislative Assembly with a bicameral Parliament, consisting of a Senate and House of Assembly. This parliamentary structure was retained upon Zimbabwe's independence in 1980. Per the constitution produced by Lancaster House Agreement in 1979, the Senate was composed of 40 seats and the House of Assembly was composed of 100, with ten Senate seats and 20 seats in the House of Assembly reserved for white Zimbabweans. The white-reserved seats were abolished in 1987, and a constitutional amendment in 1989 abolished the Senate and expanded the House of Assembly to 120 seats. In 2005, the Senate was reintroduced and the House of Assembly expanded. The House of Assembly was expanded once again in 2007 to 210 seats. The present parliamentary structure has been in place since the adoption of a new constitution in 2013.

The Senate is presided over by its President, who is not a sitting Senator, who is assisted by a Deputy President. The National Assembly is presided over by a Speaker, who is not a Member of Parliament. The Speaker is assisted by a Deputy Speaker. The 10th Parliament of Zimbabwe is the current Parliament since the 2023 general election. The Zimbabwe African National Union – Patriotic Front, the ruling party since Zimbabwe's independence in 1980, holds majorities in both chambers of Parliament. The Citizens Coalition for Change holds most of the remaining seats, and forms the opposition.

== See also ==
- Elections in Zimbabwe
- Politics of Zimbabwe
