= David Anthony Chimhini =

Zimbabwean politician and human rights activist

The Honourable David Anthony Chimhini Sen.

Member of Parliament for Mutasa North
- In office 2008–2013

Senator for Manicaland Province
- In office 2015–2018

Personal details
- Born: 10 June 1950 (age 76) Mutasa, Manicaland Province, Zimbabwe
- Citizenship: Zimbabwean
- Party: Movement for Democratic Change – Tsvangirai
- Education: Kutama College; University of Zimbabwe; Institute of Social Studies
- Occupation: Politician, Human rights activist

David Anthony Chimhini (born 10 June 1950), is a Zimbabwean politician, educator, human rights activist and trade unionist who served as the Member of Parliament for Mutasa North between 2008 and 2013.

== Early life and education ==
Chimhini attended Kutama Teachers’ College, before obtaining Certificate in Education University of Zimbabwe. He later earned a Master’s degree in Studies from the Institute of Social Studies, Netherlands.

== Career ==
Chimhini worked as both a teacher and headmaster in the Manicaland and Mashonaland West provinces in the 1970s, He is a founding member of the National Constitutional Assembly (NCA) in 1997 along with Morgan Tsvangirai, Mike Auret, David Coltart, Tendai Biti, Thoko Matshe, Lovemore Madhuku, Welshman Ncube, Priscilla Misihairambwi, Brian Kagoro and others.

Chimhini participated in the formation of the Movement for Democratic Change (MDC) in the late 1990. He also founded the Zimbabwe Civic Education Trust (ZIMCET), an organisation focused on peacebuilding, conflict resolution, human rights education and civic awareness, where he served as its founding Executive Director.

In 2008, Chimhini contested and won the Mutasa North parliamentary seat as an MDC candidate, succeeding Major-General Mike Nyambuya of ZANU–PF who he defeated in the election. He was later sworn in as a Senator for Manicaland Province in June 2015.
