= List of Zimbabwean presidential election results by province =

This table lists Zimbabwe presidential election results by province.

== Legend ==
Abbreviation	Party
ZANU–PF	Zimbabwe African National Union – Patriotic Front
MDC	Movement for Democratic Change
MDC–T	Movement for Democratic Change – Tsvangirai
MDC A	Movement for Democratic Change Alliance
CCC	Citizens Coalition for Change

== Chronological table of results ==
Province	1990	1996	2002	2008	2013	2018	2023
Bulawayo	ZANU–PF	ZANU–PF	MDC	MDC–T	MDC–T	MDC A	CCC
Harare	ZANU–PF	ZANU–PF	MDC	MDC–T	MDC–T	MDC A	CCC
Manicaland	ZANU–PF	ZANU–PF	ZANU–PF	MDC–T	ZANU–PF	MDC A	ZANU–PF
Mashonaland Central	ZANU–PF	ZANU–PF	ZANU–PF	ZANU–PF	ZANU–PF	ZANU–PF	ZANU–PF
Mashonaland East	ZANU–PF	ZANU–PF	ZANU–PF	ZANU–PF	ZANU–PF	ZANU–PF	ZANU–PF
Mashonaland West	ZANU–PF	ZANU–PF	ZANU–PF	ZANU–PF	ZANU–PF	ZANU–PF	ZANU–PF
Masvingo	ZANU–PF	ZANU–PF	ZANU–PF	ZANU–PF	ZANU–PF	ZANU–PF	ZANU–PF
Matabeleland North	ZANU–PF	ZANU–PF	MDC	MDC–T	MDC–T	MDC A	CCC
Matabeleland South	ZANU–PF	ZANU–PF	MDC	ZANU–PF	ZANU–PF	ZANU–PF	ZANU–PF
Midlands	ZANU–PF	ZANU–PF	ZANU–PF	ZANU–PF	ZANU–PF	ZANU–PF	ZANU–PF

== See also ==
- Elections in Zimbabwe
