= Brian Kagoro =

Zimbabwean constitutional Lawyer and Human Rights Advocate

- Born: Brian Bright Tamuka Kagoro
- Citizenship: Zimbabwean
- Education: LLB (Hons) University of Zimbabwe, LLM University of Warwick
- Occupations: Constitutional lawyer; Human rights advocate; Public intellectual
- Known for: Pan-Africanism; Constitutional reform; transitional justice
- Website: briantamukakagoro.com

Brian Kagoro is a Zimbabwean Pan-Africanist, constitutional lawyer, human rights advocate, and public intellectual. He is known for his work on constitutional reform, reparation and transitional justice, and has held senior leadership positions at Open Society Foundations (OSF), UNDP and ActionAid International. Kagoro was a Yale Maurice R. Greenberg World Fellow in 2003.

== Early life and education ==
Kagoro was born in a farming district near Harare, to parents he described as "graduates and professionals" who were "neither rich, nor poor," and grew up between Harare and Bulawayo in a family engaged in the liberation struggle during Zimbabwe War of Independence, which fundamentally shaped his upbringing. He completed his tertiary education in Harare before studying law at the University of Zimbabwe, earning an LLB (Hons), and later obtained an LLM in International Economic Relations and Constitutional Law from the University of Warwick in mid-1990s.

== Career ==
Kagoro participated in Zimbabwean constitutional reform efforts, the formation of Crisis in Zimbabwe Coalition, and the establishment of the National Constitutional Assembly (NCA) alongside David Anthony Chimhini and Lovemore Madhuku. He held leadership positions at the Open Society Foundations (OSF), where he served as Managing Director of Programmes and Africa Geo Lead after directing the organisation's Justice and Intersectionality portfolio, and held positions with ActionAid International, the United Nations Development Programme (UNDP). He has undertaken consultancy assignments for the African Union Commission, New Partnership for Africa's Development, and the United Nations Economic Commission for Africa.

Kagoro has served on the boards of several civil society organisations, including Zimbabwe Lawyers for Human Rights and Amani Trust. He has contributed publicly to debates on Climate change, Economic justice, Governance, reparation, and transitional justice discourses. In 2020, he participated in the Centre for Human Rights, University of Pretoria, Africa Rights Talk series. He contributes opinion essays to This Is Africa on Pan-Africanism, sanctions policy, and governance.

== 2026 deportation from Kenya ==
On 22 February 2026, Kenyan authorities deported Kagoro after alleging that he had coordinated foreign-funded efforts to remobilise the 2024 protests. Kagoro denied the allegations, stating that he had travelled to Kenya for a family function and to participate in a conference on critical minerals and artificial intelligence.
