= Zimbabwe and the World Bank =

Official flag of The Republic of Zimbabwe

The Republic of Zimbabwe (formerly South Rhodesia (1911-1964, 1979-1980), Rhodesia (1964-1979), and Zimbabwe Rhodesia (1979)) is a landlocked country locked in the southern region of Africa. It shares borders with The Republic of South Africa, Botswana, Zambia, and Mozambique. Upon gaining independence in 1980, the new regime (under Robert Mugabe), sought to replace many of the institutions established by the previous white rule. Many of the new regime's actions, like land reform and involvement in The Democratic Republic of the Congo's civil war, have been the source of the state's economic failure.

The World Bank Group currently estimates that extreme poverty has risen from 29% to 34% from 2018-2019 (4.7 million to 5.7 million). The production of food was weakened by an El Niño-induced drought, as well as Cyclone Idai affecting three sectors that accounted for 30% of Zimbabwe's agricultural production. As a result, the World Bank estimates that one out of every ten rural households are going without food for an entire day. Since 2018, the production of minerals in Zimbabwe has decreased by 27%, and agriculture has decreased by approximately 50%. Other issues such as shortages in foreign currency, fuel, and electricity have contributed to the country's economic failure.

Graph of the inflation rate of Zimbabwe's bond currencies for 2018 to 2019.

Inflation is also a large issue for Zimbabwe, reaching 230% in July 2019 from 5.4% in September of 2018. Food prices have risen 319% and non-food inflation has reached 194% since 2018. Current World Bank Group and International Monetary Fund involvement is done in hope that the government can adjust their fiscal practices in order to alleviate the cost its citizens are paying. However, the World Bank fears that political and social pressure will exacerbate Zimbabwe's macroeconomic instability.

== World Bank involvement ==
Between 1980 and 2000, the World Bank Group has totaled up to $1.6 billion in assistance to Zimbabwe. Due to non-payment of arrears, lending was suspended after 2000, but the World Bank has remained involved using non-lending instruments and trust funds. Zimbabwe's debt to the World Bank currently values at $1.5 billion, and $1.3 billion of that is debt in arrears.

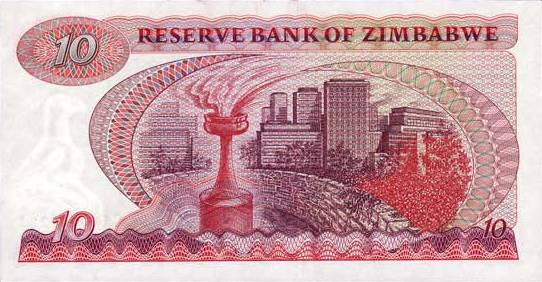
The front of the paper Zimbabwe dollar, which circulated from 1980 and 1982.

The World Bank has created several trust funds for Zimbabwe, including: The Zimbabwe Reconstruction Fund (ZIMREF), the Zimbabwe Analytical Multi-Donor Trust Fund, the Multi-Donor Health Results Innovation Trust Fund-Global Financing Facility (HIRTF-GFF), the State and Peace-Building Fund, the Global Environmental Facility Trust Fund, and Cooperation in International Water.

In addition to these trust funds, the IDA allocated $72 million for a crisis project in response to Cyclone Idai. The Global Financing Facility also supports results-based financing in rural and urban areas to improve the health sector, as well as maternal and child health in Zimbabwe.

== Current projects ==
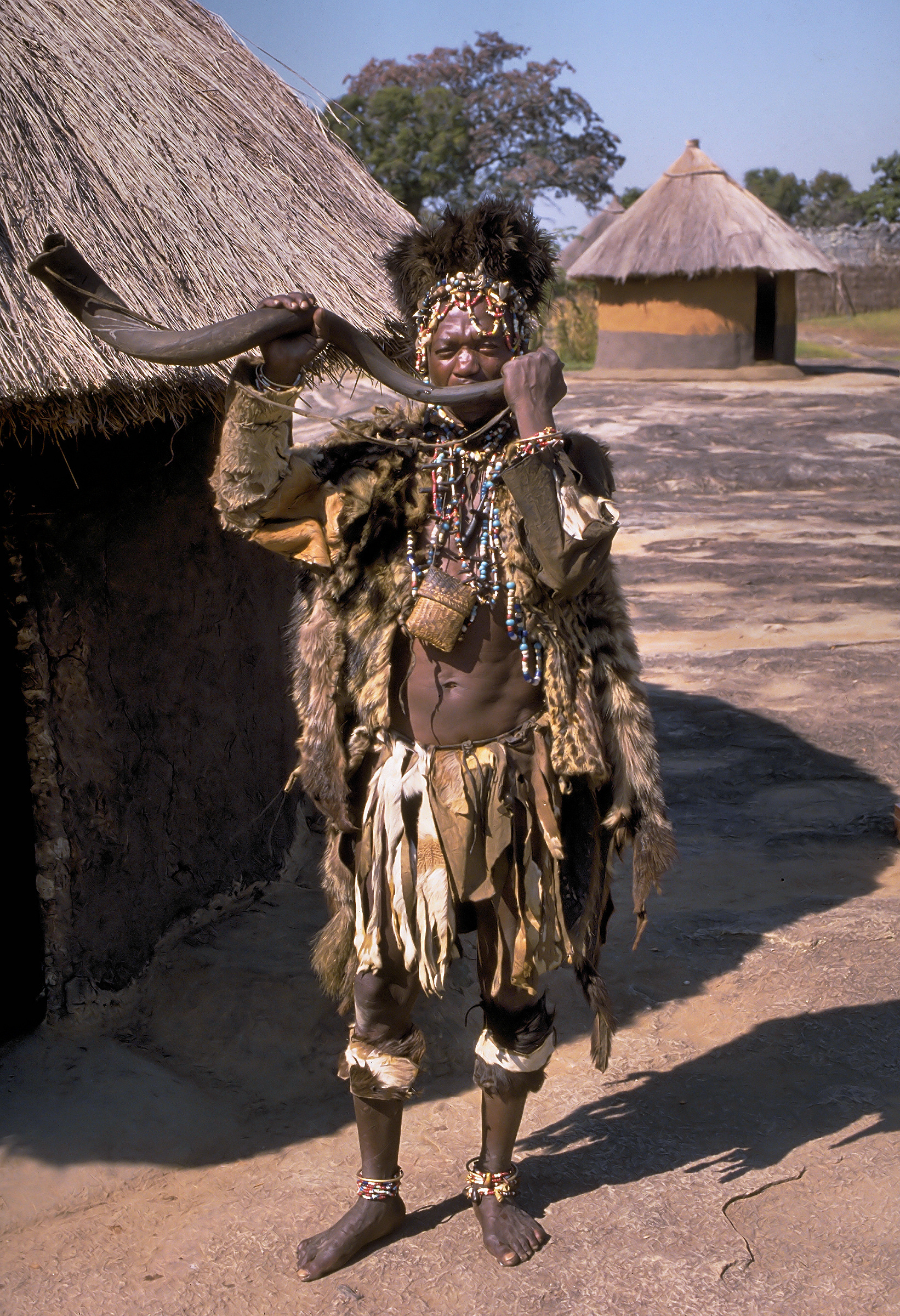
Indigenous Shona people of Great Zimbabwe.

The result of the suspension of international lending to Zimbabwe is the creation of trust funds by the World Bank. This is done to maintain support for the vast economic and social difficulties the country faces. The international lending picture since 2015, updated by the World Bank Group in 2019, shows that Zimbabwe received $0 in 2015, $53 million in 2016, $2 million in 2017, $5 million in 2018, and $3 million in 2019. The current projects being conducted in Zimbabwe began in 2015-2016, and were mainly done through the Zimbabwe Reconstruction Fund (ZIMREF). These projects include:

1. A technical assistance program ($1.3 million) supports the program-based budgeting across all central government ministries. The TA also supports the Education and Health sectors.
2. A capital budgets TA ($4.3 million) supports the improvement of state-owned enterprise management, public investment planning and management, and the review of the transport sector supporting aviation and road tolling reforms.
3. Poverty monitoring and evaluation technical assistance ($1.9 million) capacity building with the Poverty Income Consumption and Expenditure Survey.
4. Public Procurement Modernization Project ($2 million) supports the alignment of public legislation and constitutional law.
5. Public Financial Management Enhancement Project ($10 million) to improve financial reporting, internal controls, and fiscal transparency.
6. National Water Project ($10 million) to improve access and quality of water and sanitation services in seven small town growth centers; improve water resources planning.
7. Financial Sector and Investment Policy TA ($3.2 million) to improve the business climate for the private sector, especially for micro enterprises, SMEs, and the agricultural sector.
8. A Climate Change TA ($1.5 million) to strengthen the capacity of the government to integrate climate change into investment planning in forestry, agriculture, and the water sector.

== Improvements ==
Several improvements have been recorded by the World Bank as a result of trust fund efforts. As of June 2019, 800,000 women have received professional health care, and 817,000 and a total of 911,677 children have completed their immunizations due to the projects in the health sector. Regular quality and care assessments take place, and they are averaging a score of 85% when they were previously seeing results in the 75% range. There has also been a 12% increase in successful births and postnatal care.

The World Bank's effort in implementing fiscal practice workshops for government ministries has extended from three ministries to 22 ministries and all local authorities necessary. Though the Water Project, water availability and quality has improved in Zimunya, Lupane, and Guruve. Once everything is complete, the World Bank estimates that 17,000 people will have benefitted from the project.

Other areas of improvement would include: The education component (awaiting the finalization of the Teaching Professions Bill); the corporate sector (enhancing corporate transparency and accountability); poverty monitoring (updated and refined the Poverty Income Consumption and Expenditure Survey; creating data systems that can process micro-data); and the Procurement Project (Modernization of procurement laws and the development of government procurement strategies). The Procurement Project was set in motion on June 3, 2019 and reporting has been enhanced; there has also been improved coverage of internal audit in Central Government with 87% of the audit work plan completed.
