= Mike Nyambuya =

Zimbabwean politician and military officer

The Honourable Mike Nyambuya Sen.

Deputy President of the Senate of Zimbabwe
- Incumbent
- Assumed office 11 September 2018
- President: Emmerson Mnangagwa
- Senate President: Mabel Chinomona

Senator for Manicaland
- Incumbent
- Assumed office 22 August 2013
- President: Robert Mugabe; Emmerson Mnangagwa

Member of Parliament for Mutasa North
- In office 31 March 2005 – 28 March 2008
- President: Robert Mugabe
- Preceded by: New constituency
- Succeeded by: David Antony Chimhini

Provincial Governor of Manicaland
- In office 1 December 2003 – 12 April 2005
- President: Robert Mugabe
- Preceded by: Oppah Muchinguri
- Succeeded by: Tinaye Chigudu

Personal details
- Born: 23 July 1955 (age 71)
- Party: ZANU-PF

Michael Rueben Nyambuya (born 23 July 1955) is a Zimbabwean politician and military officer who has served as Governor of Manicaland and as Minister of Energy and Power Development.

== Military career ==
Mike Nyambuya served in the Zimbabwean armed forces during the Second Congo War, and was in command of Zimbabwean forces defending N'Djili Airfield during Operation Kitona.

== Political career ==
Nyambuya is a former army general. He served as Provincial Governor of Manicaland before being appointed as Minister of Energy and Power Development in mid-April 2005, following the March 2005 parliamentary election. He was placed on the United States sanctions list in 2005.

He was nominated as ZANU-PF's candidate for the House of Assembly seat from Mutasa North, a constituency in Manicaland, in the March 2008 parliamentary election. He was defeated in this election by David Anthony Chimhini, the candidate of the Movement for Democratic Change-Tsvangirai, receiving 4882 against 9396 for Chimhini.

The Herald reported on 3 January 2009 that Nyambuya had been dismissed from the Cabinet earlier in the week, along with 11 other ministers, because he no longer held any seat in Parliament.
