= Elections in Zimbabwe =

The Zimbabwe government consists of an elected head of state, the president, and a legislature. The presidential term lasts for 5 years, and is elected by majority, with a second round if no candidate receives a majority in the first round. The Parliament is bicameral, consisting of the House of Assembly and Senate. Following the 2013 constitution, the House of Assembly has 270 members. 210 are elected for five-year terms by single-member constituencies. Furthermore, the constitution specifies that for the two first parliaments, there are 60 additional seats reserved for women, 6 seats per province, which are filled based on the votes for in the single-member constituencies, using party-list proportional representation, distributed using the largest remainder method and the hare quota. The Senate has 80 members: 60 are elected for five-year terms in 6-member constituencies representing one of the 10 provinces, elected based on the votes in the lower house election, using party-list proportional representation, distributed using the hare quota. Additionally the senate consists of 2 seats for each non-metropolitan district of Zimbabwe elected by each provincial assembly of chiefs using SNTV, 1 seat each for the president and deputy president of the National Council of Chiefs and 1 male and 1 female seat for people with disabilities elected on separate ballots using FPTP by an electoral college designated by the National Disability Board.

Zimbabwe is a one party dominant state, the dominant party being the Zimbabwe African National Union - Patriotic Front. Opposition parties are permitted, including the MDC Alliance led by Nelson Chamisa and the MDC–T led by Thokozani Khuphe, both formations of the original Movement for Democratic Change created in 1999. Recent elections (March 2008) have witnessed former ruling party finance minister Simba Makoni standing as an independent presidential candidate.

== Latest elections ==
Party	Votes	%	Seats			
Party	Votes	%	Common	Women	Youth	Total
ZANU–PF	2,515,607	56.18	137	33	7	177
Citizens Coalition for Change	1,856,393	41.46	73	27	3	103
Movement for Democratic Change – Tsvangirai	15,307	0.34	0	0	0	0
Zimbabwe African People's Union	10,857	0.24	0	0	0	0
United Zimbabwe Alliance	4,937	0.11	0	0	0	0
National Constitutional Assembly	2,462	0.05	0	0	0	0
Democratic Opposition Party	2,105	0.05	0	0	0	0
FreeZim Congress	1,926	0.04	0	0	0	0
Democratic Union of Zimbabwe	1,881	0.04	0	0	0	0
Mthwakazi Republic Party	1,641	0.04	0	0	0	0
Zimbabwe National Revival Party	1,271	0.03	0	0	0	0
Zimbabwe African National Congress	628	0.01	0	0	0	0
United African National Council	574	0.01	0	0	0	0
Zimbabwe Coalition for Peace and Development Party	434	0.01	0	0	0	0
National People’s Congress	297	0.01	0	0	0	0
Economic Freedom Fighters	286	0.01	0	0	0	0
United Freedom Party	187	0.00	0	0	0	0
Freedom Alliance	148	0.00	0	0	0	0
Independents	60,445	1.35	0	0	0	0
Total	4,477,386	100.00	210	60	10	280

== Referendums ==
On 12–13 February 2000, there was a constitutional referendum for increasing the powers of the president. These powers were to permit the government to confiscate White-owned land without compensation for the purpose of redistribution to Black farmers, and to give government officials immunity from prosecution.

- "Yes" Votes 45.32%
- "No" Votes 54.68%

== See also ==
- List of Zimbabwean presidential election results by province
- Electoral calendar
- Electoral system
- Zimbabwe Electoral Commission
