= Kisinoti Mukwazhe =

Zimbabwean politician (died 2019)

Kisinoti Munodei Mukwazhe (also spelled Kisnot Mukwazhi) (died 17 November 2019) was president of the Zimbabwe Development Party and was a presidential candidate for the 2013 Zimbabwean general election.
