= Zimunya =

Paramount Chiefdom in Manicaland Province, Zimbabwe

Coordinates: 19.101°S 32.623°E

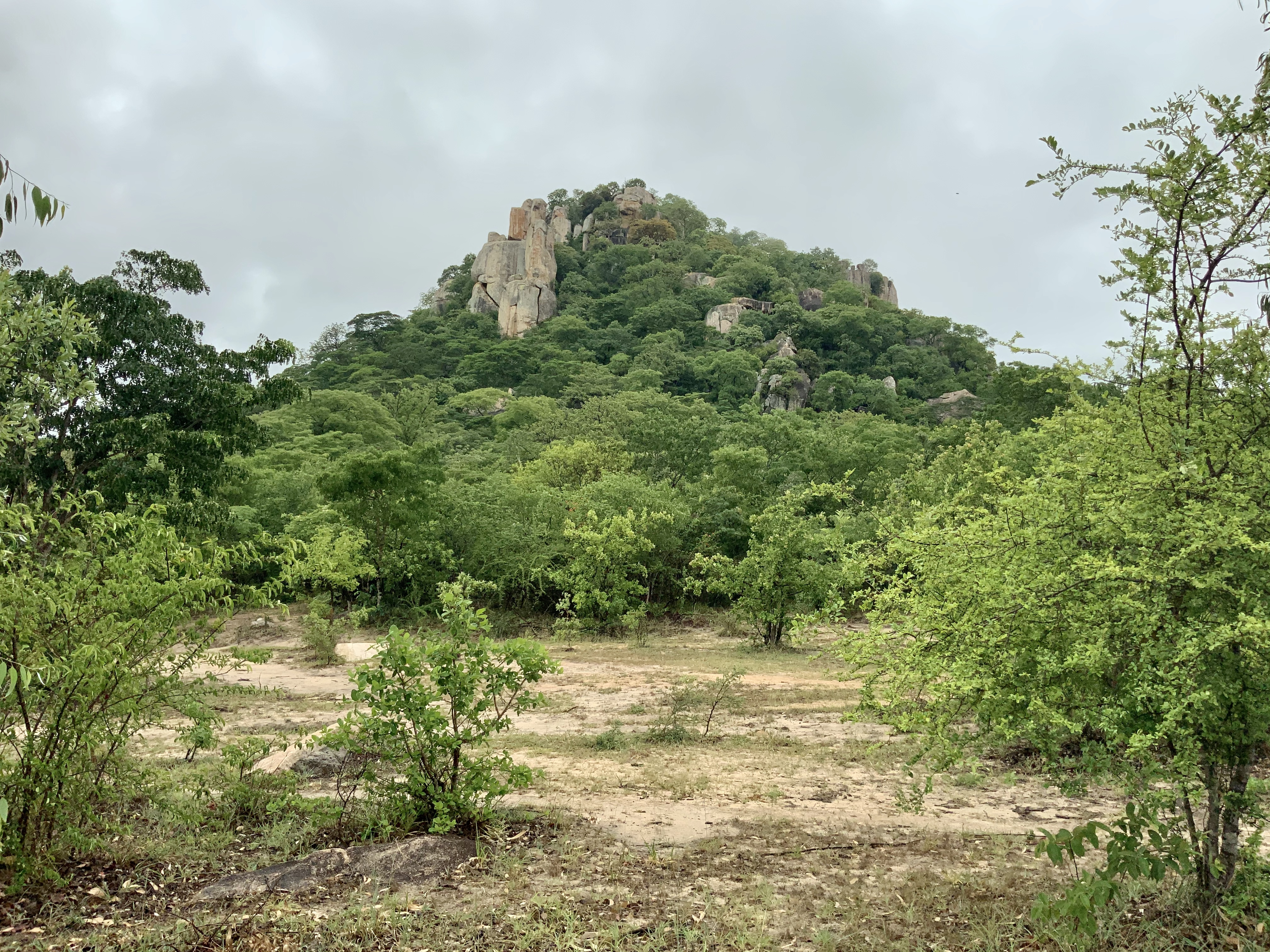
Photograph by R. Zimunya, 2020

Zimunya (alternatively also referred to as Zimunya Tribal Trust Land or Zimunya Reserve or Zimunya communal lands), also referred to by the Jindwi people of Zimunya as "Jindwi" (also referenced in other texts as "Jindui" or "Jindwe"), is a Paramount Chiefdom in Manicaland Province, Zimbabwe under Chief Zimunya.

== Geographical location ==
Zimunya stretches southward from the present day City of Mutare, past the Bvumba mountain range, through Burma Valley, Chitakatira, Dowa, Chitaka, Chitakatira, Rowa, Chinyauhwera, Munyarari, Mambwere, Mpudzi, Chimhenga, Chipendeke, Bwizi, Chitora, Gutaurare, Muromo, Masasi, Mukwada, Kusena, Chakohwa, Chiswingi, Chiadzwa, Mufusire heading southward to Wengezi, reaching towards Birchenough Bridge, sharing the border with Mocambique in the East, waBocha People under Chief Marange, waUngwe People under Chief Makoni, as well as the waHera in the west, the Ndau People to the south, with the Manyika People under Chief Mutasa to the north of Mutare. (Zimunya's pre-colonial eastern boundaries stretched into modern day Mocambique).

Approximately 15 km south of Mutare lies Zimunya Town within the Zimunya communal lands. This community is surrounded by the Bvumba Mountain range (Bvumba Mountains) and Fern Valley communities.

== Population ==
The indigenous population continues to live on farms and communal land along the length and breath of the Chiefdom, characterised by well watered mountain ranges, valleys, rivers, dams and forests, rich in flora growing in the richest soils in the region.

== Languages ==
The language spoken by the aJindwi is called chiJindwi (also referred to as CiJindwi in certain texts). chiJindwi continues to be spoken today, despite ill-conceived attempts by the then colonial regime (through Missionaries) to replace it with the language of chiManyika as well as to re-identify the indigenous people with a new identity the oppressors originated, crafted and called "Shona", as quoted by B.H. Barnes in the book 'The progress of the new Shona orthography', Native Affairs Department Annual, No. 12 (1934), referenced in "The Creation of Tribalism in Southern Africa".

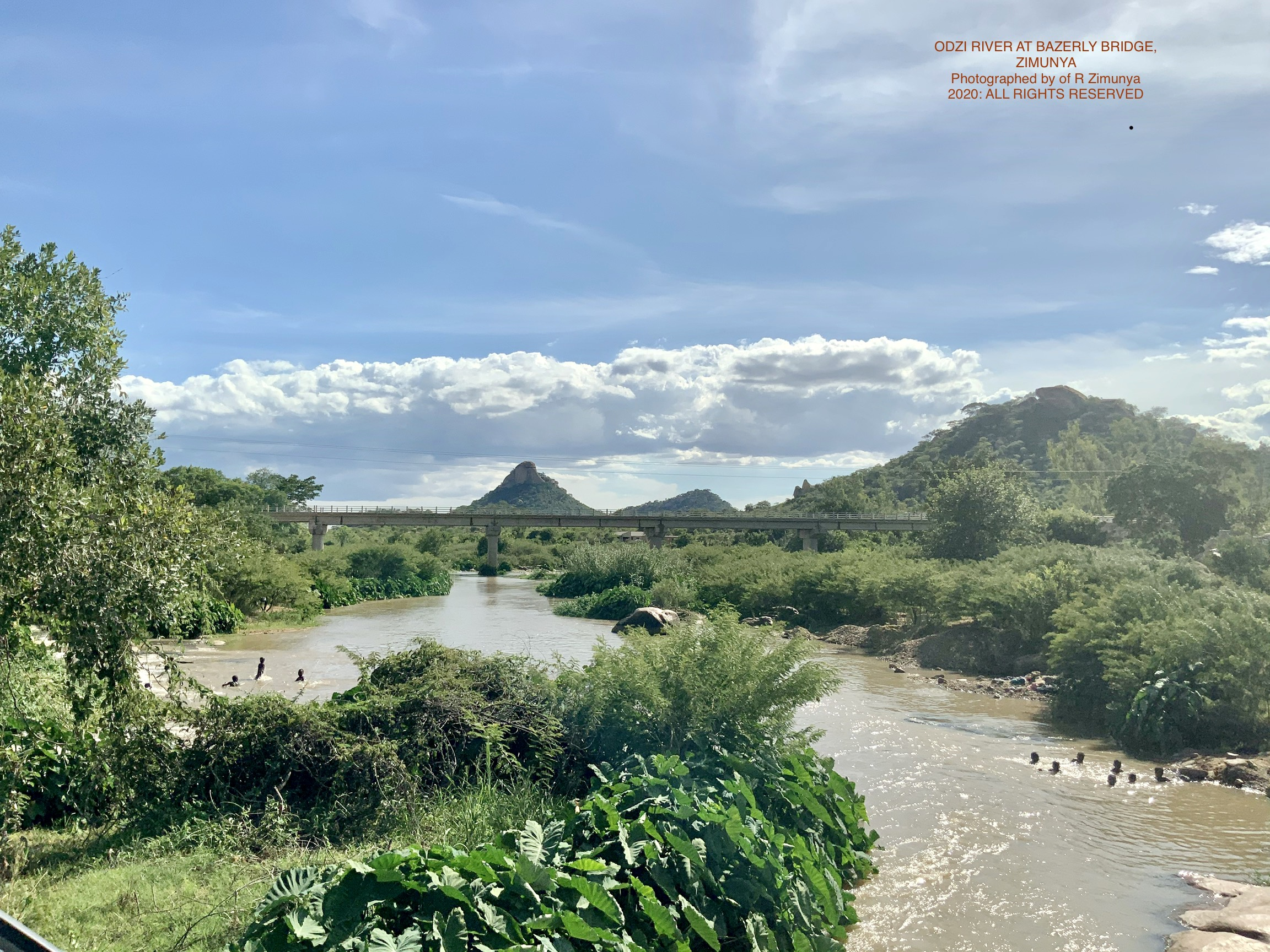
Photograph of Odzi River by R. Zimunya, 2020
