= Caleb Makwiranzou =

Zimbabwean politician

The Hon. Caleb Makwiranzou MP

Deputy Minister of Mines and Mining Development responsible for Oil and Gas Research including other Strategic Minerals Exploration
- Incumbent
- Assumed office 13 February 2025
- President: Emmerson Mnangagwa
- Minister: Winston Chitando
- Preceded by: New function in Ministry

Member of Parliament for Mutoko North
- Incumbent
- Assumed office 4 September 2023
- President: Emmerson Mnangagwa
- Preceded by: Rambidzai Nyabote
- Constituency: Mutoko North
- Majority: 12,101 (60.0%)

Personal details
- Born: 1 April 1953 (age 73) Mutoko
- Party: ZANU-PF

Caleb Makwiranzou is a Zimbabwean politician, serving as the Member of Parliament for Mutoko North and current Deputy Minister of Mines and Mining Development responsible for Oil and Gas Research including other Strategic Minerals Exploration. He was elected to the National Assembly during the 2023 Zimbabwean general election.
