= 2030 Zimbabwean parliamentary election =

Upcoming election

- On or before 5 August 2030
- National Assembly
- All 280 seats in the National Assembly; 141 seats needed for a majority
Party	Leader	Last election
ZANU–PF	Emmerson Mnangagwa	177
CCC	Disputed	103
- Senate
- 60 of the 90 seats in the Senate; 46 seats needed for a majority
Party	Leader	Last election
ZANU–PF	Emmerson Mnangagwa	33
CCC	Disputed	27
- Maps
The election will be conducted using the constituencies laid out in the 2023 Delimitation Report

The 2030 Zimbabwean parliamentary election was originally scheduled to be held in 2028 in Zimbabwe as a general election to elect the president, members of the National Assembly and Senate, and local government officials. The elections were expected to be harmonised, with presidential, parliamentary and local polls occurring simultaneously in accordance with the Constitution of Zimbabwe.

On 7 July 2026, President Emmerson Mnangagwa assented to the Constitution of Zimbabwe Amendment (No. 3) Act, 2026 (No. 6 of 2026), which had passed through Parliament in June 2026. The Act extends the terms of the President, Parliament and local authorities from five to seven years (with transitional provisions applying to current incumbents), replaces direct popular election of the President with election by a joint sitting of Parliament, enlarges the Senate to 90 members (including ten presidential appointees chosen for professional skills), establishes a new Zimbabwe Electoral Delimitation Commission, transfers responsibility for the voters’ roll to the Registrar-General, and makes further changes to electoral institutions and other constitutional bodies. As a direct consequence, the harmonised general election originally due in 2028 has been postponed until 2030.

Incumbent President Emmerson Mnangagwa of the ruling Zimbabwe African National Union – Patriotic Front (ZANU–PF) was constitutionally barred from seeking a third term under the 2013 Constitution, having been elected in 2018 and re-elected in 2023. The Act's transitional provisions expressly permit him to remain in office until 2030. The amendments have generated significant controversy, with critics describing them as a "constitutional coup" that undermines democratic accountability and term limits, while supporters argue they provide necessary stability for national development under Vision 2030.

== Background ==
The previous general election was held on 23 August 2023, resulting in victory for ZANU–PF and President Mnangagwa, who secured 52.6% of the presidential vote against main opposition candidate Nelson Chamisa of the Citizens Coalition for Change (CCC), who received 44.0%. ZANU–PF also secured a majority in the National Assembly. The elections were criticised by international observers, including the Southern African Development Community (SADC), the Commonwealth and the European Union, for alleged irregularities, voter suppression and delays in urban areas.

Since 2023, Zimbabwe has continued to face serious economic difficulties, including high inflation, currency instability and efforts to phase out the US dollar by 2030. Internal divisions within ZANU–PF have deepened, particularly between factions aligned with Mnangagwa and those supporting Vice President Constantino Chiwenga. These tensions influenced internal debates over succession and term extensions.

== Electoral system ==
Prior to the 2026 amendments, Zimbabwe used a mixed-member proportional system for the National Assembly: 210 members elected by first-past-the-post in single-member constituencies, with 60 women's seats and 10 youth seats allocated by proportional representation from party lists. The Senate comprised 80 members (60 elected proportionally, 18 traditional chiefs and two representing persons with disabilities). The President was elected by direct popular vote requiring an absolute majority, with a runoff between the top two candidates if necessary.

The Constitution of Zimbabwe Amendment (No. 3) Act, 2026 fundamentally altered these arrangements:

- The President is now elected by members of Parliament sitting jointly. A candidate must obtain more than half of the valid votes cast; if no candidate achieves this, a runoff is held between the two leading candidates. The Zimbabwe Electoral Commission conducts the election in accordance with electoral law and parliamentary Standing Orders. A person elected President who was previously a Member of Parliament ceases to be an MP upon assuming office. Vacancies in the presidency are filled by a joint sitting within 30 days.
- Terms of office for the President, Parliament and local authorities are extended from five to seven years, with explicit transitional provisions applying the new term length to current office-holders.
- The Senate is increased from 80 to 90 members; the President may appoint ten additional senators “chosen for their professional skills and other competencies” after consultation with the National Assembly.
- A new Zimbabwe Electoral Delimitation Commission is established, appointed by the President and chaired by a Supreme Court judge or equivalent. Responsibility for voter registration and maintenance of the voters’ roll is transferred to the Registrar-General. Certain functions previously exercised by the Zimbabwe Electoral Commission have been removed or curtailed.
- Local government elections continue to use first-past-the-post for wards but now incorporate proportional representation quotas (minimum 30% women and 10% youth among ward-elected councillors).

These changes took effect upon presidential assent on 7 July 2026.

== Date ==
Under the original section 158 of the Constitution, general elections were required every five years, with the latest possible date for the 2028 poll being 3 September 2028 (before the expiry of the five-year parliamentary term on 4 September 2028).

The 2026 Act amended section 158 to require elections to be held thirty days before the expiry of the new seven-year parliamentary term. Combined with the transitional provisions in the amended sections 95 and 143 (which state that the seven-year term applies to the continuation in office of the current President, Senate and National Assembly notwithstanding section 328(7)), the current terms have been extended. The next harmonised general election is therefore due in 2030, the latest date being 5 August 2030.

The election originally scheduled for 2028 will not take place.

== Vision 2030 and political implications ==
Vision 2030 is Zimbabwe’s national development strategy aimed at achieving upper-middle-income status by 2030. The ruling party has linked political continuity to the successful implementation of Vision 2030, arguing that extended leadership provides the stability required for long-term policy execution. Critics maintain that the 2030 agenda has been invoked to justify constitutional changes that weaken term limits and democratic checks.

== Discussions on cancelling or postponing the elections ==
In 2025, proposals circulated within ZANU–PF-aligned circles to suspend or postpone the 2028 elections, with some figures, including Sengezo Tshabangu, advocating a suspension to prioritise economic recovery and Vision 2030. President Mnangagwa had previously stated that elections would proceed according to the constitutional timetable. Instead of outright cancellation, the government pursued constitutional amendment. The 2026 Act supplies the legal mechanism for extending the current term without formally cancelling the scheduled poll.

== Role of Sengezo Tshabangu ==
Sengezo Tshabangu has been a highly controversial figure since 2023, having initiated recalls of numerous CCC legislators that significantly reduced opposition representation in Parliament. In 2025 he publicly supported both the suspension of the 2028 elections and Mnangagwa’s term extension. Opposition and civil society critics have accused him of collaborating with ZANU–PF to weaken democratic institutions.

== See also ==
- 2023 Zimbabwean general election
- Politics of Zimbabwe
