= Zimbabwe Development Party =

Political party in Zimbabwe

- Founder: Kisnot Mukwazhi
- Founded: 4 February 2008
- Headquarters: Harare, Zimbabwe

The Zimbabwe Development Party is a minor Zimbabwean political party. It ran nine candidates in the Zimbabwean parliamentary election, 2008 but fared poorly, winning just 608 votes (0.03%).

The party was launched on 4 February 2008 in Harare by Kisnot Mukwazhi, a former ZANU-PF member. At the party's launch, attended by about fifty people, Mukwazhi praised ZANU-PF's policies and Robert Mugabe while castigating the MDC and Morgan Tsvangirai. The party's founders left the launch when grilled by journalists on the circumstances behind the party's sudden formation.

Mukwazhi stood as the party's presidential candidate for the Zimbabwean general election, 2013.
