= Mutasa North =

Parliamentary constituency in Zimbabwe

- Constituency for the National Assembly of Zimbabwe
- Province: Manicaland
- Region: Mutasa District

Current constituency
- Number of members: 1
- Party: ZANU–PF
- Member(s): Obey Bvute
- Created from: Mutasa

Mutasa North is a constituency represented in the National Assembly of the Parliament of Zimbabwe, located in Manicaland Province. Its current MP since the 2023 election is Obey Bvute of ZANU–PF.

== Profile ==
The constituency has 29,627 registered voters according to the 2008 ZEC Delimitation Report. Mutasa North is home to Honde Valley, Zindi, Hauna Business Centre and Green Valley. It is known for its rich soils and apple production. Majority of the residence find employment in the vast plantations. Mutasa North has a mixed and fair infrastructure development.

== History ==
In the 2005 general election the candidate of the ZANU–PF was declared the winner, with an overall majority. This was in contrast to the fact that the candidate of the Movement for Democratic Change polled an overall majority.

In 2008 David Anthony Chimhini of MDC-T won against Major General Michael Nyambuya.

In the 2018 election, Chido Madiwa of ZANU–PF was elected to represent the constituency.

== See also ==
- List of Zimbabwean parliamentary constituencies
