= President of the Senate of Zimbabwe =

(in other official languages)
Northern Ndebele	UMongameli wedale leSenethi
Shona	Mutungamiriri weSeneti
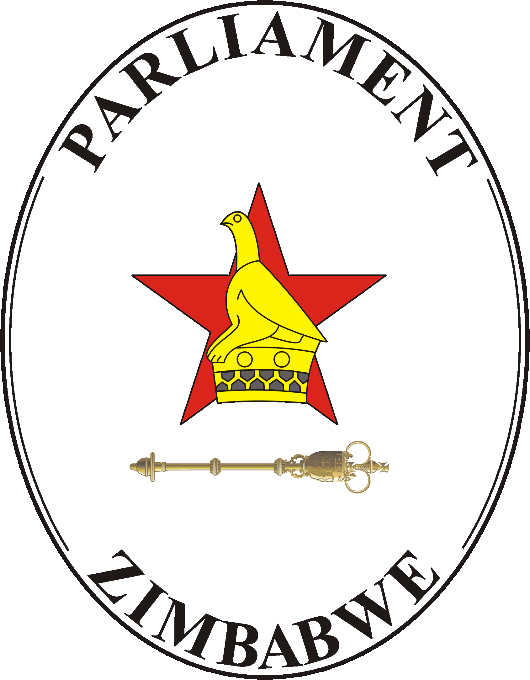
- Logo of the Parliament of Zimbabwe

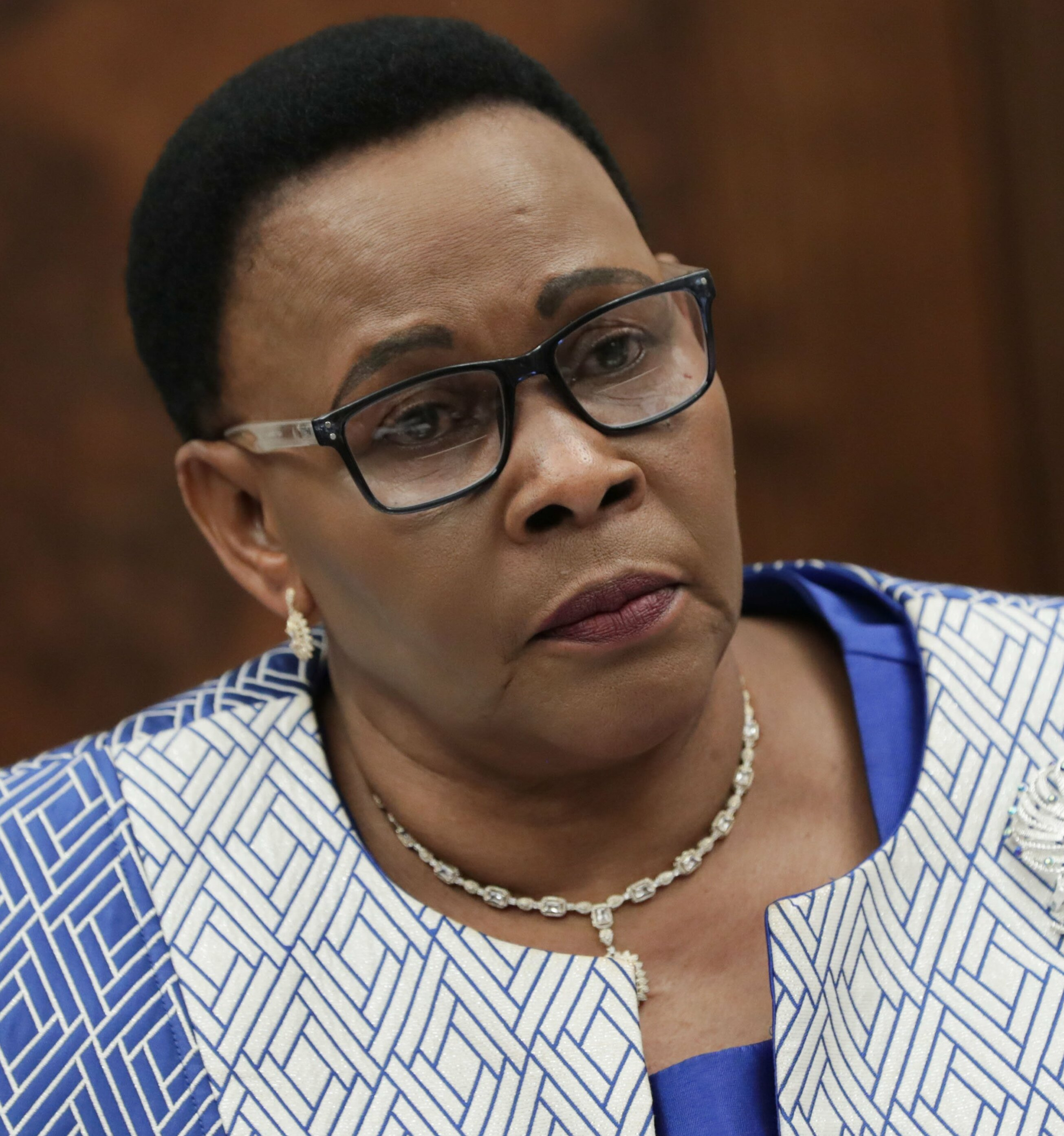
- Incumbent; Mabel Chinomona since 11 September 2018
- Senate of Zimbabwe
- Style: Madam President (informal and within the house); The Honourable (formal)
- Status: Presiding officer
- Member of: Senate
- Seat: New Parliament Building, Zimbabwe
- Appointer: Senate, approved and sworn in by the Chief Justice
- Term length: Seven years, elected by the Senate at the start of each parliament, and upon a vacancy
- Constituting instrument: Constitution of Zimbabwe
- Precursor: President of the Senate of Rhodesia
- Inaugural holder: Jack William Pithey (Rhodesia); Nolan Makombe (Zimbabwe)
- Formation: 1970
- Deputy: Deputy President of the Senate
- Website: Official website

The President of the Senate of Zimbabwe is the presiding officer of the Senate, the upper house of the Parliament of Zimbabwe. The President guides and regulates proceedings in the Senate, maintains order and decorum, rules on points of order and privilege, and represents the Senate in its relations with the Government, the National Assembly, and the public.

The office combines procedural authority with representative and ceremonial functions. Although the President is typically a member of the majority party, the role is exercised with impartiality in procedural matters. The current President is Mabel Chinomona, who has held the position since 11 September 2018.

== Role and functions ==
The President of the Senate presides over sittings of the Senate and is responsible for the orderly conduct of business in accordance with the Standing Orders of the Senate. Key functions include:

- Ruling on points of order, questions of privilege, and procedural matters;
- Maintaining order and decorum, with powers to name senators for disorderly conduct;
- Representing the Senate in official capacities, including communications with the President and the National Assembly;
- Presiding at joint sittings of Parliament when the Speaker is unavailable;
- Acting as deputy head of Parliament and presiding when the Speaker is unable to do so.

The President does not participate in debates or vote, except to exercise a casting vote in the event of a tie. The President also certifies certain procedural matters, such as affirmative votes on constitutional bills, and chairs or participates in the Committee on Standing Rules and Orders.

== History ==
The office of President of the Senate has its roots in the colonial and post-UDI periods. In Rhodesia, a bicameral Parliament was established in 1970, consisting of a House of Assembly and a Senate. The first President of the Senate was Jack William Pithey, who served from 1970 and also acted as President of Rhodesia in 1978–1979.

The role continued into the short-lived Zimbabwe-Rhodesia period (1979). Following independence in 1980, the office was retained in the new Parliament of Zimbabwe. Nolan Makombe was elected the first post-independence President of the Senate and served from 1980 to 1990. Under the Lancaster House Constitution he was the constitutional Deputy State President, until the constitution was amended following the Unity Accord of 1987.

The Senate was abolished between 1990 and 2005, during which time Parliament was unicameral. It was re-established under the 2005 constitutional amendments. Edna Madzongwe became the first female President of the Senate in 2005 and served until 2018.

The office was further strengthened under the 2013 Constitution, which provides a clear framework for election, tenure, removal, and functions while preserving the pre-independence tradition of an independent presiding officer.

== Election and tenure ==
The President of the Senate is elected by the Senate at its first sitting after a general election (and whenever a vacancy arises). The election is conducted by secret ballot under the supervision of the Zimbabwe Electoral Commission, in accordance with the Standing Orders.

A person is qualified for election if they are or have been a Senator or are qualified to be elected to the Senate. Before commencing duties, the President must take the oaths of loyalty and office before the Chief Justice or the next most senior available judge.

A Senator elected as President of the Senate ceases to be a Senator (the seat is filled in accordance with electoral law). The President may resign by announcing it in person to the Senate or by written notice to the Clerk of Parliament.

The President must vacate office:

- on the day the Senate first meets after a general election;
- upon accepting any other public office or employment;
- upon becoming a Member of Parliament or the Speaker;
- upon becoming a Vice-President, Minister or Deputy Minister;
- if circumstances arise that would oblige them to vacate their Senate seat; or
- if a resolution for removal is passed by at least two-thirds of the total membership of the Senate.

The term is therefore tied to the life of the Parliament: a maximum of five years, which was extended to seven years by the 2026 constitutional amendments.

== Deputy President of the Senate ==
The Senate elects a Deputy President of the Senate from among its members as soon as practicable after electing the President. The Deputy presides in the absence of the President and performs other duties as required. The Deputy vacates office upon ceasing to be a Senator, upon becoming the Speaker, upon becoming a Vice-President, Minister or Deputy Minister, or upon removal by a two-thirds resolution of the Senate.

The current Deputy President is Mike Nyambuya.

== Impartiality and conventions ==
Although the President of the Senate is usually a member of the ruling party (or supported by it), the office is expected to be exercised with impartiality in all procedural matters. Upon election, the President is required to resign any formal party positions and to act independently when presiding, ruling on points of order, and maintaining order.

This expectation of neutrality is rooted in the Westminster parliamentary model inherited from the colonial period in Southern Rhodesia, where Speakers and presiding officers of the Legislative Assembly and Senate were expected to maintain fairness and order regardless of their political background. The tradition continued through the Rhodesia and post-independence periods.

In practice, Presidents have generally been drawn from the majority party. However, once in the chair they are expected to apply the Standing Orders even-handedly and protect the rights of all senators. The President does not participate in debates and votes only in the event of a tie.

The 2013 Constitution reinforces independence by protecting the President from removal except by a resolution supported by at least two-thirds of the total membership of the Senate. This supermajority requirement safeguards the officeholder’s ability to act without fear of arbitrary partisan dismissal.

== See also ==
- List of presidents of the Senate of Zimbabwe
- Senate of Zimbabwe
- Parliament of Zimbabwe
- Speaker of the National Assembly of Zimbabwe
