= Edna Madzongwe =

Zimbabwean politician

The Rt. Hon. Edna Madzongwe
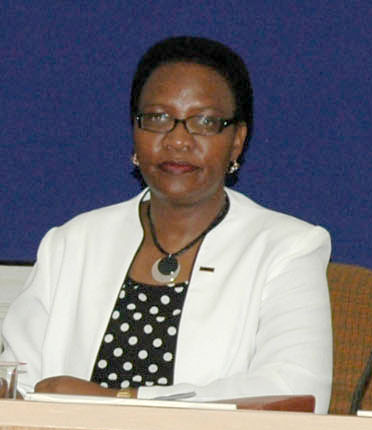

President of the Senate of Zimbabwe
- In office 30 November 2005 – 11 September 2018
- President: Robert Mugabe (before 2017) Emmerson Mnangagwa (after 2017)
- Preceded by: New position
- Succeeded by: Mabel Chinomona

Personal details
- Born: 11 July 1943 (age 83) Southern Rhodesia (now Zimbabwe)
- Party: ZANU-PF

Edna Madzongwe (born 11 July 1943) is a Zimbabwean politician who was the President of the Senate of the Republic of Zimbabwe from 2005 to 2018.

== Political career ==
She was elected as President of the Senate on 30 November 2005, the first female to hold this position. In the March 2008 parliamentary election, she was re-elected to the Senate from Chegutu constituency, receiving 23,032 votes against 14,275 for Violet Paneairi Mokoesti of the Movement for Democratic Change (MDC-Tsvangirai). Following this election, in which ZANU-PF won control of the Senate but not the House of Assembly, Madzongwe was re-elected as President of the Senate on 25 August 2008, receiving 58 votes. Gibson Sibanda, whose candidacy was supported by the two MDC factions (MDC-Tsvangirai and MDC-Mutambara), received 28 votes.

As of December 2008, she was embroiled in a dispute with an elderly white Zimbabwean farmer from Chegutu. Madzongwe has claimed the property as part of the government policy of redistributing land owned by white farmers, but the farmer has accused her of attempting to take his property by use of illegal means. The case has been referred to a tribunal of African judges established by the 15 nations of the Southern African Development Community regional trade bloc. However, the Tribunal has not been ratified and as such does not hold precedence over Zimbabwean law. This is the deadlock that the two parties were engaged in.

Following the July 2013 parliamentary election, in which ZANU-PF won a large majority, Madzongwe was re-elected as President of the Senate on 3 September 2013.

She was placed on the United States sanctions list in 2003.

Family

- Husband: Forbes Madzongwe (late)
- Children: Valentine, Farai and Tendai. Tsitsi (Step-daughter) and Martin (Step-son)
- Siblings: Eric Gwanzura (former Senator), Jane Gwanzura (late), Mike Gwanzura (late), Mabel Tawengwa née Gwanzura (wife to late George Tawengwa), Cleopus Gwanzura, Norma Gwanzura, Henry Gwanzura and Jacob Gwanzura (late).
- Parents: Enoch (Sireu) Gwanzura and Miriam (Mheria) Gwanzura née Gara.
