= Parliament House, Harare =

Government building in Zimbabwe

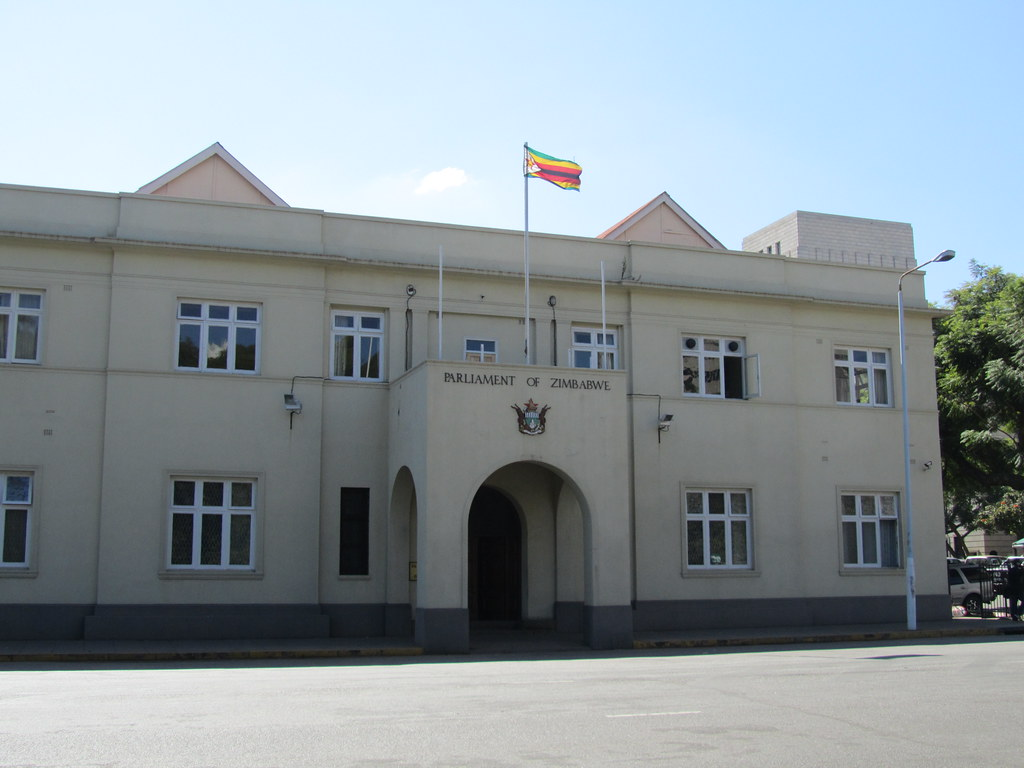
- Old Parliament House of Zimbabwe
- Interactive map of the Parliament House, Harare area

General information
- Location: Nelson Mandela Avenue (formerly Baker Avenue), Harare, Zimbabwe
- Coordinates: 17°49′41.4″S 31°03′08.0″E
- Year built: 1895-1898
- Inaugurated: 31 May 1899
- Closed: 7 November 2023
- Owner: Government of Zimbabwe

Website
- parlzim.gov.zw

Parliament House in Harare is a former legislative building which was active for 124 years, acting as the base of the Legislative Assembly of Rhodesia, the Parliament of Rhodesia and finally the Parliament of Zimbabwe. In November 2023, the Parliament of Zimbabwe relocated to the New Zimbabwe Parliament Building in Mount Hampden.

== History ==
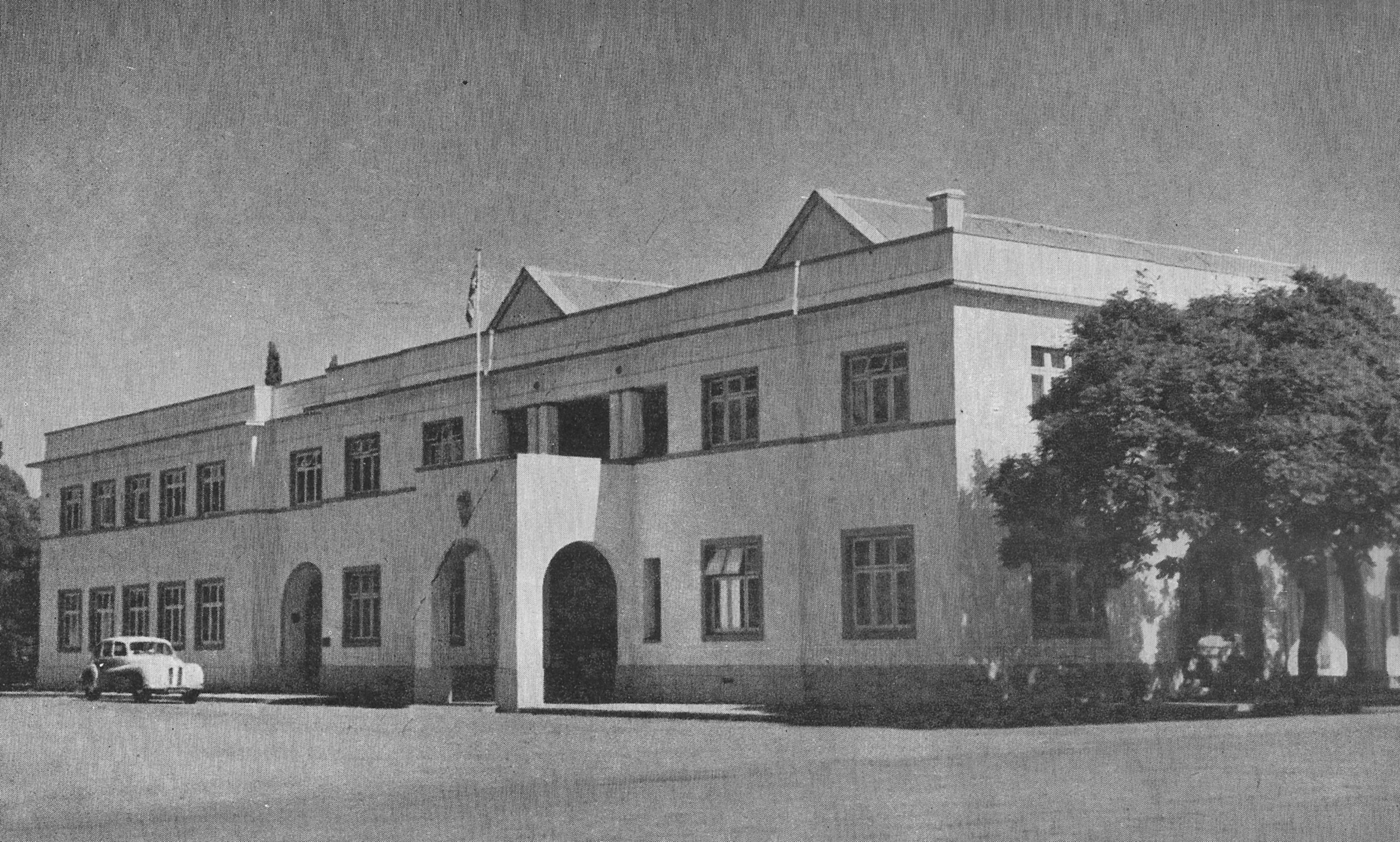
The Parliament building in 1954.

Construction of the building began in 1895 when Robert Snodgrass and David Mitchell, owners of the Hatfield Hotel on Pioneer Street, now Kaguvi Street, recognised the need for a hotel on the 'Causeway' side of Salisbury, where most of the civil servants lived.

Construction was interrupted by the Second Matabele War and the site was bought by the British South Africa Company in its unfinished state in 1898. The dining room of the hotel was converted into the chamber of the Legislative Assembly, which had its inaugural sitting on 31 May 1899, only eight days after the arrival of the first train into Salisbury.

In 1938, the balconies were enclosed, and the current facade was added in 1953 when the building was extended at the back to Union Avenue to house the Parliament of the newly-formed Federation of Rhodesia and Nyasaland. The Federal Parliament was opened on 3 February 1954, and was closed on 9 December 1963 when the Federation was dissolved. During this period, the Reading Room on the northern side of the building served as the Federal Chamber of Parliament.

In 1969, the extension at the back was heightened to six storeys to accommodate the newly-established Senate.

The first Parliament of Zimbabwe was opened on 14 May 1980 and consisted of 100 MPs and 30 senators. By the time of the 2023 election, the Constitution had altered the make-up of Parliament to accommodate 280 MPs and 80 senators. The National Assembly was only able to seat 100 MPs, and so a new parliament building was constructed in Mount Hampden. The final meeting of Parliament in the building was on 19 October 2023.
