= National Constitutional Assembly =

- Abbreviation: NCA
- Chairperson: Lovemore Madhuku
- Founded: 1997
- Ideology: Social democracy Pan-Africanism

The National Constitutional Assembly is a social-democratic and pan-Africanist political party. It was originally a non-governmental organisation formed in 1997 as a grouping of individual Zimbabwean citizens and civic organisations including, labour movements, student and youth groups, women groups, churches, business groups and human rights organisations, the founding Chairperson being Morgan Tsvangirayi who was then the Secretary General of the Zimbabwe Congress Of Trade Unions(ZCTU) It is currently led by chairperson Lovemore Madhuku. The organisation has historically been closely allied to the Movement for Democratic Change, but in 2013, became a political party of its own after rejecting the constitution written by the Government of National unity between MDC-T and ZANU - PF.

== History ==
The National Constitutional Assembly (NCA) was founded in 1997, and officially launched in 1998 at the University of Zimbabwe, by Zimbabwean individual citizens and civil society organisations, amongst which were trade unions, opposition parties, student groups, women's groups, representatives of the informal sector, and church groups. Notable founding members include Brian Kagoro, David Anthony Chimhini and Lovemore Madhuku.

The NCA was inspired by the popular uprising of the 1990s, and came to see the present constitution as an ideal umbrella cause in pursuing an array of political, social and economical causes. The constitution was seen by the NCA as particularly problematic in that it allowed too much power to be vested in the hands of the president, as well as it being a product of British colonial administration, where several clauses have expired because they were only meant to be utilized for a certain number of years.

== NCA as an organisation ==
The aims of the NCA are to help bring about the initiation of an inclusive and broad-based constitution-making process in Zimbabwe; to foster, protect and deepen a culture of human rights and respect for the rule of law in Zimbabwe and to implement, incorporate and protect human rights. NCA carries out grassroots campaigns, informing people about rights-related issues such as the need for an inclusive, broad-based constitution; facilitates debates; organises meetings, seminars and debate workshops; issues public statements; monitors legal, political and social developments in Zimbabwe; publishes reports on human-rights related topics such as the plight of women in Zimbabwe; and engages in local and international networking. NCA also organises demonstrations and civic education. The campaigns and other activities of the NCA have seemingly resulted in a more widespread awareness of constitutional issues among the Zimbabwean population.

The NCA has five branches: The Congress (legislative branch), the Annual Consultative Assembly (executive branch), the National Task Force, the Region, and the constituency. The Annual Consultative Assembly is the supreme governing organ of the NCA. The NCA changed its original structure in 2006, from having an Annual General Meeting (AGM) as its major decision-making entity, to having a Congress.

The congress meets every 5 years, and is made up of representatives from the various constituencies of the NCA, chairpersons, secretaries, youth representatives, women's representatives and committee members. The Task Force of the NCA is akin to an executive committee or board, and deals with the decision-making process in-between congresses, based on annual consultative assemblies. The institutional members of the NCA are composed of other organisations, such as political parties and woman's-, youth- and students’ organisations. NCA also has many individual members. Membership fees have recently been suggested as a source of income – one has generally been able to become a member by simply filling out a form. The organisation is believed to have a support base of up to 500.000 individuals, although this number includes MDC structures, as there is no national membership database.
