= Tsvangirai =

Tsvangirai is a Zimbabwean surname. Notable people with the surname include:

- Morgan Tsvangirai, Zimbabwean politician, Prime Minister of Zimbabwe
- Richard Tsvangirai, Zimbabwean politician
- Susan Tsvangirai, spouse of Morgan Tsvangirai
