= Mutoko District =

Coordinates: 17°10′S 32°30′E

Mutoko District is a district of Mashonaland East Province, Zimbabwe, in southern Africa. It is located in the eastern part of Zimbabwe, and covers 4,092.5 square kilometres (1,580 sq mi). In 2022, the district had a population of 161,091. At that time, nearly 50% of the population was under 19 years of age.

== Infrastructure ==
The settlement at Mutoko was designated as a "growth point" in the initial planning of the new Zimbabwe government in the early 1980s. It has electricity, a hospital, a post office, and banking facilities. In addition there is grain storage run by the Grain Marketing Board, and storage for cotton run by the Cotton Company of Zimbabwe.

There is a main road that runs northeast-southwest from Murehwa District with connections to Harare through the district to Mudzi District and thereafter to Mozambique.

There are no permanent streams in the district and most water is from boreholes. Some stream beds are dammed and catch seasonal run-off.

== Economy ==
The primary occupation is agriculture, with the majority being subsistence farmers. In 1998, about 12% of the land in the district was small commercial farms. The primary crop is maize, followed by ground nuts (peanuts), and table vegetables. Maize, ground nuts, sunflowers (for seed), sorghum, and millet are grown commercially.
