= 2013 Zimbabwean general election =

- 31 July 2013
- Presidential election
- Registered: 6,187,003 (Note: The last breakdown of registered voters was published on 9 July 2013, but this was not the one used during the elections. On 22 July the Registrar General announced in The Herald that the total had come to 6.4 million, without providing a breakdown.)
- Turnout: 56.25% (Note: Based on the last confirmed total of registered voters at 9 July 2013.)
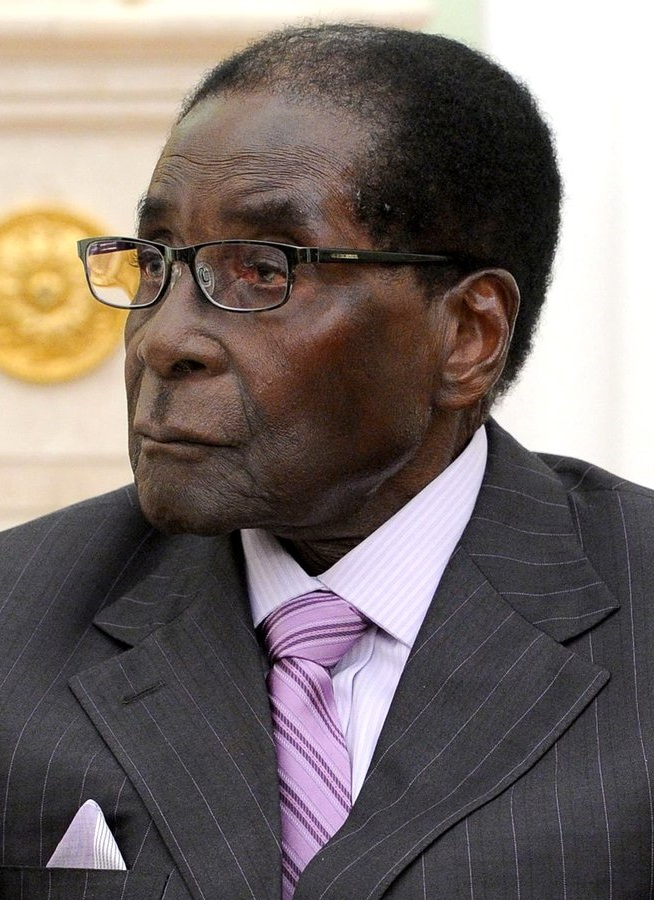

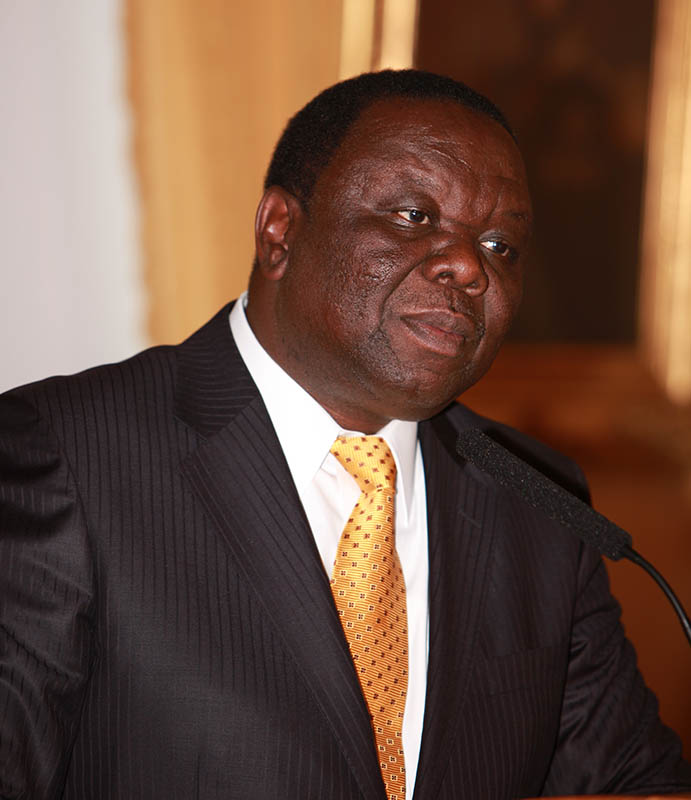
Candidate	Robert Mugabe	Morgan Tsvangirai
Party	ZANU–PF	MDC-T
Popular vote	2,110,434	1,172,349
Percentage	61.88%	34.37%
President before election
Robert Mugabe
ZANU–PF
Elected President
Robert Mugabe
ZANU–PF
- National Assembly
- All 270 seats in the National Assembly; 136 seats needed for a majority
Party	Leader	Vote %	Seats	+/–
ZANU–PF	Robert Mugabe	62.93	197	+98
MDC-T	Morgan Tsvangirai	30.24	70	−30
MDC	Welshman Ncube	4.70	2	−8
Independent	Jonathan Tawonana Samukange	1.34	1	0
This lists parties that won seats. See the complete results below.
- Senate
- 60 of the 80 seats in the Senate; 41 seats needed for a majority
Party	Leader	Seats	+/–
ZANU–PF	Robert Mugabe	37	+7
MDC-T	Morgan Tsvangirai	21	−3
MDC	Welshman Ncube	2	−4
This lists parties that won seats. See the complete results below.
- Maps

General elections were held in Zimbabwe on 31 July 2013. Incumbent President Robert Mugabe was re-elected, whilst his ZANU–PF party won a two-thirds majority in the National Assembly.

The elections were not free and fair, as the ruling ZANU–PF party used the state to intimidate the opposition.

== Background ==
This was the first election held under the new constitution approved in a referendum in March 2013 and signed into law by President Robert Mugabe on 22 May. The Supreme Court ruled on 31 May that President Mugabe should set a date as soon as possible, and that presidential and parliamentary elections must be held by 31 July. The ruling followed an application to the court by a Zimbabwean citizen, Jealousy Mawarire, demanding that the country's president set the date for elections before the expiry of the tenure of the seventh parliament, on 29 June 2013. Under the new constitution the winner of the presidential election would serve a five-year term.

== Candidates ==
=== Presidential candidates ===
- Robert Mugabe, ZANU–PF
- Welshman Ncube, MDC-N
- Morgan Tsvangirai, MDC-T
- Dumiso Dabengwa, ZAPU
- Kisinoti Mukwazhe (also spelt Kisnot Mukwazhi), ZDP. Candidacy later withdrawn.

=== Parliamentary candidates ===
Most of Zimbabwe's 2010 districts had candidates from all of the three major parties: ZANU–PF, one of the two formulations of the MDC, and ZAPU. Minor party candidates and independents rounded out the field in some districts.

== Campaign ==
In accepting the election date, Tsvangirai said that reforms should have preceded the election, as he began his election campaign. He also claimed that the country wanted to vote Mugabe out. Launching his election campaign, Mugabe called it "a do or die struggle" while making a strong appeal for a peaceful campaign. In the same speech, he warned that he could take Zimbabwe out of SADC "if SADC decides to do stupid things". Although there were initial discussions about forming a grand coalition between the two MDC parties and other opposition parties, by 9 July two separate coalitions had been formed, one comprising MDC-T, Mavambo/Kusile/Dawn and ZANU-Ndonga, and the other coalition comprising MDC and ZAPU.

=== Regalia ===
During the campaign, party regalia was supplied by the two main political parties in huge quantities. MDC-T supporters wore red apparel, whilst ZANU–PF supporters wore a variety of colours borrowed from the national flag.

=== Accusations of unfairness ===
Allegations were made in 2011, that a third of registered voters were dead or aged 120 (in a country with a life expectancy of 44). These accusations were repeated in 2013, with the additional claim that a considerable number of young voters had not been registered. The Zimbabwe Election Support Network (ZESN), a local observer group with 7,000 monitors, listed a litany of offences, including state media bias, a campaign of intimidation in rural areas, and the rushed electoral process before key reforms to the security services were in place. But the most effective measure was tampering with the electoral rolls. Held back until the day before the election – thus avoiding proper scrutiny – the roll revealed an estimated one million invalid names, including many deceased voters. It excluded up to one million real ones, mostly in urban areas where MDC support is strongest.

On the day of the elections, one of Zimbabwe's electoral commissioners resigned. In his resignation letter, Mkhululi Nyathi of the Zimbabwe Electoral Commission wrote, "I do not wish to enumerate the many reasons of my resignation, but they all have to do with the manner the Zimbabwe 2013 harmonised elections were proclaimed and conducted."

The Electoral Commission later reported that approximately 305,000 voters were turned away from polls, with an additional 207,000 voters being "assisted" in casting their ballots. There were also more than 100,000 centenarian ghost voters on the electoral roll.

On 9 August 2013, the Movement for Democratic Change sought to have the results declared null and void. A week later they withdrew their petition. Despite their withdrawal the Supreme Court of Zimbabwe ruled that the election was "free, fair and credible".

== Results ==
Robert Mugabe won 62% of the vote to claim a sixth term as president, and was sworn in on Thursday 22 August. Morgan Tsvangirai finished second with 34% of the vote. Mugabe's ZANU–PF party also dominated the parliamentary election winning 196 seats. Tsvangirai's Movement for Democratic Change party won 70 seats.

Reports by the Zimbabwe Election Support Network monitoring group said as many as one million people, mostly in urban areas (which tend to favour the MDC), were unable to cast votes. Other reports suggested that people had been forced to vote for Mugabe. The African Union also had monitors in place and said the election could have been handled better, but that initial reports indicated a fair election had occurred. Western groups were not allowed to send monitors.

=== President ===
Candidate	Party	Votes	%
Robert Mugabe	ZANU–PF	2,110,434	61.88
Morgan Tsvangirai	MDC–Tsvangirai	1,172,349	34.37
Welshman Ncube	MDC–Ncube	92,637	2.72
Dumiso Dabengwa	Zimbabwe African People's Union	25,416	0.75
Kisinoti Mukwazhe	Zimbabwe Development Party	9,931	0.29
Total		3,410,767	100.00
Valid votes		3,410,767	98.01
Invalid/blank votes		69,280	1.99
Total votes		3,480,047	100.00
Registered voters/turnout		6,187,003	56.25
Source: NORDEM ZEC

=== National Assembly ===
The independent candidate Jonathan Tawonana Samukange had failed to win the ZANU-PF nomination for Mudzi South but won the seat. In February 2015 he was readmitted to ZANU-PF.

Party	Votes	%	Seats		
Party	Votes	%	Common	Women	Total
ZANU–PF	2,145,257	62.93	160	37	197
MDC–Tsvangirai	1,031,048	30.24	49	21	70
MDC–Ncube	160,232	4.70	0	2	2
Zimbabwe African People's Union	14,309	0.42	0	0	0
Mavambo/Kusile/Dawn	6,709	0.20	0	0	0
United Movement for Democracy	1,563	0.05	0	0	0
FreeZim Congress	1,405	0.04	0	0	0
ZANU–Ndonga	1,250	0.04	0	0	0
Alliance Khumbula Ekhaya	380	0.01	0	0	0
Progressive and Innovative Movement of Zimbabwe	350	0.01	0	0	0
Freedom Front	200	0.01	0	0	0
Congress for True Democracy	147	0.00	0	0	0
Zimbabwe Development Party	145	0.00	0	0	0
Multi-Racial Christian Democrats	83	0.00	0	0	0
People's Democratic Union	76	0.00	0	0	0
Zimbabwe People's Movement	70	0.00	0	0	0
Voice of the People	38	0.00	0	0	0
Independents	45,745	1.34	1	0	1
Total	3,409,007	100.00	210	60	270
Valid votes	3,409,007	97.99			
Invalid/blank votes	70,022	2.01			
Total votes	3,479,029	100.00			
Source: Zimbabwe Electoral Commission

=== Senate ===
Party	Seats	+/–
ZANU–PF	37	–2
MDC–Tsvangirai	21	New
MDC	2	–20
Chiefs	18	0
Persons with disabilities	2	0
Total	80	0
Source: Zimbabwe Electoral Commission

== Reactions ==
=== Domestic ===
The elections were called a "huge farce" by Tsvangirai who said the country was "in mourning" about the results. He claimed over a million voters were turned away from the polling stations, and said the Movement for Democratic Change would no longer work with Mugabe nor participate in government institutions. He promised to fight the results in court and diplomatically.

=== International ===
- African Union – The African Union declared that the elections were "free, honest and credible."
- Botswana – The government of President Ian Khama has called for an audit of the election results and the Foreign Minister, Phandu Skelemani, has stated that "various incidents and circumstances were revealed that call into question whether the entire electoral process, and thus its final result, can be recognised as having been fair, transparent and credible."
- Mozambique – President Armando Guebuza demanded that the elections be a topic of the 2013 SADC Summit in Lilongwe, Malawi.
- Mauritius – The Prime Minister, Navin Ramgoolam, congratulated President Mugabe and expressed his view that ZANU–PF's victory will usher in a new era of prosperity and peace for Zimbabweans.
- Namibia – President Hifikepunye Pohamba congratulated Mugabe and Zimbabwe for holding free and peaceful elections and stated to Mugabe: "The people of Zimbabwe have once again demonstrated their trust and confidence in the Zanu PF and your personal leadership."
- South Africa – President Jacob Zuma congratulated Mugabe for securing a seventh term in office. A statement was issued by the South African Foreign Ministry saying: "President Zuma urges all political parties in Zimbabwe to accept the outcome of the elections as election observers reported it to be an expression of the will of the people."
- SADC – The Southern African Development Community called the election "free and peaceful" but reserved judgement on its fairness. On 15 August, it apologised for calling the elections credible in spite of evidence that there were many irregularities.
- Australia – The Foreign Minister, Bob Carr, was critical of the election stating: "These appear to have disenfranchised large numbers of voters and raised doubts about the credibility of the election results. Given our doubts about the results, Australia calls for a re-run of the elections based on a verified and agreed voters roll."
- European Union – The High Representative of the Union for Foreign Affairs and Security Policy, Baroness Ashton, said "the EU is concerned about alleged irregularities and reports of incomplete participation, as well as the identified weaknesses in the electoral process and a lack of transparency."
- Russia – President Vladimir Putin congratulated Mugabe on his victory and congratulated Zimbabwe for holding "peaceful and credible elections."
- United Kingdom – The Foreign Secretary, William Hague, voiced "grave concerns" about the conduct of the election. Hague said there were "serious" questions about the credibility of the election, because of irregularities both in the run-up to the ballot and on polling day.
- United States – The United States said the results were not a "credible expression of the will of the Zimbabwean people".

== Aftermath ==
Mugabe was sworn in for his new term as president on 22 August 2013 at a ceremony in Harare. Speaking at the ceremony, he promised economic growth, focusing on mining: "The mining sector will be the centrepiece of our economic recovery and growth. It should generate growth spurts across the sector, reignite that economic miracle which must now happen."

The members of the National Assembly and the Senate were sworn in for the new parliamentary term on 3 September 2013. Given ZANU–PF's large majority of seats, its candidates for the posts of Speaker of the National Assembly and President of the Senate were assured of election, and the MDC-T did not present candidates for the posts. ZANU–PF's candidates were elected without opposition on the same day: in the National Assembly, Jacob Mudenda as Speaker and Mabel Chinomona as Deputy Speaker, and in the Senate, Edna Madzongwe as president and Chenhamo Chimutengwende as vice-president. MDC-T MPs boycotted the vote that elected Mudenda as Speaker.

On 10 September 2013, Mugabe appointed his new cabinet. The cabinet line-up was generally characterised as rewarding veteran ZANU–PF hardliners, who were appointed to most of the key posts: Patrick Chinamasa as Minister of Finance, Emmerson Mnangagwa as Minister of Justice, Sydney Sekeramayi as Minister of Defense, and Jonathan Moyo as Minister of Information. However, some posts went to ZANU–PF moderates and younger politicians.

President Mugabe opened Parliament on 17 September 2013. On that occasion he vowed that "the indigenisation programme is to be pursued with renewed vigour".
