= Traditional leaders in Zimbabwe =

Zimbabwean traditional leaders: roles, regulations, and lineage

Chiefs and traditional leaders in Zimbabwe are unelected, hereditary figures who serve as the primary local governance structure in rural areas, acting as custodians of cultural values, customs, and communal land while also performing administrative and judicial functions within their communities.

== Roles ==
Traditional leaders play many roles in Zimbabwean communities, culture and families. They help to promote and uphold cultural values, facilitate development and resolving of disputes in their communities.

== Legal and Constitutional Framework ==
The institution of traditional leadership is regulated and monitored within the parameters of the Constitution of Zimbabwe. These leaders are put in position by the government of Zimbabwe to work with the people.

== Leadership and Lineage ==
A chief is not elected into office by popular vote, but through lineage, and is thus in office for life.

== Land Custodianship ==
Chiefs and traditional leaders are custodians, not owners, of land, holding it in trust for the community. Their role is to safeguard land and community values for past, present, and future generations, managing it ethically and fairly according to shared norms.

The community owns the land, while chiefs manage it. Documenting customary practices through collective agreement helps ensure tradition remains accountable. A key distinction is made between sovereignty (owning territory) and stewardship (managing resources for others), positioning traditional leadership as a service rooted in trust, consensus, and accountability

== Communal Land Governance and Public Awareness ==
In terms of the Communal Land Act, communal land is vested in the State and is not subject to sale. Rights of occupation and use may be granted in accordance with the Act and related legislation. Government responses to illegal land allocations have included public awareness initiatives and measures to clarify the lawful roles of traditional leaders and to prevent unauthorised land transactions.

== See also ==
- Zimbabwe Council of Chiefs
