= Senate of Zimbabwe =

Upper house of the Parliament of Zimbabwe

15 other official names
- - Shona: Seneti
  - Ndebele: Idale Lesenethi
  - Chewa: Nyumba Ya Seneti
  - Chibarwe: Seneti
  - Kalanga: Senethi
  - Koisan: Dale Senethi M Di
  - Nambya: ISeneti
  - Ndau: Bandhla Reseneti
  - Shangani: Seneti
  - Sesotho: Seneta
  - Tonga: Ng’anda Yaajulu Yamilawu
  - Tswana: Senethe
  - Venda: Vhutendelwamilayo
  - Xhosa: Isenethi
- 10th Parliament of Zimbabwe
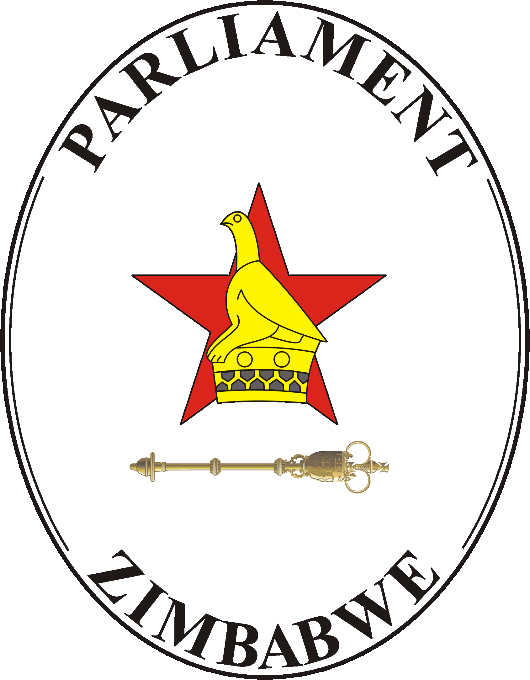

Type
- Type: Upper house of the Parliament of Zimbabwe
- Term limits: None

History
- Founded: 18 April 1980
- Preceded by: Parliament of Rhodesia
- New session started: 4 September 2023 (Note: Under the Constitution of Zimbabwe, a new term of Parliament begins on the day that the President-Elect is sworn in following a general election. Members themselves were sworn in on 7 September 2023 and the first session was opened on 3 October 2023.)

Leadership
- President: Mabel Chinomona, ZANU-PF since 11 September 2018
- Deputy President: Michael Reuben Nyambuya since 11 September 2018
- Clerk: Kennedy Mugove Chokuda

Structure
- Seats: 90
- Political groups: Provincial Senators (60) ZANU–PF (33) CCC (27) Chiefs (18) Chiefs (18) Persons with disabilities (2) Persons with disabilities (2) Presidential appointees (10) Presidential appointees (10) Vacant (0) Vacant (0) Presiding officer (1) President (1)
- Length of term: Seven years

Elections
- Voting system: Parallel voting
- First election: 26 November 2005
- Last election: 23 August 2023
- Next election: No later than 5 August 2028
- Redistricting: Every ten years by the Zimbabwe Electoral Commission, in consultation with the President and Parliament

Meeting place
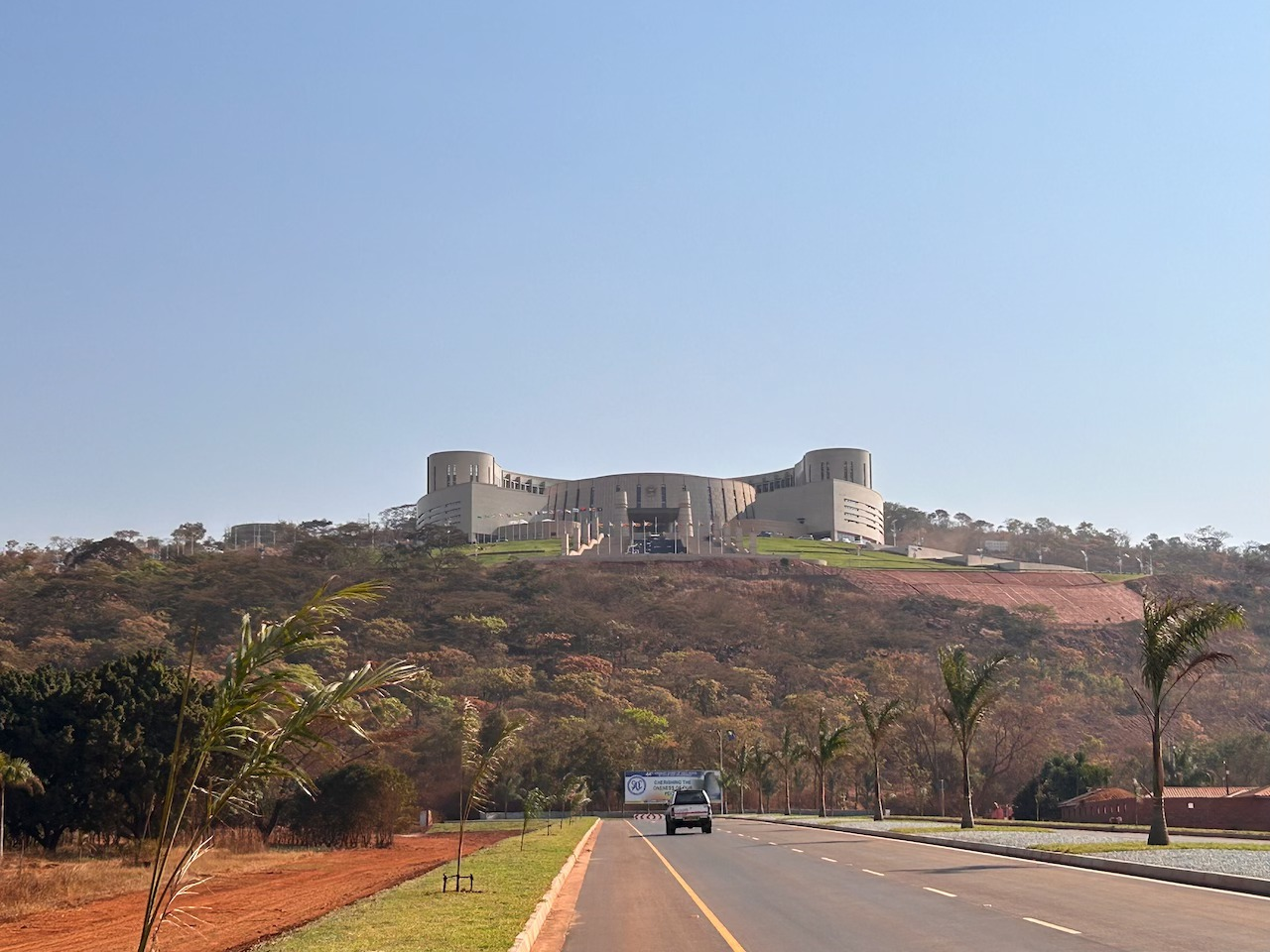
- Senate Chamber; New Zimbabwe Parliament Building; Mount Hampden; Zimbabwe
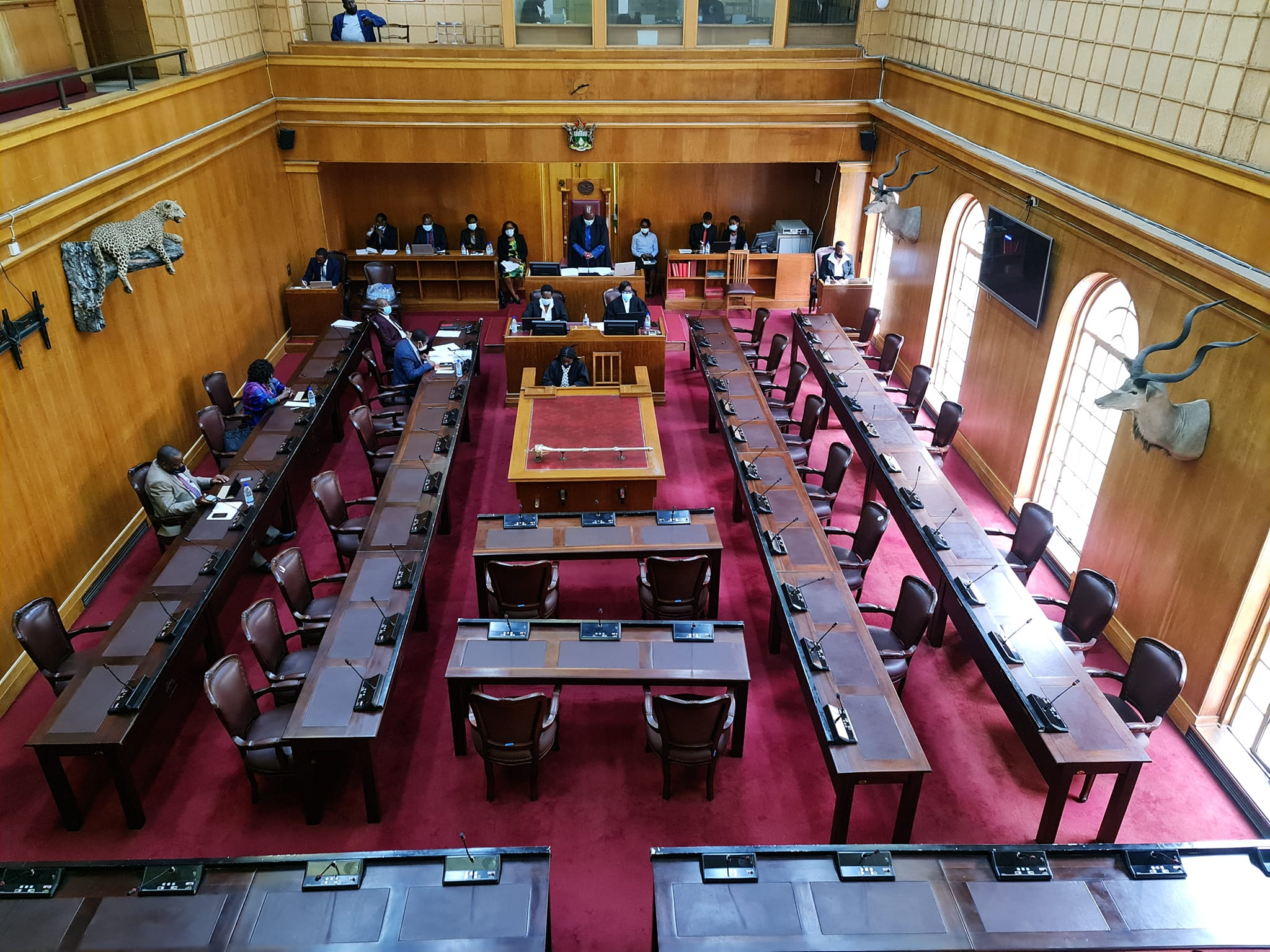
- Before 2023: Senate Chamber; Parliament House; Harare; Zimbabwe

Website
- parlzim.gov.zw

The Senate of Zimbabwe is the upper of the two chambers in Zimbabwe's Parliament. It existed from independence in 1980 until 1989, and was re-introduced in November 2005. The other chamber of Parliament is the National Assembly.

In its current form, the Senate has 90 members. Of these, 60 members are elected from 10 six-member constituencies (based on the provinces) by proportional representation using party lists; the lists must have a woman at the top and alternate between men and women. The other 30 seats include two reserved for people with disabilities and 18 for traditional chiefs, while 10 are appointed directly by the President

== History before abolition ==
The original Senate consisted of 40 members. 24 members were elected by the House of Assembly (the directly elected lower chamber), of whom 14 were elected by an electoral college of members from the common roll, while 10 were elected by an electoral college of members from the white roll. 10 were to be chosen by the Council of Chiefs, 5 each from Mashonaland and Matabeleland. The remaining 6 were appointed by the President, acting on the advice of the Prime Minister. Under the Lancaster House Agreement, 20% of seats in both chambers were reserved for whites, until 1987. It was abolished in 1989 with Constitution of Zimbabwe Amendment No. 31, with membership of the House of Assembly being expanded to include those nominated by the President.

== History after reestablishment ==
The re-established Senate, formed following the elections held on 26 November 2005, had a total of 66 members. 50 members (5 from each province) were directly elected in single-member constituencies using the First-past-the-post system. The President appointed 6 additional members and the remaining 10 seats were held by traditional chiefs who were chosen in separate elections. Twenty-one women (20 elected and 1 appointed) occupy seats in the Senate.

The Constitution of Zimbabwe Amendment No 18 of 2007 provided for the expansion of the Senate to 93 seats: six Senators from each province directly elected by voters registered in the 60 Senate constituencies; the 10 Provincial Governors appointed by the President; the president and deputy president of Council of Chiefs; 16 chiefs, being two chiefs from each province other than metropolitan provinces, and five Senators appointed by the President.

The current Senate resulted from the 2013 constitution. The current Senate consists of 80 members, of whom 60 are elected for seven-year terms in 6-member constituencies representing one of the 10 provinces, elected based on the votes in the lower house election, using party-list proportional representation, distributed using the Hare quota. Additionally the Senate consists of 2 seats for each non-metropolitan provinces of Zimbabwe elected by each provincial assembly of chiefs using SNTV, 1 seat each for the president and deputy president of the National Council of Chiefs and 1 male and 1 female seat for people with disabilities elected on separate ballots using FPTP by an electoral college designated by the National Disability Board.

== See also ==
- History of Zimbabwe
- House of Assembly of Zimbabwe
- Legislative branch
- List of national legislatures
- List of presidents of the Senate of Zimbabwe
- List of Zimbabwean parliamentary constituencies
