= Lovemore Madhuku =

Zimbabwean politician

- Born: 20 July 1966 (age 60); Chipinge, Rhodesia (now Zimbabwe)
- Education: University of Zimbabwe (LLB, 1990); University of Cambridge (PhD, 1999)
- Occupation: law professor
- Employer: University of Zimbabwe
- Organization: National Constitutional Assembly
- Known for: democracy activism

Lovemore Madhuku is a Zimbabwean politician and democracy activist who is best known for being one of the founding members of the National Constituent Assembly ((NCA)), a pro-democracy group. An active civil society worker, Madhuku served as NCA's President from 2001 to 2011. During his tenure as the President, he aimed at bringing forth a new autonomous constitution in Zimbabwe that would get rid of the one-party rule of Robert Mugabe, President of Zimbabwe since 1987.

The highlight of his career came when the NCA defeated a constitution introduced by Mugabe in the national referendum in 2000. Ever since Madhuku has been trying to bring to an end the autocratic rule and establish a democratic constitution in Zimbabwe. He has been appointed as a full-time professor at the University of Zimbabwe since 2011. Madhuku penned the famous textbook, 'An Introduction to Zimbabwean Law' which gives an insight into Zimbabwean legal system.

== Background and academic career ==
Madhuku was born on 20 July 1966 in Chipinge, Zimbabwe. He attended the University of Zimbabwe (UZ), receiving a Bachelor of Law degree in 1990. He then travelled to the UK to study at the University of Cambridge, receiving a Master of Law in 1994 and a doctorate in 1999. In 2010, he published a book titled An Introduction to Zimbabwean Law. He was made a full professor at UZ in 2011.

== Activism ==
Madhuku is a founding member of the National Constitutional Assembly (NCA), a pro-democracy group allied with the Movement for Democratic Change led by Morgan Tsvangirai. The group opposes the one-party rule of President Robert Mugabe and seeks to establish a democratic constitution. Madhuku served as its vice president from 1997 to 2001 and its president from 2001 to 2011. In 2000, he helped to defeat a constitution introduced by Mugabe in a national referendum. Mugabe described Madhuku's activities as "opportunism", stating: "There are some fraudulent human rights campaigners like Lovemore Madhuku and his NCA who, when broke, intentionally provoke the police in order to get arrested and raise money from the donors. As such, they easily attract the attention international media line CNN, BBC over nothing. That's the Madhuku survival strategy for you".

In November 2001, Madhuku was detained without charge for leading a demonstration after soldiers allegedly strangled a student and threw him from a train. According to journalist Geoffrey Nyarota, Madhuku was also subject to a smear campaign by state-owned media. Madhuku has stated that his country home was burned down and his house in Harare badly damaged by attacks. In February 2004, he was arrested during a protest, beaten, and left for dead outside Harare. On recovering, he stated, "We will not be deterred by the beatings and the cruelty of this regime. They can only stop us by killing us." In October of the same year, Mugabe's government introduced a bill into parliament seeking to ban nongovernmental organizations, including the NCA. In November 2006, he was charged with organizing an illegal protest, but a magistrate later dismissed the charges. Police assaulted him again in March 2007, breaking his arm and leaving him with cuts to the head and body.

He was summoned to court again in 2011 for his leadership of 2004 protests, drawing international criticism.

Madhuku was re-elected as the NCA's chair in 2006 under controversial circumstances, as he had amended its constitution to extend his term of office. According to Radio Netherlands, Madhuku was particularly criticized for serving several terms after having himself criticized Mugabe for serving more than two terms in office. He completed his final term as the group's chair in 2011.

Madhuku was awarded the 2004 Civil Courage Prize by the US-based Train Foundation, sharing it with Iranian activist Emadeddin Baghi. He was unable to attend the ceremony due to the proposing banning of the NCA, and sending Nyarota to accept it on his behalf. together with Godfrey Nyamukuwa
