= National Council of Chiefs (Zimbabwe) =

Assembly of traditional leaders in Zimbabwe

(in other official languages)
Northern Ndebele	IKhansili yelizwe
Shona	Dare reMadzishe reNyika

Statutory body overview
- Formed: 1980 (formal establishment post-independence); Pre-colonial origins in Shona and Ndebele chieftainship systems
- Jurisdiction: Zimbabwe
- Status: Active
- Statutory body executives: Chief Lucas Mtshane Khumalo, President; Chief Fortune Charumbira, Deputy President
- Key document: Constitution of Zimbabwe; Traditional Leaders Act (Chapter 29:17)

The National Council of Chiefs is a statutory body that represents traditional leaders (chiefs) throughout Zimbabwe. It serves as the national voice of chieftainship, advising on matters of customary law, culture, and rural governance while participating in national institutions such as the Senate.

The Council operates under Chapter 15 of the Constitution of Zimbabwe (2013), which recognises the institution, status, and role of traditional leaders. Traditional leaders are responsible for performing cultural, customary, and traditional functions within their communities, including the promotion of cultural values, resolution of disputes, and allocation of communal land (subject to national law). The Council itself was constituted by an Act of Parliament to coordinate and represent all chiefs nationally.

== History ==
=== Pre-colonial and colonial origins ===
Chieftainship in what is now Zimbabwe has deep pre-colonial roots in both Shona and Ndebele societies. Chiefs exercised authority over land, dispute resolution, and spiritual matters under customary law. Colonial rule from the late 19th century significantly altered this system. Under the British South Africa Company and later the colonial government, chiefs were co-opted into a system of indirect rule. They were often stripped of significant powers, placed under the control of Native Commissioners, and used to collect taxes and enforce colonial policies. Resistance by some chiefs led to their deposition or marginalisation.

=== Role during the Rhodesia and UDI period ===
During the Rhodesia era, particularly after the Unilateral Declaration of Independence in 1965, the Ian Smith regime sought to gain the support of and granted additional powers to certain chiefs in an effort to legitimise its authority and counter African nationalist movements. Legislation such as the African Law and Tribal Courts Act (1969) expanded the judicial role of chiefs in rural areas by granting them limited criminal jurisdiction. Many chiefs were appointed to the Senate or other advisory bodies, and the regime portrayed them as representatives of “traditional” African opinion in support of continued white minority rule. However, this relationship was contested; some chiefs supported the liberation movements (ZANU and ZAPU), while others faced coercion or removal for opposing the government. The period saw increased politicisation of chieftainship, with the state using patronage to secure loyalty.

=== Post-independence developments ===
After independence in 1980, the ZANU-PF government initially viewed traditional leaders with suspicion, associating them with colonial collaboration. The Senate included a limited number of chiefs selected by the Council of Chiefs, but their influence was curtailed. The Senate was abolished in 1990, although later restored in 2005. During the 1990s and especially the 2000s fast-track land reform programme, many chiefs aligned more closely with the ruling party and received land allocations and other benefits while mobilising rural support. This period saw growing criticism of the politicisation of traditional leaders.

The 2013 Constitution marked a significant elevation in the formal status of traditional leaders and the National Council of Chiefs, integrating them more explicitly into the governance framework while prohibiting them from engaging in partisan politics.

== Legal and constitutional framework ==
Chapter 15 of the 2013 Constitution (sections 280–283) provides the primary legal recognition of traditional leaders. It affirms that the institution, status, and role of traditional leaders under customary law are recognised. Traditional leaders must:

- Promote and uphold the cultural values of their communities;
- Treat all persons within their areas equally and fairly;
- Not engage in partisan politics;
- Not abuse their powers; and
- Perform functions assigned by the Constitution or an Act of Parliament.

The Traditional Leaders Act (Chapter 29:17) and related legislation govern the appointment, removal, and conduct of chiefs, headmen, and village heads according to customary law, with oversight by the Ministry responsible for local government. The National Council of Chiefs is established by an Act of Parliament to represent all chiefs and advise on matters affecting traditional leadership.

== Functions and powers ==
Traditional leaders, coordinated nationally by the Council, perform a range of roles including:

- Promotion of cultural and traditional values;
- Resolution of disputes in accordance with customary law (subject to constitutional rights);
- Allocation and administration of communal land (in consultation with relevant authorities);
- Environmental protection and sustainable resource management within their areas;
- Mobilisation of communities for development projects; and
- Representation of community interests to government.

The Council itself facilitates coordination among chiefs, organises training, and provides a collective voice on national policy issues affecting rural and traditional communities.

== Participation in the Senate ==
The National Council of Chiefs has long been linked to the upper house of Parliament. Under the 1980 Lancaster House Constitution, the Council was responsible for selecting a number of chiefs to sit in the Senate. Following the restoration of the Senate in 2005 and the adoption of the 2013 Constitution, this role was formalised and expanded.

Under the current framework (section 120 of the 2013 Constitution), the Senate includes:

- 16 chiefs (two elected by each provincial assembly of chiefs from the eight non-metropolitan provinces); and
- The President and Deputy President of the National Council of Chiefs, who serve ex officio.

This gives traditional leaders a guaranteed minimum of 18 seats in the 80-member Senate. Chiefs elected to the Senate also serve on their respective provincial councils, linking traditional leadership with the devolved governance structures established under Chapter 14 of the Constitution.

== Devolution and local governance ==
Chapter 14 of the 2013 Constitution provides for devolution of governmental powers and functions to provincial and local levels. Traditional leaders are integrated into this framework. Chiefs (and other traditional leaders) are represented on provincial councils and play roles in local planning, development, and service delivery in rural areas. This represents a formal recognition of their governance role alongside elected structures.

However, implementation of devolution has been uneven, and tensions sometimes arise between traditional leaders and elected local government officials over authority, particularly regarding land and resource allocation. The Council of Chiefs has advocated for greater recognition and resources for traditional institutions within the devolved system.

== Leadership ==
The National Council of Chiefs is led by a President and Deputy President, elected by the chiefs. As of 2023, Chief Lucas Mtshane Khumalo of Matabeleland North Province serves as President, with Chief Fortune Charumbira as Deputy President. Both hold ex officio seats in the Senate for the duration of their terms.

== See also ==
- Traditional leaders in Zimbabwe
- Senate of Zimbabwe
- National House of Traditional Leaders of South Africa
- Council of Traditional Leaders of Namibia
- Ntlo ya Dikgosi of Botswana
- Senate of Lesotho
