= New Parliament Building, Zimbabwe =

Seat of the Parliament of Zimbabwe

New Parliament Building
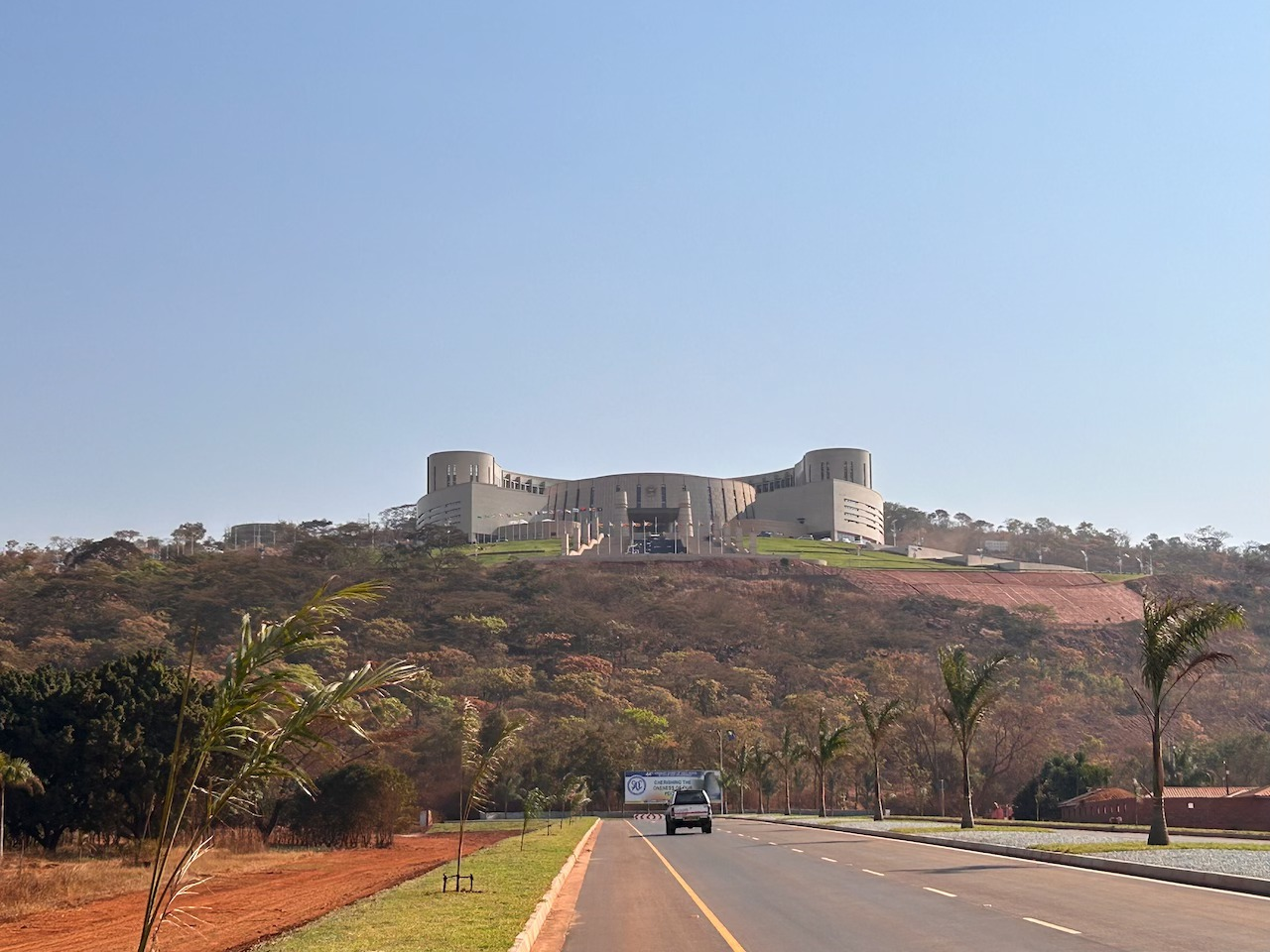
- New Parliament Building from Boulevard Road, August 2024

General information
- Type: Government offices and legislature
- Location: Mount Hampden, Mashonaland West Province, Zimbabwe
- Coordinates: 17°41′21″S 30°56′34″E
- Construction started: 28 September 2018
- Completed: 27 May 2022; 4 years ago
- Cost: US$200 million
- Client: Parliament of Zimbabwe

Technical details
- Floor count: 6
- Floor area: 33,000 square metres (355,209 sq ft)

Design and construction
- Architect: China SIPPR Engineering Group
- Main contractor: Shanghai Construction Group

New Parliament Building is the seat of the Parliament of Zimbabwe, located in Mount Hampden, Zimbabwe, built to replace the old Parliament House in Harare. The parliamentary chambers within the high-rise building can accommodate up to 650 legislators, their offices, conference rooms and meeting spaces. The engineering, procurement and construction (EPC) contract was awarded to Shanghai Construction Group, who erected the building between December 2018 and April 2022.

== Location ==
The building is located on a 5 hectares (12 acres) piece of land, in the community of Mount Hampden, in Mashonaland West Province, approximately 25 kilometres (16 mi) northwest of Harare, the capital and largest city in the country.

== Overview ==
Under construction since November 2018, the office complex consists of six floors, arranged in concentric circles around a central parliamentary chamber with a seating capacity of 650 people. When finished, the entire complex will comprise approximately 33,000 square metres (355,209 sq ft) of office space. Exterior surface parking for 800 vehicles will be provided in the development. The construction was funded with a US$140 million grant by the government of China to the Zimbabwean government.

== History ==
Zimbabwe's first parliamentary building was constructed in the late 19th century by the British South Africa Company for Rhodesia. That building had a capacity of 100 legislators. The old building was too small for the 350 legislators and estimated 248 support staff, as of July 2020. The idea of relocating parliament to this site was first conceived in 1983. The construction plans for the new building were approved in October 2017. Construction began in November 2018. Shanghai Construction Group, one of the largest construction companies in the world, was awarded the EPC contract at a monetary price of US$140 million. The building was constructed by the Chinese government as an infrastructure gift.

The completed and furnished parliament building complex was officially handed over by a Chinese government delegation to the government of Zimbabwe on 26 October 2023. The president of Zimbabwe, Emmerson Mnangagwa, received the building on behalf of his government and country. Originally valued at US$100 million, the value in September 2023 was reported as about US$200 million, by Zimbabwean media.

== Other developments ==
The government of Zimbabwe has ambitions to turn Mount Hampden into a satellite city of Harare by relocating the judiciary and government ministries to this location in the future. The new Zimbabwe Parliament Building is expected to stimulate the construction of new residences and commercial development in the neighborhood.

== See also ==
- Politics of Zimbabwe
- Harare
