= Mabel Chinomona =

Zimbabwean politician (born 1958)

The Honourable Mabel Chinomona
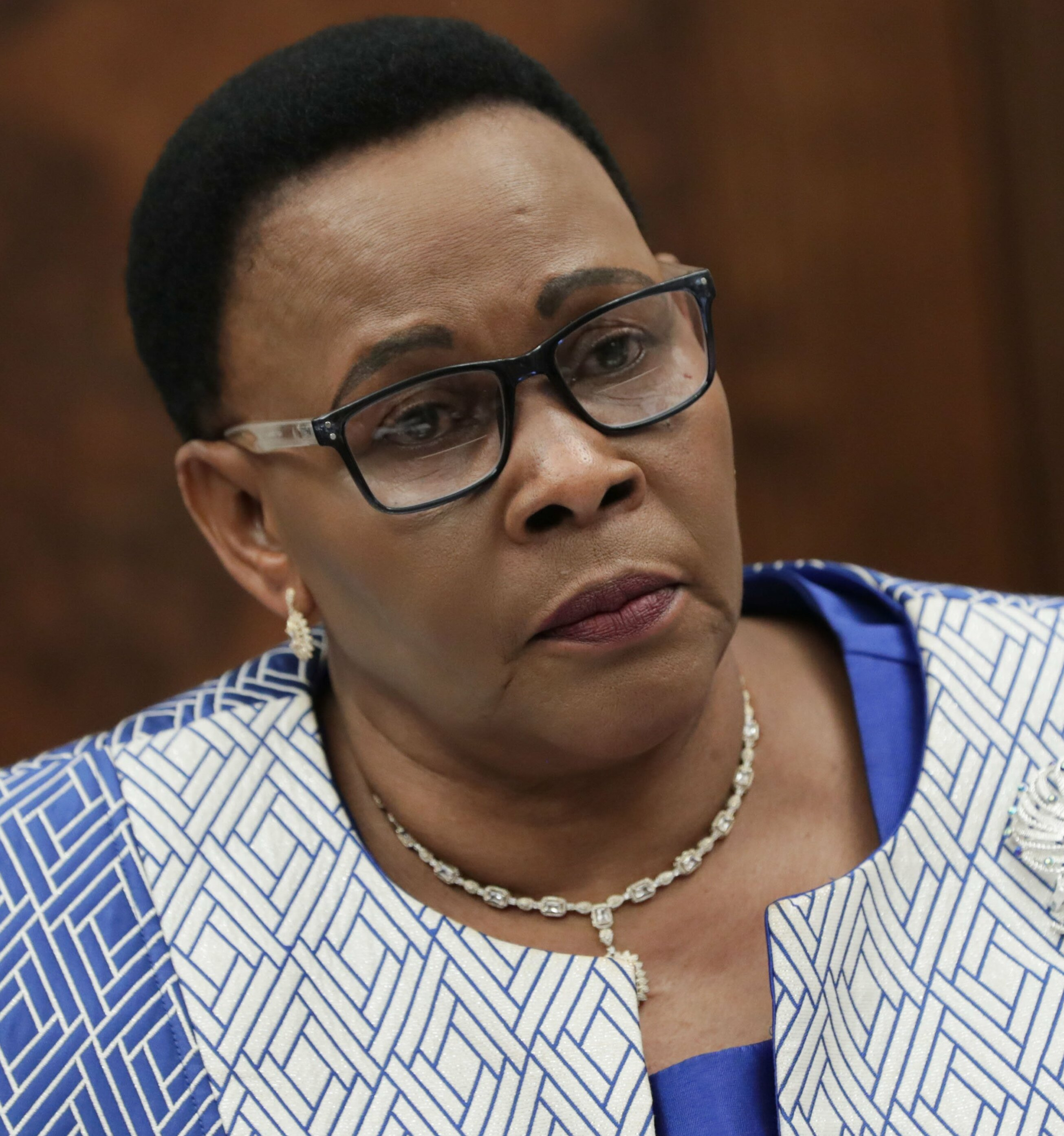
- Chinomona in 2023

President of the Senate of Zimbabwe
- Incumbent
- Assumed office 11 September 2018
- President: Emmerson Mnangagwa
- Deputy: Michael Reuben Nyambuya
- Preceded by: Edna Madzongwe

Deputy Speaker of the National Assembly of Zimbabwe
- In office 3 September 2013 – 29 July 2018
- Succeeded by: Tsitsi Gezi

Member of Parliament for Mutoko North
- In office 3 September 2013 – 11 September 2018
- Preceded by: David Chapfika
- Succeeded by: Rambidzai Nyabote

Personal details
- Born: 21 January 1958 (age 68)
- Party: ZANU–PF
- Children: 4

Mabel Memory Chinomona (born 21 January 1958) is a Zimbabwean politician who is the current president of the Senate of Zimbabwe. Previously, she served as deputy speaker of the National Assembly from 2013 to 2018, and as MP for Mutoko North until her election as senate president in 2018. She has also served as secretary of the ZANU–PF Women's League since 2017.

== Early life and education ==
Chinomona was born on 21 January 1958. She attended Nyamuzuwe High School, where she received her junior certificate, before going on to earn her Ordinary Levels at Murewa High School. She later went on to receive tertiary certificates from Speciss College and Kushinga Phikelela Polytechnic.

She joined the liberation movement in 1975 during the Rhodesian Bush War.

== Political career ==
After Zimbabwe's independence in 1980, Chinomona served as the ZANU–PF Women's League chairman for Mashonaland East Province. She served in that role until 1990, when she became political commissar. She was also involved in the Women's League as commissariat director. She also worked in the Ministry of Local Government for ten years, and served as Deputy Minister of Home Affairs.

In February 2016, while serving as provincial head of the Women's League in Mashonaland East, Chinomona was suspended from ZANU–PF in a vote of no confidence by the party's provincial coordinating committee. The reason given was that she had been neglectful in facilitating a planned trip by a group of Women's League members to Harare to meet President Robert Mugabe. However, the real reason was reportedly her association with Emmerson Mnangagwa's Lacoste political faction within the party. The influential party member Sydney Sekeramayi reportedly intervened on her behalf. After the vote of no confidence, she continued to serve in the Women's League, but this time as political commissar. After the 2017 Zimbabwean coup d'état, she clinched the Women's League's top office as secretary. As secretary, she is also automatically a member of the party's politburo.

In the 2013 general election, Chinomona was elected to Parliament for the Mutoko North constituency. She was sworn in on 3 September 2013, and was elected Deputy Speaker of the National Assembly. She was reelected as MP for Mutoko North in 2018, but vacated the seat when she was elected president of the Senate.

== Personal life ==
Chinomona is a widow and has two sons and two daughters.
