= Mount Hampden =

Administrative City in Mashonaland West, Zimbabwe

Mount Hampden City
- City
- Interactive map of Mount Hampden City
- Coordinates: 17.69°S 30.94°E
- Country: Zimbabwe
- Province: Mash West
- Settled: 1890 (136 years ago)
- Construction started: 2012 (14 years ago)

Government
  - Type: Ceremonial Mayor
  - Mayor: not elected yet

Area
  - Total: 39 sq mi (100 km^{2})
  - Land: 38 sq mi (99 km^{2})
  - Water: 0.39 sq mi (1 km^{2})
- Elevation: 4,812.9 ft (1,466.97 m)

Population (2023)
  - Total: 30,000 est.
  - Estimate (Sept. 2023): 30,000 est.
  - Rank: unranked
  - Density: 780/sq mi (300/km^{2})
  - Urban: 30,000 est.
  - Urban density: 780/sq mi (300/km^{2})
- Demonym: none
- Time zone: UTC+02:00 (CAT)
- ZIP Codes: 00000
- GDP (City, 2023): $2 million est.
- GMP (2023): refer to Harare Metro
- Largest suburbs by area: Mount Hampden Suburb (3 sq mi or 7.8 km^{2})
- Largest suburb by population: Mount Hampden Suburb (2023 est. 22,000)

Mount Hampden, sometimes called New Harare or Harare New City, is the parliamentary seat of Zimbabwe. It is located in Mashonaland West Province about 18 kilometres (11 mi) northwest of the capital, Harare. It was the original destination of the Pioneer Column of the British South Africa Company; however, the Column eventually settled in the south, in present-day Harare. Mount Hampden was named after English politician John Hampden by the hunter and explorer Frederick Courteney Selous.

Though Mount Hampden had been a farming community until 2012, urban decay in nearby Harare has led to recent government efforts to construct a new master-planned city supported by foreign investment, with a projected total cost of $60bn. Upon completion, the city is projected to be home to one million residents and expand to an area of 18,863 hectares. As of 2026, the majority of the city plan has yet to be implemented, with development still in an early phase.

== Recent developments ==
In 2012, the government of Zimbabwe under then-President Robert Mugabe announced plans to build a new parliament in Mount Hampden, replacing the previous parliament in Harare. In 2014, Mugabe travelled to China to negotiate and sign multiple agreements with the Chinese government for non-cash support in infrastructure development for the new parliament, but construction did not begin until 2016. Currently, the new parliamentary complex houses the New Zimbabwe Parliament Building, and will eventually include a presidential palace, the Supreme Court of Zimbabwe and the High Court of Zimbabwe, and the Reserve Bank of Zimbabwe; the larger planned city will also feature residential suburbs, hotels and modern shopping malls. After the move of Parliament to the newly completed New Zimbabwe Parliament Building in 2023, Mount Hampden became the parliamentary seat of Zimbabwe.

The design of Mount Hampden draws heavily from the garden city model: the city plan delineates a self-contained urban development with proportional areas of residences and industry, surrounded by green belts. It also incorporates smart city ideals in the form of high-rise towers, smart multimodal transport networks, and the incorporation of technology in urban spaces.

The construction of the new city has involved the contribution of many foreign actors. China's Shanghai Construction Group built the parliament complex, and the country handed over the building as an infrastructural gift to Zimbabwe in 2023. Zimbabwe has also sought aid from the China State Construction Engineering Corporation for technical expertise, technology, financing, and construction in the new city, though no official agreement has been signed. In 2023, Egypt signed a memorandum of understanding with Zimbabwe to contribute its expertise in planning, building, and managing the new city in Mount Hampden based on the urban model of Egypt's New Capital. The memorandum of understanding highlighted Egypt's infrastructural advising in the construction of roads, water and sanitation networks, energy facilities, and waste management strategies. Finally, the Swiss civil engineering and construction group Mabetex is constructing villas in Mount Hampden in collaboration between overseas Swiss experts and Zimbabwean locals. Mabetex has also provided billions of dollars in funding to build a new multi-purpose sports stadium in the new city.

=== Zim Cyber City ===
In 2022, President Mnangagwa signed an agreement with Dubai-based Mulk International to finance "Zim Cyber City", a $500m development project located within Mount Hampden. The main contractor for the project is Zimbabwean construction company Bitumen World, whose responsibilities involve the construction of roads, storm water drainage, and sewer reticulation. Other local companies such as Geosurd Consult provide ancillary services in the form of environmental impact assessments.

Zim Cyber City is purported to include luxury villas, office buildings, shopping malls, information technology hubs, free-trade zones, and Mulk Tower, potentially the tallest building in Africa. Its design takes many cues from Dubai's urban landscape, specifically looking to replicate the high-rise real estate row along Sheikh Zayed Road; Mnangagwa has even described the motivation behind the project as a desire to "replicate Dubai in Zimbabwe". The attraction of foreign investment in projects like Zim Cyber City is part of Zimbabwe's larger contemporary strategy of altering the business perception that the country has lately been characterized by inflation and economic collapse, as well as an attempt to boost the local economy through an increase in tourism.

== Reception ==
Locals and scholars alike have argued that Mount Hampden is an elitist project that caters to the wealthy rather than addressing the systemic issues of substandard housing, electricity shortages, deteriorating infrastructure, improper sanitation, and traffic congestion in Harare. The project is seen as a way to distance the elite from the issues of Harare at the cost of its low-income population. This is further evidenced by the 7,000 local residents who have been forcibly evicted from neighbouring sites to make way for development of the city, with inadequate relocation processes and recompensation schemes leaving nearly all of them unsheltered and uncompensated. Furthermore, the solutions Mount Hampden offers for urban crises are designed in a way that may create new problems or exacerbate existing ones. For example, though Mount Hampden's smart multimodal system claims it will eliminate all urban traffic, residents living in Harare and other nearby towns are likely to commute into the new city, creating a new set of traffic challenges.

As well as exacerbating inter-regional socioeconomic inequality and income disparity, critics have also raised concerns with inequalities that will manifest within the city as a consequence of designing Mount Hampden exclusively for high-income groups. The city's master plan allocates extensive space for high-income residential areas and limited middle-income residences, but provisions no low-income residential areas or housing. This spatial segregation is heightened by the gating of these residential areas, which critics fear may lead to privatization of public spaces with the effect of limiting access by other residents, especially those of lower income levels.

Critics also challenge the neoliberal planning ideals designed to make Mount Hampden globally competitive and attract foreign investment at the cost of local interests. The consequent overreliance on foreign capital for Zimbabwe's overall economic prosperity also results in exploitative acts by overseas investors and developers often going unpunished. High rates of unemployment in Zimbabwe and its international isolation have allowed Chinese development companies to propagate unsafe working conditions, involving inadequate protective equipment, meager salaries, and poor communication systems, with little pushback from the Zimbabwean government. Additionally, since foreign stakeholders control the finances of Mount Hampden, the city plan's principles have been centered around the importation of western planning ideals without the consideration of local factors unique to Zimbabwe, such as geographic variables and social norms, which critics believe could ultimately lower the quality of urban living. Even the name of the city has been criticized of being unsuitable to Zimbabwe's modern identity: being derived from a name of a British colonial, the name "Mount Hampden" has been accused of entrenching imperial history in a country that is actively promoting decolonization and indigenous sovereignty.

Zim Cyber City has faced particular criticism from digital rights activist groups who cite the lack of privacy afforded by surveillance technology in the smart development. Critics worry that facial recognition technology could be misused by law enforcement given the country's history of arbitrary arrests of protesters, political dissidents, and opposition activists. The securing of land for Zim Cyber City has also proved problematic. The development is located on the site of Turner Farm, which was home to thousands of residents prior to the announcement of the project. In 2024, the Zimbabwean government exhumed around 1,000 graves located on the project site with little notice and few alternative arrangements provided to affected residents. The threat of the forced displacement to make way for development has been looming over locals ever since.
