= Regianum Peak =

Mountain in Antarctica

Location of Brabant Island in the Antarctic Peninsula region.

Regianum Peak (Bulgarian: връх Регианум, romanized: vrah Regianum, IPA: [ˈvrɤx rɛɡiˈanom]) is the mostly ice-covered peak of elevation 855 m in the northeast part of Stribog Mountains on Brabant Island in the Palmer Archipelago, Antarctica. It surmounts Paré Glacier to the north and Laënnec Glacier to the south, and has its northern foothills connected to Stavertsi Ridge to the northeast by Viamata Saddle.

The peak is named after the ancient Roman fortress of Regianum in Northwestern Bulgaria.

== Location ==
Regianum Peak is located at 64°10′12″S 62°14′39″W, which is 2.27 km east by north of Blesna Peak, 4.25 km southwest of Mount Cabeza, 7.7 km west-northwest of Petroff Point and 5.9 km north-northwest of Opizo Peak. British mapping in 1980 and 2008.

== Maps ==
- Antarctic Digital Database (ADD). Scale 1:250000 topographic map of Antarctica. Scientific Committee on Antarctic Research (SCAR). Since 1993, regularly upgraded and updated.
- British Antarctic Territory. Scale 1:200000 topographic map. DOS 610 Series, Sheet W 64 62. Directorate of Overseas Surveys, Tolworth, UK, 1980.
- Brabant Island to Argentine Islands. Scale 1:250000 topographic map. British Antarctic Survey, 2008.
