= Kotlari Peak =

Mountain in Antarctica

Location of Brabant Island in the Antarctic Peninsula region.

Kotlari Peak (Bulgarian: връх Котлари, romanized: vrah Kotlari, IPA: [ˈvrɤx kotˈɫari]) is the mostly ice-covered peak of elevation 1152 m in the central part of Gutsal Ridge in Stribog Mountains on Brabant Island in the Palmer Archipelago, Antarctica. It has steep and partly ice-free southwest slopes, and surmounts Balanstra Glacier to the northeast and Hippocrates Glacier to the southwest.

The peak is named after the settlement of Kotlari in Southern Bulgaria.

== Location ==
Kotlari Peak is located at 64°20′38″S 62°20′46″W, which is 4.73 km southeast of Trambesh Peak, 8.64 km west-southwest of Momino Point, 1.88 km northwest of Zelenika Peak and 3 km northeast of Mount Imhotep. British mapping in 1980 and 2008.

== Maps ==
- Antarctic Digital Database (ADD). Scale 1:250000 topographic map of Antarctica. Scientific Committee on Antarctic Research (SCAR). Since 1993, regularly upgraded and updated.
- British Antarctic Territory. Scale 1:200000 topographic map. DOS 610 Series, Sheet W 64 62. Directorate of Overseas Surveys, Tolworth, UK, 1980.
- Brabant Island to Argentine Islands. Scale 1:250000 topographic map. British Antarctic Survey, 2008.
