= Mount Ghiuselev =

Mountain in Graham Land, Antarctica

Location of Brabant Island in the Antarctic Peninsula region.

Mount Ghiuselev (Bulgarian: Гюзелев връх, romanized: Gyuselev vrah, IPA: [ɟoˈzɛlɛv ˈvrɤx]) is the ice-covered mountain of elevation 1082 m in Avroleva Heights on Brabant Island in the Palmer Archipelago, Antarctica. It has steep and partly ice-free north and northwest slopes, and surmounts Mitev Glacier to the northwest, Pampa Passage to the southeast and Svetovrachene Glacier to the southwest.

The mountain is named after the Bulgarian opera singer Nicola Ghiuselev (1936–2014).

== Location ==
Mount Ghiuselev is located at 64°13′17″S 62°07′25″W, which is 4.16 km south-southwest of Petroff Point, 3.8 km west-southwest of Mitchell Point, 3.1 km north by east of Einthoven Hill and 3.2 km east by south of Opizo Peak. British mapping in 1980 and 2008.

== Maps ==
- Antarctic Digital Database (ADD). Scale 1:250000 topographic map of Antarctica. Scientific Committee on Antarctic Research (SCAR). Since 1993, regularly upgraded and updated.
- British Antarctic Territory. Scale 1:200000 topographic map. DOS 610 Series, Sheet W 64 62. Directorate of Overseas Surveys, Tolworth, UK, 1980.
- Brabant Island to Argentine Islands. Scale 1:250000 topographic map. British Antarctic Survey, 2008.
