= Zelenika Peak =

Peak on Brabant Island, Antarctica

Location of Brabant Island in the Antarctic Peninsula region.

Zelenika Peak (Bulgarian: връх Зеленика, romanized: vrah Zelenika, IPA: [ˈvrɤɣ zɛlɛˈnikɐ]) is the mostly ice-covered peak of elevation 991 m in the southeast part of Gutsal Ridge in Stribog Mountains on Brabant Island in the Palmer Archipelago, Antarctica. It has steep and partly ice-free southwest slopes, and surmounts Balanstra Glacier to the northeast and Hippocrates Glacier to the southwest.

The peak is named after the settlement of Zelenika in Northern Bulgaria.

== Location ==
Zelenika Peak is located at 64°21′17″S 62°18′59″W, which is 1.88 km southeast of Kotlari Peak, 7.15 km west of Pinel Point, 2.35 km northwest of Yunak Peak and 3.8 km east of Mount Imhotep. British mapping in 1980 and 2008.

== Maps ==
- Antarctic Digital Database (ADD). Scale 1:250000 topographic map of Antarctica. Scientific Committee on Antarctic Research (SCAR). Since 1993, regularly upgraded and updated.
- British Antarctic Territory. Scale 1:200000 topographic map. DOS 610 Series, Sheet W 64 62. Directorate of Overseas Surveys, Tolworth, UK, 1980.
- Brabant Island to Argentine Islands. Scale 1:250000 topographic map. British Antarctic Survey, 2008.
