= Yunak Peak =

Mountain in Antarctica

Location of Brabant Island in the Antarctic Peninsula region.

Yunak Peak (Bulgarian: връх Юнак, romanized: vrah Yunak, IPA: [ˈvrɤx joˈnak]) is the ice-covered peak of elevation 570 m at the southeast extremity of Gutsal Ridge in Stribog Mountains on Brabant Island in the Palmer Archipelago, Antarctica. It has steep and partly ice-free southwest and south slopes, and surmounts Buls Bay to the southeast and Hippocrates Glacier to the west.

The peak is named after the settlement of Yunak in Northeastern Bulgaria.

== Location ==
Yunak Peak is located at 64°22′20″S 62°17′20″W, which is 2.35 km southeast of Zelenika Peak, 3.8 km northwest of Terrada Point and 5.18 km east-southeast of Mount Imhotep. British mapping in 1980 and 2008.

== Maps ==
- Antarctic Digital Database (ADD). Scale 1:250000 topographic map of Antarctica. Scientific Committee on Antarctic Research (SCAR). Since 1993, regularly upgraded and updated.
- British Antarctic Territory. Scale 1:200000 topographic map. DOS 610 Series, Sheet W 64 62. Directorate of Overseas Surveys, Tolworth, UK, 1980.
- Brabant Island to Argentine Islands. Scale 1:250000 topographic map. British Antarctic Survey, 2008.
