= Viamata Saddle =

Location of Brabant Island in the Antarctic Peninsula region.

Viamata Saddle (Bulgarian: седловина Виамата, ‘Sedlovina Viamata’ \se-dlo-vi-'na vi-a-'ma-ta\) is the ice-covered saddle of elevation 658 m on Brabant Island in the Palmer Archipelago, Antarctica, connecting Stavertsi Ridge on the east-northeast to Stribog Mountains on the west-southwest. It is part of the glacial divide between Paré Glacier to the northwest and a part of the ice cap draining east-southeastwards into Hill Bay.

The saddle is named after the ancient Roman station of Viamata in Southern Bulgaria.

== Location ==
Viamata Saddle is located at 64°09′42″S 62°14′15″W, which is 6.53 km south-southeast of Virchow Hill, 3.35 km southwest of Mount Cabeza, 7.67 km west-northwest of Petroff Point and 1 km north-northeast of Regianum Peak. British mapping in 1980 and 2008.

== Maps ==
- Antarctic Digital Database (ADD). Scale 1:250000 topographic map of Antarctica. Scientific Committee on Antarctic Research (SCAR). Since 1993, regularly upgraded and updated.
- British Antarctic Territory. Scale 1:200000 topographic map. DOS 610 Series, Sheet W 64 62. Directorate of Overseas Surveys, Tolworth, UK, 1980.
- Brabant Island to Argentine Islands. Scale 1:250000 topographic map. British Antarctic Survey, 2008.
