= Trambesh Peak =

Mountain in Antarctica

Location of Brabant Island in the Antarctic Peninsula region.

Trambesh Peak (Bulgarian: връх Тръмбеш, romanized: vrah Trambesh, IPA: [ˈvrɤx trɐmˈbɛʃ]) is the ice-covered peak of elevation 1574 m at the northwest extremity of Gutsal Ridge in Stribog Mountains on Brabant Island in the Palmer Archipelago, Antarctica. It surmounts the heads of Balanstra Glacier to the east and Hippocrates Glacier to the southwest.

The peak is named after the town of Polski Trambesh, and the settlements of Gorski Goren Trambesh and Gorski Dolen Trambesh in Northern Bulgaria.

== Location ==
Trambesh Peak is located at 64°18′36″S 62°24′18″W, which is 5.5 km south of Mount Parry, 4.73 km northwest of Kotlari Peak, 5.74 km north of Mount Imhotep and 7.95 km northeast of Mount Sarnegor. British mapping in 1980 and 2008.

== Maps ==
- Antarctic Digital Database (ADD). Scale 1:250000 topographic map of Antarctica. Scientific Committee on Antarctic Research (SCAR). Since 1993, regularly upgraded and updated.
- British Antarctic Territory. Scale 1:200000 topographic map. DOS 610 Series, Sheet W 64 62. Directorate of Overseas Surveys, Tolworth, UK, 1980.
- Brabant Island to Argentine Islands. Scale 1:250000 topographic map. British Antarctic Survey, 2008.
