= Blesna Peak =

Mountain range in Antarctica

Location of Brabant Island in the Antarctic Peninsula region.

Blesna Peak (Bulgarian: връх Блесна, romanized: vrah Blesna, IPA: [ˈvrɤɣ ˈblɛsnɐ]) is the ice-covered peak of elevation 1261 m in the northeast part of Stribog Mountains on Brabant Island in the Palmer Archipelago, Antarctica. It surmounts Paré Glacier to the west and north, and Laënnec Glacier to the southeast. The peak is named after the medieval fortress of Blesna in Southern Bulgaria.

== Location ==
Blesna Peak is located at 64°10′23″S 62°17′25″W, which is 7.4 km east of Mount Rokitansky, 7.15 km south of Virchow Hill, 6.12 km southwest of Mount Cabeza, 9.82 km west by north of Petroff Point and 6.95 km northwest of Opizo Peak. It underwent British mapping in 1980 and again in 2008.

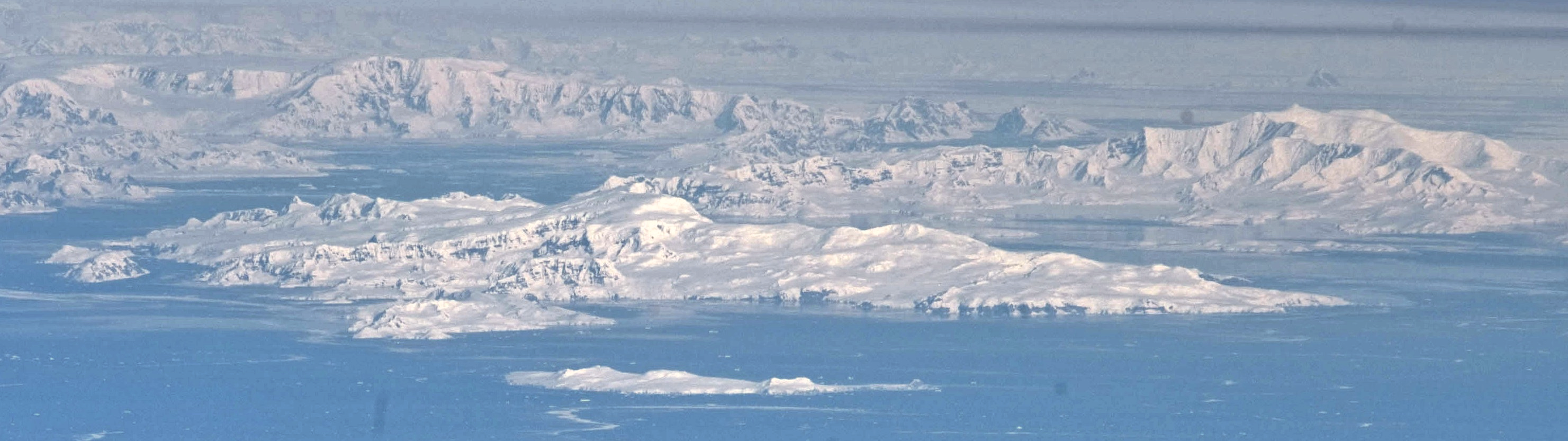
Brabant Island seen from northeast, with Anvers Island (on the right) and Antarctic Peninsula in the background; Stribog Mountains occupy most of the central and the right, near part of the island.
