= Venchan Bluff =

1,283m bluff in the Palmer Archipelago, Antarctica

Location of Brabant Island in the Antarctic Peninsula region.

Venchan Bluff (Bulgarian: рид Венчан, romanized: rid Venchan, IPA: [ˈrid vɛnˈt͡ʃan]) is the mostly ice-covered bluff rising to 1283 m at the end of a side ridge extending towards Lanusse Bay from Mount Parry in Stribog Mountains on Brabant Island in the Palmer Archipelago, Antarctica. It has steep and partly ice-free southwest, northwest and northeast slopes, and surmounts Djerassi Glacier to the north.

Venchan Bluff was first ascended by the French mountaineers Mathieu Cortial, Lionel Daudet and Patrick Wagnon on 21 January 2010, as a part of their route to the island's summit Mount Parry following its northwestern spur and called Nouvelle vague (New Wave).

The peak is named after the settlement of Venchan in Northeastern Bulgaria.

== Location ==
Venchan Bluff is located at 64°14′54″S 62°26′45″W, which is 2.46 km northwest of Mount Parry, 3.85 km east-northeast of Minot Point and 6.3 km southeast of Driencourt Point. British mapping in 1980 and 2008.

== Maps ==
- Antarctic Digital Database (ADD). Scale 1:250000 topographic map of Antarctica. Scientific Committee on Antarctic Research (SCAR). Since 1993, regularly upgraded and updated.
- British Antarctic Territory. Scale 1:200000 topographic map. DOS 610 Series, Sheet W 64 62. Directorate of Overseas Surveys, Tolworth, UK, 1980.
- Brabant Island to Argentine Islands. Scale 1:250000 topographic map. British Antarctic Survey, 2008.
