= Gorichane Glacier =

Glacier in Palmer Archipelago, Antarctica

- Location of Brabant Island in the Antarctic Peninsula region

- Location within Antarctica
- Location: Palmer Archipelago
- Coordinates: 64°12′00″S 62°25′40″W
- Length: 2 nmi (4 km; 2 mi)
- Width: 1 nmi (2 km; 1 mi)
- Thickness: unknown
- Terminus: Lanusse Bay
- Status: unknown

Gorichane Glacier (Bulgarian: ледник Горичане, romanized: lednik Gorichane, IPA: [ˈlɛdniɡ ɡoˈrit͡ʃɐnɛ]) is the 4.5 km long and 1.7 km wide glacier on Brabant Island in the Palmer Archipelago, Antarctica, situated east-southeast of Palilula Glacier, southwest of the head of Paré Glacier, west-northwest of the head of Laënnec Glacier, northwest of the head of Malpighi Glacier and north of Djerassi Glacier. It drains the west slopes of central Stribog Mountains and flows southwestwards into Lanusse Bay east of Baykal Point.

The glacier is named after the settlement of Gorichane in Northeastern Bulgaria.

== Location ==
Gorichane Glacier is centred at 64°12′00″S 62°25′40″W. British mapping in 1980 and 2008.

== See also ==
- List of glaciers in the Antarctic
- Glaciology

== Maps ==
- Antarctic Digital Database (ADD). Scale 1:250000 topographic map of Antarctica. Scientific Committee on Antarctic Research (SCAR). Since 1993, regularly upgraded and updated.
- British Antarctic Territory. Scale 1:200000 topographic map. DOS 610 Series, Sheet W 64 62. Directorate of Overseas Surveys, Tolworth, UK, 1980.
- Brabant Island to Argentine Islands. Scale 1:250000 topographic map. British Antarctic Survey, 2008.
