= Harvey Heights (Antarctica) =

Mountains in Antarctica

Location of Brabant Island in the Antarctic Peninsula region.

The Harvey Heights (64°14′S 62°24′W) are a series of elevations close north of Mount Parry, part of the main crest of central Stribog Mountains on Brabant Island in the Palmer Archipelago, Antarctica. They have steep and partly ice-free west slopes, and surmount Paré Glacier to the north, Laënnec Glacier to the northeast, Malpighi and Mackenzie Glaciers to the southeast, Djerassi Glacier to the west and Gorichane Glacier to the northwest.

The heights were shown on an Argentine government chart in 1953, but not named. The feature was photographed by Hunting Aerosurveys Ltd in 1956–57, and mapped from these photos in 1959, and was named by the UK Antarctic Place-Names Committee for William Harvey, an English physician who first demonstrated the circulation of the blood.

== Maps ==
- Antarctic Digital Database (ADD). Scale 1:250000 topographic map of Antarctica. Scientific Committee on Antarctic Research (SCAR). Since 1993, regularly upgraded and updated.
- British Antarctic Territory. Scale 1:200000 topographic map. DOS 610 Series, Sheet W 64 62. Directorate of Overseas Surveys, Tolworth, UK, 1980.
- Brabant Island to Argentine Islands. Scale 1:250000 topographic map. British Antarctic Survey, 2008.
