= Palilula Glacier =

Glacier in Palmer Archipelago, Antarctica

- Location of Brabant Island in the Antarctic Peninsula region

- Location within Antarctica
- Location: Palmer Archipelago
- Coordinates: 64°11′10″S 62°28′30″W
- Length: 2 nmi (4 km; 2 mi)
- Width: 0.5 nmi (1 km; 1 mi)
- Thickness: unknown
- Terminus: Lanusse Bay
- Status: unknown

Palilula Glacier (Bulgarian: ледник Палилула, romanized: lednik Palilula, IPA: [ˈlɛdnik pɐˈliɫoɫɐ]) is the 4 km long and 1.1 km wide steep valley glacier on Brabant Island in the Palmer Archipelago, Antarctica, situated south of Ralitsa Glacier, southwest of Paré Glacier and northwest of Gorichane Glacier. It drains the southwest slopes of Mount Rokitansky in Stribog Mountains, and flows south-southwestwards into Lanusse Bay east of Driencourt Point and northwest of Baykal Point.

The glacier is named after the settlement of Palilula in Northwestern Bulgaria.

== Location ==
Palilula Glacier is centred at 64°11′10″S 62°28′30″W. British mapping in 1980 and 2008.

== See also ==
- List of glaciers in the Antarctic
- Glaciology

== Maps ==
- Antarctic Digital Database (ADD). Scale 1:250000 topographic map of Antarctica. Scientific Committee on Antarctic Research (SCAR). Since 1993, regularly upgraded and updated.
- British Antarctic Territory. Scale 1:200000 topographic map. DOS 610 Series, Sheet W 64 62. Directorate of Overseas Surveys, Tolworth, UK, 1980.
- Brabant Island to Argentine Islands. Scale 1:250000 topographic map. British Antarctic Survey, 2008.
