= Taran Plateau =

Plateau in Antarctica

Location of Brabant Island in the Antarctic Peninsula region.

Taran Plateau (Bulgarian: Търънско плато, ‘Taransko Plato’ \t&-'r&n-sko 'pla-to\) is the ice-covered plateau of elevation 1100 to 1700 m on the east side of Harvey Heights in Stribog Mountains on Brabant Island in the Palmer Archipelago, Antarctica. It extends 5.5 km in east-west direction and 3.3 km in north-south direction, and is bounded by Laënnec Glacier on the north, Svetovrachene Glacier on the east and south, and the head of Malpighi Glacier on the southwest. The feature is connected to Avroleva Heights to the east by Doriones Saddle, and has its southwest part abutted by Basarbovo Ridge. It has steep and partly ice-free north slopes and small parts of the southeast and southwest slopes.

The plateau is named after the settlement of Taran in Southern Bulgaria.

== Location ==
Taran Plateau is centred at 64°14′00″S 62°15′00″W. British mapping in 1980 and 2008.

== Maps ==
- Antarctic Digital Database (ADD). Scale 1:250000 topographic map of Antarctica. Scientific Committee on Antarctic Research (SCAR). Since 1993, regularly upgraded and updated.
- British Antarctic Territory. Scale 1:200000 topographic map. DOS 610 Series, Sheet W 64 62. Directorate of Overseas Surveys, Tolworth, UK, 1980.
- Brabant Island to Argentine Islands. Scale 1:250000 topographic map. British Antarctic Survey, 2008.
