= Doriones Saddle =

Location of Brabant Island in the Antarctic Peninsula region.

Doriones Saddle (Bulgarian: седловина Дорионес, ‘Sedlovina Doriones’ \se-dlo-vi-'na do-ri-'o-nes\) is the ice-covered saddle of elevation 962 m (3,156 ft) on Brabant Island in the Palmer Archipelago, Antarctica, connecting Avroleva Heights on the east to Taran Plateau in Stribog Mountains on the west. It is part of the glacial divide between Laënnec Glacier to the north and Svetovrachene Glacier to the south.

The saddle is named after the ancient Roman station of Doriones in Western Bulgaria.

== Location ==
Doriones Saddle is located at 64°13′15″S 62°12′05″W, which is 730 m (2,400 ft) west-southwest of Opizo Peak, 10.8 km (6.7 mi) northeast of Mount Parry and 6.85 km (4.26 mi) southeast of Blesna Peak. British mapping in 1980 and 2008.

== Maps ==
- Antarctic Digital Database (ADD). Scale 1:250000 topographic map of Antarctica. Scientific Committee on Antarctic Research (SCAR). Since 1993, regularly upgraded and updated.
- British Antarctic Territory. Scale 1:200000 topographic map. DOS 610 Series, Sheet W 64 62. Directorate of Overseas Surveys, Tolworth, UK, 1980.
- Brabant Island to Argentine Islands. Scale 1:250000 topographic map. British Antarctic Survey, 2008.
