= Hvarchil Point =

Location of Brabant Island in the Antarctic Peninsula region.

Hvarchil Point (Bulgarian: нос Хвърчил, ‘Nos Hvarchil’ \'nos hv&r-'chil\) is the ice-covered point forming the southwest extremity of Lecointe Island off the east coast of Brabant Island in the Palmer Archipelago, Antarctica.

The point is named after the settlement of Hvarchil in Western Bulgaria.

== Location ==
Hvarchil Point is located at 64°17′04″S 62°05′55″W, which is 8.08 km south-southwest of Mitchell Point, 7.25 km southwest of Cape Kaiser, 5.15 km northeast of Momino Point and 2.7 km east of Bov Point. British mapping in 1980 and 2008.

== Maps ==
- Antarctic Digital Database (ADD). Scale 1:250000 topographic map of Antarctica. Scientific Committee on Antarctic Research (SCAR). Since 1993, regularly upgraded and updated.
- British Antarctic Territory. Scale 1:200000 topographic map. DOS 610 Series, Sheet W 64 62. Directorate of Overseas Surveys, Tolworth, UK, 1980.
- Brabant Island to Argentine Islands. Scale 1:250000 topographic map. British Antarctic Survey, 2008.
