= Grigorov Glacier =

Glacier in Antarctica

- Location of Brabant Island in the Antarctic Peninsula region

- Location within Antarctica
- Location: Palmer Archipelago
- Coordinates: 64°09′05″S 62°07′30″W
- Length: 1 nmi (2 km; 1 mi)
- Width: 0.7 nmi (1 km; 1 mi)
- Thickness: unknown
- Terminus: Hill Bay
- Status: unknown

Grigorov Glacier (Bulgarian: Григоров ледник, romanized: Grigorov lednik, IPA: [ɡriˈɡɔrof ˈlɛdnik]) is a glacier 1.8 km long and 1.3 km wide on the south side of Stavertsi Ridge on Albena Peninsula, Brabant Island in the Palmer Archipelago, Antarctica. It drains the east slopes of Mount Cabeza and flows southeastwards to enter Hill Bay west of Kostur Point.

The glacier is named after the Bulgarian scientist Stamen Grigorov (1878–1945) who discovered the bacteria Lactobacillus bulgaricus used in the production of yoghurt.

== Location ==
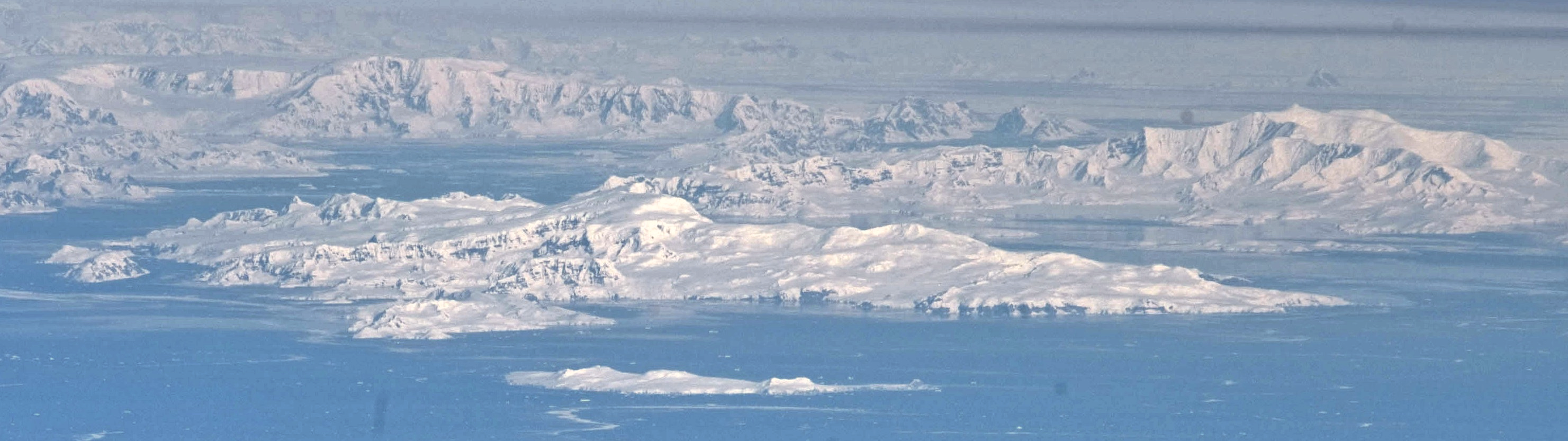
Brabant Island from northeast, with Anvers Island (on the right) and Antarctic Peninsula in the background.

Grigorov Glacier is located at 64°09′05″S 62°07′30″W. British mapping in 1980.

== See also ==
- List of glaciers in the Antarctic
- Glaciology

== Maps ==
- Antarctic Digital Database (ADD). Scale 1:250000 topographic map of Antarctica. Scientific Committee on Antarctic Research (SCAR). Since 1993, regularly upgraded and updated.
- British Antarctic Territory. Scale 1:200000 topographic map. DOS 610 Series, Sheet W 64 62. Directorate of Overseas Surveys, Tolworth, UK, 1980.
- Brabant Island to Argentine Islands. Scale 1:250000 topographic map. British Antarctic Survey, 2008.
