= Pirogov Glacier =

Glacier in Antarctica

- Location of Brabant Island in the Antarctic Peninsula region

- Location within Antarctica
- Location: Palmer Archipelago
- Coordinates: 64°16′40″S 62°28′30″W
- Length: 3 nmi (6 km; 3 mi)
- Width: 1 nmi (2 km; 1 mi)
- Thickness: unknown
- Terminus: Dallmann Bay
- Status: unknown

Pirogov Glacier (Bulgarian: Пирогов ледник, romanized: Pirogov lednik, IPA: [piroˈɡɔf ˈlɛdnik]) is a 5 km long and 1.5 km wide glacier situated south of Djerassi Glacier, west of the head of Mackenzie Glacier and northwest of Balanstra Glacier on Brabant Island in the Palmer Archipelago, Antarctica. It drains the south-southwest slopes of Mount Parry and flows westwards to enter Dallmann Bay south of Minot Point.

The glacier is named for the Russian scientist and surgeon Nikolay Pirogov (1810-1881) who developed modern health care in Bulgaria during the 1877-78 Russo-Turkish War.

== Location ==
Pirogov Glacier is centred at 64°16′40″S 62°28′30″W. British mapping in 1980 and 2008.

== See also ==
- List of glaciers in the Antarctic
- Glaciology

== Maps ==
- Antarctic Digital Database (ADD). Scale 1:250000 topographic map of Antarctica. Scientific Committee on Antarctic Research (SCAR). Since 1993, regularly upgraded and updated.
- British Antarctic Territory. Scale 1:200000 topographic map. DOS 610 Series, Sheet W 64 62. Directorate of Overseas Surveys, Tolworth, UK, 1980.
- Brabant Island to Argentine Islands. Scale 1:250000 topographic map. British Antarctic Survey, 2008.
