= Chumerna Glacier =

Glacier in Antarctica

- Location of Brabant Island in the Antarctic Peninsula region

- Location within Antarctica
- Location: Palmer Archipelago
- Coordinates: 64°08′10″S 62°06′20″W
- Length: 1.1 nmi (2 km; 1 mi)
- Width: 1 nmi (2 km; 1 mi)
- Thickness: unknown
- Terminus: east of Hales Peak
- Status: unknown

Chumerna Glacier (Bulgarian: ледник Чумерна, romanized: lednik Chumerna, IPA: [ˈlɛdnik t͡ʃoˈmɛrnɐ]) is the 2.2 km long and 1.9 km wide glacier draining the north slopes of Stavertsi Ridge on Albena Peninsula, Brabant Island in the Palmer Archipelago, Antarctica. It flows northeastwards to enter the channel between Brabant Island and Liège Island east of Hales Peak.

The glacier is named after Chumerna Peak in eastern Balkan Mountains, Bulgaria.

== Location ==
Chumerna Glacier is centred at 64°08′10″S 62°06′20″W. British mapping in 1980.

== See also ==
- List of glaciers in the Antarctic
- Glaciology

== Maps ==
- Antarctic Digital Database (ADD). Scale 1:250000 topographic map of Antarctica. Scientific Committee on Antarctic Research (SCAR). Since 1993, regularly upgraded and updated.
- British Antarctic Territory. Scale 1:200000 topographic map. DOS 610 Series, Sheet W 64 62. Directorate of Overseas Surveys, Tolworth, UK, 1980.
- Brabant Island to Argentine Islands. Scale 1:250000 topographic map. British Antarctic Survey, 2008.
