= Kostur =

Kostur may refer to:

== Places ==
- Kostur, Bulgaria
- Kostur (Pirot), Serbia
- Kostur Point, Antarctica
- Kastoria, Greece

== Other ==
- Kostur dialect
- Matúš Kostúr (born 1980), Slovak ice hockey player
