= Basarbovo Ridge =

Ridge on Brabant Island, Antarctica

Location of Brabant Island in the Antarctic Peninsula region.

Basarbovo Ridge (Bulgarian: Басарбовски рид, ‘Basarbovski Rid’ \ba-'sar-bov-ski 'rid\) is the ice-covered ridge rising to 1421 m on the east side of the Stribog Mountains on Brabant Island in the Palmer Archipelago, Antarctica. It extends 10.4 km from Taran Plateau to the northwest to Bov Point to the southeast. It has steep and partly ice-free southwest slopes, and surmounts Malpighi Glacier to the southwest and Svetovrachene Glacier to the northeast.

The ridge is named after the settlement of Basarbovo in Northeastern Bulgaria.

== Location ==
Basarbovo Ridge is centred at 64°15′55″S 62°13′20″W. British mapping in 1980 and 2008.

== Maps ==
- Antarctic Digital Database (ADD). Scale 1:250000 topographic map of Antarctica. Scientific Committee on Antarctic Research (SCAR). Since 1993, regularly upgraded and updated.
- British Antarctic Territory. Scale 1:200000 topographic map. DOS 610 Series, Sheet W 64 62. Directorate of Overseas Surveys, Tolworth, UK, 1980.
- Brabant Island to Argentine Islands. Scale 1:250000 topographic map. British Antarctic Survey, 2008.
