= Baykal Point =

Location of Brabant Island in the Antarctic Peninsula region.

Baykal Point (Bulgarian: нос Байкал, ‘Nos Baykal’ \'nos bay-'kal\) is the mostly ice-covered rocky point projecting 800 m south-southwestwards into Lanusse Bay on the west coast of Brabant Island in the Palmer Archipelago, Antarctica.

The point is named after the settlements of Baykal in Northern and Baykalsko in Western Bulgaria.

== Location ==
Baykal Point is located at 64°12′50″S 62°29′06″W, which is 2.63 km east-southeast of Driencourt Point, 6.55 km northwest of Mount Parry and 5.4 km north-northeast of Minot Point. British mapping in 1980 and 2008.

== Maps ==
- Antarctic Digital Database (ADD). Scale 1:250000 topographic map of Antarctica. Scientific Committee on Antarctic Research (SCAR). Since 1993, regularly upgraded and updated.
- British Antarctic Territory. Scale 1:200000 topographic map. DOS 610 Series, Sheet W 64 62. Directorate of Overseas Surveys, Tolworth, UK, 1980.
- Brabant Island to Argentine Islands. Scale 1:250000 topographic map. British Antarctic Survey, 2008.
