= Kayak Bay =

Bay in Antarctica

Location of Brabant Island in the Antarctic Peninsula region.

Kayak Bay (64°18′S 62°13′W) is a bay, 1.5 nautical miles (3 km) wide, on the inner (west) side of Pampa Passage, indenting the east coast of Brabant Island in the Palmer Archipelago in Antarctica north of Momino Point and south of Bov Point. Malpighi Glacier and Mackenzie Glacier flow into the bay.

The feature was roughly mapped in 1898 by the Belgian Antarctic Expedition. It was mapped in greater detail by Argentine expeditions from 1947–48 onward and included as part of "Bahia Pampa" (now Pampa Passage). This bay was so named by the UK Antarctic Place-Names Committee in 1986 in reference to the sea canoes of the British Joint Services Expedition that passed through the bay on a circumnavigation of Brabant Island in February 1985.

== Maps ==
- Antarctic Digital Database (ADD). Scale 1:250000 topographic map of Antarctica. Scientific Committee on Antarctic Research (SCAR). Since 1993, regularly upgraded and updated.
- British Antarctic Territory. Scale 1:200000 topographic map. DOS 610 Series, Sheet W 64 62. Directorate of Overseas Surveys, Tolworth, UK, 1980.
- Brabant Island to Argentine Islands. Scale 1:250000 topographic map. British Antarctic Survey, 2008.
