= Opizo Peak =

Mountain in Antarctica

Location of Brabant Island in the Antarctic Peninsula region.

Opizo Peak (Bulgarian: връх Опизо, romanized: vrah Opizo, IPA: [ˈvrɤx oˈpizo]) is the mostly ice-covered peak of elevation 1137 m near the west extremity of Avroleva Heights on Brabant Island in the Palmer Archipelago, Antarctica. It has steep and partly ice-free north-northeast slopes, and surmounts Mitev Glacier to the northeast, Svetovrachene Glacier to the south and Doriones Saddle to the west-southwest.

The peak is named after the ancient Roman station of Opizo in Southern Bulgaria.

== Location ==
Opizo Peak is located at 64°13′02″S 62°11′20″W, which is 5.84 km southwest of Petroff Point, 3.2 km west by north of Mount Ghiuselev and 11.5 km northeast of Mount Parry. British mapping in 1980 and 2008.

== Maps ==
- Antarctic Digital Database (ADD). Scale 1:250000 topographic map of Antarctica. Scientific Committee on Antarctic Research (SCAR). Since 1993, regularly upgraded and updated.
- British Antarctic Territory. Scale 1:200000 topographic map. DOS 610 Series, Sheet W 64 62. Directorate of Overseas Surveys, Tolworth, UK, 1980.
- Brabant Island to Argentine Islands. Scale 1:250000 topographic map. British Antarctic Survey, 2008.
