= Svetovrachene Glacier =

Glacier in Palmer Archipelago, Antarctica

- Location of Brabant Island in the Antarctic Peninsula region

- Location within Antarctica
- Location: Palmer Archipelago
- Coordinates: 64°15′30″S 62°11′00″W
- Length: 4 nmi (7 km; 5 mi)
- Width: 2 nmi (4 km; 2 mi)
- Thickness: unknown
- Terminus: Pampa Passage
- Status: unknown

Svetovrachene Glacier (Bulgarian: ледник Световрачене, romanized: lednik Svetovrachene, IPA: [ˈlɛdnik svɛtoˈvrat͡ʃɛnɛ]) is the 7.5 km long and 4 km wide glacier on Brabant Island in the Palmer Archipelago, Antarctica situated northeast of lower Malpighi Glacier, southeast of Laënnec Glacier and south of Mitev Glacier. It drains the east and south slopes of Taran Plateau and the south slopes of Avroleva Heights, flows southeastwards between Basarbovo Ridge and Einthoven Hill, and enters Pampa Passage northeast of Bov Point.

The glacier is named after the settlement of Svetovrachene in Western Bulgaria.

== Location ==
Svetovrachene Glacier is centred at 64°15′30″S 62°11′00″W. British mapping in 1980 and 2008.

== See also ==
- List of glaciers in the Antarctic
- Glaciology

== Maps ==
- Antarctic Digital Database (ADD). Scale 1:250000 topographic map of Antarctica. Scientific Committee on Antarctic Research (SCAR). Since 1993, regularly upgraded and updated.
- British Antarctic Territory. Scale 1:200000 topographic map. DOS 610 Series, Sheet W 64 62. Directorate of Overseas Surveys, Tolworth, UK, 1980.
- Brabant Island to Argentine Islands. Scale 1:250000 topographic map. British Antarctic Survey, 2008.
