= Zelenika =

Zelenika may refer to:

- Zelenika Peak, Antarctica
- Zelenika, Živinice, a village in Živinice, Bosnia and Herzegovina
- Zelenika, Gabrovo Province, Bulgaria
- Zelenika, Herceg Novi, Montenegro
