= Kostur Point =

Point in the Palmer Archipelago, Antarctica

Location of Brabant Island in the Antarctic Peninsula region.

Kostur Point (Bulgarian: нос Костур, ‘Nos Kostur’ \'nos kos-'tur\) is the point on the east coast of Brabant Island in the Palmer Archipelago, Antarctica projecting 1.4 km southwards into Hill Bay.

The point is named after the settlement of Kostur in southeastern Bulgaria.

== Location ==
Kostur Point is located at 64°09′55″S 62°03′56″W which is 4.2 km southwest of Spallanzani Point and 2.7 km north-northeast of Petroff Point. British mapping in 1980.

== Maps ==
- Antarctic Digital Database (ADD). Scale 1:250000 topographic map of Antarctica. Scientific Committee on Antarctic Research (SCAR). Since 1993, regularly upgraded and updated.
- British Antarctic Territory. Scale 1:200000 topographic map. DOS 610 Series, Sheet W 64 62. Directorate of Overseas Surveys, Tolworth, UK, 1980.
- Brabant Island to Argentine Islands. Scale 1:250000 topographic map. British Antarctic Survey, 2008.
