= Djerassi Glacier =

Glacier in Palmer Archipelago, Antarctica

- Location of Brabant Island in the Antarctic Peninsula region

- Location within Antarctica
- Location: Palmer Archipelago
- Coordinates: 64°14′10″S 62°26′00″W
- Length: 1.5 nmi (3 km; 2 mi)
- Width: 0.5 nmi (1 km; 1 mi)
- Thickness: unknown
- Terminus: Lanusse Bay
- Status: unknown

Djerassi Glacier (Bulgarian: ледник Джераси, romanized: lednik Dzherasi, IPA: [ˈlɛdniɡ d͡ʒɛˈrasi]) is a 2.8 km long and 1 km wide steep valley glacier situated south of Gorichane Glacier, west of the head of Malpighi Glacier, northwest of the head of Mackenzie Glacier, and north-northeast of Pirogov Glacier on Brabant Island in the Palmer Archipelago, Antarctica. It drains the west slopes of Harvey Heights and the north slopes of Mount Parry, and flows northwestwards into Lanusse Bay north of Venchan Bluff.

The glacier is named for the Bulgarian-American scientist Carl Djerassi (1923–2015), a co-inventor of the oral contraceptive pill.

== Location ==
Djerassi Glacier is centred at 64°14′10″S 62°26′00″W. British mapping in 1980.

== See also ==
- List of glaciers in the Antarctic
- Glaciology

== Maps ==
- Antarctic Digital Database (ADD). Scale 1:250000 topographic map of Antarctica. Scientific Committee on Antarctic Research (SCAR). Since 1993, regularly upgraded and updated.
- British Antarctic Territory. Scale 1:200000 topographic map. DOS 610 Series, Sheet W 64 62. Directorate of Overseas Surveys, Tolworth, UK, 1980.
- Brabant Island to Argentine Islands. Scale 1:250000 topographic map. British Antarctic Survey, 2008.
