= Djerassi =

Djerassi may refer to:

- Boris Djerassi (born 1952), athlete and strongman
- Carl Djerassi (1923–2015), chemist
- Djerassi Artists Residency, artists' and writers' residency
- Djerassi Glacier, in Antarctica
