= Harvey Heights =

Harvey Heights may refer to several places:

- Harvey Heights (Tampa), a neighborhood within the City of Tampa, Florida, United States
- Harvey Heights (Antarctica), a place on the continent of Antarctica
