= Stavertsi Ridge =

Ridge in the Palmer Archipelago, Antarctica

Location of Brabant Island in the Antarctic Peninsula region.

Stavertsi Ridge (Bulgarian: Ставерски хребет, ‘Staverski Hrebet’ \'sta-ver-ski 'hre-bet\) is the mostly ice-covered ridge rising to 1169 m (Mount Cabeza) on Albena Peninsula, Brabant Island in the Palmer Archipelago, Antarctica. The feature extends 11 km in east-west direction and 4.7 km in north-south direction, and is connected to Stribog Mountains to the west by Viamata Saddle. It surmounts Paré Glacier to the northwest, and has its north and south slopes drained by Chumerna Glacier and Grigorov Glacier respectively.

The ridge is named after the settlement of Stavertsi in Northern Bulgaria.

== Location ==
Stavertsi Ridge is centred at 64°08′30″S 62°07′40″W. British mapping in 1980 and 2008.

== Maps ==
- Antarctic Digital Database (ADD). Scale 1:250000 topographic map of Antarctica. Scientific Committee on Antarctic Research (SCAR). Since 1993, regularly upgraded and updated.
- British Antarctic Territory. Scale 1:200000 topographic map. DOS 610 Series, Sheet W 64 62. Directorate of Overseas Surveys, Tolworth, UK, 1980.
- Brabant Island to Argentine Islands. Scale 1:250000 topographic map. British Antarctic Survey, 2008.
