= Davis Island (Palmer Archipelago) =

Island in Antarctica

- Location of Davis Island

- Location within Antarctic Peninsula Location within Antarctica

Geography
- Location: Antarctica
- Coordinates: 64°6′S 62°4′W
- Archipelago: Palmer Archipelago
- Length: 3.7 km (2.3 mi)

Administration
- Administered under the Antarctic Treaty System

Demographics
- Population: Uninhabited

Davis Island is an island about 3.7 km (2 nmi) long, situated in a position which blocks much of the channel between Brabant Island and Liège Island, in the Palmer Archipelago. It is separated from Liège Island on the north by Zlogosh Passage, and from Albena Peninsula, Brabant Island on the south by Sumer Passage.

The island was photographed and roughly charted by the Belgian Antarctic Expedition, 1897–99. The naming, by J.B. Charcot, leader of the French Antarctic Expedition, 1903–05, honors Walter G. Davis, director of the Argentine government meteorological office at the time of the French exploration.

== See also ==
- Composite Antarctic Gazetteer
- List of Antarctic islands south of 60° S
- Scientific Committee on Antarctic Research
- Territorial claims in Antarctica
