= Bov Point =

Geographical location in Antarctica

Location of Brabant Island in the Antarctic Peninsula region.

Bov Point (Bulgarian: нос Бов, ‘Nos Bov’ \'nos 'bov\) is the ice-covered point on the south side of the entrance to Kayak Bay on the east coast of Brabant Island in the Palmer Archipelago, Antarctica.

The point is named after the settlement of Bov in Western Bulgaria.

== Location ==
Bov Point is located at 64°17′07.3″S 62°09′14″W, which is 9.36 km southwest of Mitchell Point, 2.7 km west of Hvarchil Point on Lecointe Island, 3.35 km north-northeast of Momino Point, and 2.7 km east-southeast of Podem Peak whose offshoot forms the point. British mapping in 1980 and 2008.

== Maps ==
- Antarctic Digital Database (ADD). Scale 1:250000 topographic map of Antarctica. Scientific Committee on Antarctic Research (SCAR). Since 1993, regularly upgraded and updated.
- British Antarctic Territory. Scale 1:200000 topographic map. DOS 610 Series, Sheet W 64 62. Directorate of Overseas Surveys, Tolworth, UK, 1980.
- Brabant Island to Argentine Islands. Scale 1:250000 topographic map. British Antarctic Survey, 2008.
