= Lanusse Bay =

Bay in Antarctica

Location of Brabant Island in the Antarctic Peninsula region.

Lanusse Bay (64°14′S 62°30′W) lies between Driencourt Point and Minot Point on the west side of Brabant Island in the Palmer Archipelago, Antarctica. Its head is fed by Palilula, Gorichane and Djerassi Glaciers,

The bay was named "Bahia Lanusse" by the Argentine Antarctic Expedition in 1979, presumably after Teniente de Navio Alejandro Lanusse of the Argentine Navy, the first Argentine aircraft pilot to fly in the Antarctic; he was killed in a flying accident at Buenos Aires in about 1943.

== Maps ==
- Antarctic Digital Database (ADD). Scale 1:250000 topographic map of Antarctica. Scientific Committee on Antarctic Research (SCAR). Since 1993, regularly upgraded and updated.
- British Antarctic Territory. Scale 1:200000 topographic map. DOS 610 Series, Sheet W 64 62. Directorate of Overseas Surveys, Tolworth, UK, 1980.
- Brabant Island to Argentine Islands. Scale 1:250000 topographic map. British Antarctic Survey, 2008.
