= Sumer Passage =

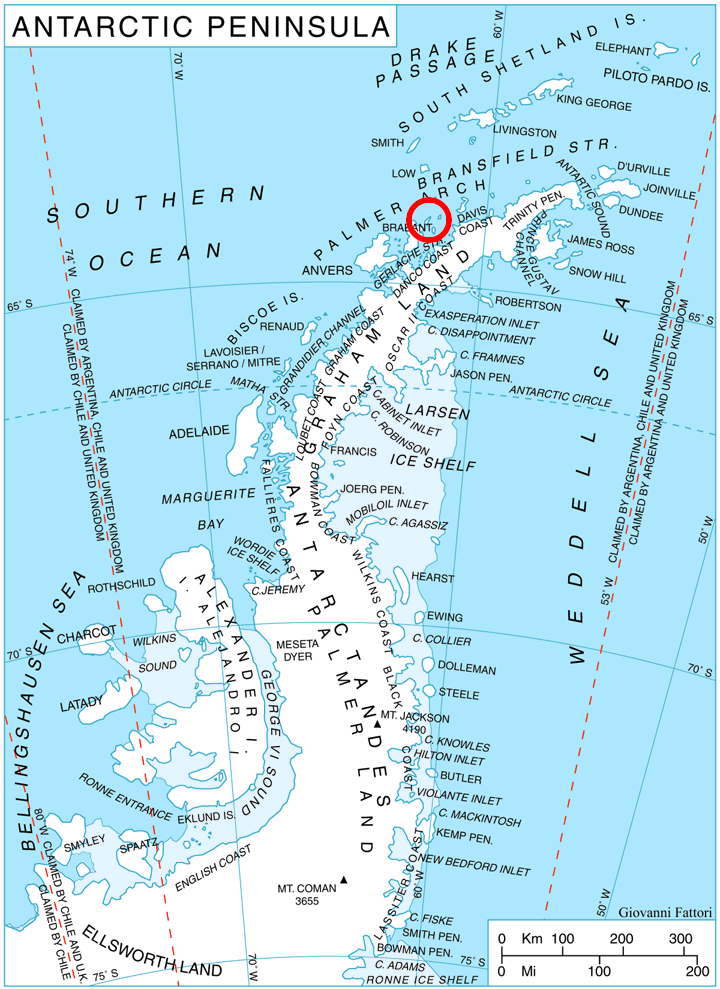
Location of Liège Island in the Antarctic Peninsula region.

Sumer Passage (Bulgarian: проток Сумер, ‘Protok Sumer’ \'pro-tok su-'mer\) is the 970 m wide passage in the Palmer Archipelago between Davis Island on the north and Albena Peninsula, Brabant Island on the south. It connects Bouquet Bay and Gerlache Strait, another connection between the two being Zlogosh Passage.

The passage is named after the settlement of Sumer in Northwestern Bulgaria.

== Location ==
Sumer Passage is located at 64°06′52″S 62°06′50″W. British mapping in 1978.

== Maps ==
- British Antarctic Territory. Scale 1:200000 topographic map. DOS 610 Series, Sheet W 64 62. Directorate of Overseas Surveys, UK, 1980.
- Antarctic Digital Database (ADD). Scale 1:250000 topographic map of Antarctica. Scientific Committee on Antarctic Research (SCAR). Since 1993, regularly upgraded and updated.
