= Momino Point =

Location of Brabant Island in the Antarctic Peninsula region.

Momino Point (Bulgarian: нос Момино, ‘Nos Momino’ \'nos 'mo-mi-no\) is the ice-covered point on the south side of the entrance to Kayak Bay on the east coast of Brabant Island in the Palmer Archipelago, Antarctica.

The point is named after the settlements of Momino in Northeastern and Southern Bulgaria.

== Location ==
Momino Point is located at 64°18′46″S 62°10′56″W, which is 3.35 km south-southwest of Bov Point, 5.15 km southwest of Lecointe Island, 2.15 km northwest of Pampa Island and 5.7 km north by east of Pinel Point. British mapping in 1980 and 2008.

== Maps ==
- Antarctic Digital Database (ADD). Scale 1:250000 topographic map of Antarctica. Scientific Committee on Antarctic Research (SCAR). Since 1993, regularly upgraded and updated.
- British Antarctic Territory. Scale 1:200000 topographic map. DOS 610 Series, Sheet W 64 62. Directorate of Overseas Surveys, Tolworth, UK, 1980.
- Brabant Island to Argentine Islands. Scale 1:250000 topographic map. British Antarctic Survey, 2008.
