= Peter Petroff =

- Born: 21 October 1919; Brestovitsa, Bulgaria
- Died: 27 February 2003 (aged 83); Huntsville, Alabama, United States

Peter Petroff (Bulgarian: Петър Петров; 21 October 1919 – 27 February 2003) was a Bulgarian American inventor, engineer, NASA scientist, and adventurer. He was involved in the NASA space program. Petroff assisted in the development of one of the earliest computerized pollution monitoring system and telemetry devices for early weather and communications satellites. He helped develop components of one of the world's first digital watches and an early wireless heart monitor. Petroff founded Care Electronics, Inc. which was acquired by Electro-Data, Inc. of Garland, Texas in autumn 1971.

Petroff Point on Brabant Island in Antarctica is named for Petroff.
