= Mitev Glacier =

Glacier in Antarctica

- Location of Bradant Island in the Antarctic Peninsula region

- Location within Antarctica
- Location: Palmer Archipelago
- Coordinates: 64°12′30″S 62°09′30″W
- Length: 1.5 nmi (3 km; 2 mi)
- Width: 1 nmi (2 km; 1 mi)
- Thickness: unknown
- Terminus: Hill Bay
- Status: unknown

Mitev Glacier (Bulgarian: Митев ледник, romanized: Mitev lednik, IPA: [ˈmitɛf ˈlɛdnik]) is the 2.9 km (1.8 mi) long and 2.5 km (1.6 mi) wide glacier on Brabant Island in the Palmer Archipelago, Antarctica situated east of Laennec Glacier. It drains the north slopes of Avroleva Heights and flows northeastwards to enter Hill Bay west of Petroff Point.

The glacier is named after the Bulgarian scientist Ivan Mitev (1924–2006) who discovered the sixth heart tone.

== Location ==
Mitev Glacier is centred at 64°12′30″S 62°09′30″W. British mapping in 1980.

== See also ==
- List of glaciers in the Antarctic
- Glaciology

== Maps ==
- Antarctic Digital Database (ADD). Scale 1:250000 topographic map of Antarctica. Scientific Committee on Antarctic Research (SCAR). Since 1993, regularly upgraded and updated.
- British Antarctic Territory. Scale 1:200000 topographic map. DOS 610 Series, Sheet W 64 62. Directorate of Overseas Surveys, Tolworth, UK, 1980.
- Brabant Island to Argentine Islands. Scale 1:250000 topographic map. British Antarctic Survey, 2008.
