= Albena Peninsula =

Peninsula in Antarctica

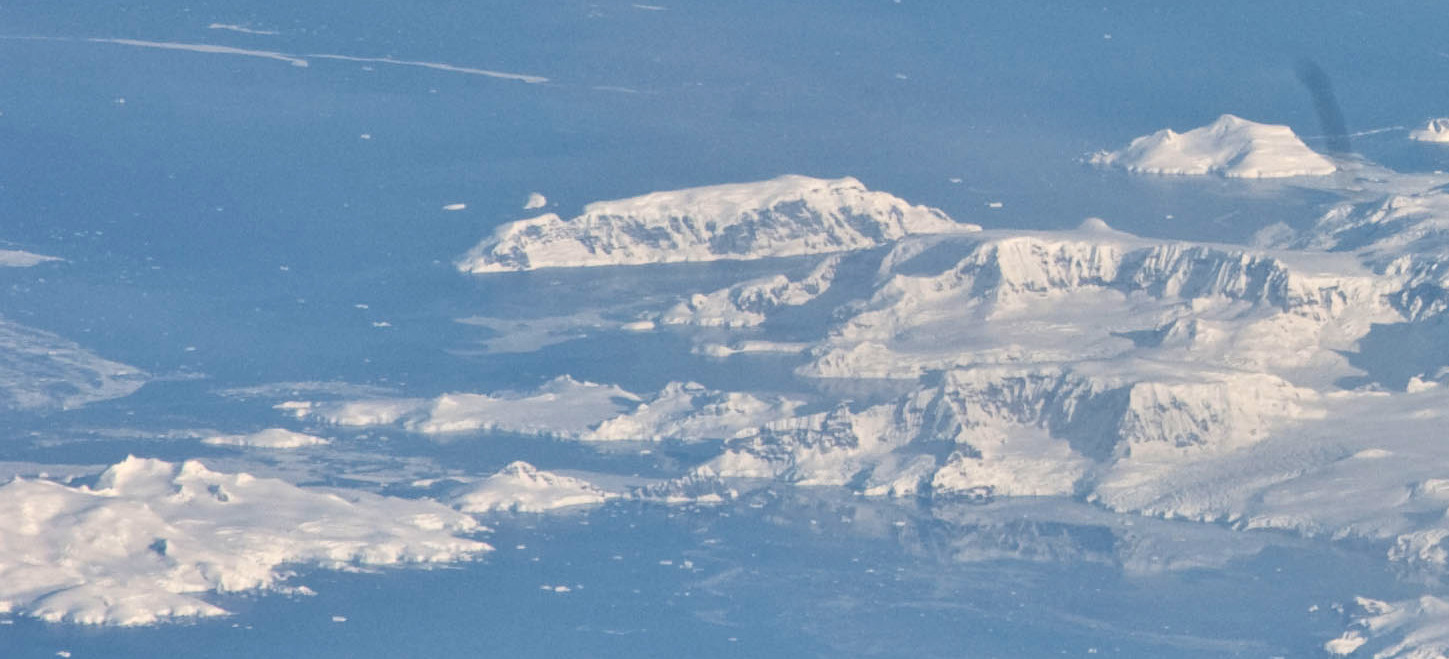
Liege Island, Davis Island and the Albena Peninsula of Brabant Island. Lecointe Island

Location of Brabant Island.

Albena Peninsula (Bulgarian: полуостров Албена, romanized: poluostrov Albena, IPA: [poɫuˈɔstrof ɐɫˈbɛnɐ]) is a peninsula extending 13 km in east–west direction and 9 km wide at its base, forming the east extremity of Brabant Island in the Palmer Archipelago, Antarctica. It is bounded by the terminus of Lister Glacier to the north and by Hill Bay to the south, ending in Spallanzani Point to the east, and has its interior occupied by Stavertsi Ridge. The peninsula is separated from Davis Island to the north by Sumer Passage.

Albena Peninsula is “named after the Bulgarian seaside resort of Albena, and in connection with the freezer vessel Albena of the Bulgarian company Ocean Fisheries – Burgas whose ships operated in the waters of South Georgia, Kerguelen, the South Orkney Islands, South Shetland Islands and Antarctic Peninsula from 1970 to the early 1990s. The Bulgarian fishermen, along with those of the Soviet Union, Poland and East Germany are the pioneers of modern Antarctic fishing industry.”

== Location ==
The peninsula is centred at 64°08′30″S 62°09′00″W. British mapping in 1980 and 2008.

== Maps ==
- Antarctic Digital Database (ADD). Scale 1:250000 topographic map of Antarctica. Scientific Committee on Antarctic Research (SCAR). Since 1993, regularly upgraded and updated.
- British Antarctic Territory. Scale 1:200000 topographic map. DOS 610 Series, Sheet W 64 62. Directorate of Overseas Surveys, Tolworth, UK, 1980.
- Brabant Island to Argentine Islands. Scale 1:250000 topographic map. British Antarctic Survey, 2008.
