= Kotlari =

Kotlari Котлари
- Village
- Location within Bulgaria
- Coordinates: 41.6167°N 25.7500°E
- Country: Bulgaria
- Province: Kardzhali Province
- Municipality: Krumovgrad
- Elevation: 228 m (748 ft)

Population (2021)
  - Total: 100
- Time zone: UTC+2 (EET)
  - Summer (DST): UTC+3 (EEST)

Kotlari is a village in Krumovgrad Municipality, Kardzhali Province, southern Bulgaria.

== Honours ==
Kotlari Peak on Brabant Island, Antarctica is named after the village.
