= Albena =

Albena Албена
- Resort
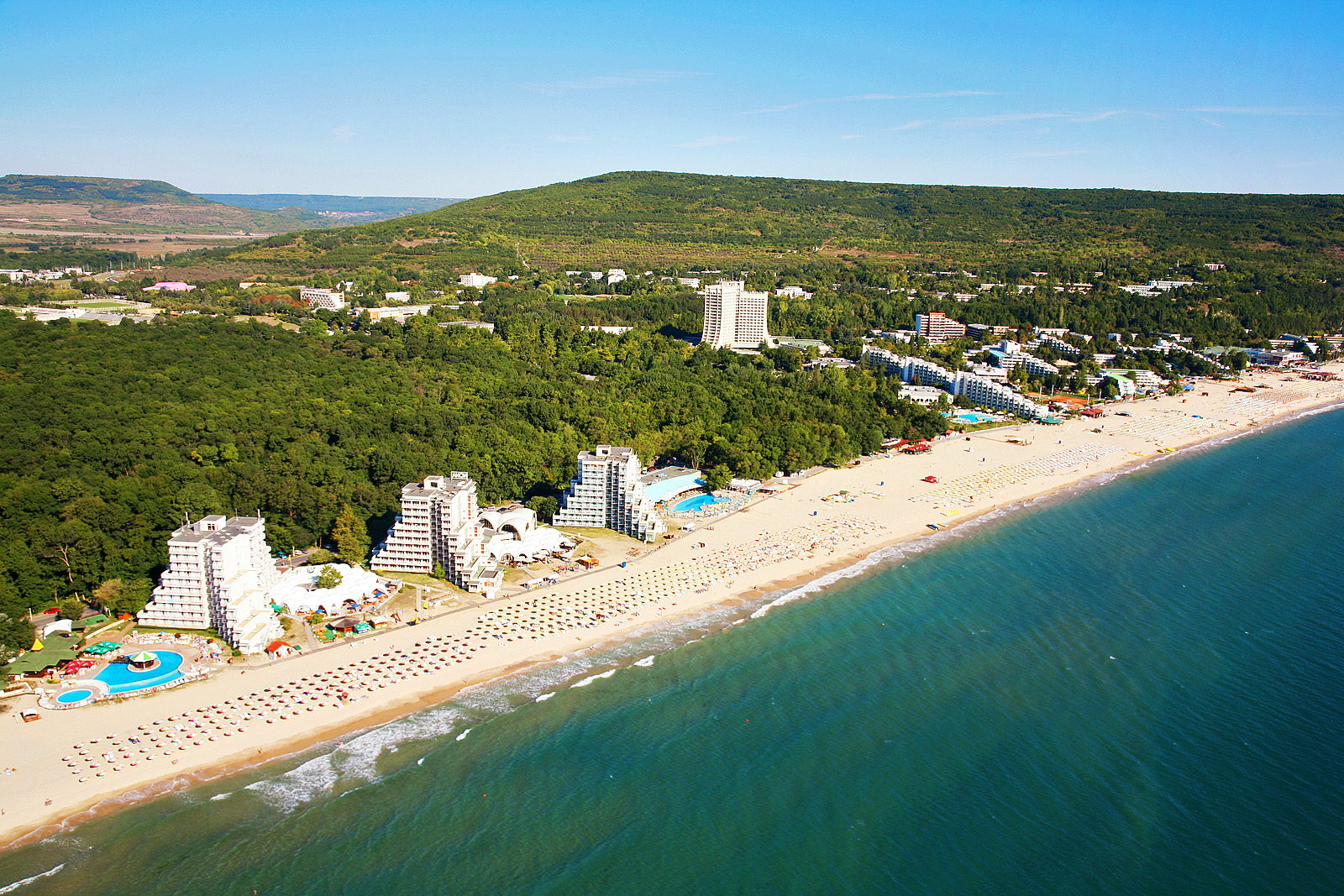
- Aerial view of the Albena coastline

- Location within Bulgaria
- Coordinates: 43°22′09″N 28°04′52″E
- Country: Bulgaria
- Province: Dobrich
- Municipality: Balchik

Government
  - Mayor: Nikolay Angelov (Independent)
- Time zone: UTC+2 (EET)
  - Summer (DST): UTC+3 (EEST)
- Postal code: 9620
- Area code: +359 579

Albena (Bulgarian: Албена) is a major Black Sea resort in northeastern Bulgaria, Balchik Municipality, situated 12 km (7 mi) from Balchik and 30 km (19 mi) from Varna. Albena is served by Varna Airport. Since 2005 is considered as a settlement by the National Statistical Institute.

Albena is one of the purpose-built resorts on the Bulgarian Black Sea coast and has a uniform and unique architectural style. Although it was built on an empty ground in the 1960s, now this is in fact a small resort town with its own downtown, streets, squares and even internal public transport — dedicated little "trains" circulate on schedule along their routes within the resort. The resort was opened in 1967 by the top Bulgarian communist officials of the People's Republic of Bulgaria Georgi Traykov, Todor Zhivkov and several others.

The resort is 5-km long, 150 m wide beach with fine sand. Sea depth does not exceed 1.6 metres at a distance up to 100–150 metres from the beach. The tourist season lasts from May till October.

On decision of the Тolbukhin regional council (today in Dobrich), the resort was named after a female character from a tale by Bulgarian writer Yordan Yovkov. Albena is a Bulgarian female given name.

Albena Peninsula on the Brabant Island in Antarctica is named after Albena.

Albena hosts international exhibition women's football tournament Albena Cup since late 1980s.

== Gallery ==
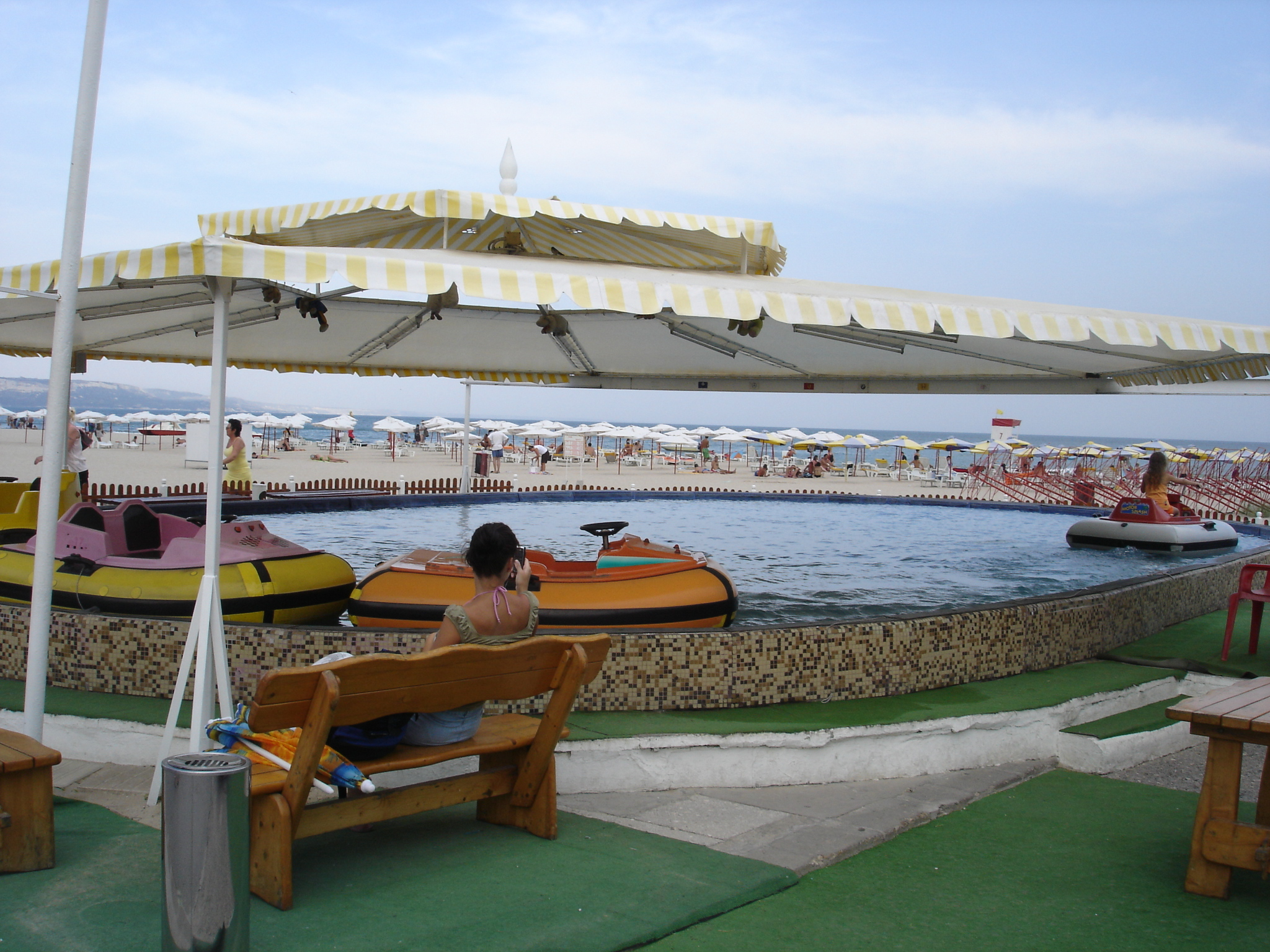
Beach

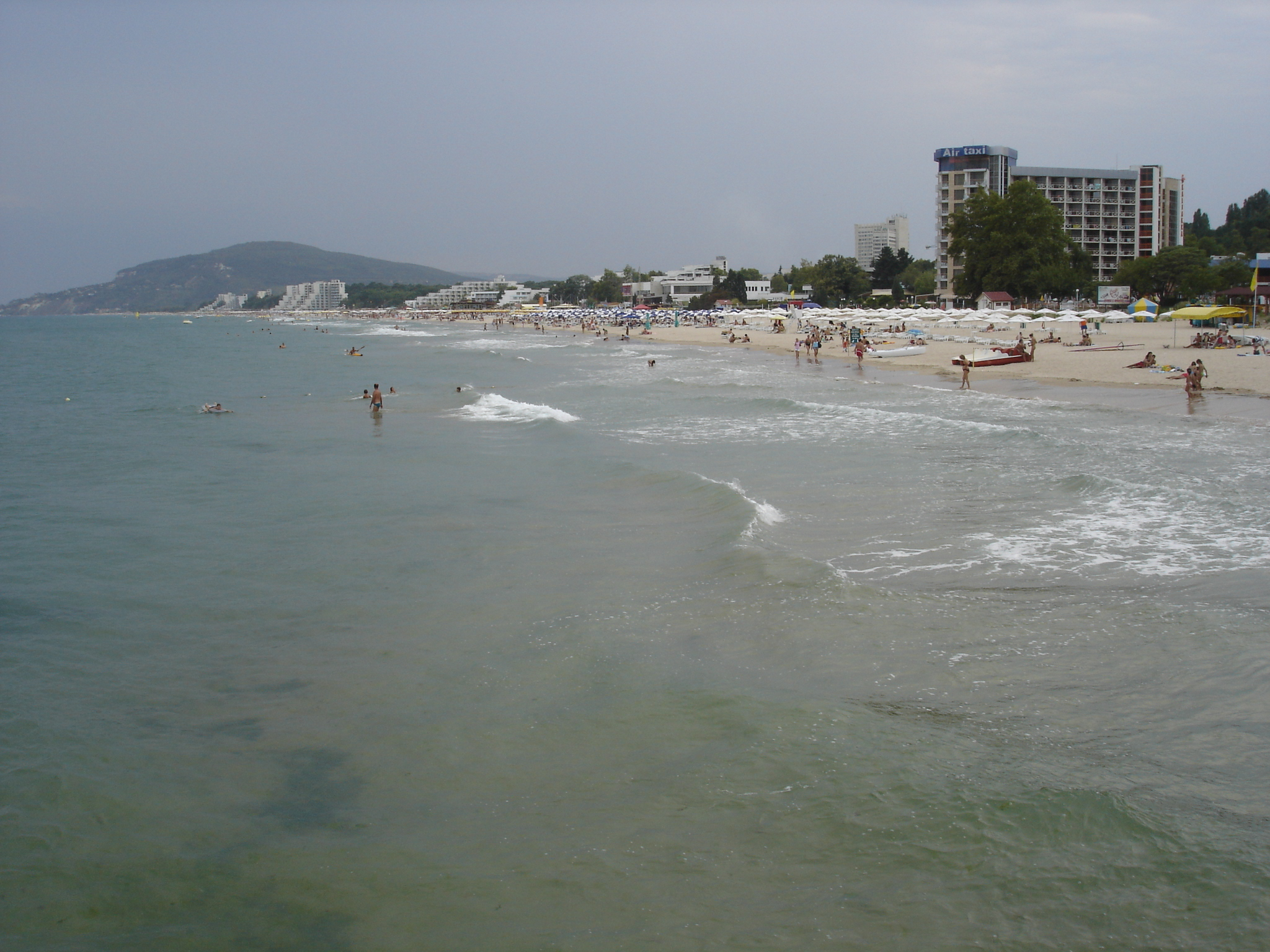
View

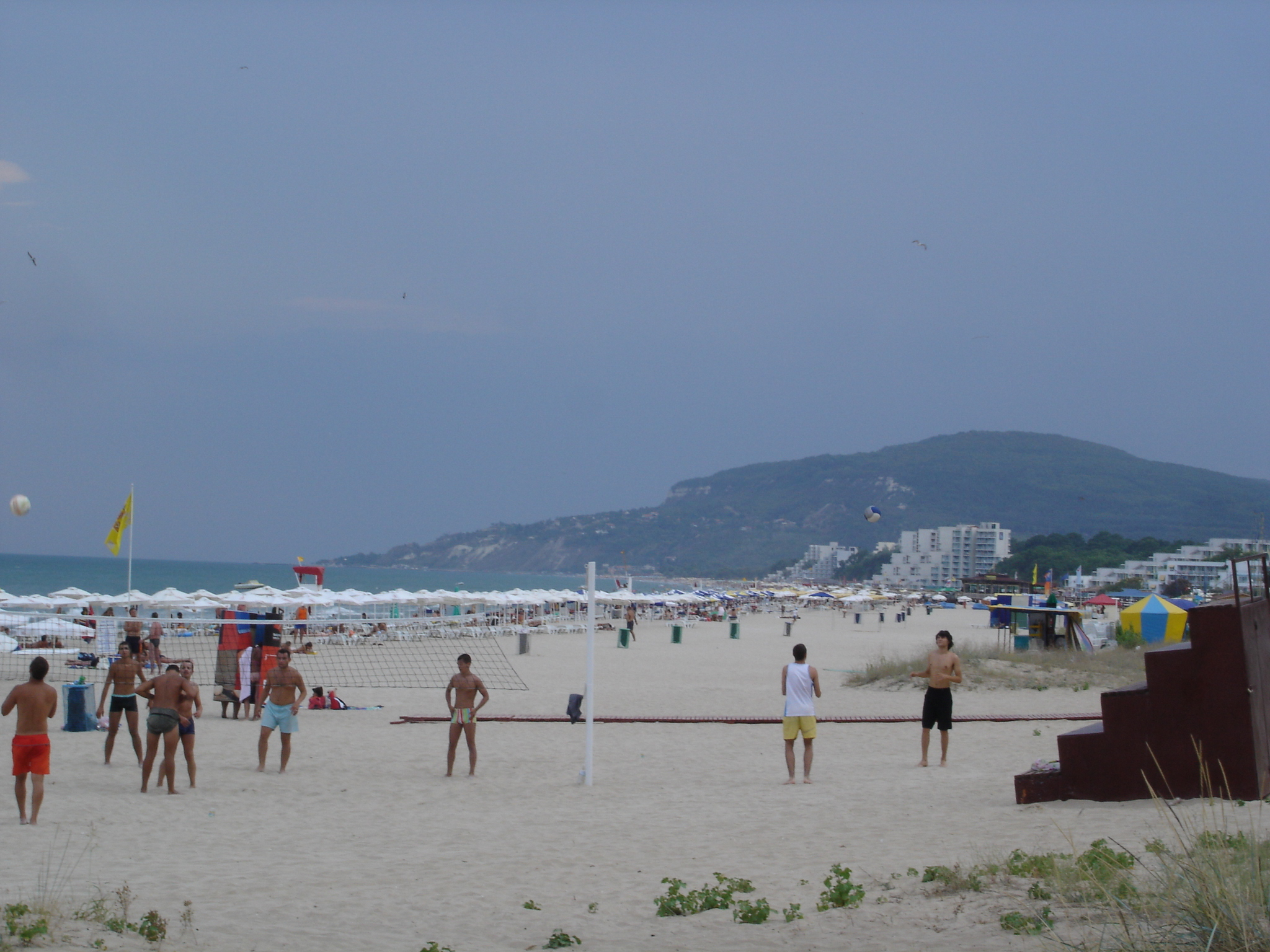
Beach

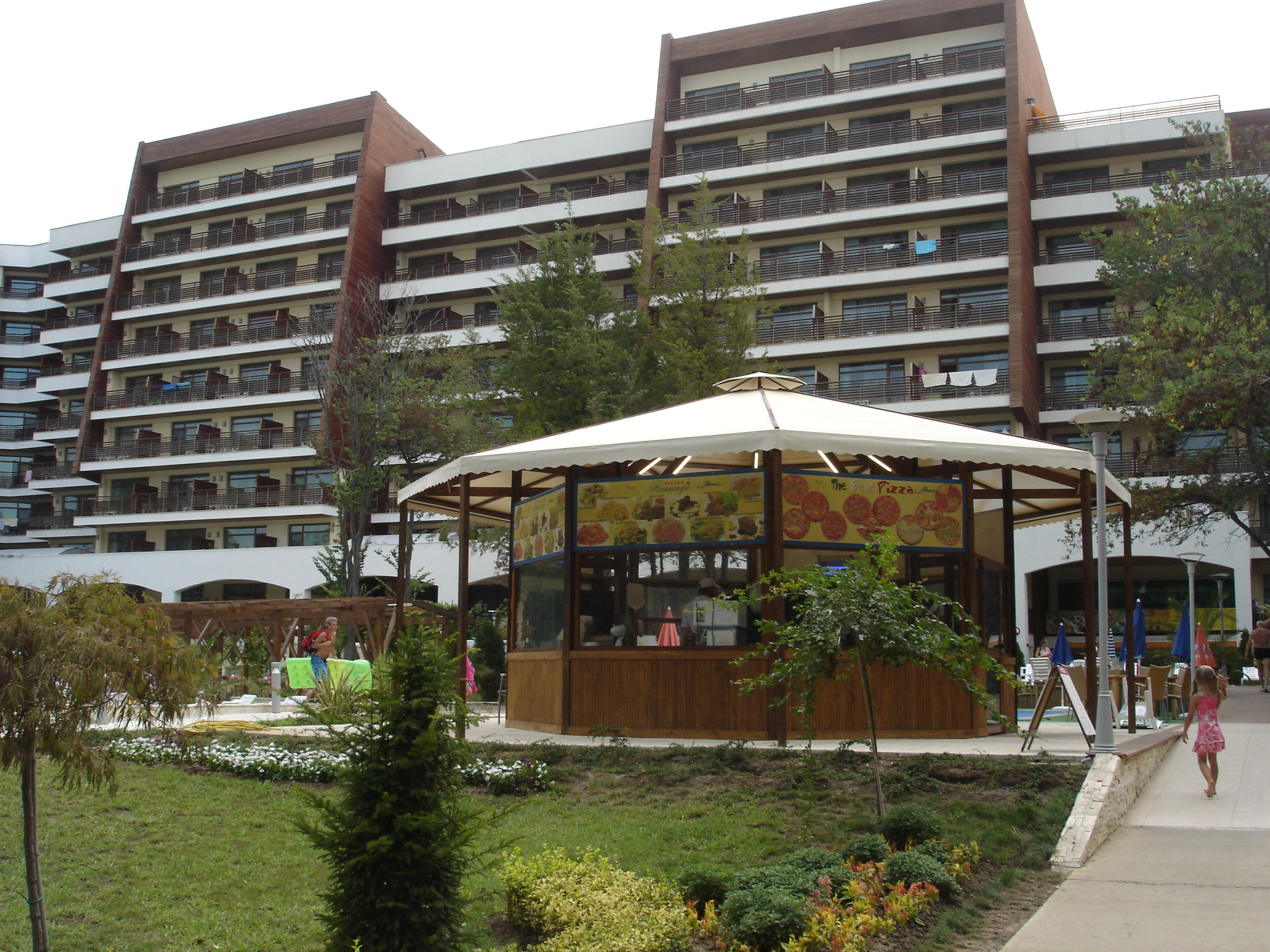
Hotel Flamingo

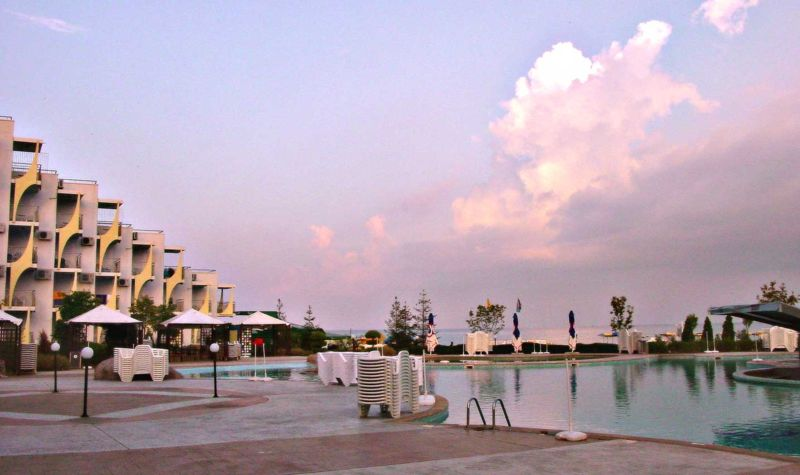
Albena at twilight
