= Balanstra Glacier =

Glacier in Palmer Archipelago, Antarctica

- Location of Brabant Island in the Antarctic Peninsula

- Location within Antarctica
- Location: Palmer Archipelago
- Coordinates: 64°19′30″S 62°18′20″W
- Length: 6 nmi (11 km; 7 mi)
- Width: 2 nmi (4 km; 2 mi)
- Thickness: unknown
- Terminus: Pampa Passage
- Status: unknown

Balanstra Glacier (Bulgarian: ледник Баланстра, romanized: lednik Balanstra, IPA: [ˈlɛdniɡ bɐˈɫanstrɐ]) is the 12 km long and 4 km wide glacier on Brabant Island in the Palmer Archipelago, Antarctica situated northeast of Hippocrates Glacier and southwest of Mackenzie Glacier. It drains the southeast slopes of Stribog Mountains, flows east-southeastwards and enters Pampa Passage south of Momino Point and north of Pinel Point.

The glacier is named after the ancient Roman station of Balanstra in Western Bulgaria.

== Location ==
Balanstra Glacier is centred at 64°19′30″S 62°18′20″W. British mapping in 1980 and 2008.

== Maps ==
- Antarctic Digital Database (ADD). Scale 1:250000 topographic map of Antarctica. Scientific Committee on Antarctic Research (SCAR). Since 1993, regularly upgraded and updated.
- British Antarctic Territory. Scale 1:200000 topographic map. DOS 610 Series, Sheet W 64 62. Directorate of Overseas Surveys, Tolworth, UK, 1980.
- Brabant Island to Argentine Islands. Scale 1:250000 topographic map. British Antarctic Survey, 2008.
