= Mitchell Point =

Mitchell Point may refer to:

- Mitchell Point (Antarctica), a point at the south side of the entrance to Hill Bay on the east coast of Brabant Island, in the Palmer Archipelago
- Mitchell Point (Oregon), a point on the Columbia River Gorge in the U.S. state of Oregon
