= Pampa Island =

Island in Palmer Archipelago, Antarctica

- Location of Pampa Island

- Location within Antarctic Peninsula Location within Antarctica

Geography
- Location: Antarctica
- Coordinates: 64°20′S 62°10′W
- Archipelago: Palmer Archipelago

Administration
- Administered under the Antarctic Treaty System

Demographics
- Population: Uninhabited

Pampa Island, also known as Hunt Island, is an island 1.5 nautical miles (2.8 km) long and 475 m (1,558 ft) high, which lies off the east coast of Brabant Island in the Palmer Archipelago. The island lies 1 nautical mile (1.9 km) northeast of Pinel Point and is separated from Brabant Island by the southern part of Pampa Passage. First roughly charted by the Belgian Antarctic Expedition, 1897–99. Named by the Argentine expedition of 1947–48 in association with Pampa Passage.

== Maps ==
- Antarctic Digital Database (ADD). Scale 1:250000 topographic map of Antarctica. Scientific Committee on Antarctic Research (SCAR). Since 1993, regularly upgraded and updated.
- British Antarctic Territory. Scale 1:200000 topographic map. DOS 610 Series, Sheet W 64 62. Directorate of Overseas Surveys, Tolworth, UK, 1980.
- Brabant Island to Argentine Islands. Scale 1:250000 topographic map. British Antarctic Survey, 2008.

== See also ==
- List of Antarctic and sub-Antarctic islands
