= Zlogosh Passage =

Passage in Antarctica

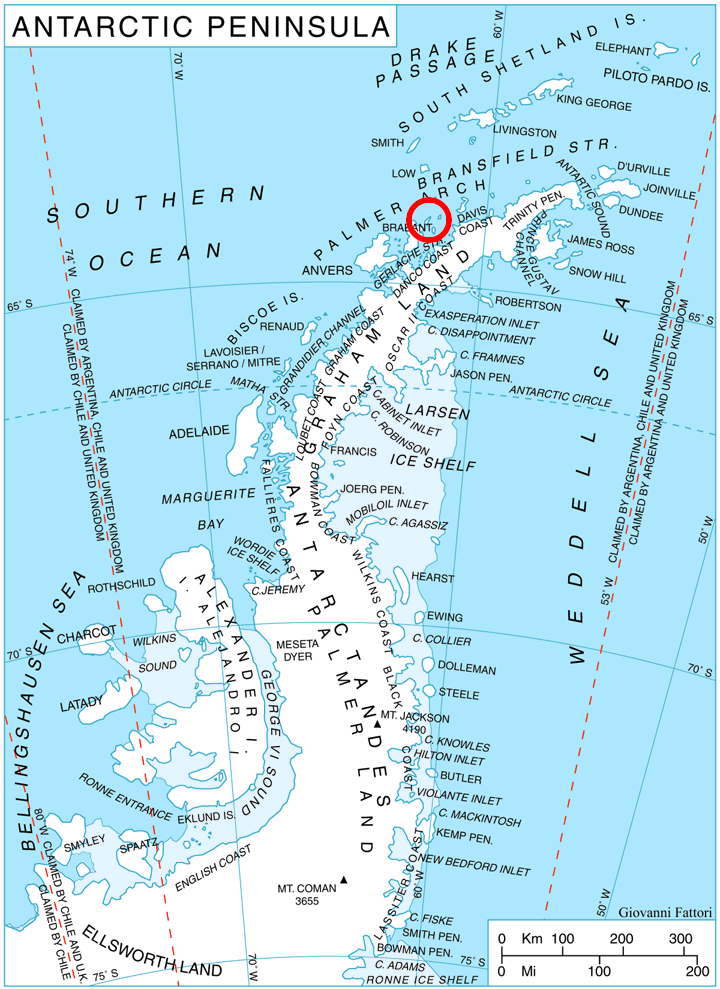
Location of Liège Island in the Antarctic Peninsula region.

Zlogosh Passage (Bulgarian: проток Злогош, ‘Protok Zlogosh’ \'pro-tok 'zlo-gosh\) is the 320 m wide passage in the Palmer Archipelago between Davis Island on the south and Chauveau Point, Liège Island on the north. It connects Bouquet Bay and Gerlache Strait, another connection between the two being Sumer Passage.

The passage is named after the settlement of Zlogosh in Western Bulgaria.

== Location ==
Zlogosh Passage is located at 64°05′12″S 62°03′20″W. British mapping in 1978.

== Maps ==
- British Antarctic Territory. Scale 1:200000 topographic map. DOS 610 Series, Sheet W 64 62. Directorate of Overseas Surveys, UK, 1980.
- Antarctic Digital Database (ADD). Scale 1:250000 topographic map of Antarctica. Scientific Committee on Antarctic Research (SCAR). Since 1993, regularly upgraded and updated.
