= Virchow Hill =

Mountain in Antarctica

Virchow Hill (64°7′S 62°17′W) is a hill between Lister Glacier and Pare Glacier in the north part of Brabant Island, in the Palmer Archipelago. Shown on an Argentine government chart in 1953, but not named. Photographed by Hunting Aerosurveys Ltd. in 1956-57 part of Falkland Islands and Dependencies Aerial Survey Expedition, and mapped from these photos in 1959. Named by the United Kingdom Antarctic Place-Names Committee (UK-APC) for Rudolf Virchow (1821–1902), German pioneer of pathological research.

== Maps ==
- Antarctic Digital Database (ADD). Scale 1:250000 topographic map of Antarctica. Scientific Committee on Antarctic Research (SCAR). Since 1993, regularly upgraded and updated.
- British Antarctic Territory. Scale 1:200000 topographic map. DOS 610 Series, Sheet W 64 62. Directorate of Overseas Surveys, Tolworth, UK, 1980.
- Brabant Island to Argentine Islands. Scale 1:250000 topographic map. British Antarctic Survey, 2008.
