= Chauveau Point =

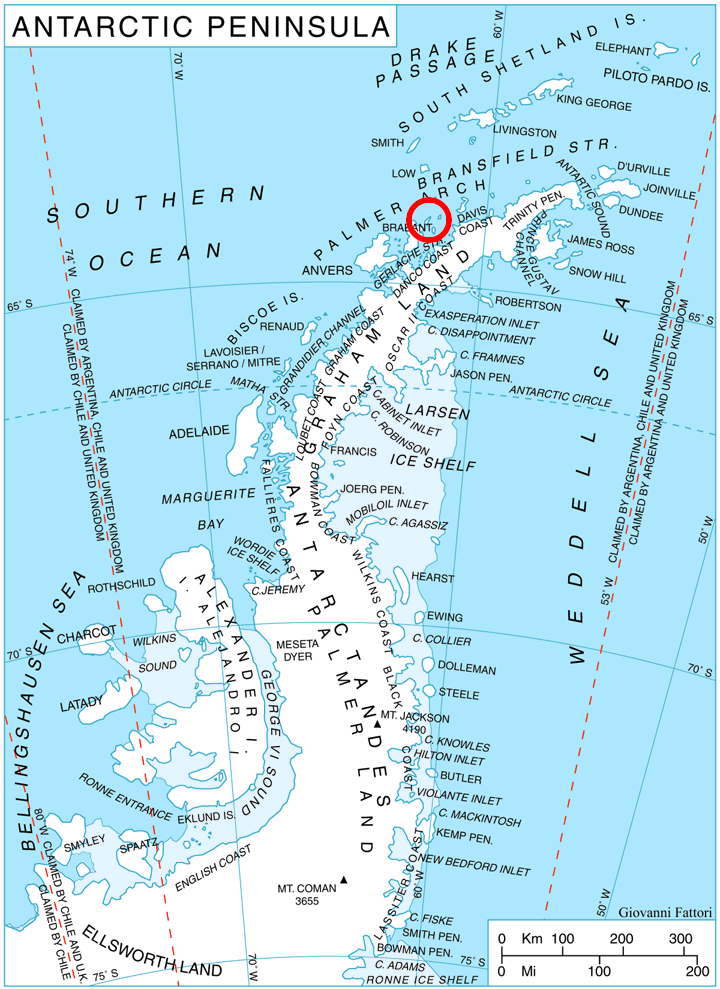
Location of Liège Island in the Antarctic Peninsula region.

Chauveau Point (64°5′S 62°2′W) is a headland on the north side of Zlogosh Passage marking the southwestern end of Liège Island, in the Palmer Archipelago.

The western point of Liège Island was first charted by the French Antarctic Expedition, 1903–05, and named by Jean-Baptiste Charcot for Monsieur Chauveau, an associate of the Central Meteorological Office at Paris. Since there is no prominent point on the central part of the west coast which can be reidentified without ambiguity, the name has been applied to the conspicuous southwest point which was also seen by Charcot.

The point was photographed from the air by FIDASE in 1956–57.
