= Hales Peak =

Mountain in Antarctica

Hales Peak (64°8′S 62°9′W) is a peak rising from the northeast shoulder of Mount Cabeza in the northeast part of Brabant Island, Palmer Archipelago, Antarctica. It was mapped from air photos taken by Hunting Aerosurveys Ltd, 1956–57, and was named by the UK Antarctic Place-Names Committee for the Englishman Stephen Hales, curate of Teddington, who first estimated blood pressure, and made important advances in hygiene.

== Maps ==
- Antarctic Digital Database (ADD). Scale 1:250000 topographic map of Antarctica. Scientific Committee on Antarctic Research (SCAR). Since 1993, regularly upgraded and updated.
- British Antarctic Territory. Scale 1:200000 topographic map. DOS 610 Series, Sheet W 64 62. Directorate of Overseas Surveys, Tolworth, UK, 1980.
- Brabant Island to Argentine Islands. Scale 1:250000 topographic map. British Antarctic Survey, 2008.
