= Avroleva Heights =

Location of Brabant Island in the Antarctic Peninsula region.

Avroleva Heights (Bulgarian: Възвишения Авролева, romanized: Vazvisheniya Avroleva) are the mostly ice-covered heights rising to 1137 m (Opizo Peak) on the east coast of Brabant Island in the Palmer Archipelago, Antarctica. They extend 7.3 km in north-south direction from Hill Bay to Svetovrachene Glacier, and 7.3 km in east-west direction from Mitchell Point to Doriones Saddle, which saddle connects the heights to Taran Plateau in Stribog Mountains. The heights have steep and partly ice-free north and east slopes.

Avroleva is the medieval name of a mountain in Southeastern Bulgaria.

== Location ==
Avroleva Heights are centred at 64°13′10″S 62°08′50″W. British mapping in 1980 and 2008.

== Maps ==
- Antarctic Digital Database (ADD). Scale 1:250000 topographic map of Antarctica. Scientific Committee on Antarctic Research (SCAR). Since 1993, regularly upgraded and updated.
- British Antarctic Territory. Scale 1:200000 topographic map. DOS 610 Series, Sheet W 64 62. Directorate of Overseas Surveys, Tolworth, UK, 1980.
- Brabant Island to Argentine Islands. Scale 1:250000 topographic map. British Antarctic Survey, 2008.
