= Kostur, Bulgaria =

Kostur
- Village
- Location within Bulgaria
- Coordinates: 41°58′N 26°17′E
- Country: Bulgaria
- Province: Haskovo Province
- Municipality: Svilengrad
- Time zone: UTC+2 (EET)
  - Summer (DST): UTC+3 (EEST)

Kostur, Bulgaria is a village in the municipality of Svilengrad, in Haskovo Province, in southern Bulgaria.

Kostur Point on Brabant Island in Palmer Archipelago, Antarctica is named after the village.
