= Zelenika, Gabrovo Province =

Zelenika
- Village
- Location within Bulgaria
- Coordinates: 42°52′N 25°30′E
- Country: Bulgaria
- Province: Gabrovo Province
- Municipality: Tryavna

Population (2013)
  - Total: 5
- Time zone: UTC+2 (EET)
  - Summer (DST): UTC+3 (EEST)

Zelenika is a village in Tryavna Municipality, in Gabrovo Province, in northern central Bulgaria.

== Honours ==
Zelenika Peak on Brabant Island, Antarctica is named after the village.
