= Gutsal Ridge =

Ridge on Brabant Island, Antarctica

Location of Brabant Island in the Antarctic Peninsula region.

Gutsal Ridge (Bulgarian: Гуцалски хребет, ‘Gutsalski Hrebet’ \'gu-tsal-ski 'hre-bet\) is the ice-covered ridge extending 10.4 km in northwest-southeast direction and rising to 1574 m (Trambesh Peak) on the southeast side of Stribog Mountains on Brabant Island in the Palmer Archipelago, Antarctica. The southeast half of the ridge has steep and partly ice-free southwest slopes. It surmounts Hippocrates Glacier to the southwest and Balanstra Glacier to the northeast.

The ridge is named after the settlement of Gutsal in Western Bulgaria.

== Location ==
Gutsal Ridge is centred at 64°20′25″S 62°20′40″W. British mapping in 1980 and 2008.

== Maps ==
- Antarctic Digital Database (ADD). Scale 1:250000 topographic map of Antarctica. Scientific Committee on Antarctic Research (SCAR). Since 1993, regularly upgraded and updated.
- British Antarctic Territory. Scale 1:200000 topographic map. DOS 610 Series, Sheet W 64 62. Directorate of Overseas Surveys, Tolworth, UK, 1980.
- Brabant Island to Argentine Islands. Scale 1:250000 topographic map. British Antarctic Survey, 2008.
