= Cape Kaiser =

Cape Kaiser (64°14′S 62°1′W) is the north end of Lecointe Island, lying just east of Brabant Island in the Palmer Archipelago, Antarctica. It was discovered by the Belgian Antarctic Expedition, 1897–1899, under Gerlache, and named by him for a supporter of the expedition.
