= Buls Bay =

Bay in Antarctica

Buls Bay (64°23′S 62°19′W) is a bay 2 nautical miles (4 km) wide, which indents the east side of Brabant Island just north of D'Ursel Point, in the Palmer Archipelago. It was discovered by the Belgian Antarctic Expedition under Gerlache, 1897–99, and named by him for Charles Buls, a supporter of the expedition.
