= Spallanzani Point =

Spallanzani Point (64°8′S 61°59′W) is a point forming the north side of the entrance to Hill Bay and the east tip of Albena Peninsula and Brabant Island, in the Palmer Archipelago. Probably first seen by the Belgian Antarctic Expedition, 1897–99, under Gerlache. Mapped in 1959 from photos taken by Hunting Aerosurveys Ltd. in 1956–57. Named by the United Kingdom Antarctic Place-Names Committee (UK-APC) for Lazzaro Spallanzani (1729–1799), Italian physiologist who first interpreted the process of digestion in 1780.

== Maps ==
- Antarctic Digital Database (ADD). Scale 1:250000 topographic map of Antarctica. Scientific Committee on Antarctic Research (SCAR). Since 1993, regularly upgraded and updated.
- British Antarctic Territory. Scale 1:200000 topographic map. DOS 610 Series, Sheet W 64 62. Directorate of Overseas Surveys, Tolworth, UK, 1980.
- Brabant Island to Argentine Islands. Scale 1:250000 topographic map. British Antarctic Survey, 2008.
