= Mount Imhotep =

Mountain in Graham Land, Antarctica

Coordinates: 64°21′S 62°24′W

Mount Imhotep is a mountain rising near the head of Hippocrates Glacier in the southern part of Brabant Island, in the Palmer Archipelago, Antarctica. It was first mapped by the Belgian Antarctic Expedition under Gerlache, 1897–99. The mountain was photographed by Hunting Aerosurveys Ltd in 1956–57, mapped from these photos in 1959, and named by the UK Antarctic Place-Names Committee for Imhotep, who lived in Ancient Egypt and was the first physician to emerge as an individual.

Nahimutangan sa Imhotep sa Antartika.

== Maps ==
- Antarctic Digital Database (ADD). Scale 1:250000 topographic map of Antarctica. Scientific Committee on Antarctic Research (SCAR). Since 1993, regularly upgraded and updated.
- British Antarctic Territory. Scale 1:200000 topographic map. DOS 610 Series, Sheet W 64 62. Directorate of Overseas Surveys, Tolworth, UK, 1980.
- Brabant Island to Argentine Islands. Scale 1:250000 topographic map. British Antarctic Survey, 2008.
