= Malpighi Glacier =

Glacier in Antarctica

- Location of Bradant Island in the Antarctic Peninsula region

- Location within Antarctica
- Location: Palmer Archipelago
- Coordinates: 64°16′S 62°15′W
- Length: 5 nmi (9 km; 6 mi)
- Width: 1 nmi (2 km; 1 mi)
- Thickness: unknown
- Terminus: Kayak Bay
- Status: unknown

Malpighi Glacier (64°16′S 62°15′W) is a glacier 5 nautical miles (9 km) long and 1 nautical mile (2 km) wide, draining southeast from the Harvey Heights in Stribog Mountains along Basarbovo Ridge to join Mackenzie Glacier and flow into Kayak Bay at the east coast of Brabant Island, in the Palmer Archipelago, Antarctica. It was first roughly charted by the Belgian Antarctic Expedition, 1897–99, under Gerlache. The glacier was photographed by Hunting Aerosurveys Ltd in 1956–57, and mapped from these photos in 1959. It was named by the UK Antarctic Place-Names Committee for Marcello Malpighi, an Italian physiologist and pioneer histologist who first demonstrated the existence of the blood capillaries.

== See also ==
- List of glaciers in the Antarctic
- Glaciology

== Maps ==
- Antarctic Digital Database (ADD). Scale 1:250000 topographic map of Antarctica. Scientific Committee on Antarctic Research (SCAR). Since 1993, regularly upgraded and updated.
- British Antarctic Territory. Scale 1:200000 topographic map. DOS 610 Series, Sheet W 64 62. Directorate of Overseas Surveys, Tolworth, UK, 1980.
- Brabant Island to Argentine Islands. Scale 1:250000 topographic map. British Antarctic Survey, 2008.
