= Mount Cabeza =

Mountain on Brabant Island, Antarctica

Location of Brabant Island in the Antarctic Peninsula region.

Mount Cabeza (64°8′S 62°11′W) is a mountain in Stavertsi Ridge on the southeast side of Pare Glacier, 1 nautical mile (2 km) southwest of Hales Peak, in the northeast portion of Brabant Island, Palmer Archipelago in Antarctica. The name "Monte Cabeza" was used on a 1957 Argentine hydrographic chart.

== Maps ==
- Antarctic Digital Database (ADD). Scale 1:250000 topographic map of Antarctica. Scientific Committee on Antarctic Research (SCAR). Since 1993, regularly upgraded and updated.
- British Antarctic Territory. Scale 1:200000 topographic map. DOS 610 Series, Sheet W 64 62. Directorate of Overseas Surveys, Tolworth, UK, 1980.
- Brabant Island to Argentine Islands. Scale 1:250000 topographic map. British Antarctic Survey, 2008.
