= Driencourt Point =

Headland in Antarctica

Driencourt Point (64°12′S 62°31′W) is a point 6 nautical miles (11 km) southeast of Claude Point on the west side of Brabant Island, in the Palmer Archipelago. It was first charted by the French Antarctic Expedition, 1903–05, and named by Jean-Baptiste Charcot after Joseph F.L. Driencourt, a French engineer who advised on the hydrographic equipment for the expedition.

== Maps ==
- Antarctic Digital Database (ADD). Scale 1:250000 topographic map of Antarctica. Scientific Committee on Antarctic Research (SCAR). Since 1993, regularly upgraded and updated.
- British Antarctic Territory. Scale 1:200000 topographic map. DOS 610 Series, Sheet W 64 62. Directorate of Overseas Surveys, Tolworth, UK, 1980.
- Brabant Island to Argentine Islands. Scale 1:250000 topographic map. British Antarctic Survey, 2008.
