= Minot Point =

Headland

Coordinates: 64°16′S 62°31′W

Minot Point is a rock point midway along the west coast of Brabant Island, in the Palmer Archipelago, Antarctica. It lies 3 nautical miles (6 km) west of the summit of Mount Parry. The point was mapped from air photos taken by Hunting Aerosurveys Ltd in 1956–57, and was named by the UK Antarctic Place-Names Committee after American physician George R. Minot, co-winner of a Nobel Prize for his work on liver therapy in pernicious anemia.

== Maps ==
- Antarctic Digital Database (ADD). Scale 1:250000 topographic map of Antarctica. Scientific Committee on Antarctic Research (SCAR). Since 1993, regularly upgraded and updated.
- British Antarctic Territory. Scale 1:200000 topographic map. DOS 610 Series, Sheet W 64 62. Directorate of Overseas Surveys, Tolworth, UK, 1980.
- Brabant Island to Argentine Islands. Scale 1:250000 topographic map. British Antarctic Survey, 2008.
