= Pampa Passage =

Pampa Passage (64°18′S 62°10′W) is a ship passage along the east side of Brabant Island, trending southwestward between the latter island and off-lying Lecointe Island and Pampa Island. The name "Bahia Pampa" was given by the Argentine Antarctic expedition of 1947-48 after the term passage is considered apt for this feature.

== Gallery ==
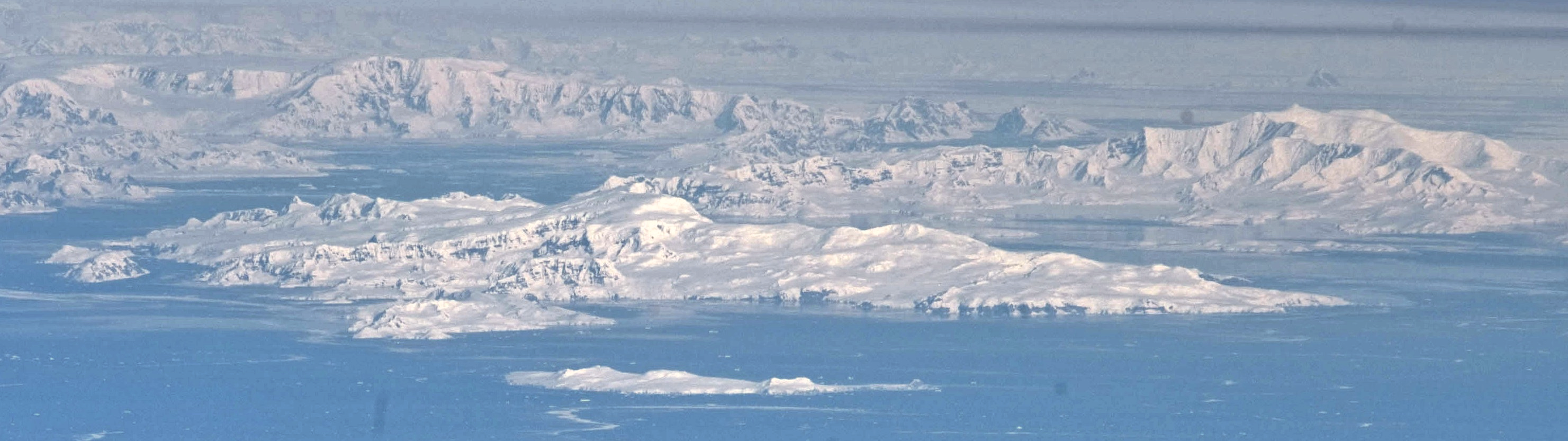
Brabant Island seen from northeast, with the smaller Hoseason Island and Liège Islands in the foreground, and Anvers Island (on the right) and the Antarctic Peninsula in the background. Lecointe Island lies to the left of Brabant Island, separated by a narrow channel (the Pampa Passage) of water.

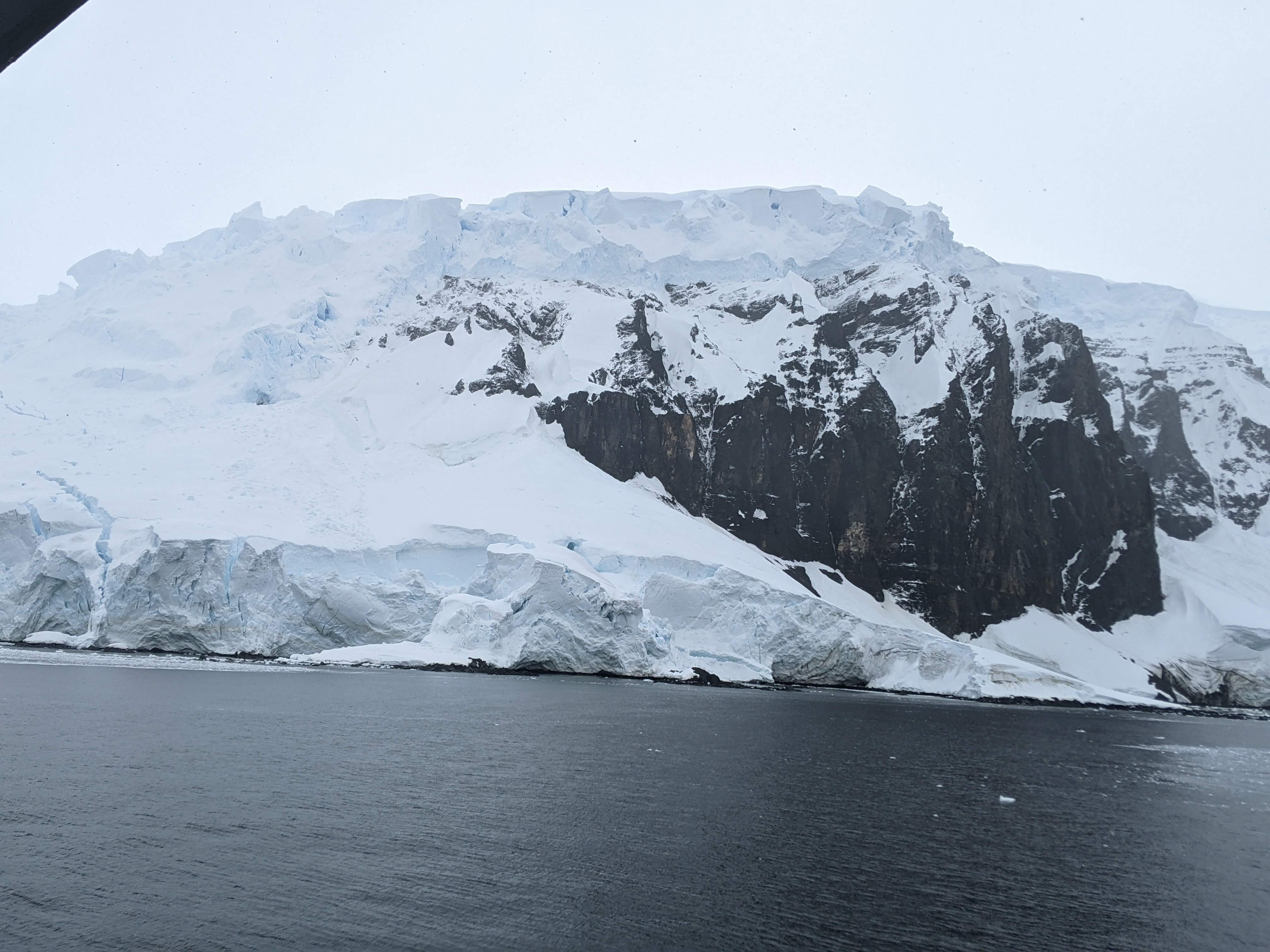
Lecointe Island from the Pampa Passage between that island and Brabant Island.

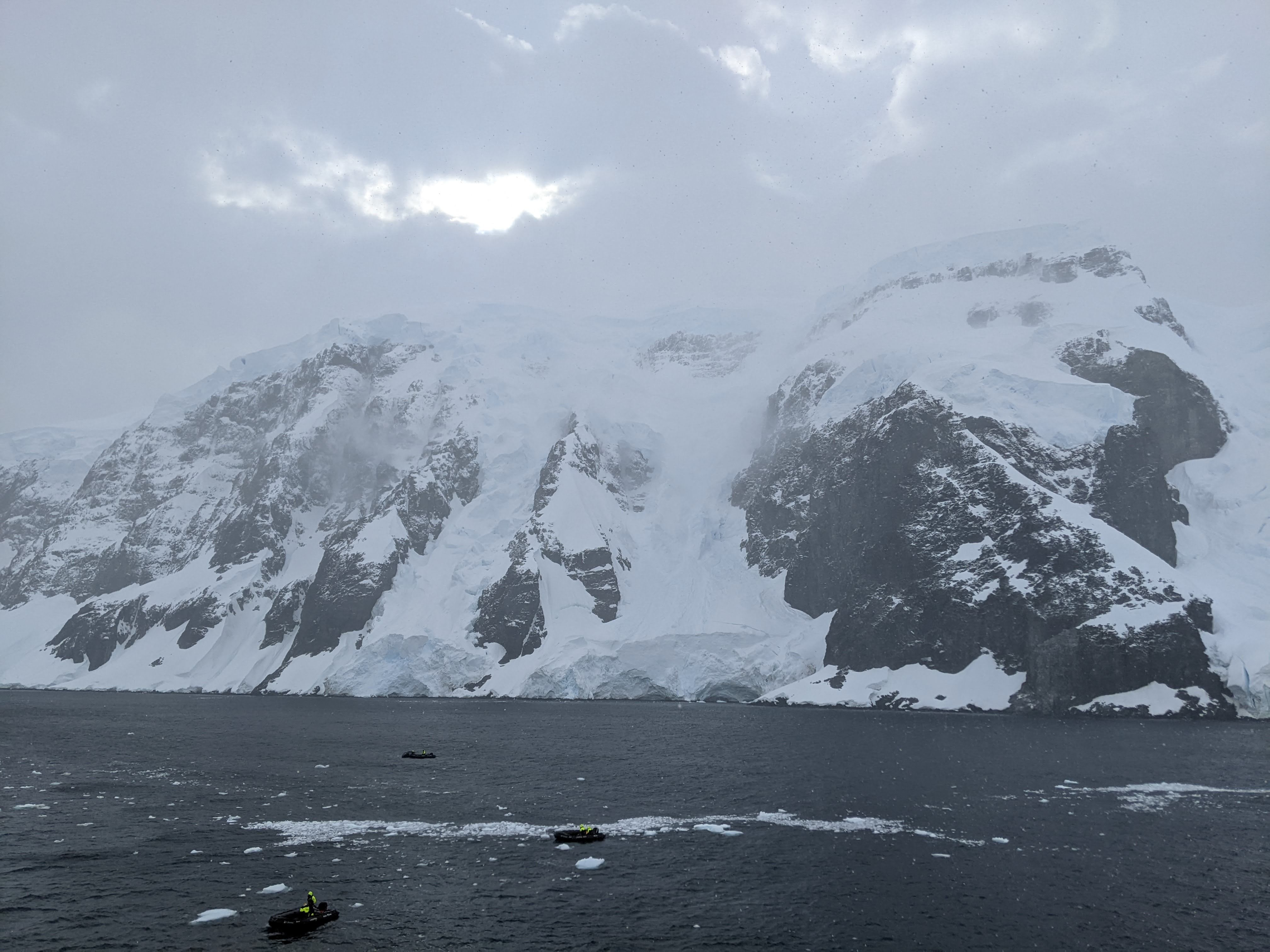
Lecointe Island from the Pampa Passage between that island and Brabant Island.

== Maps ==
- Antarctic Digital Database (ADD). Scale 1:250000 topographic map of Antarctica. Scientific Committee on Antarctic Research (SCAR). Since 1993, regularly upgraded and updated.
- British Antarctic Territory. Scale 1:200000 topographic map. DOS 610 Series, Sheet W 64 62. Directorate of Overseas Surveys, Tolworth, UK, 1980.
- Brabant Island to Argentine Islands. Scale 1:250000 topographic map. British Antarctic Survey, 2008.
