= Petroff Point =

Rocky point in the Palmer Archipelago, Antarctica

Location of Brabant Island in the Antarctic Peninsula region.

Petroff Point (Bulgarian: Петров нос, ‘Petrov Nos’ \pe-'trov 'nos\) is a rocky point on the east coast of Brabant Island in the Palmer Archipelago, Antarctica projecting northeastwards 1.2 km into Hill Bay. Situated 3.85 km northwest of Mitchell Point and 6.8 km southwest of Spallanzani Point.

The point is named for the "Bulgarian-American inventor Peter Petroff (1919–2003) who developed the first digital watch."

== Location ==
Petroff Point is located at 64°11′13″S 62°05′27″W. British mapping in 1980.

== Maps ==
- Antarctic Digital Database (ADD). Scale 1:250000 topographic map of Antarctica. Scientific Committee on Antarctic Research (SCAR). Since 1993, regularly upgraded and updated.
- British Antarctic Territory. Scale 1:200000 topographic map. DOS 610 Series, Sheet W 64 62. Directorate of Overseas Surveys, Tolworth, UK, 1980.
- Brabant Island to Argentine Islands. Scale 1:250000 topographic map. British Antarctic Survey, 2008.
