= Lecointe Island =

Island in Palmer Archipelago, Antarctica

- Location of Lecointe Island

- Location in Antarctica Lecointe Island (Antarctica)

Geography
- Location: Antarctica
- Coordinates: 64°14′38.93″S 62°3′10.23″W
- Archipelago: Palmer Archipelago
- Length: 7.27 km (4.517 mi)
- Width: 2.2 km (1.37 mi)
- Highest elevation: 700 m (2300 ft)

Administration
- Administered under the Antarctic Treaty System

Demographics
- Population: Uninhabited

Lecointe Island is an elongated island, 7.27 km (4.52 mi) long between Cape Kaiser and Hvarchil Point, 2.2 km (1.4 mi) wide and 700 m (2,300 ft) high, separated from the east coast of Brabant Island by Pampa Passage, in the Palmer Archipelago, Antarctica.

The island was first roughly surveyed by the Belgian Antarctic Expedition, 1897–99, which gave the name Cape Kaiser to its northern extremity. The island was surveyed and photographed by several British expeditions, 1955–58, and was named by the Falkland Islands Dependencies Survey for Georges Lecointe, second-in-command and surveyor of the Belgian expedition which was responsible for the first survey of Gerlache Strait.

It is also known as Isla Kaiser and Isla Alice.

== Gallery ==
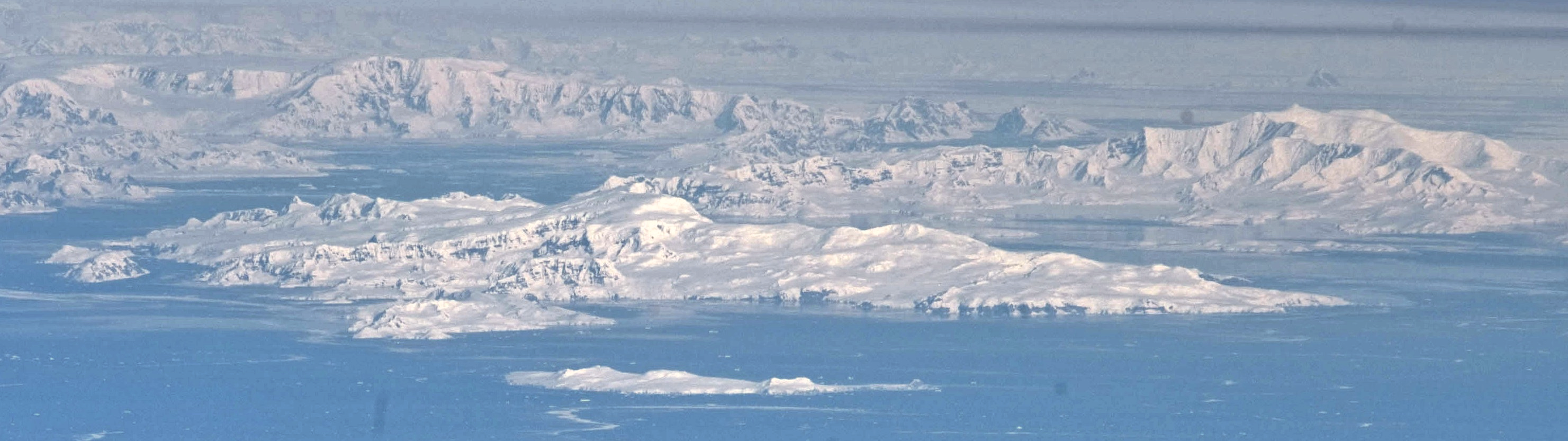
Brabant Island seen from northeast, with the smaller Hoseason Island and Liège Islands in the foreground, and Anvers Island (on the right) and the Antarctic Peninsula in the background. Lecointe Island lies to the left of Brabant Island, separated by a narrow channel (the Pampa Passage) of water.

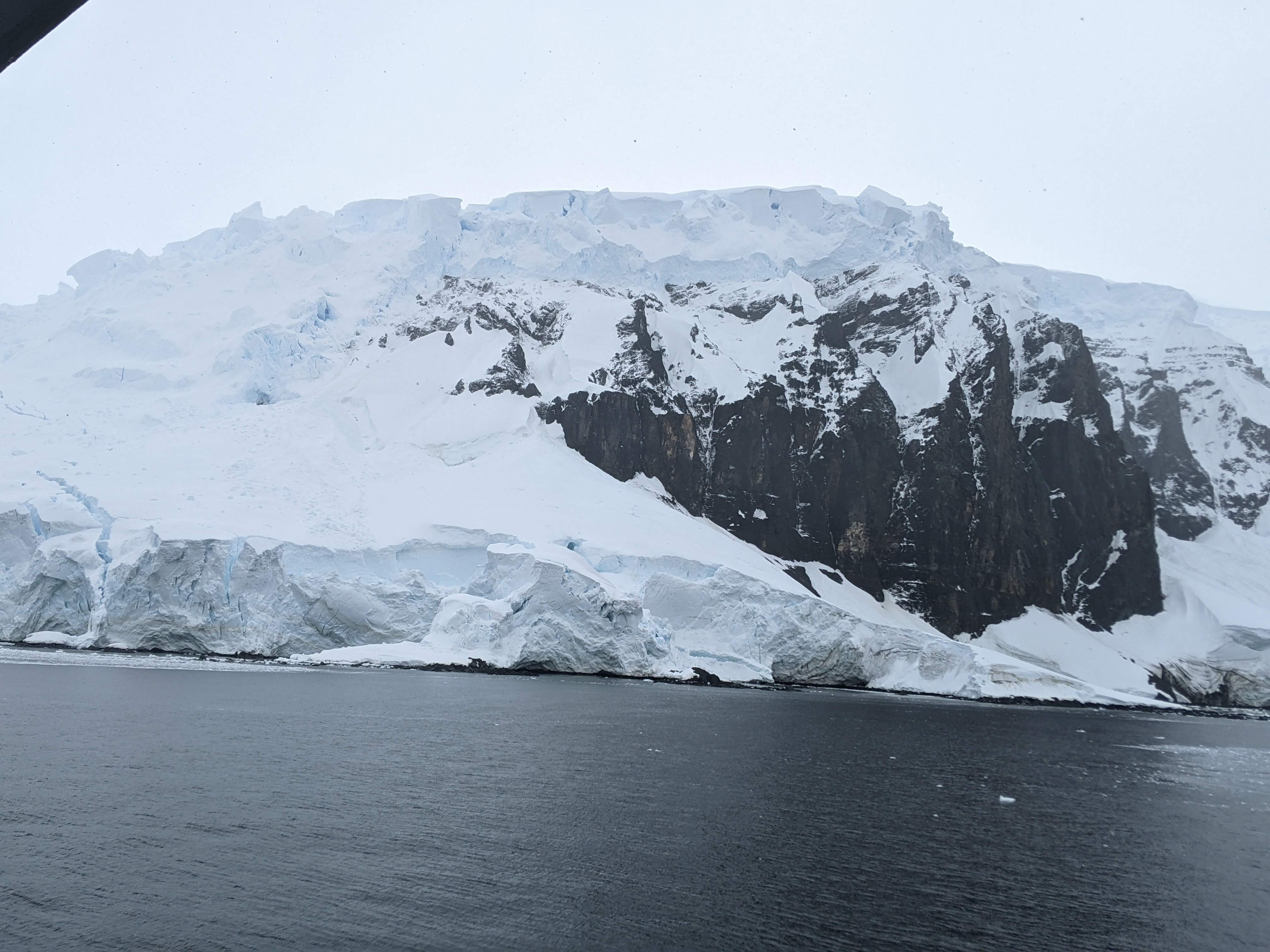
Lecointe Island from the Pampa Passage between that island and Brabant Island.

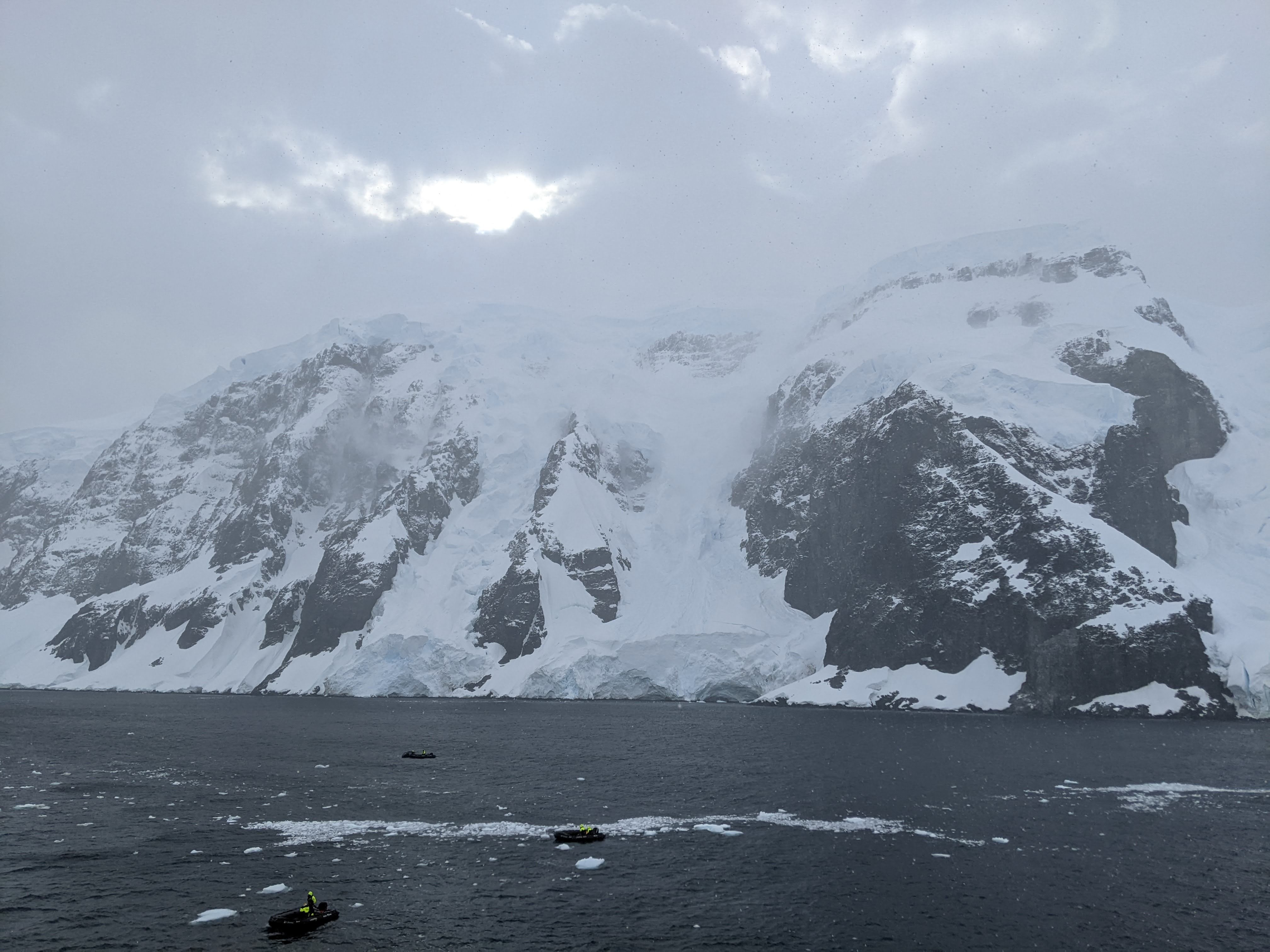
Lecointe Island from the Pampa Passage between that island and Brabant Island.

== Maps ==
- Antarctic Digital Database (ADD). Scale 1:250000 topographic map of Antarctica. Scientific Committee on Antarctic Research (SCAR). Since 1993, regularly upgraded and updated.
- British Antarctic Territory. Scale 1:200000 topographic map. DOS 610 Series, Sheet W 64 62. Directorate of Overseas Surveys, Tolworth, UK, 1980.
- Brabant Island to Argentine Islands. Scale 1:250000 topographic map. British Antarctic Survey, 2008.

== See also ==
- Composite Antarctic Gazetteer
- List of Antarctic and sub-Antarctic islands
- List of Antarctic islands south of 60° S
- SCAR
- Territorial claims in Antarctica
