= Pinel Point =

Pinel Point (64°21′S 62°12′W) is a point lying 5 nautical miles (9 km) northeast of D'Ursel Point on the east side of Brabant Island, in the Palmer Archipelago. First roughly charted by the Belgian Antarctic Expedition, 1897–99, under Gerlache. Photographed by Hunting Aerosurveys Ltd. in 1956–57, and mapped from these photos in 1959. Named by the United Kingdom Antarctic Place-Names Committee (UK-APC) for Philippe Pinel (1745–1826), French physician who held advanced views on investigation of disease and first succeeded in abolishing severe physical restraints on mental cases, in 1796.
