= Hippocrates Glacier =

Glacier in Palmer Archipelago, Antarctica

- Location of Brabant Island in the Antarctic Peninsula region

- Location within Antarctica
- Location: Palmer Archipelago
- Coordinates: 64°22′S 62°22′W
- Length: 3 nmi (6 km; 3 mi)
- Width: 2 nmi (4 km; 2 mi)
- Thickness: unknown
- Terminus: east of Buls Bay
- Status: unknown

Hippocrates Glacier (64°22′S 62°22′W) is a glacier at least 3 nautical miles (6 km) long and 2 nautical miles (4 km) wide, draining the southeast slopes of Stribog Mountains and flowing southeast between Solvay Mountains and Gutsal Ridge into Buls Bay on the east side of Brabant Island, in the Palmer Archipelago, Antarctica. It was shown on an Argentine government chart in 1953, but not named. The glacier was photographed by Hunting Aerosurveys Ltd in 1956–57, and mapped from these photos in 1959. It was named by the UK Antarctic Place-Names Committee for Hippocrates, a Greek physician and author of numerous works on medicine, who also established a professional code of medical conduct.

== See also ==
- List of glaciers in the Antarctic
- Glaciology

== Maps ==
- Antarctic Digital Database (ADD). Scale 1:250000 topographic map of Antarctica. Scientific Committee on Antarctic Research (SCAR). Since 1993, regularly upgraded and updated.
- British Antarctic Territory. Scale 1:200000 topographic map. DOS 610 Series, Sheet W 64 62. Directorate of Overseas Surveys, Tolworth, UK, 1980.
- Brabant Island to Argentine Islands. Scale 1:250000 topographic map. British Antarctic Survey, 2008.
