= Mackenzie Glacier =

Glacier in Antarctica

- Location of Bradant Island in the Antarctic Peninsula region

- Location within Antarctica
- Location: Palmer Archipelago
- Coordinates: 64°17′S 62°16′W
- Length: 4 nmi (7 km; 5 mi)
- Thickness: unknown
- Terminus: Malpighi Glacier
- Status: unknown

Mackenzie Glacier (64°17′S 62°16′W) is a glacier 4 nautical miles (7 km) long flowing eastward from Mount Parry to join Malpighi Glacier at the east coast of Brabant Island, in the Palmer Archipelago, Antarctica. It was first roughly charted by the Belgian Antarctic Expedition, 1897–99, under Gerlache, was photographed by Hunting Aerosurveys Ltd in 1956–57, and was mapped from these photos in 1959. The glacier was named by the UK Antarctic Place-Names Committee for Scottish physician Sir James Mackenzie, a pioneer of studies of heart disease.

== See also ==
- List of glaciers in the Antarctic
- Glaciology

== Maps ==
- Antarctic Digital Database (ADD). Scale 1:250000 topographic map of Antarctica. Scientific Committee on Antarctic Research (SCAR). Since 1993, regularly upgraded and updated.
- British Antarctic Territory. Scale 1:200000 topographic map. DOS 610 Series, Sheet W 64 62. Directorate of Overseas Surveys, Tolworth, UK, 1980.
- Brabant Island to Argentine Islands. Scale 1:250000 topographic map. British Antarctic Survey, 2008.
