= Hill Bay =

Bay in Antarctica

Location of Brabant Island in the Antarctic Peninsula region.

Hill Bay (64°11′S 62°8′W) is a bay, 5 nautical miles (9 km) long and 2 nautical miles (4 km) wide, which indents eastern Anvers Island, Antarctica, between Spallanzani Point and Mitchell Point. Its head is fed by Grigorov, Laënnec and Mitev Glaciers.

The bay was roughly surveyed by the Admiralty Hydrographic Unit, 1951–52, and was named by the UK Antarctic Place-Names Committee for Leonard C. Hill of the Discovery Investigations, who served as an officer on RRS William Scoresby in January–February 1931, and on every Antarctic commission of RRS Discovery II between 1931 and 1939.

== Maps ==
- Antarctic Digital Database (ADD). Scale 1:250000 topographic map of Antarctica. Scientific Committee on Antarctic Research (SCAR). Since 1993, regularly upgraded and updated.
- British Antarctic Territory. Scale 1:200000 topographic map. DOS 610 Series, Sheet W 64 62. Directorate of Overseas Surveys, Tolworth, UK, 1980.
- Brabant Island to Argentine Islands. Scale 1:250000 topographic map. British Antarctic Survey, 2008.
