= Laënnec Glacier =

Glacier in Antarctica

- Location of Brabant Island in the Antarctic Peninsula region

- Location within Antarctica
- Location: Palmer Archipelago
- Coordinates: 64°12′S 62°13′W
- Length: 3 nmi (6 km; 3 mi)
- Thickness: unknown
- Terminus: Hill Bay
- Status: unknown

Laënnec Glacier (64°12′S 62°13′W) is a glacier 3 nautical miles (6 km) long draining the northeast slopes of Stribog Mountains and the northwest slopes of Avroleva Heights, and flowing northeast into Hill Bay on the east side of Brabant Island, in the Palmer Archipelago, Antarctica.

The glacier was photographed by Hunting Aerosurveys Ltd in 1956–57, and mapped from these photos in 1959. It was named by the UK Antarctic Place-Names Committee for René Laennec, the French inventor of the stethoscope and a pioneer investigator of chest diseases.

== See also ==
- List of glaciers in the Antarctic
- Glaciology

== Maps ==
- Antarctic Digital Database (ADD). Scale 1:250000 topographic map of Antarctica. Scientific Committee on Antarctic Research (SCAR). Since 1993, regularly upgraded and updated.
- British Antarctic Territory. Scale 1:200000 topographic map. DOS 610 Series, Sheet W 64 62. Directorate of Overseas Surveys, Tolworth, UK, 1980.
- Brabant Island to Argentine Islands. Scale 1:250000 topographic map. British Antarctic Survey, 2008.
