= Mitchell Point (Antarctica) =

Mitchell Point (64°13′S 62°3′W) is a point at the southern side of the entrance to Hill Bay on the east coast of Brabant Island in the Palmer Archipelago of Antarctica. It was photographed by Hunting Aerosurveys Ltd in 1956 to 1957, and was mapped from these photos in 1959. The point was named by the UK Antarctic Place-Names Committee for American surgeon Silas W. Mitchell, the founder of neurology in the United States.

== Maps ==
- Antarctic Digital Database (ADD). Scale 1:250000 topographic map of Antarctica. Scientific Committee on Antarctic Research (SCAR). Since 1993, regularly upgraded and updated.
- British Antarctic Territory. Scale 1:200000 topographic map. DOS 610 Series, Sheet W 64 62. Directorate of Overseas Surveys, Tolworth, UK, 1980.
- Brabant Island to Argentine Islands. Scale 1:250000 topographic map. British Antarctic Survey, 2008.
