= Mount Parry =

Mountain in Antarctica

- Location within Antarctica

Highest point
- Elevation: 2,520 m (8,270 ft)
- Prominence: 2,520 m (8,270 ft)
- Listing: Ultra, Ribu
- Coordinates: 64°16′S 62°25′W

Geography
- Location: Brabant Island, Antarctica

Climbing
- First ascent: 30 October 1984

Mount Parry is a mountain in Stribog Mountains, Antarctica (within the claims of the United Kingdom, Argentina and Chile) with an elevation of 2,520 metres (8,268 ft). Mount Parry rises eastward of Minot Point and dominates the central portion of Brabant Island, in the Palmer Archipelago. It has steep and partly ice-free north and west slopes, and surmounts Djerassi Glacier to the north-northwest, Mackenzie Glacier to the east, Balanstra Glacier to the south-southeast and Pirogov Glacier to the southwest.

Mount Parry was first ascended by the British Joint Services Expedition led by John Furse on 30 October 1984.

== Etymology ==
The peak appears to have been named by Captain Henry Foster, Royal Navy, of the Chanticleer expedition in 1829 and since has gained international usage.

== Maps ==
- Antarctic Digital Database (ADD). Scale 1:250000 topographic map of Antarctica. Scientific Committee on Antarctic Research (SCAR), 1993–2016.
- British Antarctic Territory. Scale 1:200000 topographic map. DOS 610 Series, Sheet W 64 62. Directorate of Overseas Surveys, Tolworth, UK, 1980.
- Brabant Island to Argentine Islands. Scale 1:250000 topographic map. British Antarctic Survey, 2008.

== Gallery ==
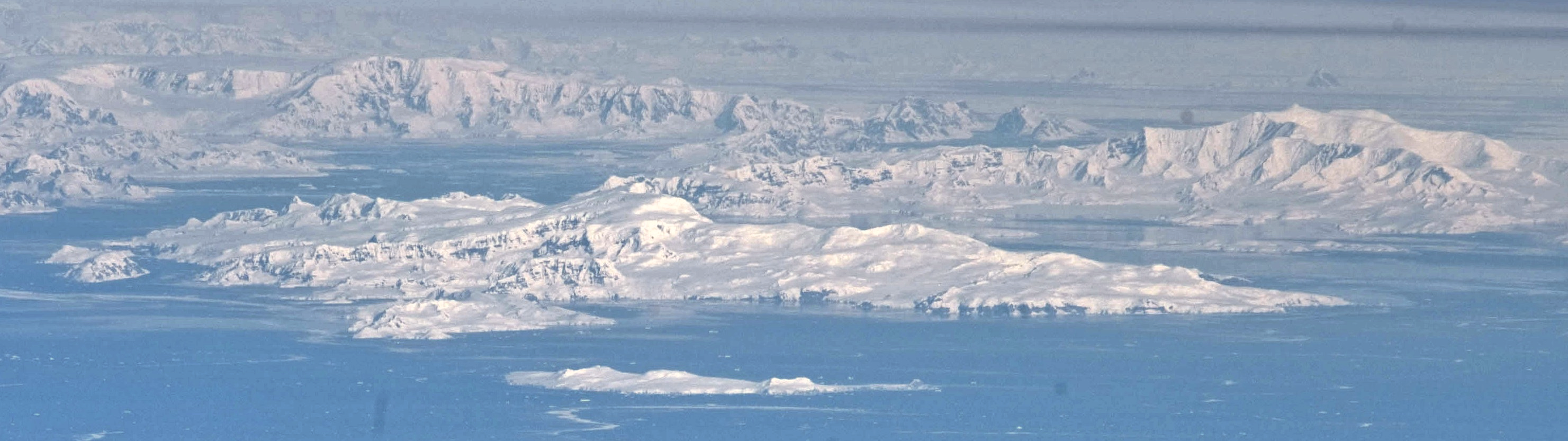
Brabant Island seen from northeast, with Mount Parry in its central part, and Anvers Island (on the right) and Antarctic Peninsula in the background.

== See also ==
- List of Ultras of Antarctica
- Stribog Mountains
- Brabant Island
