= Pare Glacier =

Glacier in Antarctica

- Location of Brabant Island in the Antarctic Peninsula region

- Location within Antarctica
- Location: Palmer Archipelago
- Coordinates: 64°8′S 62°13′W
- Length: 7 nmi (13 km; 8 mi)
- Width: 1 nmi (2 km; 1 mi)
- Thickness: unknown
- Terminus: Bouquet Bay
- Status: unknown

Paré Glacier (64°8′S 62°13′W) is a glacier 7 nautical miles (13 km) long and 1 nautical mile (1.9 km) wide, draining the northeast slopes of Stribog Mountains, and flowing east and then northeast into the head of Bouquet Bay on the northeast side of Brabant Island in the Palmer Archipelago, Antarctica.

The feature was shown on an Argentine government chart in 1953, but not named. Photographed by Hunting Aerosurveys Ltd in 1956–57, and mapped from these photos in 1959. Named by the United Kingdom Antarctic Place-Names Committee (UK-APC) for Ambroise Paré (1510–1590), French surgeon who first taught the importance of clean wound dressings, improved operative techniques and fracture treatment.

== See also ==
- List of glaciers in the Antarctic
- Glaciology

== Maps ==
- Antarctic Digital Database (ADD). Scale 1:250000 topographic map of Antarctica. Scientific Committee on Antarctic Research (SCAR). Since 1993, regularly upgraded and updated.
- British Antarctic Territory. Scale 1:200000 topographic map. DOS 610 Series, Sheet W 64 62. Directorate of Overseas Surveys, Tolworth, UK, 1980.
- Brabant Island to Argentine Islands. Scale 1:250000 topographic map. British Antarctic Survey, 2008.
