= Stribog Mountains =

Mountain system of Brabant Island, Antarctica

Location of Brabant Island in the Antarctic Peninsula region.

Stribog Mountains (Bulgarian: планина Стрибог, ‘Planina Stribog’ \pla-ni-'na 'stri-bog\) is the principal mountain system of Brabant Island in the Palmer Archipelago, Antarctica rising to 2498 m (Mount Parry). The feature is 40 km long in north-south direction and 15 km wide, connected to Stavertsi Ridge on the northeast by Viamata Saddle, to Avroleva Heights on the east by Doriones Saddle, and to Solvay Mountains on the south by Aluzore Gap. It is heavily glaciated, with steeper and partly ice-free west slopes.

The mountains are named after the Slavic god of wind, ice and cold Stribog.

== Location ==
Stribog Mountains are centred at 64°12′00″S 62°20′00″W. British mapping in 1980 and 2008.

== Maps ==
- Antarctic Digital Database (ADD). Scale 1:250000 topographic map of Antarctica. Scientific Committee on Antarctic Research (SCAR). Since 1993, regularly upgraded and updated.
- British Antarctic Territory. Scale 1:200000 topographic map. DOS 610 Series, Sheet W 64 62. Directorate of Overseas Surveys, Tolworth, UK, 1980.
- Brabant Island to Argentine Islands. Scale 1:250000 topographic map. British Antarctic Survey, 2008.
