= Brabant Island =

Island in the Palmer Archipelago in the British Antarctic Territory

- Location of Brabant Island (in red)

- Location in Antarctica

Geography
- Location: Antarctica
- Coordinates: 64°15′S 62°20′W
- Archipelago: Palmer Archipelago
- Area: 1,770 km^{2} (680 sq mi)
- Length: 59 km (36.7 mi)
- Width: 30 km (19 mi)
- Highest elevation: 2,520 m (8270 ft)
- Highest point: Mount Parry

Administration
- Administered under the Antarctic Treaty System

Demographics
- Population: Uninhabited

Brabant Island is the second largest island of the Palmer Archipelago within the British Antarctic Territory, lying between Anvers Island and Liège Island. Brabant Island is 59 km (37 mi) long north-south, 30 km (19 mi) wide, and rises to 2,520 m (8,268 ft) in Mount Parry. The interior of the island is occupied by two mountain ranges, Solvay Mountains (Cook Summit, 1590 m) in its southern part and Stribog Mountains (summit Mount Parry) in its central and northern parts.

It was named by the Belgian Antarctic Expedition (1897–1899) under Adrien de Gerlache, who named it after the Belgian Province of Brabant, in recognition of the support given to the expedition by its citizens.

A paper summarizing the Joint Services expedition of 1984–1985 describes the island as "notoriously inhospitable" and states that there is evidence for only six visits between the discovery in 1898 and 1984. Members of the expedition overwintered there in 1984–1985, and made the first ascent of Mount Parry.

== History ==
On 6 February 2024, for the first time since 2017, British Royal Navy personnel from HMS Protector landed on the island in an effort to clear three tonnes of waste and abandoned equipment from the 1980s antarctic expedition.

== Geology ==
The Brabant Island Tectonic Block includes up to 2000 m of basaltic-andesitic lavas and volcaniclastics, possibly corresponding to the Lower Cretaceous Antarctic Peninsula Volcanic Group of the Danco Coast. This group is intruded by a granodiorite sill and Early Eocene hypabyssal dykes. Late Tertiary to Pleistocene basaltic lavas uncomformably overlay this complex.

== Maps ==
- Antarctic Digital Database (ADD). Scale 1:250000 topographic map of Antarctica. Scientific Committee on Antarctic Research (SCAR). Since 1993, regularly upgraded and updated.
- British Antarctic Territory. Scale 1:200000 topographic map. DOS 610 Series, Sheet W 64 62. Directorate of Overseas Surveys, Tolworth, UK, 1980.
- Brabant Island to Argentine Islands. Scale 1:250000 topographic map. British Antarctic Survey, 2008.

== Gallery ==
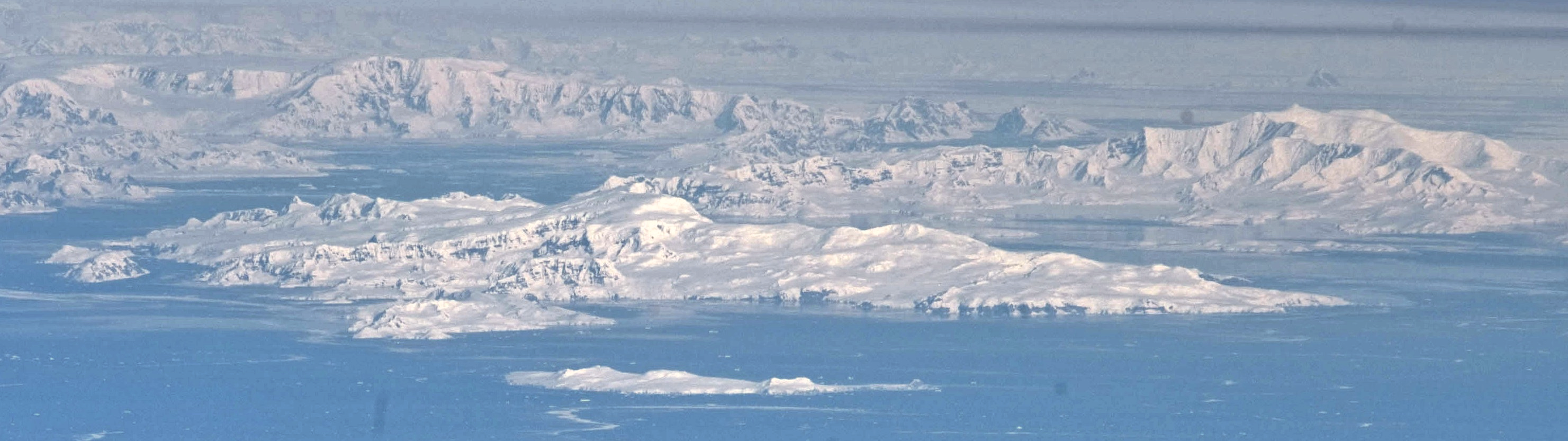
Brabant Island seen from northeast, with the smaller Hoseason Island and Liège Islands in the foreground, and Anvers Island (on the right) and the Antarctic Peninsula in the background. Lecointe Island lies to the left of Brabant Island, separated by a narrow channel of water.

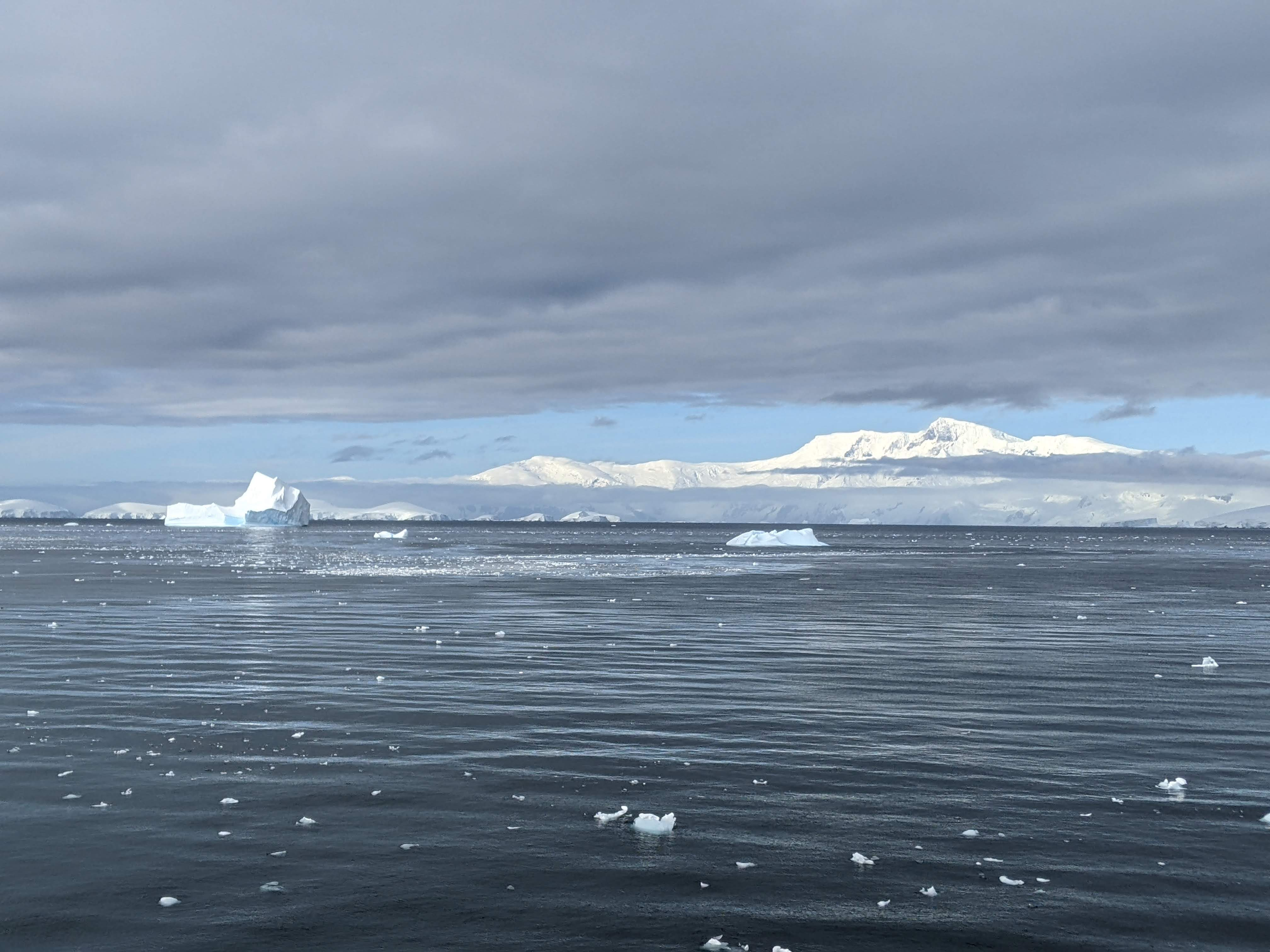
Brabant Island, as seen from Patagonia Bay. Patagonia Bay is within Anvers Island, seen behind Brabant Island in the previous picture.

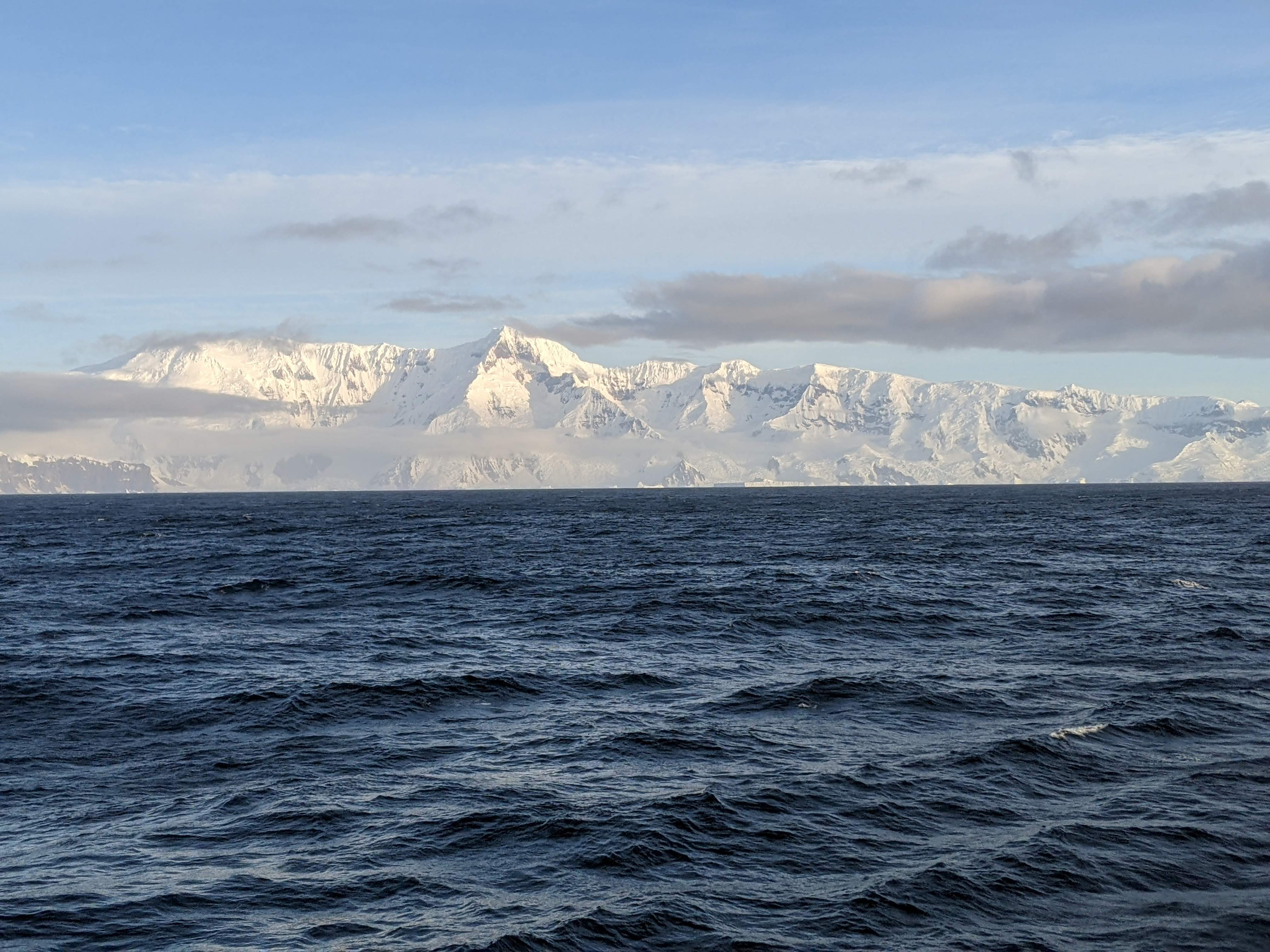
A view of Brabant Island from north of the Melchior Islands. The small and low Melchior Islands are visible between Brabant and Anvers Islands in the first picture above.

== See also ==
- Gerlache Strait Geology
- Composite Antarctic Gazetteer
- List of Antarctic and sub-Antarctic islands
- List of Antarctic islands south of 60° S
- SCAR
- Territorial claims in Antarctica
