= Bulgarian toponyms in Antarctica (S) =

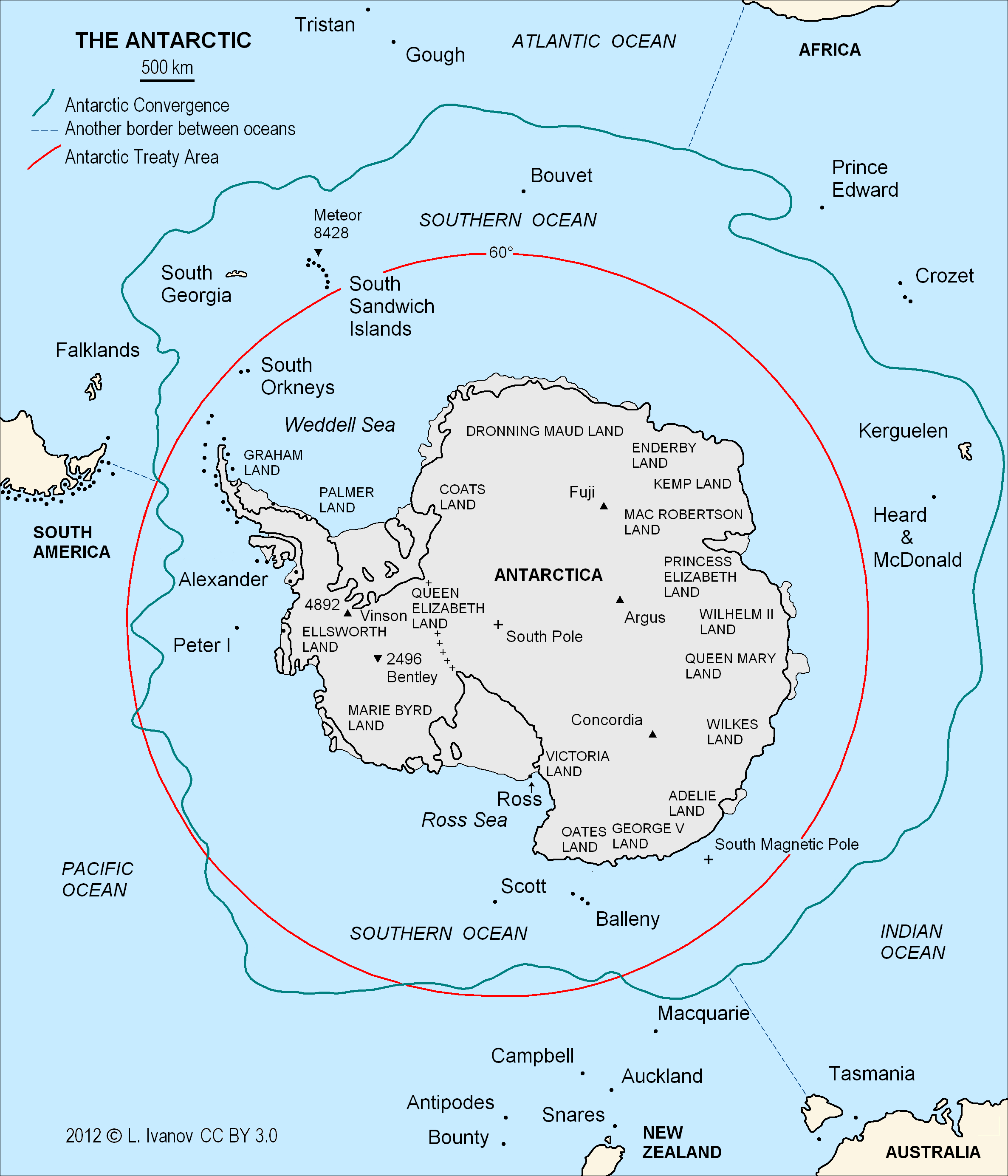
The South Polar Region.

- Sàbat Hill, Livingston Island
- Sabazios Glacier, Sentinel Range
- Sabin Point, Nelson Island
- Sadala Point, Robert Island
- Saedinenie Snowfield, Livingston Island
- Saffar Island, Elephant Island
- Sagita Island, Astrolabe Island
- Sakar Peak, Livingston Island
- Salash Nunatak, Greenwich Island
- Saldobisa Cove, Trinity Island
- Samodiva Glacier, Davis Coast
- Samokov Knoll, Livingston Island
- Samotino Point, Nordenskjöld Coast
- Samuel Point, Livingston Island
- San Stefano Peak, Rugged Island
- Sandanski Point, Livingston Island
- Sandilh Point, Oscar II Coast
- Saparevo Glacier, Smith Island
- Mount Sara Teodora, Oscar II Coast
- Mount Sarnegor, Brabant Island
- Satovcha Peak, Alexander Island
- Mount Schuyler, Trinity Peninsula
- Sea Lion Glacier, Livingston Island
- Sea Lion Tarn, Livingston Island
- Sekirna Spur, Oscar II Coast
- Semela Ridge, Loubet Coast
- Senokos Nunatak, Trinity Peninsula
- Serdica Peak, Livingston Island
- Sestrimo Glacier, Trinity Peninsula
- Sevar Point, Livingston Island
- Sevlievo Knoll, Snow Island
- Sevlievski Peak, Smith Island
- Sevtopolis Peak, Greenwich Island
- Seydol Crag, Trinity Peninsula
- Sexaginta Prista Bay, Oscar II Coast
- Shabla Knoll, Livingston Island
- Shapkarev Buttress, Fallières Coast
- Sherba Ridge, Loubet Coast
- Sheynovo Peak, Brabant Island
- Shipka Saddle, Livingston Island
- Shipka Valley, Livingston Island
- Shipot Point, Robert Island
- Shishman Peak, Livingston Island
- Shopski Cove, Greenwich Island
- Shterna Glacier, Liège Island
- Shumen Peak, Livingston Island
- Shut Island, Wilhelm Archipelago
- Sigmen Glacier, Liège Island
- Sigritsa Point, Livingston Island
- Sikera Valley, Sentinel Range
- Silistra Knoll, Livingston Island
- Silyanov Peak, Sentinel Range
- Simeon Peak, Livingston Island
- Simeonov Island, South Orkney Islands
- Simitli Point, Rugged Island
- Simms Rock, Livingston Island
- Sindel Point, Livingston Island
- Sinemorets Hill, Livingston Island
- Siniger Nunatak, Trinity Peninsula
- Sinion Glacier, Nordenskjöld Coast
- Sinitovo Gap, Danco Coast
- Sintika Cove, Elephant Island
- Sipey Bluff, Sentinel Range
- Siren Lake, Livingston Island
- Sirma Glacier, Sentinel Range
- Sisson Rock, Livingston Island
- Sitalk Peak, Livingston Island
- Skafida Peak, Sentinel Range
- Skaidava Bay, Alexander Island
- Skakavitsa Peak, Trinity Peninsula
- Skaklya Glacier, Sentinel Range
- Skalina Point, Smith Island
- Skamni Saddle, Sentinel Range
- Skaplizo Glacier, Clarence Island
- Skaptopara Cove, Greenwich Island
- Skoba Island, Wilhelm Archipelago
- Skomlya Hill, Trinity Peninsula
- Skoparnik Bluff, Trinity Peninsula
- Škorpil Glacier, Loubet Coast
- Skravena Cove, Livingston Island
- Skrino Rocks, Robert Island
- Sladun Peninsula, Danco Coast
- Slanchev Bryag Cove, South Orkney Islands
- Slatina Peak, Smith Island
- Slav Point, Oscar II Coast
- Slaveykov Peak, Smith Island
- Slavotin Point, Nelson Island
- Slavyanka Beach, Elephant Island
- Sliven Peak, Livingston Island
- Slomer Cove, Trinity Peninsula
- Smilets Point, Nelson Island
- Smilyan Bastion, Loubet Coast
- Smin Peak, Trinity Peninsula
- Smirnenski Point, Robert Island
- Smith Cove, Clarence Island
- Smochevo Cove, Low Island
- Smokinya Cove, Trinity Peninsula
- Smolensk Strait, South Shetland Islands
- Smolyan Point, Livingston Island
- Smyadovo Cove, Rugged Island
- Snegotin Ridge, Trinity Peninsula
- Snellius Glacier, Elephant Island
- Soatris Island, Brabant Island
- Sofia Peak, Livingston Island
- Sofia University Mountains, Alexander Island
- Sokol Point, Graham Coast
- Solari Bay, Nordenskjöld Coast
- Solnik Point, Low Island
- Solun Glacier, Loubet Coast
- Somovit Point, Robert Island
- Sonketa Ridge, Danco Coast
- Sopot Ice Piedmont, Livingston Island
- Sostra Heights, Sentinel Range
- Soyka Saddle, Clarence Island
- Sozopol Gap, Livingston Island
- Spanish Knoll, Livingston Island
- Spanish Point, Livingston Island
- Sparadok Point, Livingston Island
- Spartacus Peak, Livingston Island
- Spatnik Island, Wilhelm Archipelago
- Spoluka Point, Nordenskjöld Coast
- Sprey Island, Wilhelm Archipelago
- Sratsimir Hill, Davis Coast
- Srebarna Glacier, Livingston Island
- Sredets Point, Smith Island
- Srednogorie Heights, Trinity Peninsula
- Sredorek Peak, Davis Coast
- Srem Gap, Trinity Peninsula
- St. Angelariy Peak, Oscar II Coast
- St. Boris Peak, Livingston Island
- St. Brigid Island, Biscoe Islands
- St. Christopher Island, Biscoe Islands
- St. Cyril Peak, Livingston Island
- St. Evtimiy Crag, Livingston Island
- St. Gorazd Peak, Oscar II Coast
- St. Isidore Island, Biscoe Islands
- St. Ivan Rilski Col, Livingston Island
- St. Kiprian Peak, Greenwich Island
- St. Kliment Ohridski Base, Livingston Island
- St. Methodius Peak, Livingston Island
- St. Naum Peak, Livingston Island
- St. Nicholas Cove, South Orkney Islands
- St. Sava Peak, Oscar II Coast
- St. Sofroniy Knoll, Snow Island
- St. Theodosius Nunatak, Alexander Island
- Stambolov Crag, Livingston Island
- Stancheva Peak, Foyn Coast
- Stargel Peak, Oscar II Coast
- Starmen Point, Graham Coast
- Starosel Gate, Livingston Island
- Stavertsi Ridge, Brabant Island
- Stefan Karadzha Peak, Graham Coast
- Stego Island, Wilhelm Archipelago
- Stevrek Ridge, Oscar II Coast
- Stikal Peak, Sentinel Range
- Stob Glacier, Oscar II Coast
- Stolnik Peak, Sentinel Range
- Storgozia Nunatak, Nordenskjöld Coast
- Stoyanov Cove, Livingston Island
- Stoykite Buttress, Nordenskjöld Coast
- Strahil Peak, Sentinel Range
- Strandzha Glacier, Livingston Island
- Strelcha Spur, Graham Coast
- Stresher Peninsula, Graham Coast
- Stribog Mountains, Brabant Island
- Strinava Glacier, Sentinel Range
- Struma Glacier, Livingston Island
- Stryama Peak, Alexander Island
- Stubel Hill, Trinity Peninsula
- Studena Point, Anvers Island
- Suhache Rock, Robert Island
- Suhindol Point, Smith Island
- Sumer Passage, Liège Island
- Suregetes Cove, Krogh Island
- Sursuvul Point, Davis Coast
- Survakari Nunatak, Trinity Peninsula
- Svetlya Peak, Oscar II Coast
- Svetovrachene Glacier, Brabant Island
- Svetulka Island, Robert Island
- Svilengrad Peninsula, Davis Coast
- Svishtov Cove, Livingston Island
- Svoge Knoll, Livingston Island

== See also ==
- Bulgarian toponyms in Antarctica

== Bibliography ==
- J. Stewart. Antarctica: An Encyclopedia. Jefferson, N.C. and London: McFarland, 2011. 1771 pp. ISBN 978-0-7864-3590-6
- L. Ivanov. Bulgarian Names in Antarctica. Sofia: Manfred Wörner Foundation, 2021. Second edition. 539 pp. ISBN 978-619-90008-5-4 (in Bulgarian)
- G. Bakardzhieva. Bulgarian toponyms in Antarctica. Paisiy Hilendarski University of Plovdiv: Research Papers. Vol. 56, Book 1, Part A, 2018 – Languages and Literature, pp. 104-119 (in Bulgarian)
- L. Ivanov and N. Ivanova. Bulgarian names. In: The World of Antarctica. Generis Publishing, 2022. pp. 114-115. ISBN 979-8-88676-403-1
