= Apiaria Bight =

Bay in Antarctica

Location of Brabant Island in the Antarctic Peninsula region.

Apiaria Bight (Bulgarian: залив Апиария, ‘Zaliv Apiaria’ \'za-liv a-pi-'a-ri-ya\) is the 5.7 km wide embayment indenting for 1.7 km the northwest coast of Pasteur Peninsula on Brabant Island in the Palmer Archipelago, Antarctica. It is entered northeast of Metchnikoff Point and southwest of Cape Roux, and has Soatris Island lying near the southwest side of its entrance.

== Eponymy ==
The bight is named after the ancient Roman fortified city and Byzantine bishopric of Apiaria (Appiaria) in Moesia Inferior, now in Northeastern Bulgaria.

== Location ==
Apiaria Bight is centred at 64°01′40″S 62°31′00″W.

- British mapping in 1980 and 2008.

== Maps ==
- Antarctic Digital Database (ADD). Scale 1:250000 topographic map of Antarctica. Scientific Committee on Antarctic Research (SCAR). Since 1993, regularly upgraded and updated.
- British Antarctic Territory. Scale 1:200000 topographic map. DOS 610 Series, Sheet W 64 62. Directorate of Overseas Surveys, Tolworth, UK, 1980.
- Brabant Island to Argentine Islands. Scale 1:250000 topographic map. British Antarctic Survey, 2008.

== Sources ==
- Bulgarian Antarctic Gazetteer. Antarctic Place-names Commission. (details in Bulgarian, basic data in English)
- Apiaria Bight. SCAR Composite Antarctic Gazetteer.
