= Mount Hunter (Antarctica) =

Mountain in Graham Land, Antarctica

Location of Brabant Island in the Antarctic Peninsula region.

Mount Hunter (64°5′S 62°24′W) is a mountain in northern Stribog Mountains, 1,410 metres (4,630 ft) high, standing 4 nautical miles (7 km) west-southwest of Duclaux Point on Pasteur Peninsula, Brabant Island, in the Palmer Archipelago, Antarctica. It surmounts Podayva Glacier to the north, Burevestnik Glacier to the northeast, Lister Glacier to the southeast and Dodelen Glacier to the west.

The mountain was shown on an Argentine government chart in 1953, but not named. It was photographed by Hunting Aerosurveys Ltd in 1956–57, and mapped from these photos in 1959. The feature was named by the UK Antarctic Place-Names Committee for John Hunter, a British surgeon, comparative anatomist and physiologist, who revolutionized the approach to surgery as an exact science in relation to other aspects of medicine.

== Maps ==
- Antarctic Digital Database (ADD). Scale 1:250000 topographic map of Antarctica. Scientific Committee on Antarctic Research (SCAR). Since 1993, regularly upgraded and updated.
- British Antarctic Territory. Scale 1:200000 topographic map. DOS 610 Series, Sheet W 64 62. Directorate of Overseas Surveys, Tolworth, UK, 1980.
- Brabant Island to Argentine Islands. Scale 1:250000 topographic map. British Antarctic Survey, 2008.
