= Sladen =

Sladen may refer to:

== Surname ==
- Sladen Peltier, Canadian actor
- Art Sladen (1860–1914), Major League Baseball player
- Arthur Sladen (1877–1934), English cricketer
- Constance Sladen (1848–1906), architectural historian and philanthropist
- Charles Sladen (1816–1884), Australian colonial politician
- Douglas Sladen (1856–1947), English author and professor at the University of Sydney
- Edward Bosc Sladen (1827–1890), British army officer
- Elisabeth Sladen (1946–2011), English actress
- Frederick Sladen (1876–1921), British-Canadian apiculturist
- Fred Winchester Sladen (1867–1945), superintendent of the U.S. Military Academy
- Joseph A. Sladen (1841–1911), U.S. Army general
- Percy Sladen (1849–1900), English biologist
- Sidney Sladen (born 1979), Kenya-born fashion designer
- Victoria Sladen (1910–1999), an opera singer in the 1952 radio opera Anna Kraus
- William J. L. Sladen (1920–2017), Welsh-American naturalist

== Other uses ==
- Mount Sladen, on Coronation Island
- Percy Sladen Memorial Trust, a trust fund administered by the Linnean Society in memory of Percy Sladen
- Sladen's barbet, a species of bird found in Africa
- Sladen suit, a type of British drysuit, designed for diving
- Sladen Summit, Antarctica

== See also ==
- Sladenia (disambiguation)
- Sladeniae, a synonym for the Fernando Po swift
