= Marinka =

Marinka (Bulgarian: Маринка, Ukrainian: Мар'їнка) may refer to:

== Places ==
- Marinka, Bulgaria
- Marinka, Ukraine
- Marinka Point, Antarctica

== People ==
- Rinrin Marinka (Maria Irene Susanto, born 1980), Indonesian chef
- Marinka Gurewich (1902–1990), American voice teacher
- Marinka Khachatryan (born 1997), Armenian actress

== Other uses ==
- Marinka (operetta), by Emmerich Kálmán
- Schizothorax, a genus of fish

== See also ==
- Marynka (disambiguation), similarly-named places in Poland
- Maryinka, Vladimir Oblast, a similarly-named village in Russia
