= Levenov Point =

Location of Brabant Island in the Antarctic Peninsula region.

Levenov Point (Bulgarian: Левенов нос, ‘Levenov Nos’ \le-'ve-nov 'nos\) is the rock-tipped point on the northeast coast of Pasteur Peninsula on Brabant Island in the Palmer Archipelago, Antarctica, formed by an offshoot of Röntgen Peak.

The point is named after Captain Nikola Levenov (1941-2007), commander of the Bulgarian ocean fishing trawler Burevestnik that operated in Antarctic waters off Kerguelen Islands from December 1974 to February 1975, and of the fishing trawler Ofelia in South Georgia waters during its fishing trip from September 1977 to April 1978. The Bulgarian fishermen of the company Ocean Fisheries – Burgas, along with those of the Soviet Union, Poland and East Germany are the pioneers of modern Antarctic fishing industry.”

== Location ==
Levenov Point is located at 64°02′13″S 62°15′57″W, which is 3.04 km southeast of Cape Cockburn and 2.85 km north of Duclaux Point. British mapping in 1980 and 2008.

== Maps ==
- Antarctic Digital Database (ADD). Scale 1:250000 topographic map of Antarctica. Scientific Committee on Antarctic Research (SCAR). Since 1993, regularly upgraded and updated.
- British Antarctic Territory. Scale 1:200000 topographic map. DOS 610 Series, Sheet W 64 62. Directorate of Overseas Surveys, Tolworth, UK, 1980.
- Brabant Island to Argentine Islands. Scale 1:250000 topographic map. British Antarctic Survey, 2008.
