= Soatris Island =

Island in the Palmer Archipelago, Antarctica

Location of Brabant Island in the Antarctic Peninsula region.

Soatris Island (Bulgarian: остров Соатрис, romanized: ostrov Soatris, IPA: [ˈɔstrof suˈatris]) is the rocky island off the northwest coast of Pasteur Peninsula on Brabant Island in the Palmer Archipelago, Antarctica, which extends 400 m in east-southeast to west-northwest direction and is 200 m wide.

The island is named after the ancient Roman settlement of Soatris in Northeastern Bulgaria.

== Location ==
Soatris Island is located at 64°02′00″S 62°34′23″W, which is 5 km west-southwest of Cape Roux, 800 m north of Metchnikoff Point and 9.6 km north by east of Claude Point. British mapping in 1980 and 2008.

== Maps ==
- Antarctic Digital Database (ADD). Scale 1:250000 topographic map of Antarctica. Scientific Committee on Antarctic Research (SCAR). Since 1993, regularly upgraded and updated.
- British Antarctic Territory. Scale 1:200000 topographic map. DOS 610 Series, Sheet W 64 62. Directorate of Overseas Surveys, Tolworth, UK, 1980.
- Brabant Island to Argentine Islands. Scale 1:250000 topographic map. British Antarctic Survey, 2008.
