= Dodelen Glacier =

Glacier in Palmer Archipelago, Antarctica

- Location of Brabant Island in the Antarctic Peninsula region

- Location within Antarctica
- Location: Palmer Archipelago
- Coordinates: 64°04′S 62°29′W
- Length: 2 nmi (4 km; 2 mi)
- Width: 1.5 nmi (3 km; 2 mi)
- Thickness: unknown
- Terminus: Guyou Bay
- Status: unknown

Dodelen Glacier (Bulgarian: ледник Доделен, romanized: lednik Dodelen, IPA: [ˈlɛdniɡ ˈdɔdɛlɛn]) is the 3.6 km long and 2.8 km wide glacier on Pasteur Peninsula, Brabant Island in the Palmer Archipelago, Antarctica, situated southwest of Podayva Glacier, northwest of Lister Glacier and north of Oshane Glacier. It drains the west slopes of Mount Hunter in Stribog Mountains, and flows westwards into Guyou Bay.

The glacier is named after Dodelen River in eastern Balkan Mountains.

== Location ==
Dodelen Glacier is centred at 64°04′00″S 62°29′00″W. British mapping in 1980 and 2008.

== See also ==
- List of glaciers in the Antarctic
- Glaciology

== Maps ==
- Antarctic Digital Database (ADD). Scale 1:250000 topographic map of Antarctica. Scientific Committee on Antarctic Research (SCAR). Since 1993, regularly upgraded and updated.
- British Antarctic Territory. Scale 1:200000 topographic map. DOS 610 Series, Sheet W 64 62. Directorate of Overseas Surveys, Tolworth, UK, 1980.
- Brabant Island to Argentine Islands. Scale 1:250000 topographic map. British Antarctic Survey, 2008.
