= Burevestnik Glacier =

Glacier in Palmer Archipelago, Antarctica

- Location of Brabant Island in the Antarctic Peninsula

- Location within Antarctica
- Location: Palmer Archipelago
- Coordinates: 64°02′20″S 62°21′00″W
- Length: 2.2 nmi (4 km; 3 mi)
- Width: 1.8 nmi (3 km; 2 mi)
- Thickness: unknown
- Terminus: east of Marinka Point
- Status: unknown

Burevestnik Glacier (Bulgarian: ледник Буревестник, romanized: lednik Burevestnik, IPA: [ˈlɛdniɡ borɛˈvɛstnik]) is the 4.2 km long and 3.5 km wide glacier on Pasteur Peninsula, Brabant Island in the Palmer Archipelago, Antarctica, situated east of Podayva Glacier and north of Lister Glacier. It drains the north slopes of Stribog Mountains, flows northeastwards and enters the sea east of Marinka Point and northwest of Levenov Point.

The glacier is named after the Bulgarian ocean fishing trawler Burevestnik of the company Ocean Fisheries – Burgas, which operated under Captain Nikola Levenov in Antarctic waters off Kerguelen Islands from December 1974 to February 1975.

== Location ==
Burevestnik Glacier is centred at 64°02′20″S 62°21′00″W. British mapping in 1980 and 2008.

== See also ==
- List of glaciers in the Antarctic
- Glaciology

== Maps ==
- Antarctic Digital Database (ADD). Scale 1:250000 topographic map of Antarctica. Scientific Committee on Antarctic Research (SCAR). Since 1993, regularly upgraded and updated.
- British Antarctic Territory. Scale 1:200000 topographic map. DOS 610 Series, Sheet W 64 62. Directorate of Overseas Surveys, Tolworth, UK, 1980.
- Brabant Island to Argentine Islands. Scale 1:250000 topographic map. British Antarctic Survey, 2008.
