= Cushing Peak =

Mountain in Antarctica

Location of Brabant Island in the Antarctic Peninsula region.

Cushing Peak (64°6′S 62°25′W) is a peak in the north part of Stribog Mountains, standing 1.5 nautical miles (3 km) southeast of Guyou Bay on Brabant Island in the Palmer Archipelago. It surmounts the head of Lister Glacier to the east and Oshane Glacier to the west.

The peak was shown on an Argentine government chart in 1953, but not named. Photographed by Hunting Aerosurveys Ltd in 1956–57, and mapped from these photos in 1959, it was named by the UK Antarctic Place-Names Committee for Harvey Cushing, an American pioneer of neurosurgery.

== Maps ==
- Antarctic Digital Database (ADD). Scale 1:250000 topographic map of Antarctica. Scientific Committee on Antarctic Research (SCAR). Since 1993, regularly upgraded and updated.
- British Antarctic Territory. Scale 1:200000 topographic map. DOS 610 Series, Sheet W 64 62. Directorate of Overseas Surveys, Tolworth, UK, 1980.
- Brabant Island to Argentine Islands. Scale 1:250000 topographic map. British Antarctic Survey, 2008.
