= St. Nicholas Cove =

Cove in Coronation Island, Southern Ocean

- Map of the South Orkney Islands

- Location in Antarctica
- Coordinates: 60°42′00″S 45°15′50″W
- Max. length: 800 metres (870 yd)
- Max. width: 920 metres (1,010 yd)

St. Nicholas Cove (Bulgarian: залив Св. Никола, ‘Zaliv Sv. Nikola’ \'za-liv sve-'ti ni-'ko-la\) is the 920 m wide cove indenting for 800 m the south coast of Coronation Island in the South Orkney Islands, Antarctica. It is entered southeast of Tophet Point, and surmounted by Tophet Bastion to the north-northwest and Mount Sladen to the north.

The cove is “named after St. Nicholas, the patron saint of fishermen, in connection with the St. Nicholas Professional School of Maritime Shipping and Fishing in Burgas, Bulgaria, a number of whose alumni worked on fishing ships of the company Ocean Fisheries – Burgas in Antarctic waters from 1970 to the early 1990s. The Bulgarian fishermen, along with those of the Soviet Union, Poland and East Germany are the pioneers of modern Antarctic fishing industry.”

== Location ==
St. Nicholas Cove is centred at 60°42′00″S 45°15′50″W. British mapping in 1963.

== Maps ==
- British Antarctic Territory: South Orkney Islands. Scale 1:100000 topographic map. DOS Series 510. Surrey, England: Directorate of Overseas Surveys, 1963
- Antarctic Digital Database (ADD). Scale 1:250000 topographic map of Antarctica. Scientific Committee on Antarctic Research (SCAR). Since 1993, regularly upgraded and updated
