= Simeonov Island =

One of the South Orkney Islands in the Southern Ocean

- Map of the South Orkney Islands

- Location within Antarctica

Geography
- Location: Antarctica
- Coordinates: 60°41′17″S 45°18′47″W
- Archipelago: South Orkney Islands
- Area: 20 ha (49 acres)
- Length: 850 m (2790 ft)
- Width: 390 m (1280 ft)

Administration
- Administered under the Antarctic Treaty System

Demographics
- Population: uninhabited

Simeonov Island (Bulgarian: Симеонов остров, romanized: Simeonov ostrov, IPA: [simɛˈɔnof ˈɔstrof]) is the 850 m long in north-south direction and 390 m wide rocky island with surface area of 20 hectares (49 acres) separated from the south coast of Coronation Island in the South Orkney Islands, Antarctica by a passage narrowing to just 50 m at points. The island faces Slanchev Bryag Cove on the east. It is a new feature that became detached from the main island as a result of glacier retreat in the first decade of 21st century. An abutting smaller island on the south ends up in Saunders Point.

The island is "named after Captain Anastas Simeonov (1929–2003), Director (1976–1982) of the Bulgarian company Ocean Fisheries – Burgas whose ships operated in the waters of South Georgia, Kerguelen, the South Orkney Islands, South Shetland Islands and Antarctic Peninsula from 1970 to the early 1990s. The Bulgarian fishermen, along with those of the Soviet Union, Poland and East Germany are the pioneers of modern Antarctic fishing industry."

== Location ==
Simeonov Island is located at 60°41′17″S 45°18′47″W. British mapping in 1963.

== Maps ==
- British Antarctic Territory: South Orkney Islands. Scale 1:100000 topographic map. DOS Series 510. Surrey, England: Directorate of Overseas Surveys, 1963
- Antarctic Digital Database (ADD). Scale 1:250000 topographic map of Antarctica. Scientific Committee on Antarctic Research (SCAR). Since 1993, regularly upgraded and updated
