= Ralitsa Glacier =

Glacier in Palmer Archipelago, Antarctica

- Location of Brabant Island in the Antarctic Peninsula region

- Location within Antarctica
- Location: Palmer Archipelago
- Coordinates: 64°07′10″S 62°29′20″W
- Length: 3 nmi (6 km; 3 mi)
- Width: 2 nmi (4 km; 2 mi)
- Thickness: unknown
- Terminus: Guyou Bay
- Status: unknown

Ralitsa Glacier (Bulgarian: ледник Ралица, romanized: lednik Ralitsa, IPA: [ˈlɛdnik ˈralit͡sɐ]) is the 5.5 km long and 3.5 km wide glacier on Brabant Island in the Palmer Archipelago, Antarctica, situated south of Oshane Glacier, southwest of Lister Glacier, northwest of the head of Paré Glacier and north of Palilula Glacier. It drains the northwest slopes of Mount Rokitansky in Stribog Mountains, and flows northwestwards into Guyou Bay.

The glacier is named after the settlements of Ralitsa in Northeastern and Southern Bulgaria.

== Location ==
Ralitsa Glacier is centred at 64°07′10″S 62°29′20″W. British mapping in 1980 and 2008.

== See also ==
- List of glaciers in the Antarctic
- Glaciology

== Maps ==
- Antarctic Digital Database (ADD). Scale 1:250000 topographic map of Antarctica. Scientific Committee on Antarctic Research (SCAR). Since 1993, regularly upgraded and updated.
- British Antarctic Territory. Scale 1:200000 topographic map. DOS 610 Series, Sheet W 64 62. Directorate of Overseas Surveys, Tolworth, UK, 1980.
- Brabant Island to Argentine Islands. Scale 1:250000 topographic map. British Antarctic Survey, 2008.
