= Röntgen Peak =

Mountain in Antarctica

Röntgen Peak (64°2′S 62°17′W) is a peak 1 nautical mile (1.9 km) southeast of Cape Cockburn in the northeast part of Pasteur Peninsula, Brabant Island, in the Palmer Archipelago. Shown on an Argentine government chart in 1953, but not named. Photographed by Hunting Aerosurveys Ltd. in 1956–57, and mapped from these photos in 1959. Named by the United Kingdom Antarctic Place-Names Committee (UK-APC) for Wilhelm Röntgen (1845–1923), German physicist who discovered X-rays in 1895.

== Maps ==
- Antarctic Digital Database (ADD). Scale 1:250000 topographic map of Antarctica. Scientific Committee on Antarctic Research (SCAR). Since 1993, regularly upgraded and updated.
- British Antarctic Territory. Scale 1:200000 topographic map. DOS 610 Series, Sheet W 64 62. Directorate of Overseas Surveys, Tolworth, UK, 1980.
- Brabant Island to Argentine Islands. Scale 1:250000 topographic map. British Antarctic Survey, 2008.
