= Podayva Glacier =

Glacier in Palmer Archipelago, Antarctica

- Location of Brabant Island in the Antarctic Peninsula region

- Location within Antarctica
- Location: Palmer Archipelago
- Coordinates: 64°02′25″S 62°25′30″W
- Length: 2.5 nmi (5 km; 3 mi)
- Width: 1.6 nmi (3 km; 2 mi)
- Thickness: unknown
- Terminus: Cape Roux
- Status: unknown

Podayva Glacier (Bulgarian: ледник Подайва, romanized: lednik Podayva, IPA: [ˈlɛdnik poˈdajvɐ]) is the 4.5 km long and 3 km wide glacier on Pasteur Peninsula, Brabant Island in the Palmer Archipelago, Antarctica, situated northeast of Dodelen Glacier and west of Burevestnik Glacier. It drains the north slopes of Stribog Mountains, flows northwards and enters the sea east of Cape Roux and west of Marinka Point.

The glacier is named after the settlement of Podayva in Northeastern Bulgaria.

== Location ==
Podayva Glacier is centred at 64°02′25″S 62°25′30″W. British mapping in 1980 and 2008.

== See also ==
- List of glaciers in the Antarctic
- Glaciology

== Maps ==
- Antarctic Digital Database (ADD). Scale 1:250000 topographic map of Antarctica. Scientific Committee on Antarctic Research (SCAR). Since 1993, regularly upgraded and updated.
- British Antarctic Territory. Scale 1:200000 topographic map. DOS 610 Series, Sheet W 64 62. Directorate of Overseas Surveys, Tolworth, UK, 1980.
- Brabant Island to Argentine Islands. Scale 1:250000 topographic map. British Antarctic Survey, 2008.
