= Ralitsa =

Ralitsa (also written Ralitza, Ralica; or Ралица in Cyrillic) may refer to:

== People ==
- Ralitsa Vassileva, Bulgarian journalist

== Places ==
- In Bulgaria:
  - Ralitsa, Kardzhali Province - a village in Momchilgrad municipality, Kardzhali Province
  - Ralitsa, Targovishte Province - a village in Targovishte municipality, Targovishte Province
