= Spanish Point =

Spanish Point may refer to:

- Spanish Point (Antarctica), on Bulgarian Beach on Hurd Peninsula, Antarctica
- Spanish Point (Barbuda), one of the two southernmost points on the Caribbean island of Barbuda
- Spanish Point, Bermuda, prominent headland in Bermuda
- Spanish Point, County Clare, village in County Clare, Ireland
- Historic Spanish Point, museum and environmental complex located in Osprey, Florida, United States
