= Amphibolite Point =

Location in the South Orkney Islands

Amphibolite Point (60°41′S 45°21′W) is a conspicuous, pyramidal point 1.5 nautical miles (3 km) northwest of Saunders Point on the south coast of Coronation Island, in the South Orkney Islands. It was named by the Falkland Islands Dependencies Survey following their survey of 1948–49; there is a large amount of amphibolite on this point.

Avalanche Corrie is an ice-filled cirque, or corrie, close north of Amphibolite Point. It was so named by the Falkland Islands Dependencies Survey, because of the continuous avalanches from the hanging glaciers above the corrie.
