= Oshane Glacier =

Glacier in Antarctica

- Location of Brabant Island in the Antarctic Peninsula region

- Location within Antarctica
- Location: Palmer Archipelago
- Coordinates: 64°05′30″S 62°28′00″W
- Length: 2 nmi (4 km; 2 mi)
- Width: 1 nmi (2 km; 1 mi)
- Thickness: unknown
- Terminus: Guyou Bay
- Status: unknown

Oshane Glacier (Bulgarian: ледник Ошане, romanized: lednik Oshane, IPA: [ˈlɛdnik oˈʃanɛ]) is the 3 km long and 2.5 km wide glacier on Brabant Island in the Palmer Archipelago, Antarctica, situated south of Dodelen Glacier, west of Lister Glacier and north of Ralitsa Glacier. It drains the west slopes of Cushing Peak in Stribog Mountains, and flows westwards into Guyou Bay.

The glacier is named after the settlement of Oshane in Northwestern Bulgaria.

== Location ==
Oshane Glacier is centred at 64°05′30″S 62°28′00″W. British mapping in 1980 and 2008.

== See also ==
- List of glaciers in the Antarctic
- Glaciology

== Maps ==
- Antarctic Digital Database (ADD). Scale 1:250000 topographic map of Antarctica. Scientific Committee on Antarctic Research (SCAR). Since 1993, regularly upgraded and updated.
- British Antarctic Territory. Scale 1:200000 topographic map. DOS 610 Series, Sheet W 64 62. Directorate of Overseas Surveys, Tolworth, UK, 1980.
- Brabant Island to Argentine Islands. Scale 1:250000 topographic map. British Antarctic Survey, 2008.
