= Smolensk Strait =

Strait in Antarctica

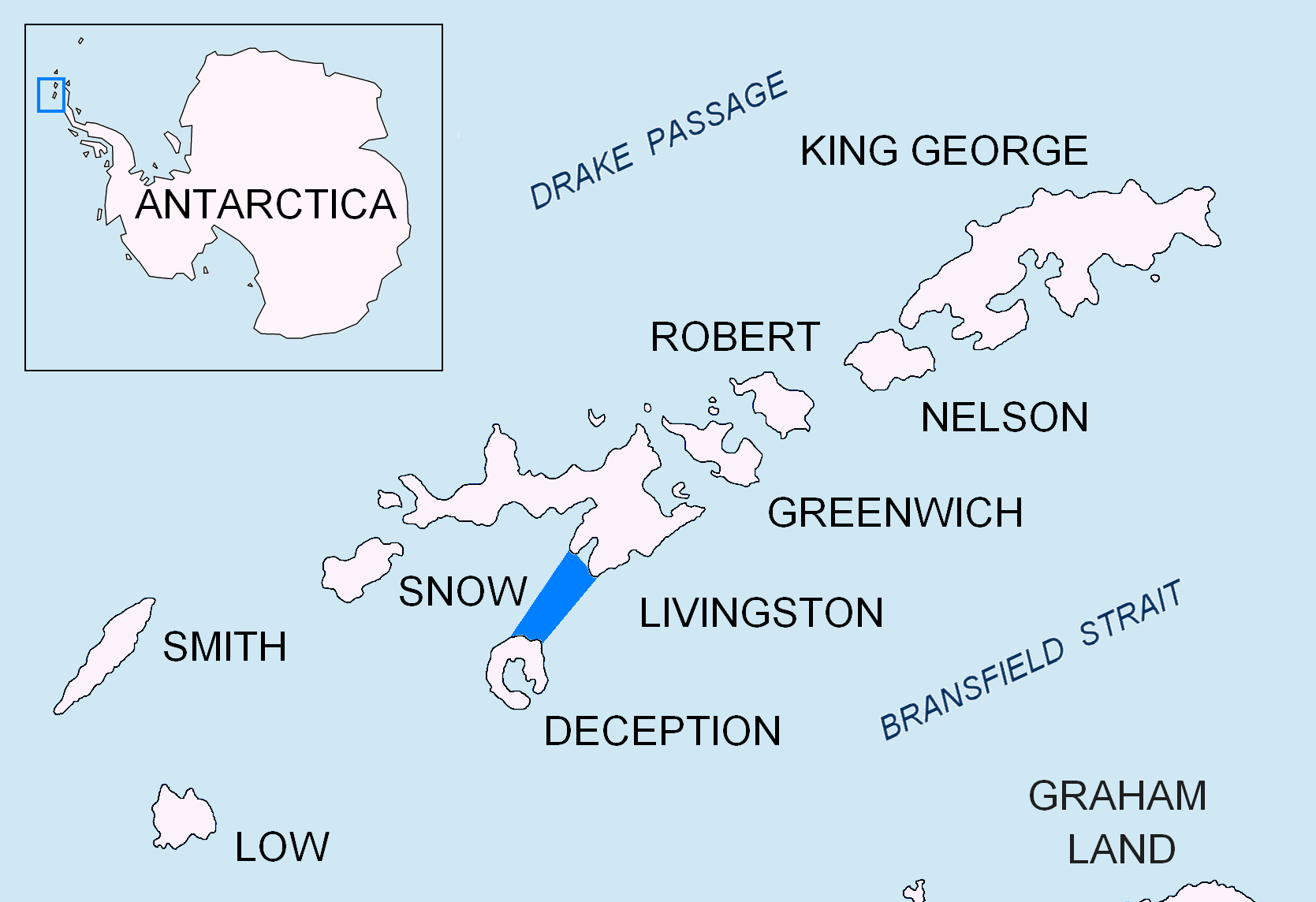
Location of Smolensk Strait in the South Shetland Islands.

Topographic map of Livingston Island and Smith Island.

Smolensk Strait (Bulgarian: проток Смоленск, Protok Smolensk \'pro-tok smo-'lensk\) is the strait in the South Shetland Islands, Antarctica separating Deception Island from Rozhen Peninsula on Livingston Island, 18.4 km wide between Macaroni Point to the southwest and Barnard Point to the northeast.

The feature is so named in order to preserve the historical memory of the area. While sailing through this strait on 6 February 1821, the Russian explorer Thaddeus von Bellingshausen met with the American sealer Nathaniel Palmer, made a description of Livingston Island and named it Smolensk after the Battle of Smolensk, one of the great battles of the Napoleonic Wars.

== Location ==
Smolensk Strait is centred at 62°49′45″S 60°26′00″W. British mapping in 1968 and Spanish in 1991.

== Maps ==
- Islas Livingston y Decepción. Mapa topográfico a escala 1:100000. Madrid: Servicio Geográfico del Ejército, 1991.
- Antarctic Digital Database (ADD). Scale 1:250000 topographic map of Antarctica. Scientific Committee on Antarctic Research (SCAR). Since 1993, regularly upgraded and updated.
