= William J. L. Sladen =

Welsh American naturalist (1920–2017)

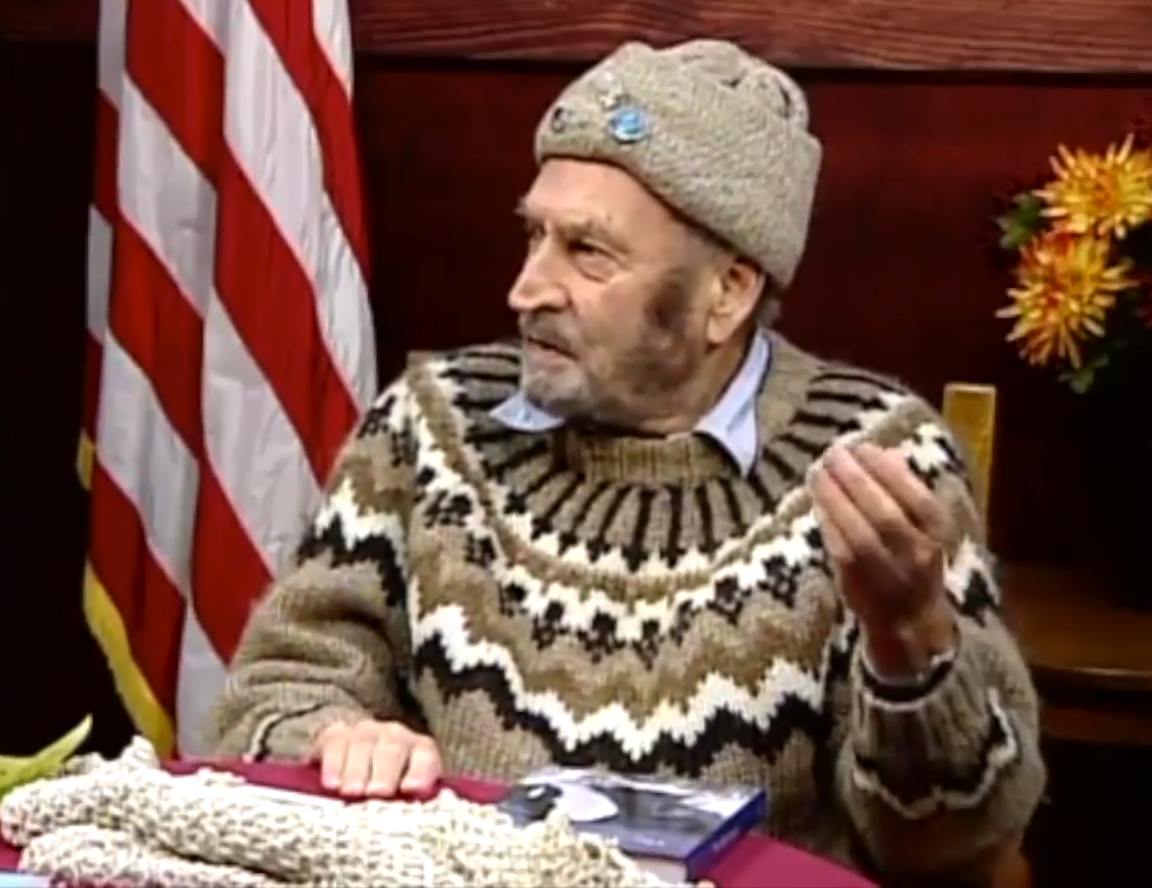
William J. L. Sladen

William Joseph Lambart Sladen MBE (19 December 1920 – 29 May 2017) was a Welsh American naturalist who was an Antarctic explorer and a specialist on polar bird life. He was professor emeritus at Johns Hopkins University in the United States. He researched the mating of Antarctic birds and received the Polar Medal. Two mountains on the continent, Mount Sladen and Sladen Summit, are named in his honour. His discovery in the 1960s that DDT residues could be found in adelie penguins contributed to the banning of DDT in the U.S.

Sladen was born in Wales and trained in medicine with an MD from London and a Ph.D. in zoology from Oxford and joined a research team to the Antarctic in 1948 as part of the Falkland Islands Dependencies Survey. The expedition required him to live alone and sledge with dogs after his colleagues were killed in a fire. He moved to the United States in 1956 and taught behaviour and ecology at the Johns Hopkins University School of Public Health. He worked with the US Antarctic Research Program and undertook studies on diseases in wild birds. He detected DDT traces in Antarctic penguins in 1964 and influenced the EPA's ban on the pesticide. Sladen worked on Wrangel Island in cooperation with Soviet scientists. In the 1970s he studied Tundra swans and advised the US airforce. A film on his studies Penguin City was produced in 1971 with narration by Charles Kuralt and broadcast by CBS. In the 1980s he worked with Bill Lishman to train Canada geese to follow ultralight aircraft. This would later inspire the movie Fly Away Home (1996). He retired to Fauquier County in 1990 where he worked as the director of the Clifton Institute, a research station north of Warrenton Virginia. He was survived by his second wife, the former Jocelyn Arundel, as well as his first wife, Brenda Macpherson Sladen, and his two children, Kate Adélie Sladen and Hugh Sladen, as well as two grandchildren.

Sladen's maternal great-grandparents founded the Salvation Army, and thus his parents, Hugh Alfred Lambart Sladen and Catherine Motee Booth-Tucker, and other family members served as officers in the organisation. His maternal grand-parents were Frederick Booth-Tucker and Emma Booth-Tucker, both influential figures in the organisation, although Sladen was not involved in its activities.
