= Marinka Point =

Cape in Palmer Archipelago, Antarctica

Location of Brabant Island in the Antarctic Peninsula region.

Marinka Point (Bulgarian: нос Маринка, ‘Nos Marinka’ \'nos ma-'rin-ka\) is the narrow rocky point projecting 400 m from the north coast of Pasteur Peninsula and forming the north extremity of Brabant Island in the Palmer Archipelago, Antarctica.

The point is named after the settlement of Marinka in Southeastern Bulgaria.

== Location ==
Marinka Point is located at 64°00′27″S 62°23′23″W, which is 4.5 km east by north of Cape Roux and 4.3 km west by north of Cape Cockburn. British mapping was carried out in 1980 and 2008.

== Maps ==
- Antarctic Digital Database (ADD). Scale 1:250000 topographic map of Antarctica. Scientific Committee on Antarctic Research (SCAR). Since 1993, regularly upgraded and updated.
- British Antarctic Territory. Scale 1:200000 topographic map. DOS 610 Series, Sheet W 64 62. Directorate of Overseas Surveys, Tolworth, UK, 1980.
- Brabant Island to Argentine Islands. Scale 1:250000 topographic map. British Antarctic Survey, 2008.
