= Marynka =

Marynka may refer to

- Marynka, Podlaskie Voivodeship, a village in Poland
- Marynka, Greater Poland Voivodeship, a settlement in Poland
- Saint Mary Magdalene High School in Poznań, known colloquially as Marynka

== See also ==
- Marinka (disambiguation)
