= Bulgarian Beach =

Beach in Antarctica

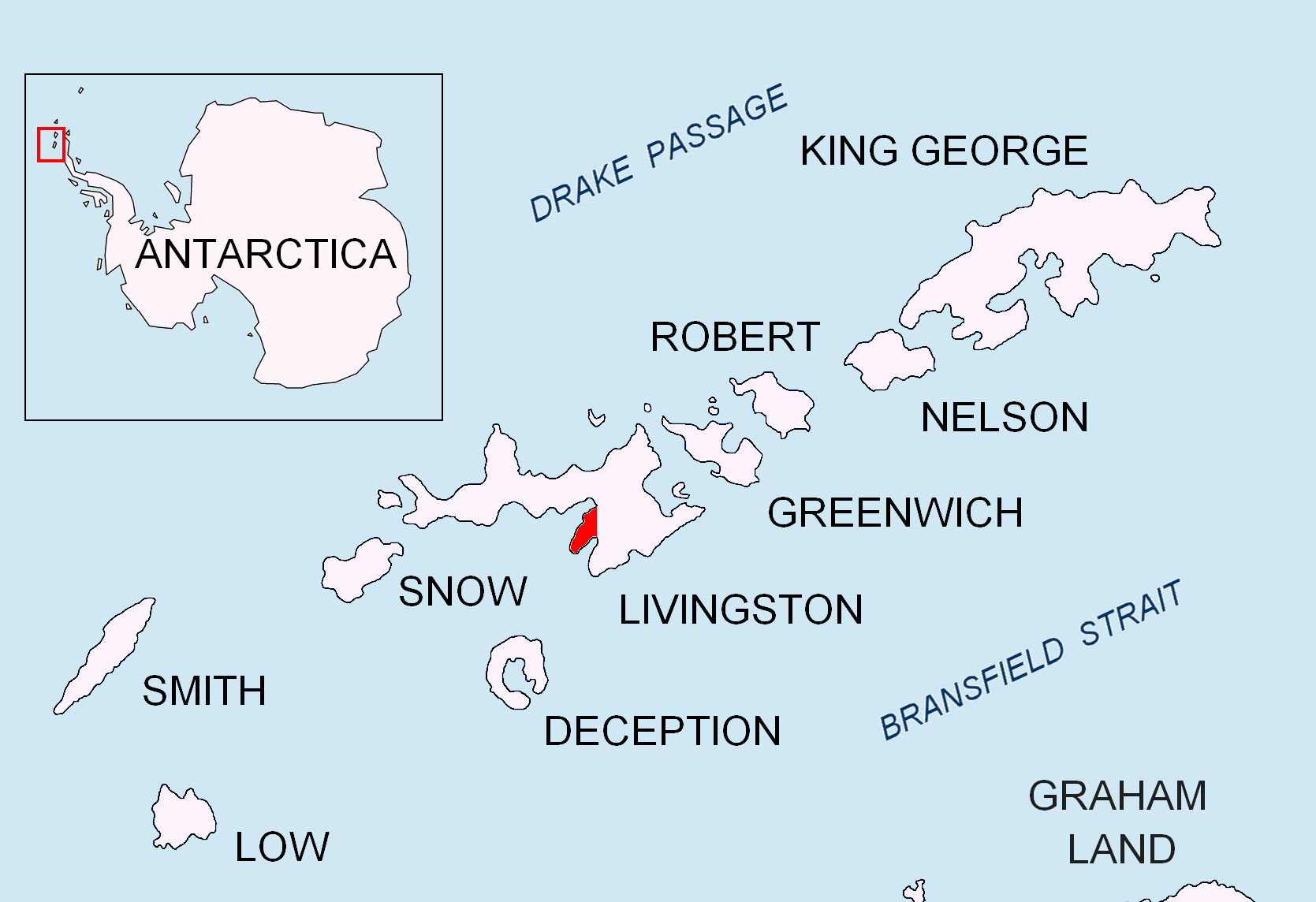
Location of Hurd Peninsula in the South Shetland Islands.

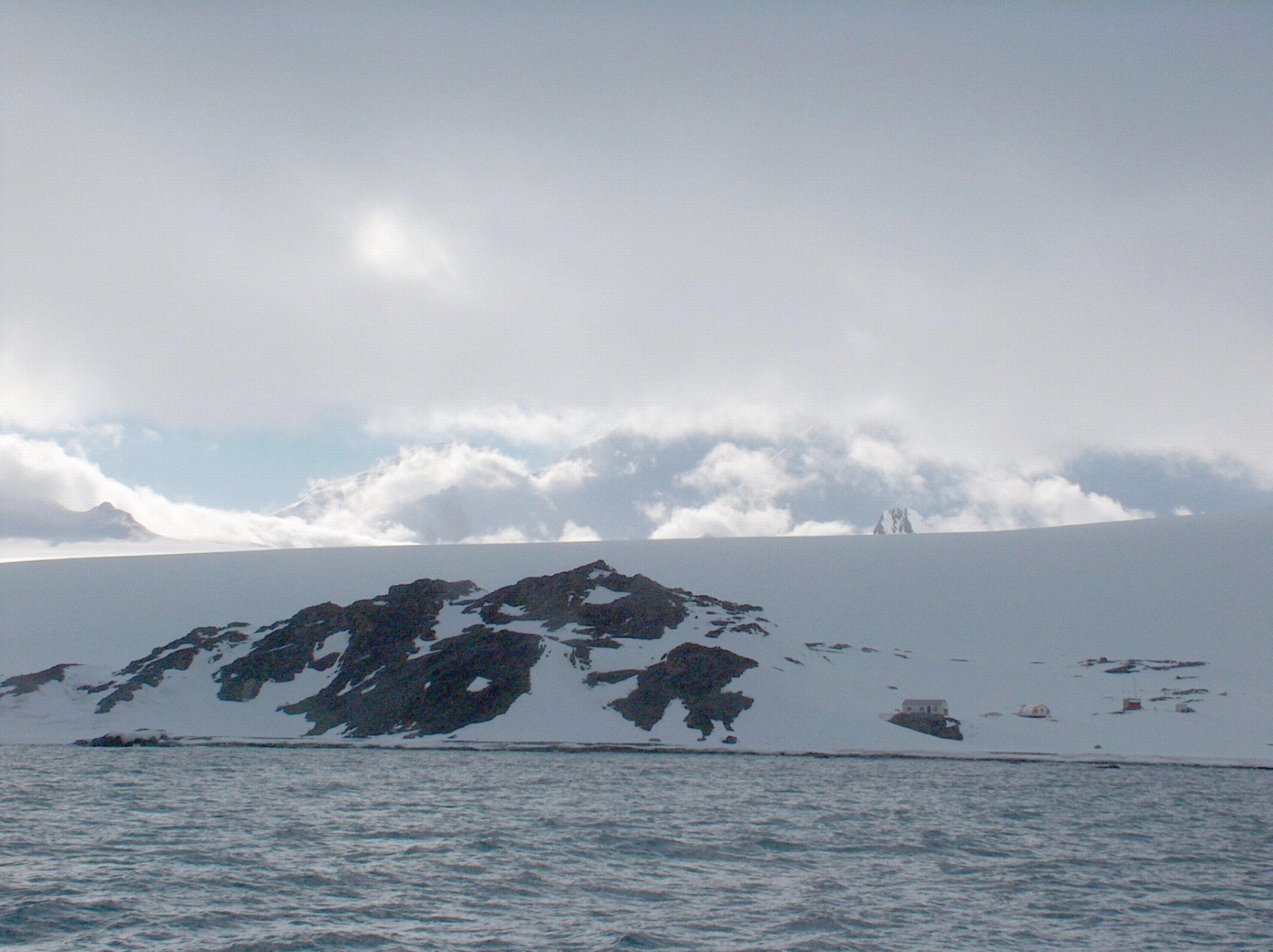
Sinemorets Hill and St. Kliment Ohridski Base on Bulgarian Beach.

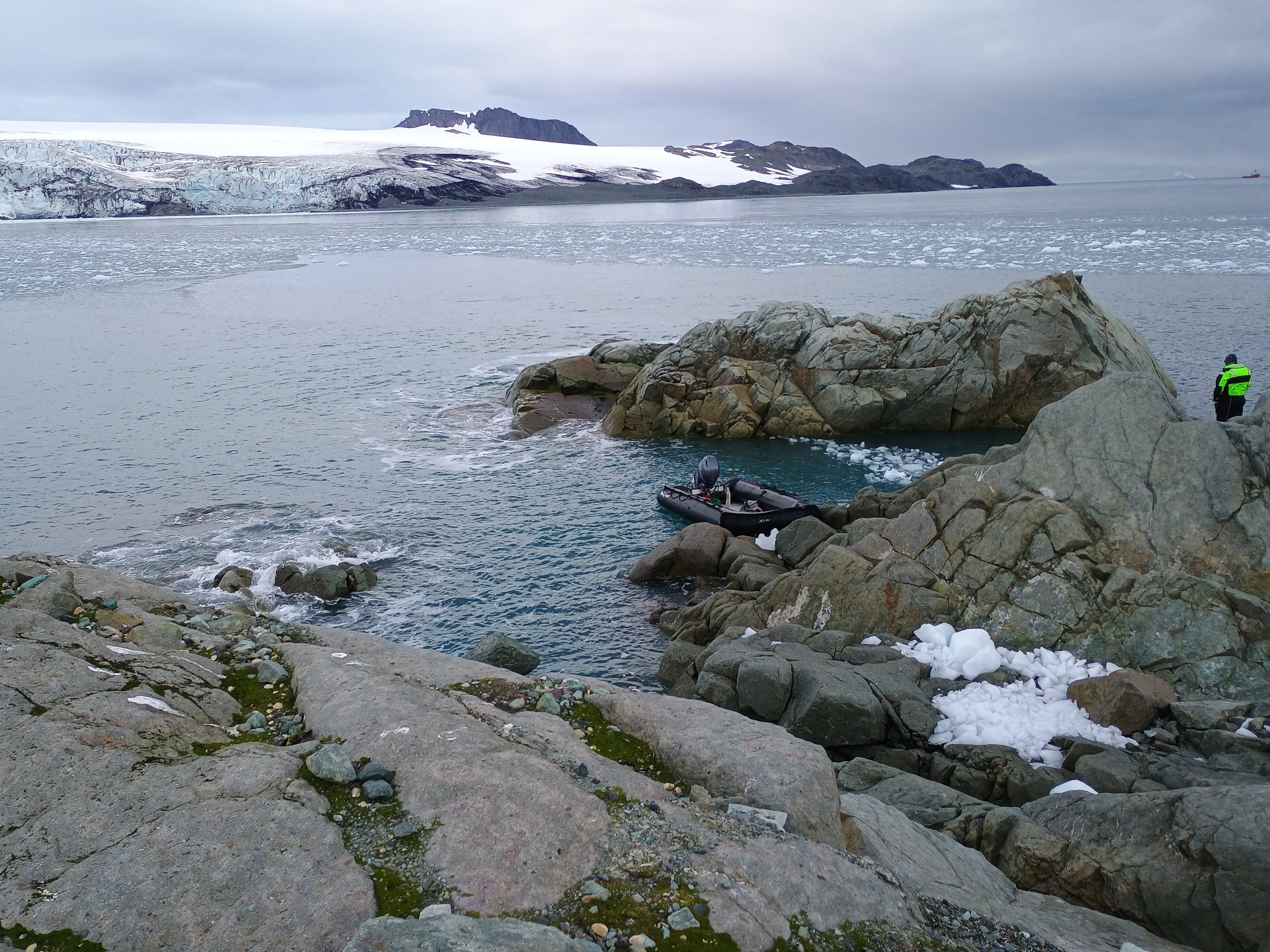
Bulgarian Beach and Emona Anchorage from Aleko Point.

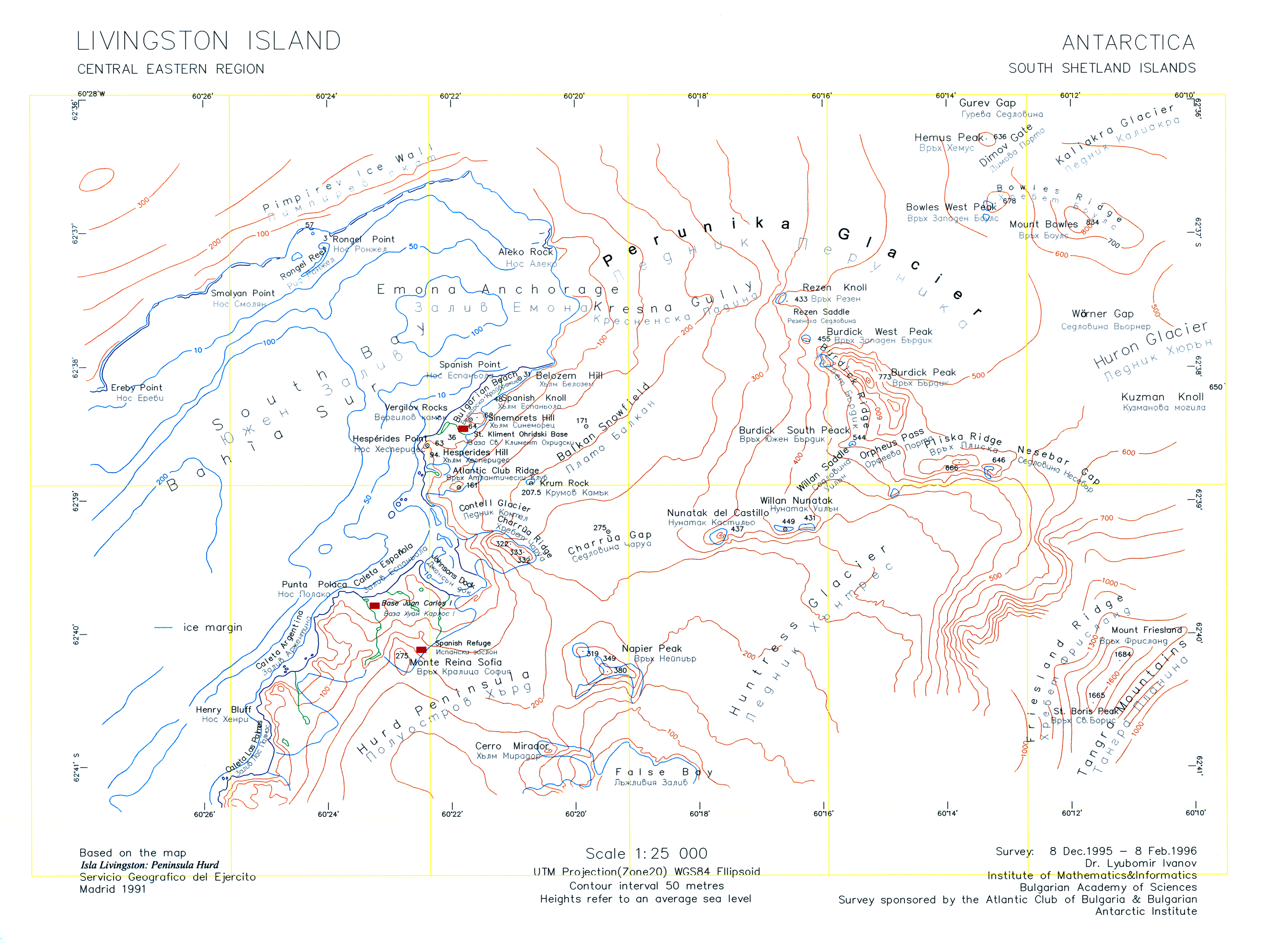
Topographic map of central-eastern Livingston Island featuring Bulgarian Beach.

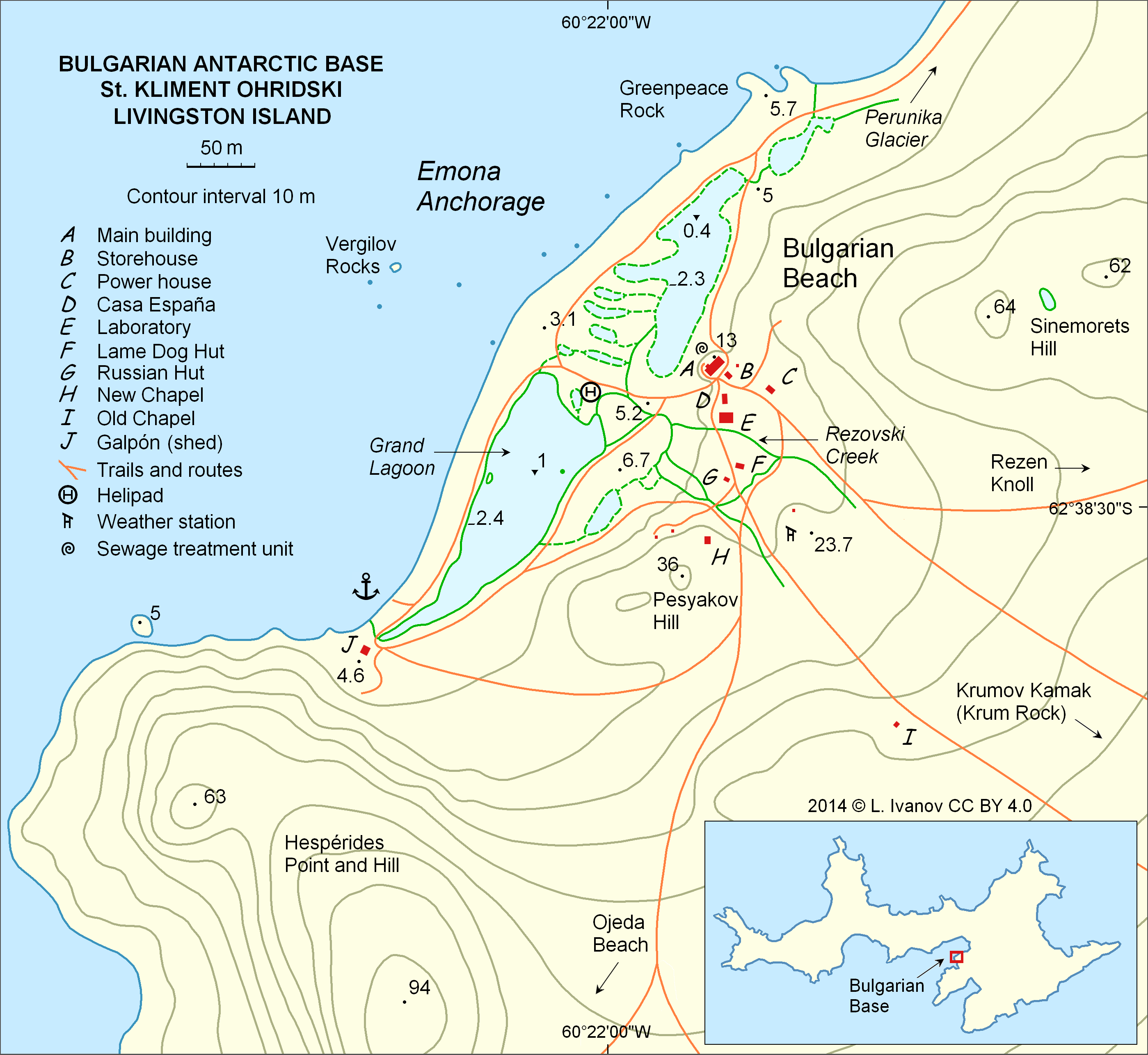
Topographic map of the southwestern part of Bulgarian Beach with St. Kliment Ohridski base.

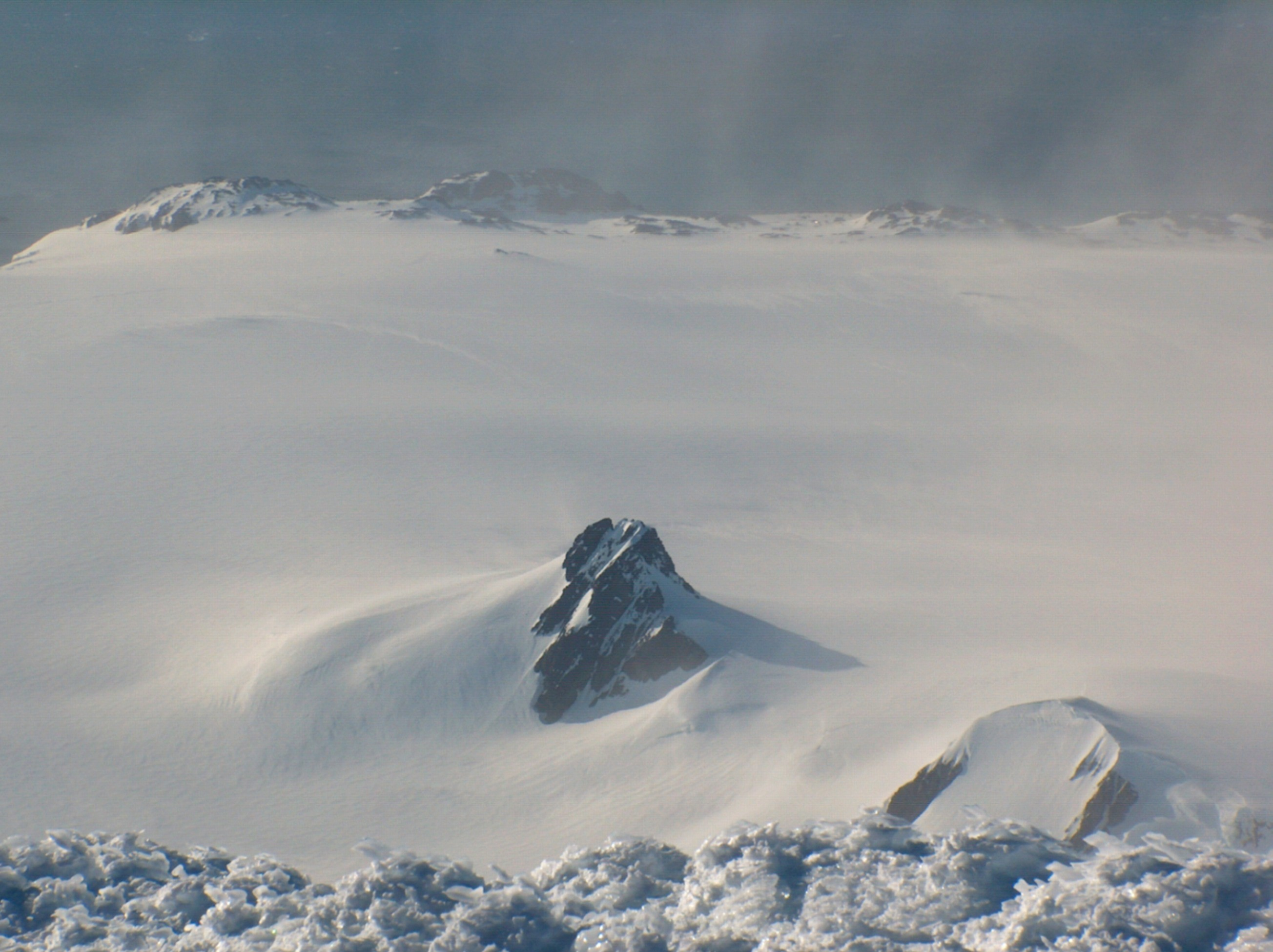
Bulgarian Beach and Balkan Snowfield from the summit Mount Friesland, with Castillo Nunatak in the foreground.

Topographic map of Livingston Island and Smith Island.

Bulgarian Beach (Balgarsko Kraybrezhie \'b&l-gar-sko krI-'bre-zhi-e\) is a coast in the north part of Hurd Peninsula, eastern Livingston Island, extending 2.3 kilometres (1.4 mi) from Hespérides Point to the southwest to Perunika Glacier to the northeast, and forming the southeast coast of Emona Anchorage.

The beach comprises four predominantly cobble beaches, separated by a shore rock known locally as Greenpeace Rock, which rises to 6 metres (20 ft) and is located 800 metres (2,600 ft) northeast of Hespérides Point, by Spanish Point and by a minor nameless point lying 400 metres (1,300 ft) to east by northeast of the latter. The last beach is a narrow strip under the cliff of a part of Perunika Glacier terminating on the coast. Bulgarian Beach is surmounted by a chain of five hills comprising Hesperides Hill, Pesyakov Hill, Sinemorets Hill, Spanish Knoll and Belozem Hill. In summer the area is predominantly snow-free and crossed by four meltwater streams draining the north-western slope of the Balkan Snowfield, with stream mouths located at the western extremities of each beach. The first beach, locally known as Base Beach, is partly occupied by Grand Lagoon formed by Rezovski Creek. Access by dinghies to Base Beach, used for transfer of people and cargo to the Bulgarian base St. Kliment Ohridski, is sometimes rendered difficult by shallow waters.

The area would have been known and possibly visited in the early nineteenth century by English and American sealers frequenting South Bay and particularly the nearby Johnsons Dock.

== Location ==
The beach is centred at 62°38′12″S 60°21′36″W. Bulgarian Beach was mapped in detail by the Spanish Servicio Geográfico del Ejército in 1991 following earlier British, Argentine and Chilean mappings. Bulgarian mapping of Bulgarian Beach and the Emona Anchorage coast from a topographic survey carried out from 8 December 1995 to 8 February 1996, and mapping of the St. Kliment Ohridski Base vicinity at a larger scale from a topographic survey made from January 31 to February 4, 1996.

== Vergilov Rocks ==
The Vergilov Rocks (Vergilov Kamak ver-'gi-lov 'ka-m&k) are a group of rocks off Bulgarian Beach on Hurd Peninsula. They are named after Zlatil Vergilov, a member of the 1988 Bulgarian party on Livingston Island, base commander at St. Kliment Ohridski in the 1996–99 seasons.

The rocks are located in eastern Livingston Island in the South Shetland Islands, Antarctica. They consist of one main rock and two adjacent smaller ones submerging at high water. They are found at 62°38′24″S 60°22′12″W which is 510 m (560 yd) northeast of Hespérides Point, 310 m (340 yd) west by south of Greenpeace Rock, and 100 m (110 yd) from the coast in front of the Bulgarian base (British mapping in 1968, Bulgarian mapping from a 1995-1996 topographic survey).

== Maps ==
- Isla Livingston: Península Hurd. Mapa topográfico de escala 1:25000. Madrid: Servicio Geográfico del Ejército, 1991. (Map reproduced on p. 16 of the linked work)
- L.L. Ivanov. Livingston Island: Central-Eastern Region. Scale 1:25000 topographic map. Sofia: Antarctic Place-names Commission of Bulgaria, 1996.
- L.L. Ivanov et al. Antarctica: Livingston Island and Greenwich Island, South Shetland Islands. Scale 1:100000 topographic map. Sofia: Antarctic Place-names Commission of Bulgaria, 2005.
- L.L. Ivanov. Antarctica: Livingston Island and Greenwich, Robert, Snow and Smith Islands. Scale 1:120000 topographic map. Troyan: Manfred Wörner Foundation, 2009. ISBN 978-954-92032-6-4
- Antarctic Digital Database (ADD). Scale 1:250000 topographic map of Antarctica. Scientific Committee on Antarctic Research (SCAR). Since 1993, regularly upgraded and updated.
- Antarctica, South Shetland Islands, Livingston Island: Bulgarian Antarctic Base. Sheets 1 and 2. Scale 1:2000 topographic map. Geodesy, Cartography and Cadastre Agency, 2016. (in Bulgarian)
- L.L. Ivanov. Antarctica: Livingston Island and Smith Island. Scale 1:100000 topographic map. Manfred Wörner Foundation, 2017. ISBN 978-619-90008-3-0

== See also ==
- Composite Antarctic Gazetteer
- List of Antarctic islands south of 60° S
- SCAR
- Territorial claims in Antarctica
- Trifonova Point
- Vergilov Ridge
