= Spanish Knoll =

Knoll in the South Shetland Islands, Antarctica

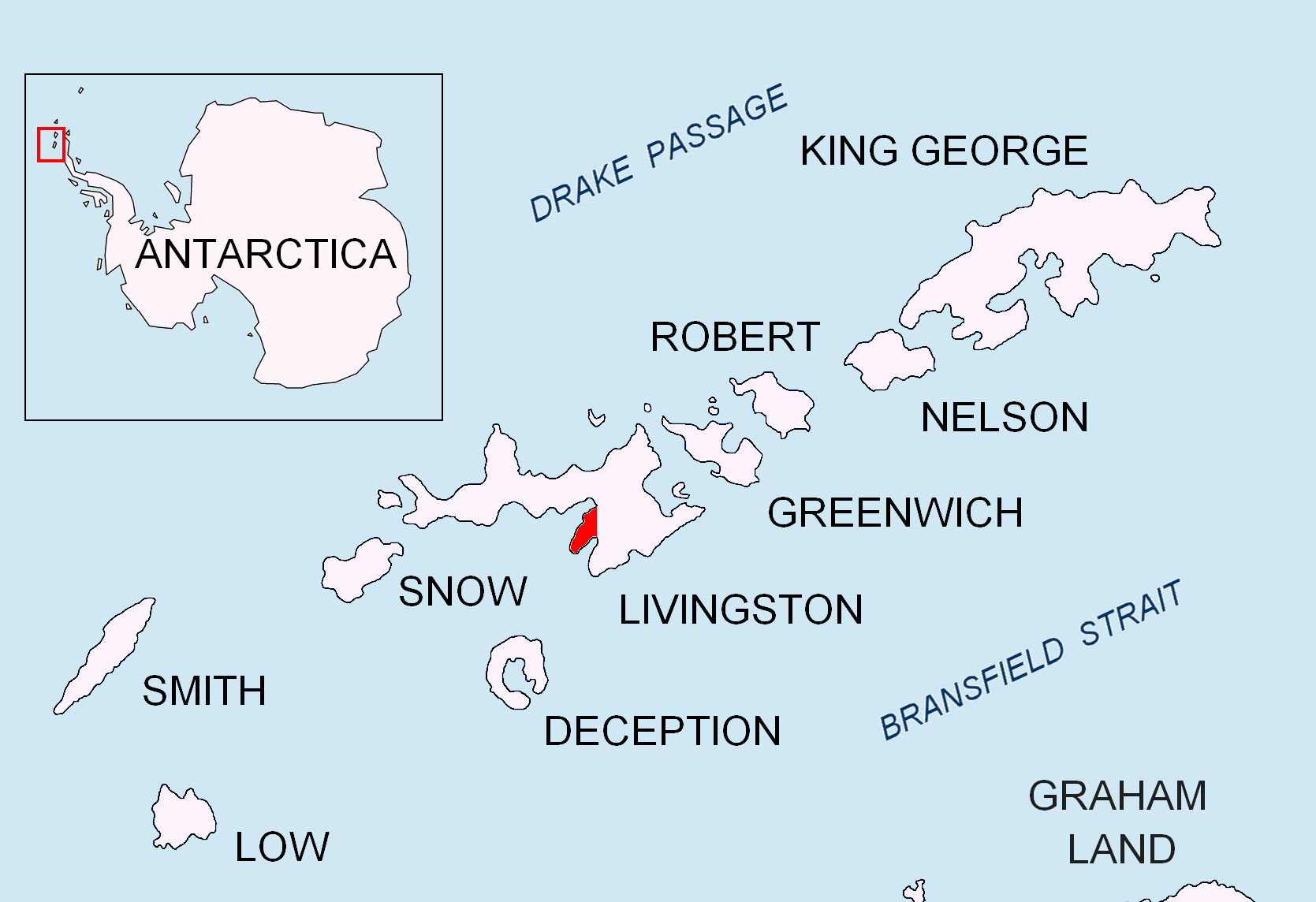
Location of Hurd Peninsula on Livingston Island in the South Shetland Islands.

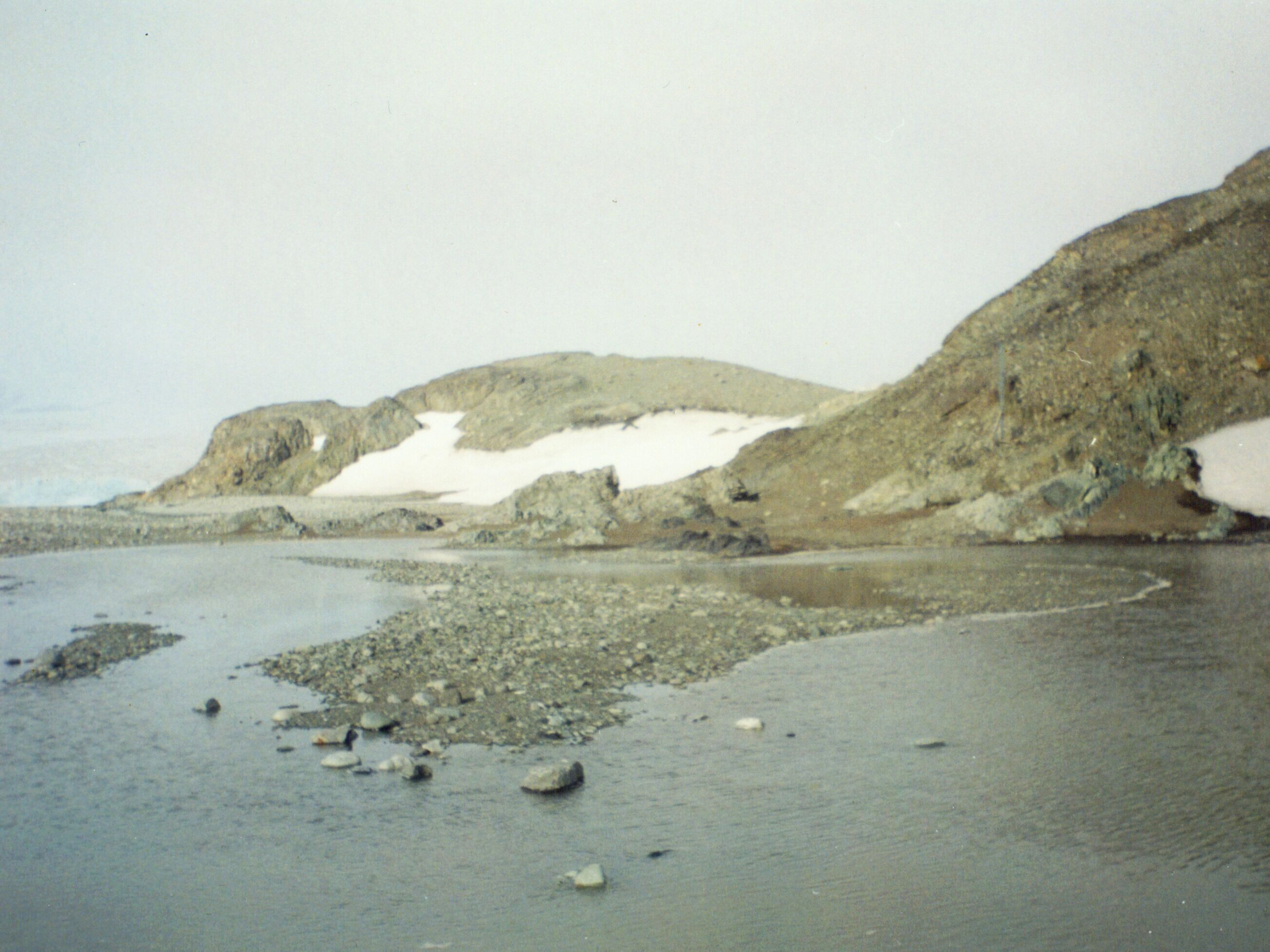
Spanish Knoll, with Sinemorets Hill on the right in the foreground.

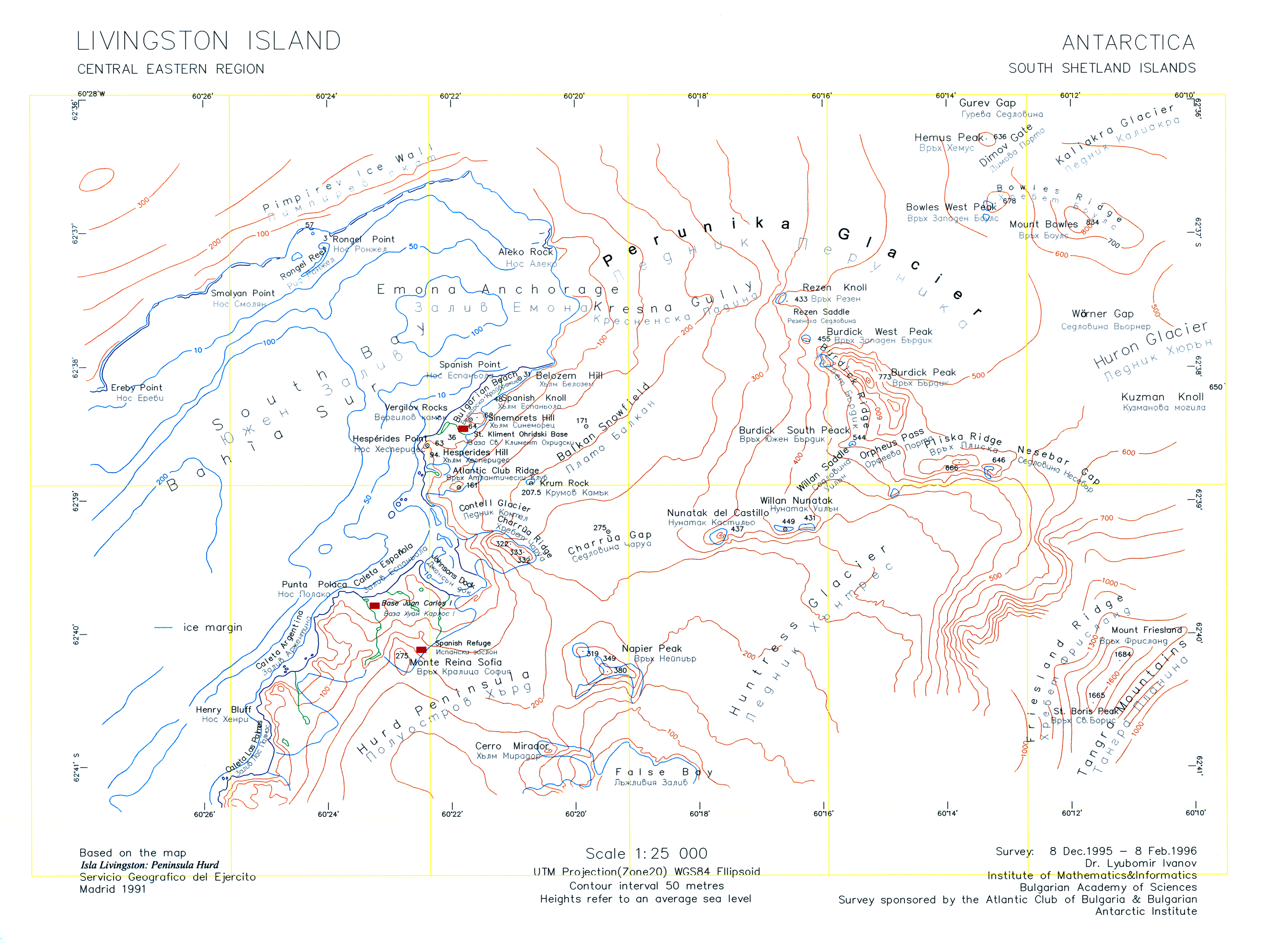
Topographic map of central-eastern Livingston Island featuring Spanish Knoll.

Topographic map of Livingston Island and Smith Island

Spanish Knoll (Halm Española \'h&lm e-spa-'nyo-la\) has a highest point of elevation 48 m located on Bulgarian Beach on Hurd Peninsula, eastern Livingston Island in the South Shetland Islands, Antarctica.

The feature takes its name from the adjacent Spanish Point which is formed by an offshoot of the hill.

== Location ==
The knoll is located at 62°38′16″S 60°21′24″W, which is 370 m northeast of Sinemorets Hill, 290 m south by west of Spanish Point formed by an offshoot of the hill, and 520 m west-southwest of Belozem Hill (Mapped in detail by the Spanish Servicio Geográfico del Ejército in 1991. Co-ordinates, elevation and distances given according to a 1995-96 Bulgarian topographic survey).

== Maps ==
- South Shetland Islands. Scale 1:200000 topographic map. DOS 610 Sheet W 62 60. Tolworth, UK, 1968.
- Islas Livingston y Decepción. Mapa topográfico a escala 1:100000. Madrid: Servicio Geográfico del Ejército, 1991.
- Isla Livingston: Península Hurd. Mapa topográfico de escala 1:25000. Madrid: Servicio Geográfico del Ejército, 1991.
- L.L. Ivanov. Livingston Island: Central-Eastern Region. Scale 1:25000 topographic map. Sofia: Antarctic Place-names Commission of Bulgaria, 1996.
- L.L. Ivanov et al., Antarctica: Livingston Island and Greenwich Island, South Shetland Islands (from English Strait to Morton Strait, with illustrations and ice-cover distribution), 1:100000 scale topographic map, Antarctic Place-names Commission of Bulgaria, Sofia, 2005
- L.L. Ivanov. Antarctica: Livingston Island and Greenwich, Robert, Snow and Smith Islands. Scale 1:120000 topographic map. Troyan: Manfred Wörner Foundation, 2010. ISBN 978-954-92032-9-5 (First edition 2009. ISBN 978-954-92032-6-4)
- Antarctic Digital Database (ADD). Scale 1:250000 topographic map of Antarctica. Scientific Committee on Antarctic Research (SCAR). Since 1993, regularly upgraded and updated.
- Bulgarian Base (Sheet 1 and Sheet 2): Antarctica, South Shetland Islands, Livingston Island. Scale 1:2000 topographic map. Sofia: Military Geographic Service, 2016. (in Bulgarian, map images on slides 6 and 7 of the linked report)
