= Duclaux Point =

- Location within Antarctic Peninsula

Highest point
- Coordinates: 64°4′S 62°15′W

Geography
- Location: Brabant Island, Palmer Archipelago

Duclaux Point is a point extending into Bouquet Bay from the east side of Pasteur Peninsula, 3 nautical miles (6 km) southeast of Cape Cockburn on Brabant Island in the Palmer Archipelago. It was first charted by the French Antarctic Expedition, 1903–05, and named by Jean-Baptiste Charcot for Pierre E. Duclaux, a French biochemist who was director of the Pasteur Institute in Paris in 1895.
