= Vergilov Ridge =

Ridge in the South Shetland Islands

Location of Livingston Island in the South Shetland Islands.

Topographic map of Livingston Island and Smith Island.

Vergilov Ridge (Bulgarian: Вергилов хребет, 'Vergilov Hrebet' \ver-'gi-lov 'hre-bet\) is a submarine ridge in South Bay, Livingston Island in the South Shetland Islands, Antarctica. It extends 3.5 km in a southeast–northwest direction between the Vergilov Rocks and the opposite Pimpirev Beach at a depth of over 50 m, with depths exceeding 100 m on both sides of the ridge. It was formed as a frontal moraine of Perunika Glacier between the 13th and 17th centuries.

The feature takes its name from the Vergilov Rocks.

== Location ==
Vergilov Ridge is centred at 62°37′48″S 60°23′35″W. Spanish mapping in 1991.

== See also ==
- Vergilov Rocks

== Maps ==
- Isla Livingston: Península Hurd. Mapa topográfico de escala 1:25000. Madrid: Servicio Geográfico del Ejército, 1991. (Map reproduced on p. 16 of the linked work)
- L.L. Ivanov. Antarctica: Livingston Island and Greenwich, Robert, Snow and Smith Islands. Scale 1:120000 topographic map. Troyan: Manfred Wörner Foundation, 2009. ISBN 978-954-92032-6-4
- Antarctica, South Shetland Islands, Livingston Island: Bulgarian Antarctic Base. Sheets 1 and 2. Scale 1:2000 topographic map. Geodesy, Cartography and Cadastre Agency, 2016. (in Bulgarian)
- Antarctic Digital Database (ADD). Scale 1:250000 topographic map of Antarctica. Scientific Committee on Antarctic Research (SCAR). Since 1993, regularly upgraded and updated.
- L.L. Ivanov. Antarctica: Livingston Island and Smith Island. Scale 1:100000 topographic map. Manfred Wörner Foundation, 2017. ISBN 978-619-90008-3-0
