= Skrino Rocks =

Rocks in the South Shetland Islands, Antarctica

- Location of Robert Island in the South Shetland Islands

- Location on Antarctic Peninsula Location in Antarctica

Geography
- Location: Antarctica
- Coordinates: 62°23′06.5″S 59°19′32″W
- Archipelago: South Shetland Islands

Administration
- Antarctica
- Administered under the Antarctic Treaty System

Demographics
- Population: uninhabited

Skrino Rocks (Bulgarian: скали Скрино, ‘Skali Skrino’ \ska-'li skri-'no\) is the chain of rocks off the east coast of Robert Island in the South Shetland Islands, Antarctica, extending 570 m (623 yd) in east–west direction.

The rocks are named after the settlement of Skrino in Western Bulgaria.

== Location ==
Skrino Rocks are centered at 62°23′06.5″S 59°19′32″W, which is 1.03 km (0.64 mi) west-northeast of Kitchen Point and 3.4 km (2.1 mi) south-southeast of Salient Rock. British mapping in 1968 and Bulgarian in 2009.

Topographic map of Livingston Island, Greenwich, Robert, Snow and Smith Islands

== See also ==
- Composite Antarctic Gazetteer
- List of Antarctic and sub-Antarctic islands
- List of Antarctic islands south of 60° S
- SCAR
- Territorial claims in Antarctica

== Map ==
- L.L. Ivanov. Antarctica: Livingston Island and Greenwich, Robert, Snow and Smith Islands. Scale 1:120000 topographic map. Troyan: Manfred Wörner Foundation, 2009. ISBN 978-954-92032-6-4
