= Suhache Rock =

Rock in the South Shetland Islands, Antarctica

- Location of Robert Island in the South Shetland Islands

- Location on Antarctic Peninsula Location in Antarctica

Geography
- Location: Antarctica
- Coordinates: 62°19′25.3″S 59°42′35″W
- Archipelago: South Shetland Islands

Administration
- Antarctica
- Administered under the Antarctic Treaty System

Demographics
- Population: uninhabited

Suhache Rock (Bulgarian: скала Сухаче, ‘Skala Suhache’ \ska-'la su-'ha-che\) is the rock off the northwest coast of Robert Island in the South Shetland Islands, Antarctica extending 270 m (890 ft) in east-northeast to west-southwest direction and 50 m (160 ft) wide. The area was visited by early 19th century sealers.

The rock is named after the settlement of Suhache in Northern Bulgaria.

== Location ==
Suhache Rock is located at 62°19′25.3″S 59°42′35″W, which is 420 m (1,380 ft) west of Heywood Island, 850 m (2,790 ft) north of Rogozen Island and 1.64 km (1.02 mi) east of Potmess Rocks. British mapping in 1968 and Bulgarian in 2009.

Topographic map of Livingston Island, Greenwich, Robert, Snow and Smith Islands.

== Maps ==
- Livingston Island to King George Island. Scale 1:200000. Admiralty Nautical Chart 1776. Taunton: UK Hydrographic Office, 1968.
- L.L. Ivanov. Antarctica: Livingston Island and Greenwich, Robert, Snow and Smith Islands. Scale 1:120000 topographic map. Troyan: Manfred Wörner Foundation, 2009. ISBN 978-954-92032-6-4 (Second edition 2010, ISBN 978-954-92032-9-5)
- Antarctic Digital Database (ADD). Scale 1:250000 topographic map of Antarctica. Scientific Committee on Antarctic Research (SCAR). Since 1993, regularly upgraded and updated.
