= Claude Point =

Headland in the Palmer Archipelago, Antarctica

Claude Point (64°7′S 62°36′W) is a headland which forms the south side of the entrance to Guyou Bay on the west side of Brabant Island, in the Palmer Archipelago. It was discovered by the French Antarctic Expedition, 1903–1905, under Jean-Baptiste Charcot, who named it for Monsieur Claude, an associate member of the Bureau des Longitudes.

== Maps ==
- Antarctic Digital Database (ADD). Scale 1:250000 topographic map of Antarctica. Scientific Committee on Antarctic Research (SCAR). Since 1993, regularly upgraded and updated.
- British Antarctic Territory. Scale 1:200000 topographic map. DOS 610 Series, Sheet W 64 62. Directorate of Overseas Surveys, Tolworth, UK, 1980.
- Brabant Island to Argentine Islands. Scale 1:250000 topographic map. British Antarctic Survey, 2008.
