= Marinka, Bulgaria =

Village in Burgas, Bulgaria

Marinka Маринка
- Village
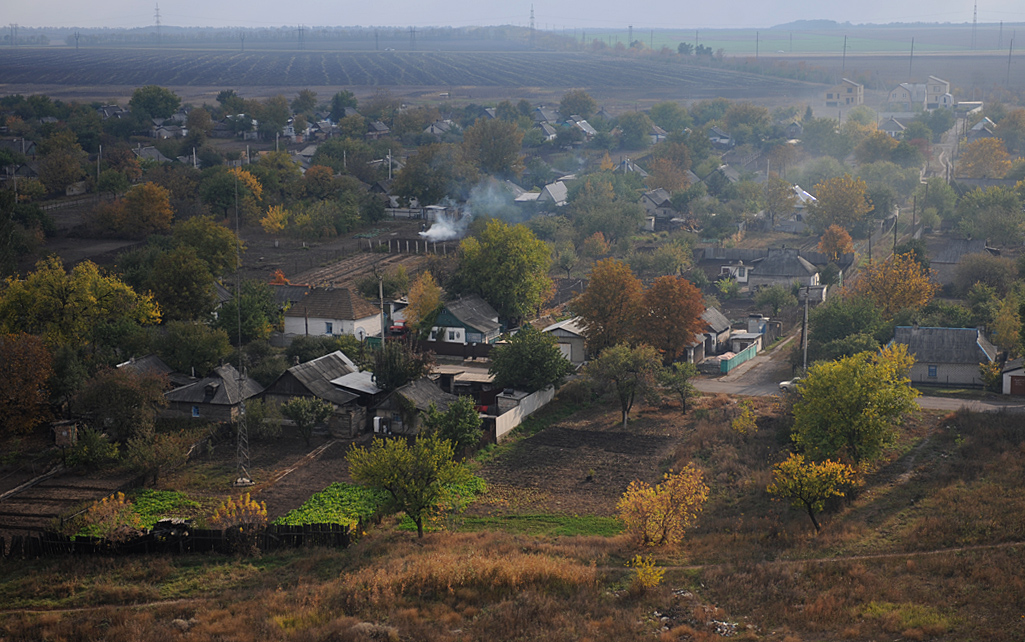

- Location within Bulgaria
- Coordinates: 42°40′15″N 27°48′21″E
- Country: Bulgaria
- Province: Burgas Province
- Municipality: Burgas Municipality

Population (2022)
  - Total: 1,262
- Time zone: UTC+2 (EET)
  - Summer (DST): UTC+3 (EEST)

Marinka (Bulgarian: Маринка) is a village in Burgas Municipality, in Burgas Province, in southeastern Bulgaria.

As of 2022, the village had 1262 people.

== Honours ==
Marinka Point on Brabant Island, Antarctica is named after the village.
