= Maryinka, Vladimir Oblast =

Maryinka Марьинка
- Village
- Location within Vladimir Oblast Location within Russia
- Coordinates: 56°11′N 40°59′E
- Country: Russia
- Region: Vladimir Oblast
- District: Kameshkovsky District
- Time zone: UTC+3:00

Maryinka (Russian: Марьинка) is a rural locality (a village) in Penkinskoye Rural Settlement, Kameshkovsky District, Vladimir Oblast, Russia. The population was 22 as of 2010.

== Geography ==
Maryinka is located 63 km south of Kameshkovo (the district's administrative centre) by road. Pirogovo is the nearest rural locality.
