= DDT-dehydrochlorinase =

Identifiers
- EC no.: 4.5.1.1
- CAS no.: 9031-20-3

Databases
- IntEnz: IntEnz view
- BRENDA: BRENDA entry
- ExPASy: NiceZyme view
- KEGG: KEGG entry
- MetaCyc: metabolic pathway
- PRIAM: profile
- PDB structures: RCSB PDB PDBe PDBsum
- Gene Ontology: AmiGO / QuickGO
Search
- PMC: articles
- PubMed: articles
- NCBI: proteins

The enzyme DDT-dehydrochlorinase (EC 4.5.1.1) catalyzes the reaction

1,1,1-trichloro-2,2-bis(4-chlorophenyl)ethane $\rightleftharpoons$ 1,1-dichloro-2,2-bis(4-chlorophenyl)ethylene + chloride

This enzyme belongs to the family of lyases, specifically the class of carbon-halide lyases. The systematic name of this enzyme class is 1,1,1-trichloro-2,2-bis(4-chlorophenyl)ethane chloride-lyase [1,1-dichloro-2,2-bis(4-chlorophenyl)ethylene-forming]. Other names in common use include DDT-ase, 1,1,1-trichloro-2,2-bis(4-chlorophenyl)ethane chloride-lyase, dehydrohalogenase, and DDTase.
