= Skaidava Bay =

Bay in Antarctica

Location of Alexander Island in the Antarctic Peninsula region

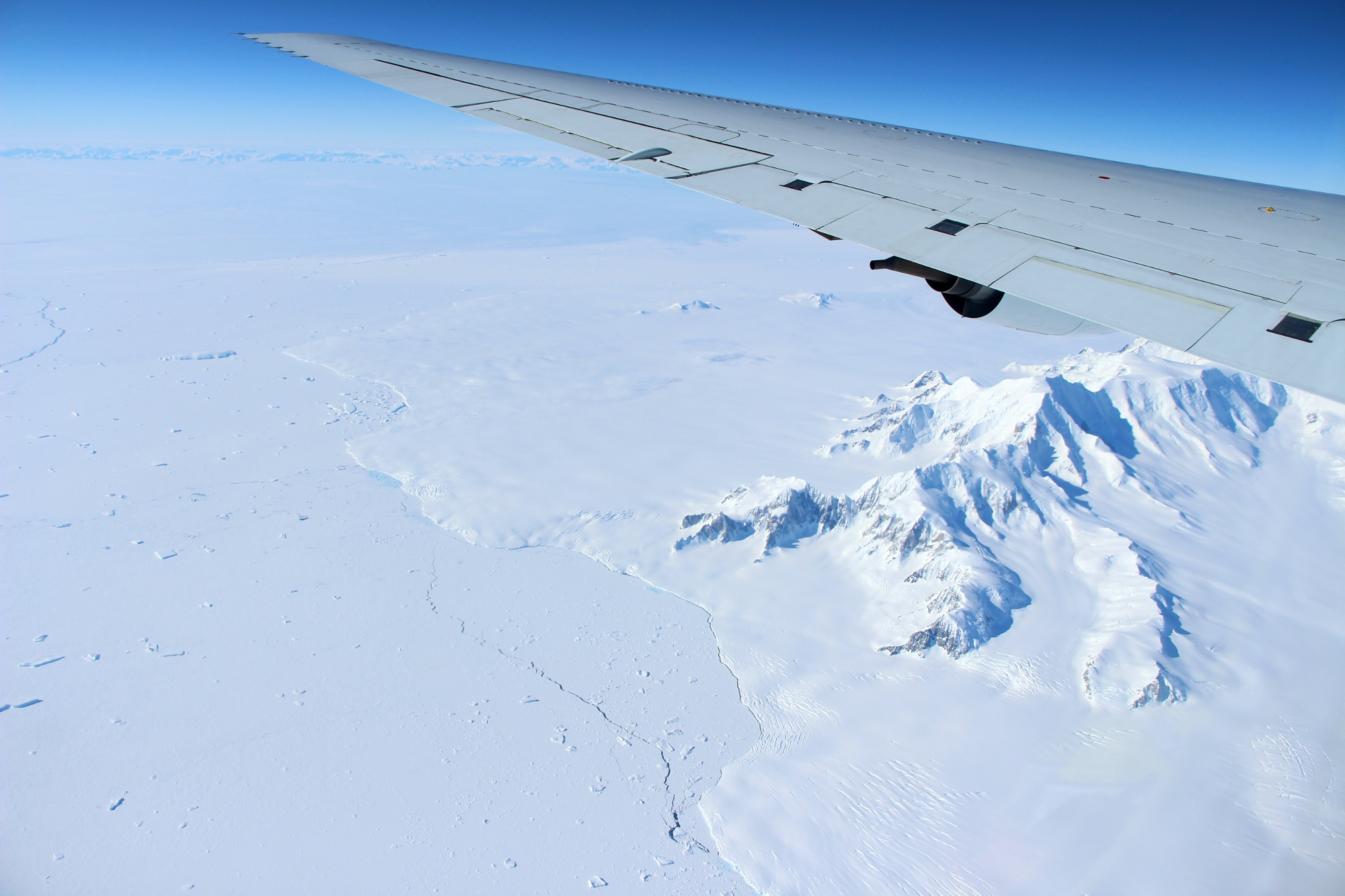
The north extremity of Alexander Island with Skaidava Bay in the centre and Rouen Mountains on the right

Skaidava Bay (Bulgarian: залив Скаидава, ‘Zaliv Skaidava’ \'za-liv ska-i-'da-va\) is the 10.5 km (6.5 mi) wide bay indenting for 3.2 km (2.0 mi) the north coast of Alexander Island, Antarctica 25 km (16 mi) west of the island's northeast extremity Cape Arauco. It is surmounted on the south by Mount Bayonne, the north extremity of Rouen Mountains. The vicinity was visited on 6 January 1988 by the geological survey party of Christo Pimpirev and Borislav Kamenov (First Bulgarian Antarctic Expedition), and Philip Nell and Peter Marquis (British Antarctic Survey).

The feature is named after the ancient Thracian settlement and Roman fortress of Skaidava in Northeastern Bulgaria.

== Location ==
The bay is centered at 68°51′10″S 71°01′40″W.

== Maps ==
- British Antarctic Territory. Scale 1:250000 topographic map. Sheet SR19-20/5. APC UK, 1991
- Antarctic Digital Database (ADD). Scale 1:250000 topographic map of Antarctica. Scientific Committee on Antarctic Research (SCAR). Since 1993, regularly upgraded and updated
