= Spanish Point (Antarctica) =

Point in the South Shetland Islands, Antarctica

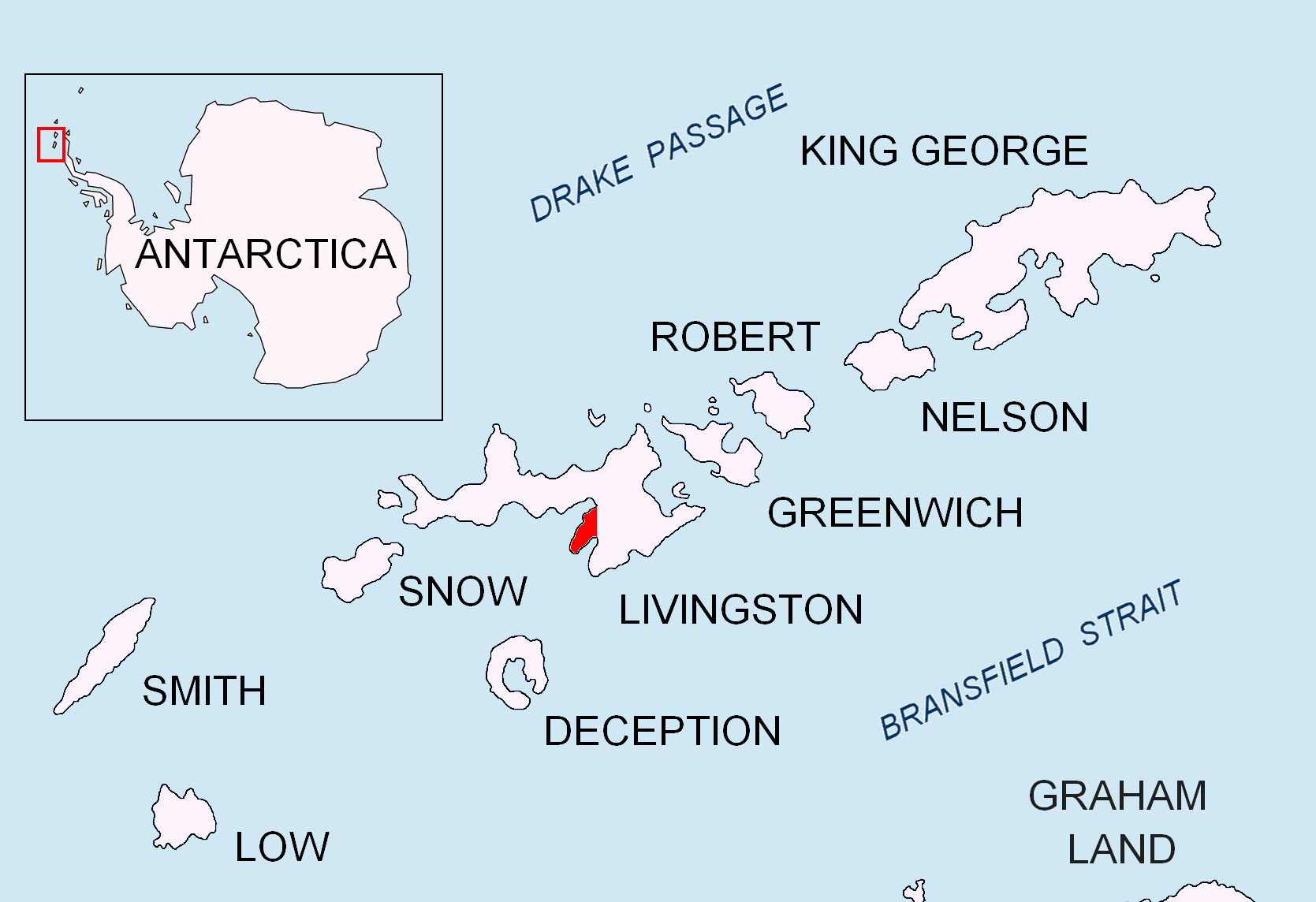
Location of Hurd Peninsula on Livingston Island in the South Shetland Islands.

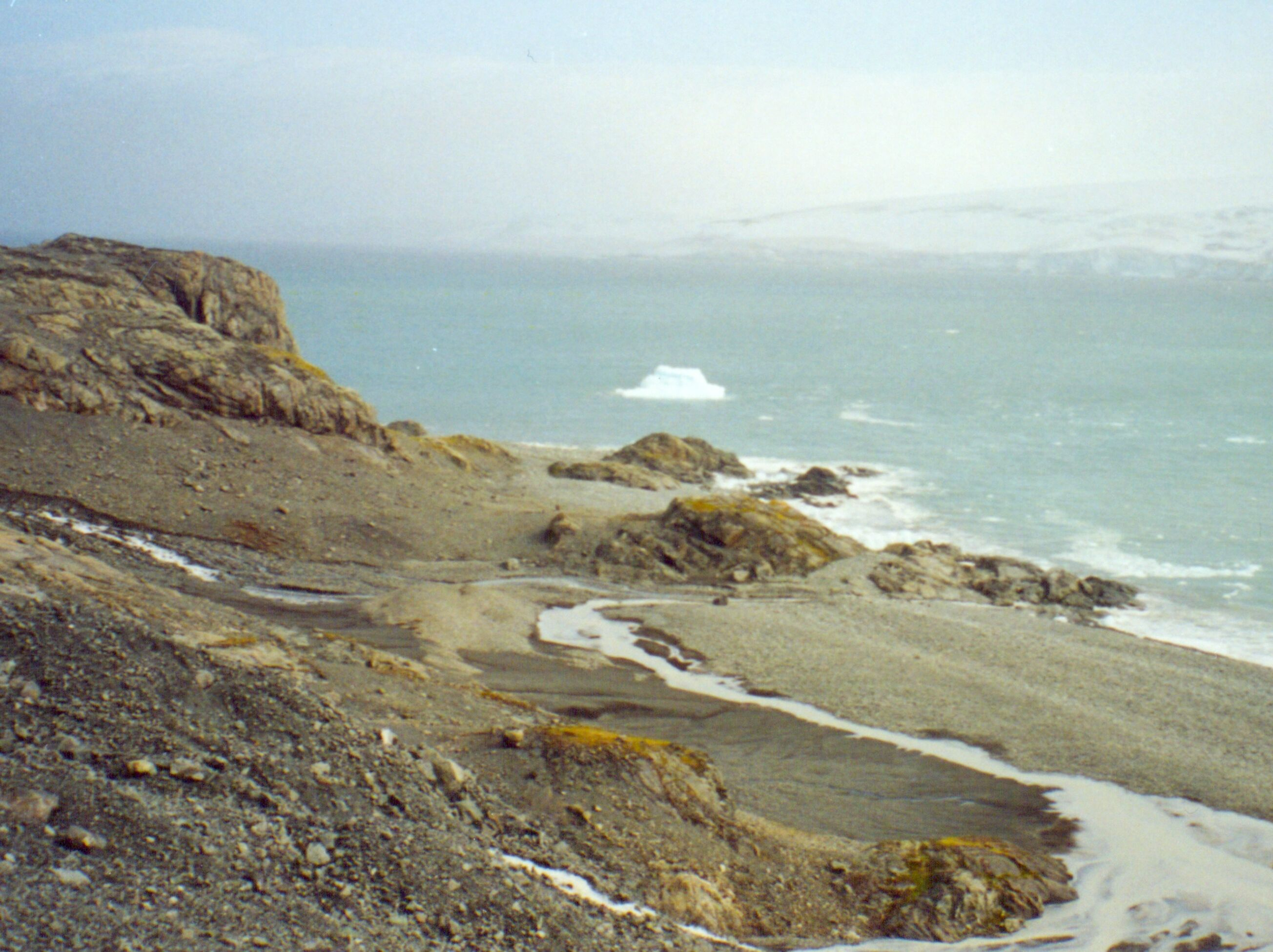
Spanish Point from the western slopes of Belozem Hill.

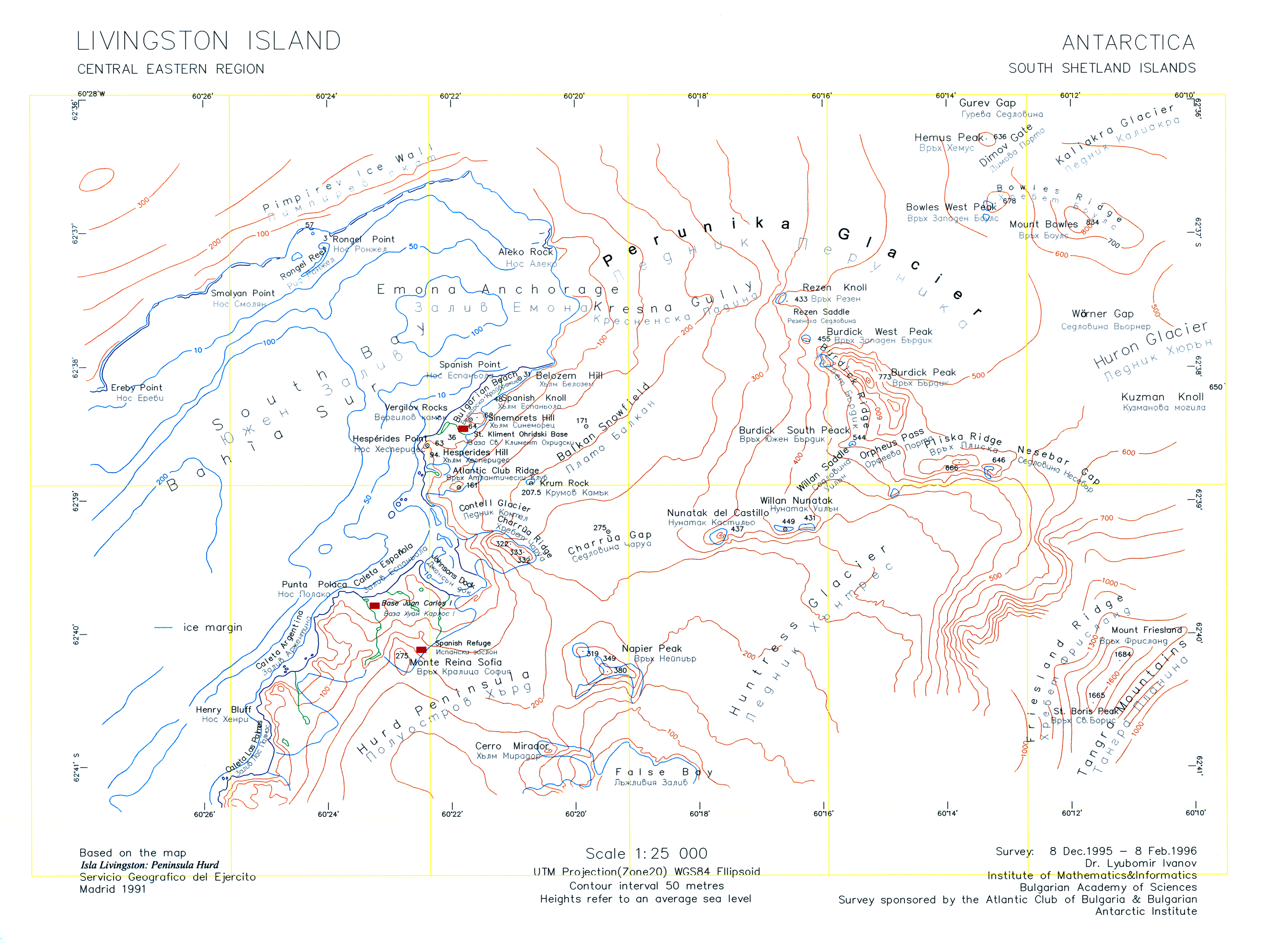
Topographic map of central-eastern Livingston Island featuring Spanish Point.

Topographic map of Livingston Island and Smith Island

Spanish Point (Nos Española \'nos e-spa-'nyo-la\) is located on Bulgarian Beach on Hurd Peninsula, eastern Livingston Island in the South Shetland Islands, Antarctica formed by an offshoot of Spanish Knoll.

The name was given in recognition of key Spanish logistic support for the Bulgarian Antarctic programme.

== Location ==
The point is located at 62°38′07″S 60°21′25″W, which is 610 m north-northeast of Sinemorets Hill, 1.34 km northeast of Hespérides Point and 4.06 km east-southeast of Smolyan Point. (British mapping in 1968, Spanish in 1991, and Bulgarian in 1996 and 2005. Co-ordinates, elevation and distances given according to a 1995-96 Bulgarian topographic survey).

== Maps ==
- South Shetland Islands. Scale 1:200000 topographic map. DOS 610 Sheet W 62 60. Tolworth, UK, 1968.
- Islas Livingston y Decepción. Mapa topográfico a escala 1:100000. Madrid: Servicio Geográfico del Ejército, 1991.
- Isla Livingston: Península Hurd. Mapa topográfico de escala 1:25000. Madrid: Servicio Geográfico del Ejército, 1991. (Map reproduced on p. 16 of the linked work)
- L.L. Ivanov. Livingston Island: Central-Eastern Region. Scale 1:25000 topographic map. Sofia: Antarctic Place-names Commission of Bulgaria, 1996.
- L.L. Ivanov et al., Antarctica: Livingston Island and Greenwich Island, South Shetland Islands (from English Strait to Morton Strait, with illustrations and ice-cover distribution), 1:100000 scale topographic map, Antarctic Place-names Commission of Bulgaria, Sofia, 2005
- L.L. Ivanov. Antarctica: Livingston Island and Greenwich, Robert, Snow and Smith Islands. Scale 1:120000 topographic map. Troyan: Manfred Wörner Foundation, 2010. ISBN 978-954-92032-9-5 (First edition 2009. ISBN 978-954-92032-6-4)
- Bulgarian Base (Sheet 1 and Sheet 2): Antarctica, South Shetland Islands, Livingston Island. Scale 1:2000 topographic map. Sofia: Military Geographic Service, 2016. (in Bulgarian, map images on slides 6 and 7 of the linked report)
- Antarctic Digital Database (ADD). Scale 1:250000 topographic map of Antarctica. Scientific Committee on Antarctic Research (SCAR). Since 1993, regularly upgraded and updated.
- L.L. Ivanov. Antarctica: Livingston Island and Smith Island. Scale 1:100000 topographic map. Manfred Wörner Foundation, 2017. ISBN 978-619-90008-3-0
