= Sladenia =

Sladenia is the scientific name of several genera of organisms and may refer to:

- Sladenia (echinoderm) de Loriol 1909, a genus of prehistoric echinoderms in the family Ophidiasteridae
- Sladenia (fish) Regan 1908, a genus of fish in the family Lophiidae
- Sladenia (plant) Kurz 1873, a genus of plants in the family Sladeniaceae
