= Macaroni Point =

Northeastern tip of Deception Island, Antarctica

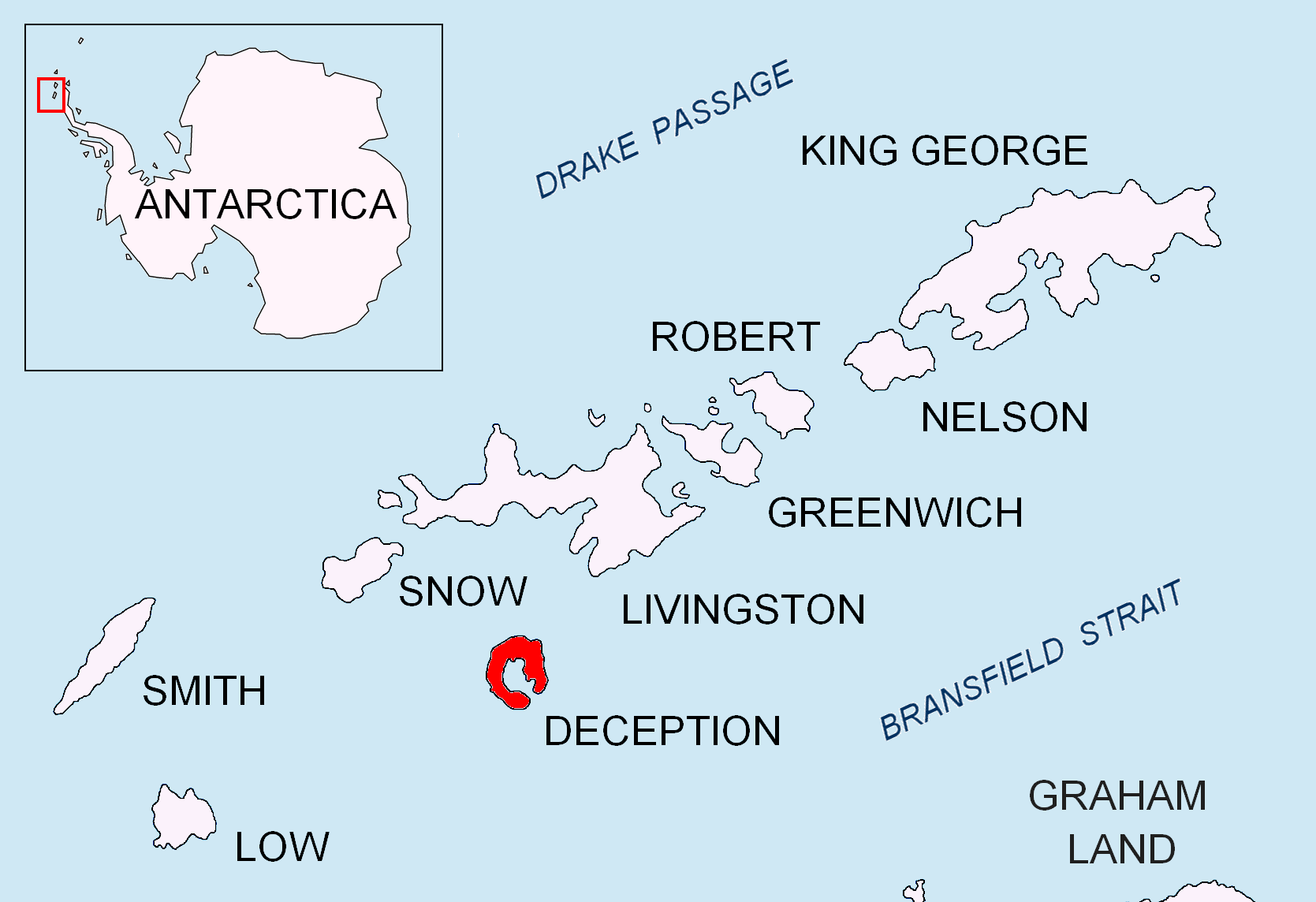
Location of Deception Island in the South Shetland Islands.

Macaroni Point (62°54′S 60°32′W) is a point marking the northeastern extremity of Deception Island, in the South Shetland Islands, Antarctica. The name arose following survey by the Falkland Islands Dependencies Survey in January 1954, because a colony of macaroni penguins (Eudyptes chrysolophus) was on this point.
