= Samotino Point =

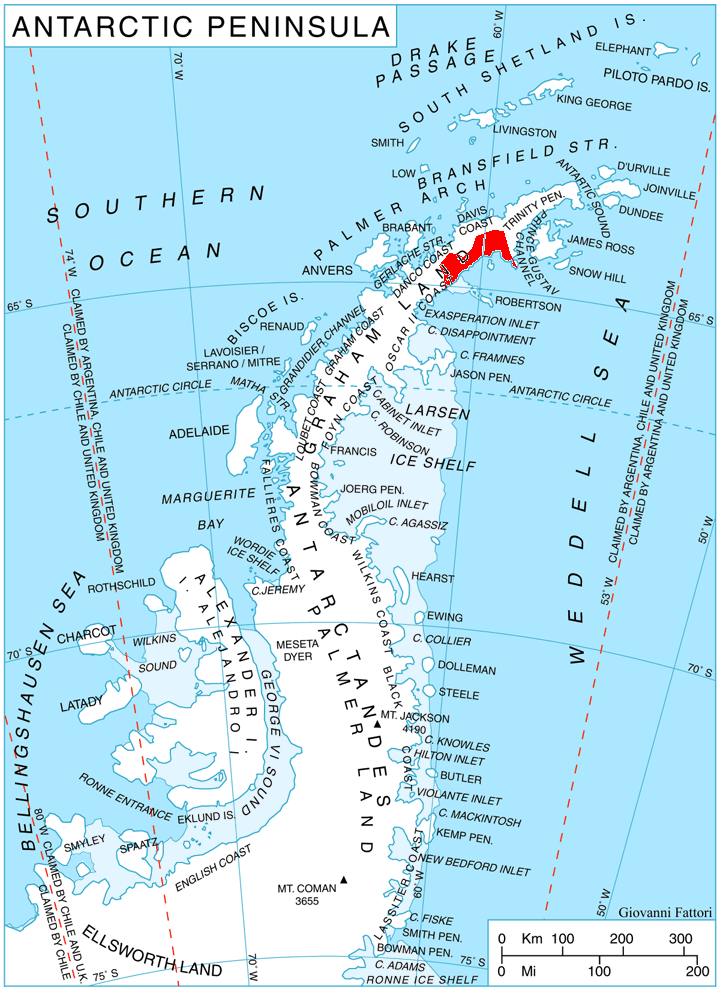
Location of Nordenskjöld Coast.

Samotino Point (Bulgarian: нос Самотино, ‘Nos Samotino’ \'nos sa-'mo-ti-no\) is the ice-covered point on the southeast side of the entrance to Pizos Bay on Nordenskjöld Coast in Graham Land, Antarctica. It was formed as a result of glacier retreat in the last decade of 20th century.

The feature is named after the settlement of Samotino in northeastern Bulgaria.

== Location ==
Samotino Point is located at 64°31′00″S 58°59′32″W, which is 10.65 km southeast of Porphyry Bluff, 9.4 km northwest of Cape Longing, and 30 km east-northeast of Cape Sobral. SCAR Antarctic Digital Database mapping in 2012.

== Maps ==
- Antarctic Digital Database (ADD). Scale 1:250000 topographic map of Antarctica. Scientific Committee on Antarctic Research (SCAR). Since 1993, regularly upgraded and updated.
