= Ralitsa, Kardzhali Province =

Ralitsa Ралица
- Village
- Location within Bulgaria
- Coordinates: 41.4500°N 25.5000°E
- Country: Bulgaria
- Province: Kardzhali Province
- Municipality: Momchilgrad
- Elevation: 197 m (646 ft)
- Time zone: UTC+2 (EET)
  - Summer (DST): UTC+3 (EEST)

Ralitsa is a village in Momchilgrad Municipality, Kardzhali Province, southern Bulgaria.

== Honours ==
Ralitsa Glacier on Brabant Island, Antarctica is named after the village.
