= Guyou Bay =

Bay in Antarctica

Location of Brabant Island in the Antarctic Peninsula region.

Guyou Bay (64°5′S 62°35′W) is a bay 4 nautical miles (7 km) wide, which indents the west coast of Brabant Island between Claude Point and Metchnikoff Point, in the Palmer Archipelago, Antarctica. Its head is fed by Dodelen, Oshane and Ralitsa Glaciers.

The bay was discovered by the French Antarctic Expedition, 1903–05, under Jean-Baptiste Charcot, who named it for Captain Emile Guyou of the French Navy, distinguished in the field of naval science and a member of the commission which published the scientific results of the expedition.

== Maps ==
- Antarctic Digital Database (ADD). Scale 1:250000 topographic map of Antarctica. Scientific Committee on Antarctic Research (SCAR). Since 1993, regularly upgraded and updated.
- British Antarctic Territory. Scale 1:200000 topographic map. DOS 610 Series, Sheet W 64 62. Directorate of Overseas Surveys, Tolworth, UK, 1980.
- Brabant Island to Argentine Islands. Scale 1:250000 topographic map. British Antarctic Survey, 2008.
