= Mount Sladen =

Mountain in the South Orkney Islands

Coordinates: 60°41′S 45°17′W

Mount Sladen is a conspicuous pyramid-shaped mountain, 890 m, standing 1.5 nautical miles (2.8 km) northeast of Saunders Point in eastern Coronation Island, in the South Orkney Islands. Surveyed by the Falkland Islands Dependencies Survey (FIDS) in 1948–49. Named by the United Kingdom Antarctic Place-Names Committee (UK-APC) for Dr. William J.L. Sladen of the FIDS, medical officer and biologist at Hope Bay in 1948, and at Signy Island in 1950. During the 1960s and 1970s, Dr. Sladen was chief United States Antarctic Research Program (USARP) investigator concerned with studies of penguins at Cape Crozier, Ross Island.
