= Metchnikoff Point =

Headland in Antarctica

Coordinates: 64°3′S 62°34′W

Metchnikoff Point is a point forming the western extremity of Pasteur Peninsula in northern Brabant Island, in the Palmer Archipelago, Antarctica. It was first charted by the Third French Antarctic Expedition, 1903–05, and named by Jean-Baptiste Charcot for Russian-born zoologist and bacteriologist Élie Metchnikoff, who succeeded Louis Pasteur as the director of the Pasteur Institute in Paris.

== Historic site ==
A plaque is mounted at an elevation of 70 m on the crest of the moraine separating the point from the adjacent glacier. The inscription reads:

This monument was built by François de Gerlache and other members of the Joint Services Expedition 1983-85 to commemorate the first landing on Brabant Island by the Belgian Antarctic Expedition, 1897-99: Adrien de Gerlache (Belgium) leader, Roald Amundsen (Norway), Henryk Arctowski (Poland), Frederick Cook (USA) and Emile Danco (Belgium) camped nearby from 30 January to 6 February 1898.

It has been designated a Historic Site or Monument (HSM 45), following a proposal by Belgium to the Antarctic Treaty Consultative Meeting.

== Maps ==
- Antarctic Digital Database (ADD). Scale 1:250000 topographic map of Antarctica. Scientific Committee on Antarctic Research (SCAR). Since 1993, regularly upgraded and updated.
- British Antarctic Territory. Scale 1:200000 topographic map. DOS 610 Series, Sheet W 64 62. Directorate of Overseas Surveys, Tolworth, UK, 1980.
- Brabant Island to Argentine Islands. Scale 1:250000 topographic map. British Antarctic Survey, 2008.
