= Tophet Bastion =

Conspicuous ice-capped rock wall 1 nautical mile long

Tophet Bastion (60°42′S 45°17′W) is a conspicuous ice-capped rock wall, 1 nautical mile (1.9 km) long, with an apron of talus. It stands 1 nautical mile (1.9 km) east of Saunders Point on the south coast of Coronation Island in the South Orkney Islands. Roughly surveyed in 1933 by DI personnel. The name, which is biblical, was applied by the Falkland Islands Dependencies Survey (FIDS) following their survey of 1948–49.
