= Belozem Hill =

Hill in the east of Livingston Island, South Shetland Islands in Antarctica

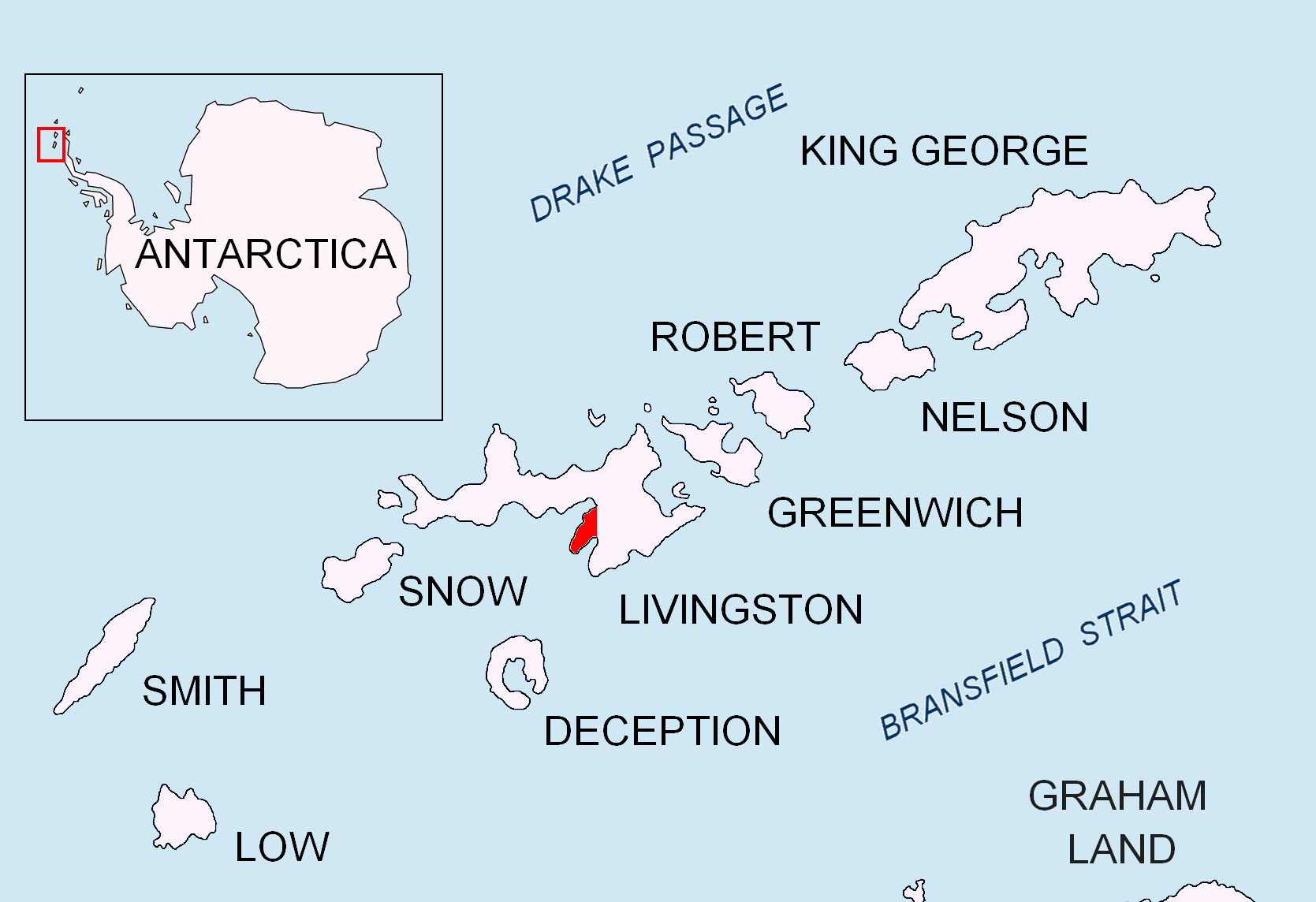
Location of Hurd Peninsula on Livingston Island in the South Shetland Islands.

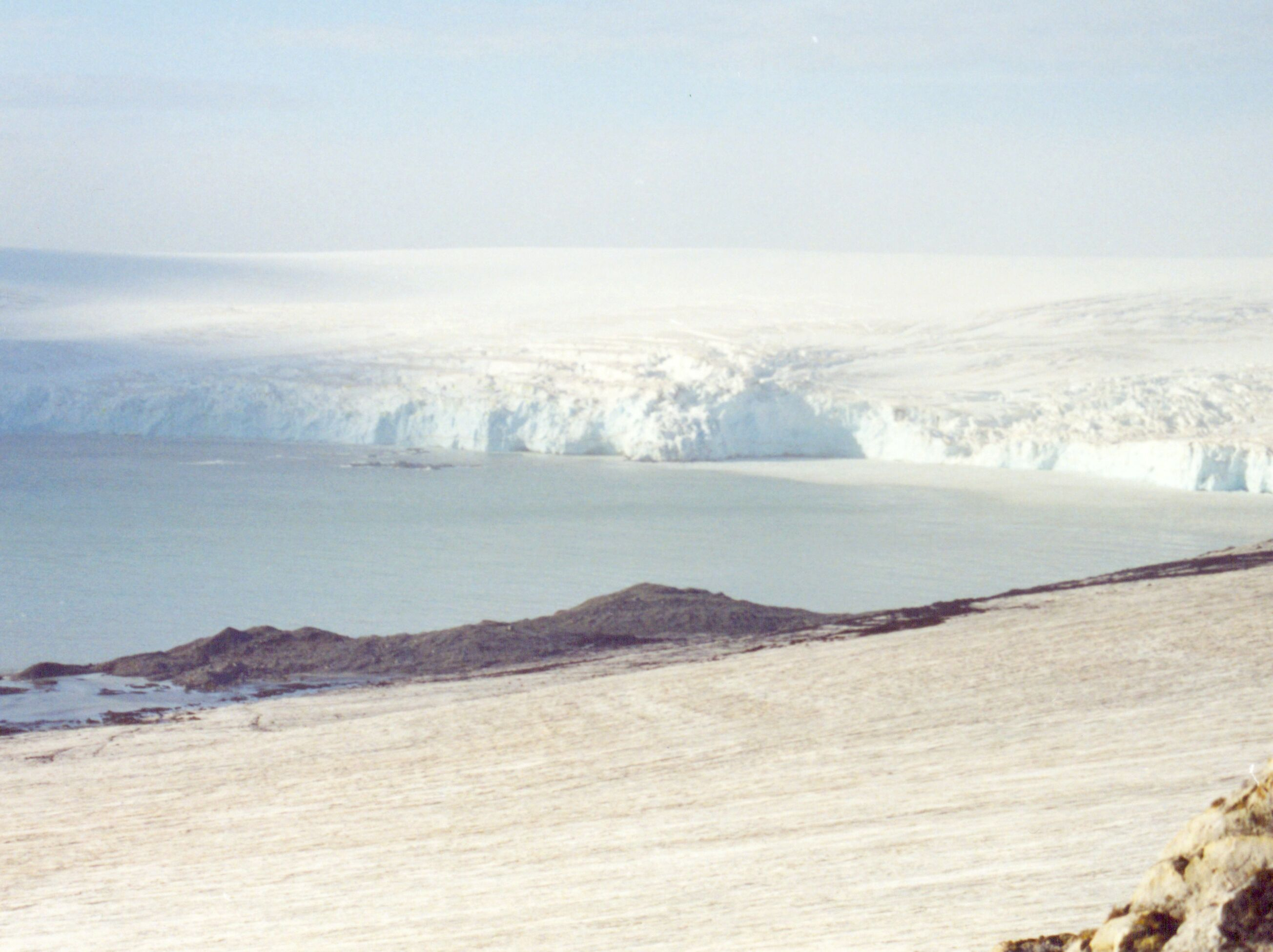
Belozem Hill, with Balkan Snowfield in the foreground, and Emona Anchorage and Aleko Point in the background.

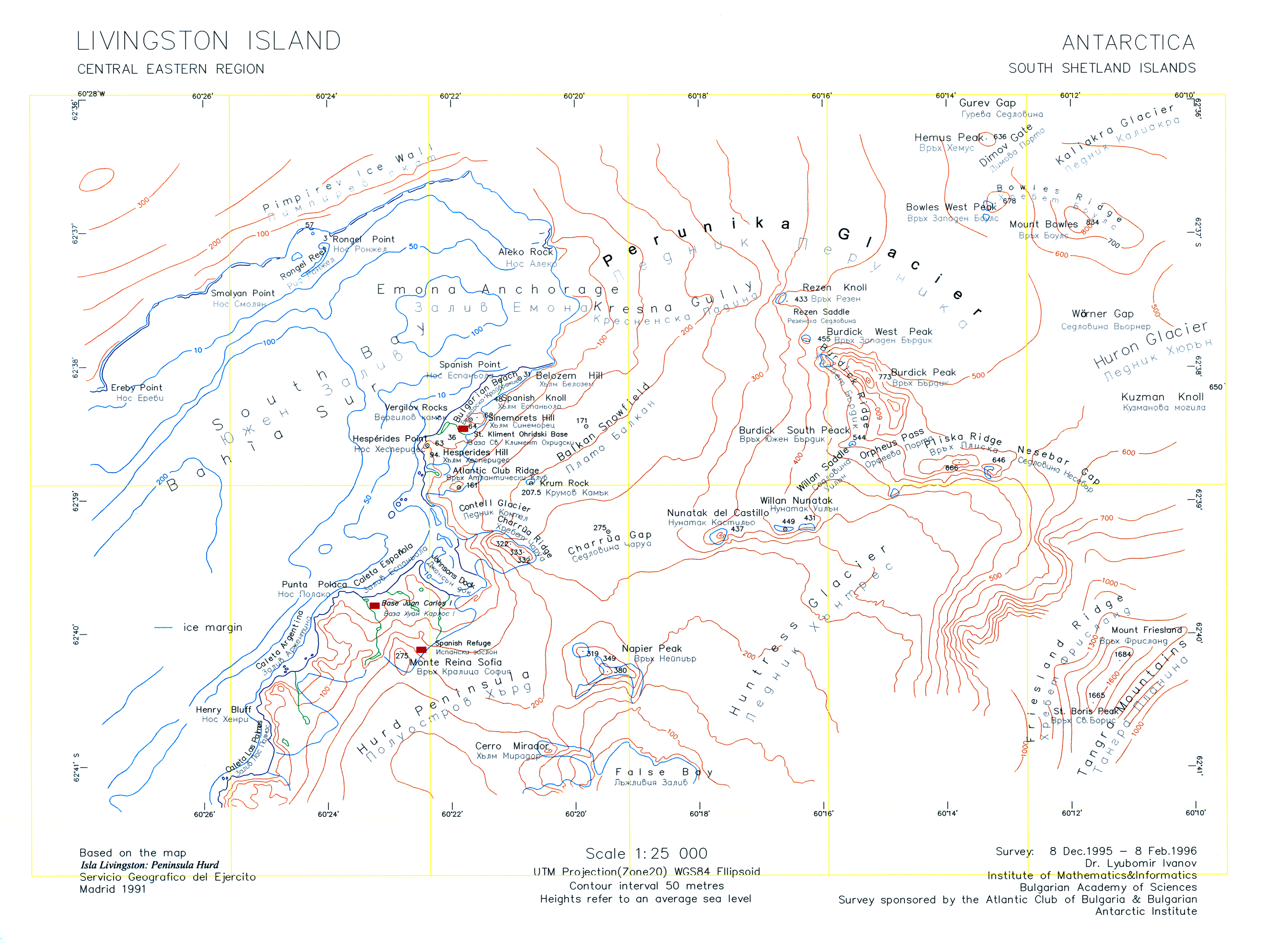
Topographic map of central-eastern Livingston Island featuring Belozem Hill.

Topographic map of Livingston Island and Smith Island

Belozem Hill (Halm Belozem) is the northeasternmost of a chain of hills along Bulgarian Beach on Hurd Peninsula in the east of Livingston Island, South Shetland Islands in Antarctica. The hill is boulder-clay capped with twin summits; the higher east-northeastern of them rising to 41 m. It is snow free in summer. The hill was mapped by the Spanish Servicio Geográfico del Ejército in 1991, and by Bulgaria in 1996 and 2005.

Belozem is the name of a settlement in southern Bulgaria, ‘belozem’ being the Bulgarian for ‘white soil.’

== Location ==
The hill is located at 62°38′08″S 60°20′52″W which is 880m northeast of Sinemorets Hill, 3.8 km west-southwest of Rezen Knoll and 2.12 km south by west of Aleko Point. (According to a 1995-96 Bulgarian topographic survey.)

== See also ==
- Livingston Island
- List of Bulgarian toponyms in Antarctica
- Antarctic Place-names Commission

== Maps ==
- Isla Livingston: Península Hurd. Mapa topográfico de escala 1:25000. Madrid: Servicio Geográfico del Ejército, 1991. (Map reproduced on p. 16 of the linked work)
- L.L. Ivanov. Livingston Island: Central-Eastern Region. Scale 1:25000 topographic map. Sofia: Antarctic Place-names Commission of Bulgaria, 1996.
- L.L. Ivanov et al. Antarctica: Livingston Island and Greenwich Island, South Shetland Islands. Scale 1:100000 topographic map. Sofia: Antarctic Place-names Commission of Bulgaria, 2005.
- L.L. Ivanov. Antarctica: Livingston Island and Greenwich, Robert, Snow and Smith Islands. Scale 1:120000 topographic map. Troyan: Manfred Wörner Foundation, 2009. ISBN 978-954-92032-6-4
- Bulgarian Base (Sheet 1 and Sheet 2): Antarctica, South Shetland Islands, Livingston Island. Scale 1:2000 topographic map. Sofia: Military Geographic Service, 2016. (in Bulgarian, map images on slides 6 and 7 of the linked report)
- Antarctic Digital Database (ADD). Scale 1:250000 topographic map of Antarctica. Scientific Committee on Antarctic Research (SCAR). Since 1993, regularly upgraded and updated.
- L.L. Ivanov. Antarctica: Livingston Island and Smith Island. Scale 1:100000 topographic map. Manfred Wörner Foundation, 2017. ISBN 978-619-90008-3-0
