= Bouquet Bay =

Coordinates: 64.05°S 62.166667°W

Bouquet Bay is a bay, 7 miles wide, lying between Liege Island and the N part of Brabant Island, in the Palmer Archipelago. Discovered by the FrAE, 1903–05, and named by Charcot for Jean Bouquet de la Grye, French hydrographic engineer and a member of the commission which published the scientific results of the expedition.
