= Cape Cockburn =

Northeastern extremity of Pasteur peninsula, Brabant Island, Palmer Archipelago

Cape Cockburn (64°1′S 62°18′W) is a cape marking the northeastern extremity of Pasteur Peninsula on Brabant Island, in the Palmer Archipelago. The name appears on a chart based upon a British expedition under Henry Foster, 1828–31, who perhaps gave the name for George Cockburn, British naval officer and Admiral of the Fleet in 1851. The cape was charted by the French Antarctic Expedition, 1903–05, under Jean-Baptiste Charcot. The cape was photographed from the air by Falkland Islands and Dependencies Aerial Survey Expedition in 1956–57.
