= Saunders Point =

Saunders Point (60°42′S 45°19′W) is the southern extremity of the small island lying between Amphibolite Point and Tophet Bastion, off the south coast of Coronation Island in the South Orkney Islands. Charted by DI personnel from the Discovery II in 1933. Named for A. Saunders who was aboard Discovery II and photographed the South Orkney Islands.
