= Cape Roux =

Cape Roux (64°1′S 62°28′W) is a cape marking the northwest extremity of Pasteur Peninsula, northern Brabant Island, in the Palmer Archipelago. Discovered by the French Antarctic Expedition, 1903–1905, and named by Charcot for Emile Roux, noted French physician and bacteriologist, then Director of the Pasteur Institute, Paris.

== Maps ==
- Antarctic Digital Database (ADD). Scale 1:250000 topographic map of Antarctica. Scientific Committee on Antarctic Research (SCAR). Since 1993, regularly upgraded and updated.
- British Antarctic Territory. Scale 1:200000 topographic map. DOS 610 Series, Sheet W 64 62. Directorate of Overseas Surveys, Tolworth, UK, 1980.
- Brabant Island to Argentine Islands. Scale 1:250000 topographic map. British Antarctic Survey, 2008.
