= Lister Glacier (Palmer Archipelago) =

Glacier in the Palmer Archipelago, Antarctica

- Location of Bradant Island in the Antarctic Peninsula region

- Location within Antarctica
- Location: Palmer Archipelago
- Coordinates: 64°5′S 62°19′W
- Length: 5 nmi (9 km; 6 mi)
- Width: 1 nmi (2 km; 1 mi)
- Thickness: unknown
- Terminus: Bouquet Bay
- Status: unknown

Lister Glacier (64°5′S 62°19′W) is a glacier 5 nautical miles (9 km) long and 1 nautical mile (2 km) wide, draining the northeast slopes of Stribog Mountains and flowing into Bouquet Bay just south of Duclaux Point on the northeast side of Brabant Island, in the Palmer Archipelago, Antarctica.

The glacier was shown on an Argentine government chart in 1953, but not named. It was photographed by Hunting Aerosurveys Ltd in 1956–57, and mapped from these photos in 1959. It was named by the UK Antarctic Place-Names Committee for Joseph Lister, 1st Baron Lister, an English surgeon who was the founder of antiseptic surgery.

== See also ==
- List of glaciers in the Antarctic
- Glaciology

== Maps ==
- Antarctic Digital Database (ADD). Scale 1:250000 topographic map of Antarctica. Scientific Committee on Antarctic Research (SCAR). Since 1993, regularly upgraded and updated.
- British Antarctic Territory. Scale 1:200000 topographic map. DOS 610 Series, Sheet W 64 62. Directorate of Overseas Surveys, Tolworth, UK, 1980.
- Brabant Island to Argentine Islands. Scale 1:250000 topographic map. British Antarctic Survey, 2008.
