= Pasteur Peninsula =

Peninsula in Antarctica

Coordinates: 64°4′S 62°24′W

Location of Brabant Island in the Antarctic Peninsula region.

Pasteur Peninsula is a broad peninsula 9 km (5.6 mi) long in a north-south direction and ranging from 8–13 km (5.0–8.1 mi) wide between Guyou Bay and Bouquet Bay, forming the north end of Brabant Island in the Palmer Archipelago of Antarctica. Its interior is occupied by the northern part of Stribog Mountains drained by Oshane, Podayva, Burevestnik and Lister Glaciers.

The peninsula was mapped by the French Antarctic Expedition, 1903–05, and named by its leader Jean-Baptiste Charcot in honour of Louis Pasteur.

== Maps ==
- Antarctic Digital Database (ADD). Scale 1:250000 topographic map of Antarctica. Scientific Committee on Antarctic Research (SCAR). Since 1993, regularly upgraded and updated.
- British Antarctic Territory. Scale 1:200000 topographic map. DOS 610 Series, Sheet W 64 62. Directorate of Overseas Surveys, Tolworth, UK, 1980.
- Brabant Island to Argentine Islands. Scale 1:250000 topographic map. British Antarctic Survey, 2008.

== See also ==
- List of things named after Louis Pasteur
