= Hunting plc =

British oil and gas company

- Type: Public
- Traded as: LSE: HTG
- Industry: Energy
- Founded: 1874
- Headquarters: London, UK and Houston. United States
- Key people: Richard Hunting, Chairman; Jim Johnson, CEO
- Revenue: ▼£1,018.8 million (2025)
- Operating income: ▲£76.3 million (2025)
- Net income: ▲£42.8 million (2025)
- Number of employees: 2,312 (2025)
- Website: www.huntingplc.com

Hunting plc is a British-based manufacturer and supplier of products and services to the oil and gas industry, aerospace, medical and power generation sectors. Some 27% of the business is owned by the Hunting family. It is listed on the London Stock Exchange and is a constituent of the FTSE 250 Index.

== History ==
The company was founded in 1874 by Charles Hunting, a veterinary surgeon, as a shipping business. The business, originally known as Hunting & Pattison, was managed by the founder's son, Charles Samuel Hunting, and comprised two sailing ships, the Genii and the Sylvia.

In the 1890s the Hunting and Pattison partnership was dissolved, and a new partnership called Hunting & Son was formed in 1892. The company invested in oil tankers and became a tanker broker.

The company became a limited company, Hunting & Son Ltd, in 1926, with Percy and Lindsay Hunting as Governing Directors. In 1936 it diversified into aircraft maintenance and manufacturing as well as air transport, establishing Hunting Aircraft in 1944 by the purchase of Percival Aircraft: this business was absorbed into the British Aircraft Corporation in 1960.

The company started it move into the oil industry in 1938 with the founding of the Sylva Oil Company and the Brazos Young Corporation, in a long-running partnership with the McAlester Fuel Company.

Percy Huntings became interested in aerial photography and surveying, with the group acquiring Aerofilms and Aircraft Operating Company. These companies were later rebranded as Hunting Aerosurveys.

At the end of 1945, Hunting entered the airline business and established Hunting Air Travel Ltd, a business headquartered at Luton Airport. The new airline began commercial operations from Bovingdon Airport at the start of 1946. In 1951, Hunting Air Travel changed its name to Hunting Air Transport. Another change of name occurred in late 1953, when Hunting Air Transport became Hunting-Clan Air Transport. This change of name resulted from the Hunting family's decision to split the group and to transfer their airline business to a new holding company which they had set up together with the Scottish Clan Line, a rival shipping company owned by the Cayzer family.

1957 saw the Weapons Research Division becoming a separate company, Hunting Engineering Ltd, a major UK defence contractor. In 1960 the acquisition of Halmatic a fibreglass company and the beginning of a boat hulls manufacturing business. A parent company, Hunting Light Industries, was formed in 1960, for the engineering aspects of the business.

A public company, Hunting Associated Industries Ltd, was formed in 1965, incorporating Hunting Light Industries, and Hunting Surveys (Holdings) Ltd.

Together with Canadian Aeroservices Ltd, Hunting Geology and Geophysics Ltd completed the Great Britain aeromagnetic survey between 1955 and 1965. This was created by flying survery aircraft at 1,000 feet (300 m) along north-south and east-west lines. Other surveys included the first geological survey of the United Arab Emirates in 1976. and a aeromagnetic and seismic reflection survey of Nepal.

In 1978, a holding company, Hunting Petroleum Services Ltd, was formed for the oil and gas related part of the business. This included Hunting Gibson, and Hunting Associated Industries.

The 1980's saw more reorganisation and consolidation of activities. By 1981 there were three public companies: Hunting Gibson plc, Hunting Associated Industries plc and Hunting Petroleum Services plc. Ship-owning activities ceased in 1983, and the Hunting Surveys Ltd. and Hunting Geology and Geophysics Ltd closed in 1987. Hunting Gibson plc became Hunting Group plc and acquired the whole of the privately owned Hunting Group, and in 1989 it is renamed to simply Hunting plc.

In June 1998, Hunting Cargo Airlines was sold to a consortium consisting of CMB (Belgium) and Safair (part of the Imperial Group) and rechristened ACL (Air Contractors Limited). In the 1990s, Hunting became involved in defence contracts, notably, in 1993, being a member of the winning consortium contracted to manage the Atomic Weapons Establishment, a contract that lasted until 2003. More recently, it refocused on its core oil and gas activities.

In December 2008, it completed the disposal of Gibson Energy, its operation transporting and marketing crude oil in Canada, for a total consideration of £517m. On 16 August 2010, Hunting PLC announced the acquisition of Innova-Extel Acquisition Holdings Inc. for a cash consideration of US$125 million.

On 5 August 2011 Hunting announced the acquisition of Titan Group for $775 million. On 12 August 2011 Hunting announced the acquisition of Dearborn Precision Tubular Products for US83.5 million.

As of 1 September 2017, Jim Johnson was promoted from the role of COO to the role of CEO to replace Dennis Proctor.

== The Hunting Family ==
Members of the Hunting Family have run the group for most of its history.

- Charles Samuel Hunting (1853—1921) formed a partnership with William Pattison in 1874.
- His father Charles Hunting (b. 1822) joins the partnership in 1878.
- Sir Percy Llewellyn Hunting (b. 1885) becomes a partner in 1907, and manages the group until 1960.
- Gerald Lindsay Hunting (b. 1891) becomes a partner in 1911, he retired in 1961.
- Pat Hunting (1911—1993) becomes chairman in 1962 retiring in 1974
- Clive Hunting (1926—2000) is appointed chair in 1975 retiring as chair in 1991 and from the board in 1996
- Richard (Hugh) Hunting becomes HPLC Chair in 1991

== Current operations ==
Operations include:

- Well Construction: provides products and services for the construction phase of the wellbore development.
- Well Completion: provides products and services that support the completion and re-completion phases of wellbore development.
- Well Intervention: provides products and services that support the intervention and subsea support phases of wellbore production and maintenance.

== See also ==
- List of oilfield service companies

== Sources ==
- "Flight International". Flight International. Sutton, UK: Reed Business Information. ISSN 0015-3710. (various backdated issues relating to Hunting Air Travel, Hunting Air Transport and Hunting-Clan Air Transport, 1946-1960)
