= Alan David Butler =

Rhodesian sailor and businessman

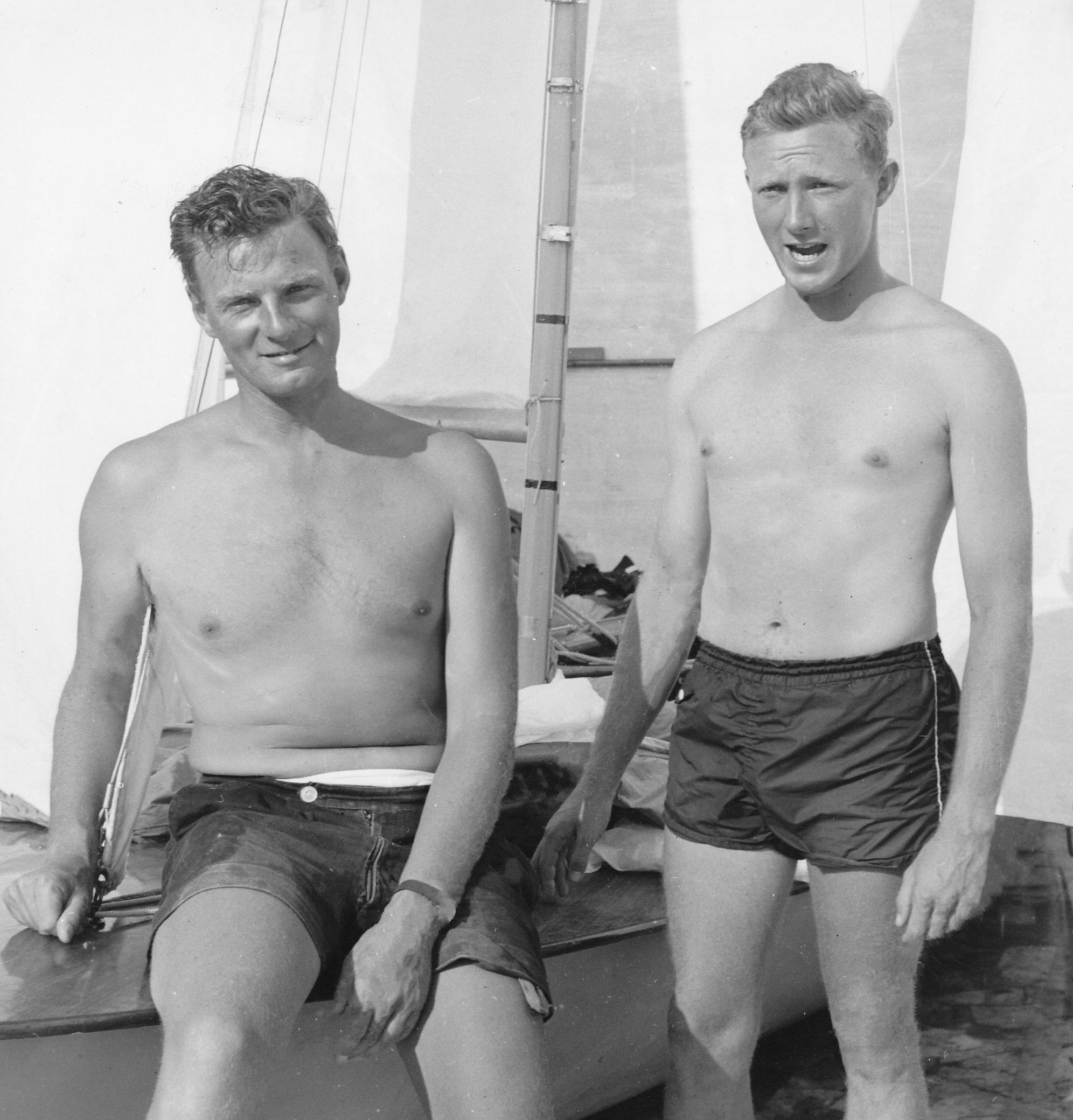
- Butler (left) with Christopher Bevan at the 1960 Summer Olympics

Leader of the Opposition of Southern Rhodesia
- In office 12 February 1965 – 7 May 1965
- Preceded by: Edgar Whitehead
- Succeeded by: Josiah Gondo

Member of the Southern Rhodesian Legislative Assembly for Highlands South
- In office 1962–1965
- Preceded by: New constituency
- Succeeded by: Richard Hope Hall

Personal details
- Born: 23 October 1927 London, England
- Died: July 1972 (aged 44) Belgium
- Party: Rhodesia Party
- Other political affiliations: United Federal Party
- Spouses: Joanna (m. 1951; died 1970); Jill Ord (m. 1971)
- Children: 2
- Parent(s): Alan Samuel Butler (father); Lois Butler (mother)
- Education: Eton College
- Occupation: Politician, businessman, sailor
- Sports career
- Height: 1.88 m (6 ft 2 in)
- Weight: 91 kg (201 lb)
- Country: Rhodesia
- Sport: Sailing
- Event: Flying Dutchman

Sports achievements and titles
- Olympic finals: 4th – 1960 Rome; 11th – 1964 Tokyo

Alan David Butler (23 October 1927 – July 1972) was a Rhodesian politician, businessman and Olympic sailor. He represented Highlands South in the Southern Rhodesian Legislative Assembly from 1962 to 1965 and led the opposition Rhodesia Party in 1965. He also competed in the Flying Dutchman sailing event at the 1960 and 1964 Summer Olympics, finishing fourth and eleventh, respectively.

== Family ==
Butler was born in London to Lois Butler and Alan Samuel Butler. His mother competed in Alpine skiing at the 1936 Winter Olympics for Canada, and flew as a pilot for the Air Transport Auxiliary during the Second World War. His father was the chairman of the de Havilland Aircraft Company.

In 1951 Butler married Joanna; they had two sons, Nigel and Rhett. Joanna died of cancer in October 1970.

In July 1971 Butler married Jill Ord.

== Education ==
Butler studied at Eton College in England, and also spent some of his junior years in Canada.

== Business career ==
Butler operated a cattle ranch near Balla Balla in Matabeleland and developed several business interests, including a charter aircraft company. His enterprises also included agricultural aviation operations.

== Political career ==
Butler entered Southern Rhodesian politics as a member of the United Federal Party (UFP). In the 1962 Southern Rhodesian general election, he was elected to the Southern Rhodesian Legislative Assembly for Highlands South. The election brought the Rhodesian Front, led by Winston Field, to power, while the UFP became the principal parliamentary opposition.

Following the retirement of Sir Roy Welensky from politics in December 1964, Butler defeated former prime minister Sir Edgar Whitehead in a secret ballot for the leadership of the Rhodesia Party, the successor to the UFP, on 11 February 1965. He became Leader of the Opposition in the Legislative Assembly.

Butler supported the existing constitution and electoral franchise, which maintained political control in the hands of the white minority, but opposed the Rhodesian Front government's proposals for more restrictive racial policies. He also criticised African nationalist organisations that advocated revolutionary or unconstitutional methods.

In 1965, Butler declined an opportunity to attempt to form a government when Governor Sir Humphrey Gibbs considered Prime Minister Ian Smith's request for an early general election.

In the general election of 7 May 1965, the Rhodesian Front won all 50 predominantly white constituency seats, defeating the Rhodesia Party and ending Butler's parliamentary career. He lost Highlands South to Richard Hope Hall. Butler was succeeded as Leader of the Opposition by Josiah Gondo of the predominantly black African United People's Party, which won 10 of the 15 district seats.

== Sports ==
In the late 1940s he was a candidate for the British Alpine skiing Olympic team, but broke his ankles and ended his skiing career.

In the 1950s he entered politics as a member of the Rhodesian parliament, and by the 1965 election was a leader of the United Federal Party. His party lost that election to Rhodesian Front, a party that promoted the policy of white rule in the country. This resulted in the suspension of Rhodesia from the Olympic movement, closing any prospects for the 1968 Olympics for Butler.

== Death ==
Butler was preparing for the 1972 Games in Europe, but was killed in a road accident in Belgium. His ashes were scattered from his own crop-spraying aircraft over his cattle ranch at Balla Balla. Butler's wife Ord was seriously injured in the accident that killed Butler.

Southern Rhodesian Legislative Assembly
New constituency	Member of Parliament for Highlands South; 1962 – 1965	Succeeded by Richard Hope Hall
