= Richard Hope Hall =

British-Rhodesian politician (1924–2007)

Richard Hope Hall ICD

Deputy Speaker of the House of Assembly
- In office 1973 – 31 August 1977

Member of the Southern Rhodesian Legislative Assembly for Highlands South
- In office 7 May 1965 – 10 April 1970
- Preceded by: Alan David Butler
- Succeeded by: Assembly dissolved

Member of the House of Assembly of Rhodesia for Highlands South
- In office 10 April 1970 – 31 August 1977
- Preceded by: New constituency
- Succeeded by: John Christie

Chairman of the Dominion Party
- In office 1960–1962
- Succeeded by: Party disestablished

Personal details
- Born: 5 June 1924 Bideford, Devon, United Kingdom
- Died: 17 November 2007 (aged 83) Tadley, Hampshire, United Kingdom
- Resting place: Tadley, Hampshire, United Kingdom
- Party: Dominion Party (before 1962); Rhodesian Front (1962–1976); Rhodesian Action (1976–77)
- Spouse: Renée Tyndale-Biscoe (m. 1952)
- Children: Robert, Mark, & Andrew

Military service
- Allegiance: United Kingdom
- Branch/service: Royal Navy
- Years of service: 1942–47
- Battles/wars: World War II

Richard Brathwaite Hope Hall ICD (5 June 1924 – 17 November 2007) was a British-born merchant banker, businessman, and politician active in Rhodesia (now Zimbabwe) during the 1960s and 70s. A member of Prime Minister Ian Smith's UDI cabinet, he served as a member of parliament in Rhodesia's House of Assembly from 1965 to 1976. He began his political career as a member of the Dominion Party, and served as its chairman from 1960 to 1962. In 1962, he was a founding member of the Rhodesian Front, but switched to the Rhodesian Action Party in 1976. After unsuccessfully running for re-election in 1977, he moved back to the United Kingdom, where he lived until his death.

== Early life and education ==
Hope Hall was born on 5 June 1924 in Bideford, Devon, England, United Kingdom. He was educated at Charterhouse School in Godalming, then he served in the Royal Navy during World War II as a Lieutenant in the Royal Naval Reserve where he was mentioned in Despatches. During the war, he became partially deaf as a result of exposure to gunfire. In 1947, he was demobilised as Senior AA Gunnery Lieutenant on the carrier HMS Hunter. He embarked on his career in merchant banking. In 1948 he got a transfer to Cape Town . In June 1950, he moved to Southern Rhodesia to set up a branch of what was later to be known as UDC in Salisbury.,

== Political career ==
Upon moving to Southern Rhodesia, Hope Hall became involved in business and politics. Initially setting up UDC in Salisbury he moved on to work for Standard Finance. Around the same time he went into partnership with John Smith with Smith & Hall pianos He joined the Dominion Party, and ran unsuccessfully for parliament in 1959. From 1960 to 1962, he chaired Dominion Party, which after 1960 was solely based in Southern Rhodesia, when the party's Northern Rhodesian and Nyasaland branches split off to form the Federal Dominion Party. In March 1962, when the Dominion Party was reconstituted as the Rhodesian Front, Hope Hall was a founding member.

In 1965, the year Rhodesia declared independence from the United Kingdom, Hope Hall won election to the House of Assembly as the Rhodesian Front candidate for the Highlands South constituency. He was reelected in 1970 with 76% of the vote, and again in 1974 with 75% of the vote. On 27 March 1973, he was elected Deputy Speaker of the House of Assembly and Chairman of Committees. He was a member of the parliamentary caucus all through his career and was at the meeting where the PM The Hon. Ian Douglas Smith asked each member on their view of the way forward. Richard agreed the a declaration of Independence was the only way but stipulated that if declared then a national day of prayer be called. This was heartily seconded by Angus Graham (Duke of Montrose). There followed, 'two of the most peaceful years of my life' as he recalled to his son Andrew later.

He was a member of the Police 'C' Reserve throughout his time in Rhodesia and ended as the Commander of the Highlands Police Station C Reserve. His son Mark served in the C Reserve in between call-ups to the army.

In 1977, the Rhodesian parliament was presented with a highly controversial bill that, if passed, would open up some areas of European-designated land to African ownership. The House of Assembly voted on Land Tenure Amendment Bill on 4 March 1977. On a three line whip, Hope Hall and 11 other conservative Rhodesian Front MPs voted against the bill. Nicknamed the Dirty Dozen by the Rhodesian press, Hope Hall and the other MPs left Rhodesian Front and formed the right-wing Rhodesian Action Party. Prime Minister Ian Smith, whose party had now lost its two-thirds majority needed to amend the Constitution responded by dissolving the House of Assembly and scheduling elections earlier than previously planned. In the 1977 general elections, Hope Hall, along with the other Rhodesian Action Party members, lost his seat in parliament. After 1977, Hope Hall never ran for elected office again.

== Later life and death ==
Hope Hall remained in Rhodesia through the Zimbabwe Rhodesia period. In September 1979, six months before Robert Mugabe would become president of the new Zimbabwe government, Hope Hall and his wife left and moved to the United Kingdom, losing most of their possessions. They settled in Tadley, where his wife worked as a nurse at a local hospital.

Hope Hall died on 17 November 2007 at his home in Tadley. He died around mid-day, having gone for his daily hour-long walk earlier that morning. He was survived by his wife, his three sons, and eight grandchildren. He is buried in Tadley, next to his wife, who died in 2015. Their shared tombstone simply says "Rhodesians."

== Personal life ==
Hope Hall was married to Renée Evelyn Tyndale-Biscoe. He met her in the early 1950s in Salisbury (now Harare), where she taught at Girls High School. They were married at the Salisbury Anglican Cathedral on 16 February 1952. After marrying, they bought a home in Salisbury on Wingate Road. They later relocated to Dulwich Road in the Highlands area, the constituency Hope Hall would later represent in Parliament. Together, they had three sons: Robert, Mark, and Andrew. Their sons were educated at St. John's Preparatory School and Falcon College, and all fought in the Rhodesian Bush War, Robert in 4th Bn RR, Mark in the highly successful 3 Indep Company – then 4th Bn RR and Andrew in the BSAP Black Boots. Robert left Rhodesia in 1977, Mark in October 1978 and Andrew leaving Zimbabwe in January 1983. Renée Hope Hall worked at the Rhodesian Front headquarters and managed her husband's political campaigns. Renee also trained Police reservists in First aid and helped out with ambulance driving and WVRS forces canteens.

Hope Hall was an amateur ornithologist and could identify a bird by its song from twenty yards away, despite his partial deafness from the war.

== Awards and honours ==
- Independence Commemorative Decoration

== Electoral history ==
=== Parliamentary elections ===
Highlands South constituency, 1959

- Opponent missing
- Richard Hope Hall (DP)

Highlands South constituency, 1965

- Richard Hope Hall (RF)
- Alan David Butler (RNP)

Highlands South constituency, 1970

- Richard Hope Hall (RF) – 1,133 (76.3%)
- Jeremy Ralph Bushton Broome (CP) – 351 (23.7%)

Highlands South constituency, 1974

- Richard Hope Hall (RF) – 1,299 (75.3%)
- Marcus Patrick Doyle (RP) – 425 (24.7%)

Highlands South constituency, 1977

- John Christie (RF) – 1,266 (76.5%)
- Richard Hope Hall (RAP) – 230 (13.9%)
- David Frank Sutherland (CP) – 158 (9.6%)

Southern Rhodesian Legislative Assembly
Preceded by Alan David Butler	Member of Parliament for Highlands South; 1965 – 1970	Assembly dissolved
House of Assembly of Rhodesia
New constituency	Member of Parliament for Highlands South; 1970 – 1977	Succeeded by John Christie
Preceded by	Deputy Speaker of the House of Assembly; 1973 – 1977	Succeeded by
