= National People's Union (Rhodesia) =

Political party in Rhodesia

- Abbreviation: NPU
- Leader: Gordon Chavunduka
- Founded: 23 June 1969
- Dissolved: c. 1971
- Merger of: United People's Party and Democratic Party
- Ideology: African majority rule Universal suffrage

The National People's Union (NPU) was a predominantly black African political party in Rhodesia from 1969 to about 1971. Formed through the merger of the United People's Party (UPP) and the Democratic Party, it opposed the white minority government of Ian Smith and advocated majority rule and universal suffrage.

== History ==
The NPU was established on 23 June 1969, shortly before the adoption of a new Rhodesian constitution that further restricted African political representation. The UPP had previously formed the official parliamentary opposition, having won 10 of the 15 predominantly black African district seats in the 1965 Rhodesian general election.

Gordon Chavunduka, formerly chairman of the Democratic Party, became president, with former UPP leader Percy Mkudu as vice-president. On 27 August 1969, the party's members of the Legislative Assembly of Rhodesia elected Chad Chipunza to replace Mkudu as Leader of the Opposition. Mkudu subsequently resigned from the parliamentary caucus.

In the 1970 Rhodesian general election, the NPU contested six of the eight directly elected African constituencies, receiving 1,000 votes (23.11%) and winning one seat. Josiah Gondo was elected in Kunyasi with 353 votes against 221 for his Centre Party opponent. The Centre Party won the other seven directly elected African seats. Under the new constitution, the government no longer recognised an official parliamentary opposition.

The NPU ceased operating as a separate party around 1971. Chavunduka, who remained its president until that year, subsequently joined the United African National Council (UANC), established under Abel Muzorewa in December 1971. He became the UANC's secretary-general in 1973.

== Electoral history ==
Election	Votes	Vote share (Note: Percentage of votes cast in the eight directly elected African constituencies, rather than the entire Rhodesian electorate.)	Seats	Elected member
1970	1,000	23.11%	1 / 66	Josiah Gondo (Kunyasi)

== See also ==
- Politics of Rhodesia
- Rhodesian Front
