= Roundhay =

Suburb of Leeds, West Yorkshire, England

Coordinates: 53.831000°N 1.497000°W

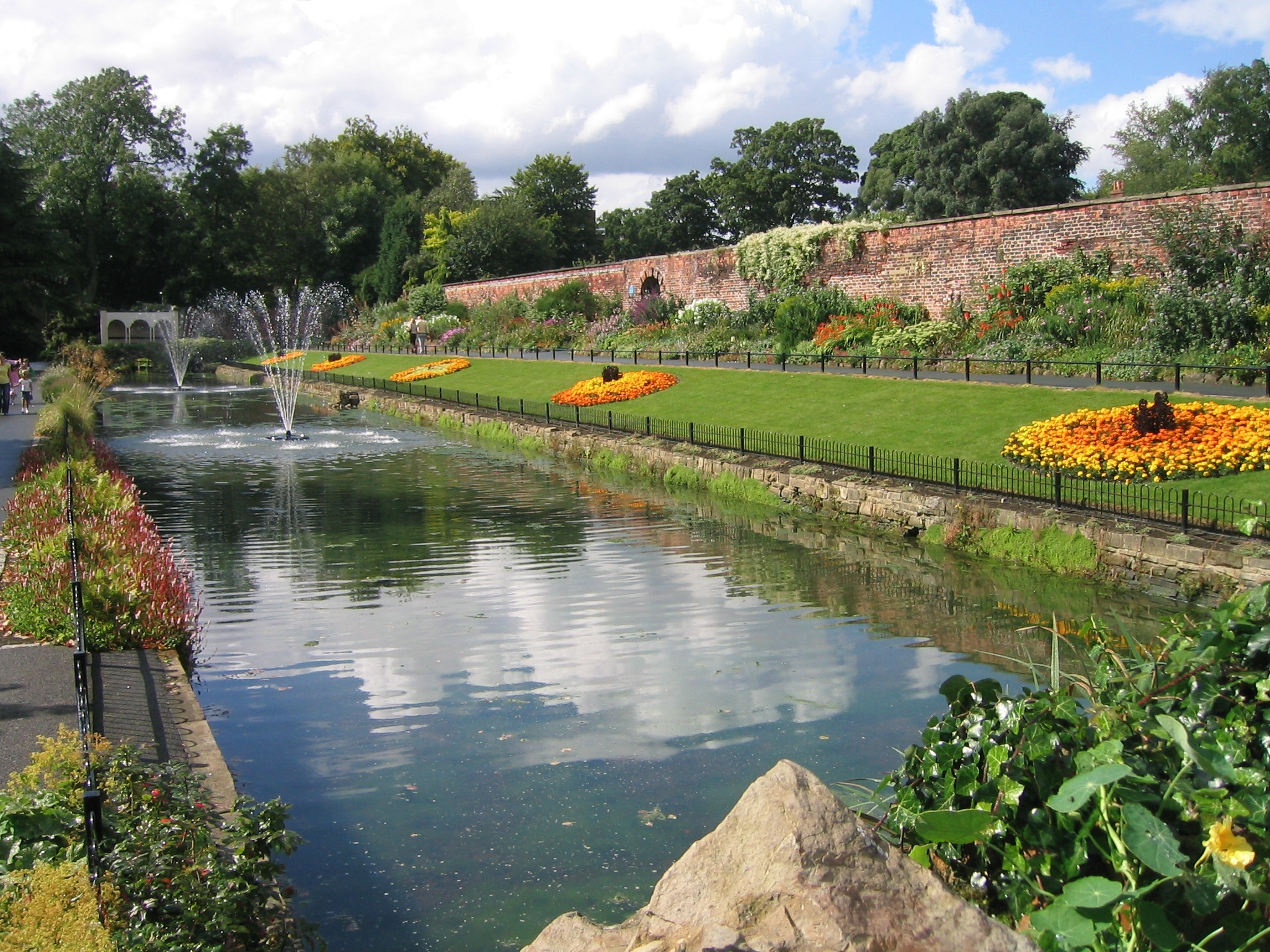
- Canal Gardens, Roundhay Park

- Location within West Yorkshire
- Population: 22,546
- OS grid reference: SE331373
- Metropolitan borough: City of Leeds
- Metropolitan county: West Yorkshire
- Region: Yorkshire and the Humber
- Country: England
- Sovereign state: United Kingdom
- Post town: LEEDS
- Postcode district: LS8
- Dialling code: 0113
- Police: West Yorkshire
- Fire: West Yorkshire
- Ambulance: Yorkshire
- UK Parliament: Leeds North East

Roundhay is a large suburb in north-east Leeds, West Yorkshire, England. Roundhay had a population of 22,546 in 2011.

It sits in the Roundhay ward of Leeds City Council and Leeds North East parliamentary constituency.

== History ==
=== Etymology ===
Roundhay's name derives from Old French rond 'round' and the Old English word (ge)hæg 'enclosure', denoting a round hunting enclosure or deer park. The Roundhay estate map of 1803 showed its circular shape.

=== 12th century ===
Roundhay does not appear in the Domesday Book of 1086, but seems to have been formed soon afterwards, the first mention being in about 1153. It was formerly a hunting park for the De Lacy family of Pontefract Castle. Coal and iron ore were mined and a smelting furnace was recorded in 1295. Once these were exhausted (and woodland had been cleared for fuel) the area turned to farming.

=== 16th century–18th century ===
Roundhay was historically a township and chapelry in the ancient parish of Barwick in Elmet, except for a small area in the east around Roundhay Grange (originally a grange of Kirkstall Abbey), which was a detached part of the township of Shadwell in the parish of Thorner. Roundhay was a hamlet until 1803 when the park estate was bought by Thomas Nicholson who started a programme of landscaping and built the Mansion House. Housing was built for workers and more land sold on which other gentry built houses.

=== 19th century ===
Until 1810, Gipton Wood was Gibton Forest separating Leeds from Roundhay Park and a turnpike road was constructed "from Sheepscar to Roundhay Bridge". After the road was built the population increased from 84 in 1801 to 186 in 1822, mainly in grand houses for wealthier citizens of Leeds.

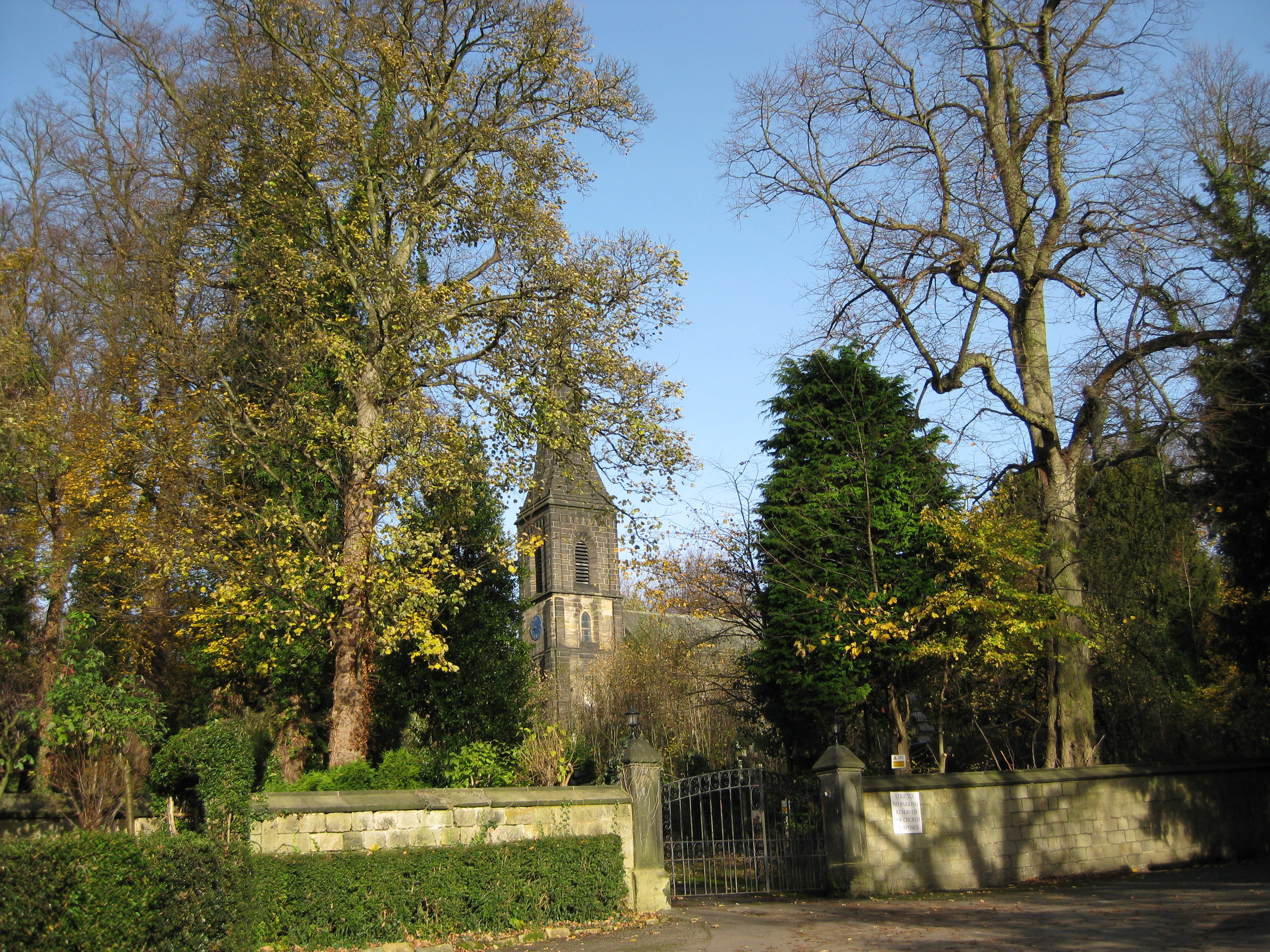
St John's Church (Anglican) 1826

In 1826, St John's Church was established to serve the population of Roundhay, Shadwell and Seacroft, a combined population of about 1100, who would otherwise have had to travel up to three miles to worship. This made the area more attractive, the population rose to 300 in the 1830s in the form of a "township and genteel village" with "elegant villas, walks and plantations".

In 1866, Roundhay and Shadwell both became separate civil parishes.

==== City of Leeds ====
In 1872, Roundhay Park estate was purchased by the City of Leeds and opened as a public park by His Royal Highness Prince Arthur on 19 September 1872. At the time, there was much opposition as many considered the park was too far out of Leeds for the majority of the population to enjoy, and the park had just one access road and led to the park being dubbed a 'white elephant' in its early years.

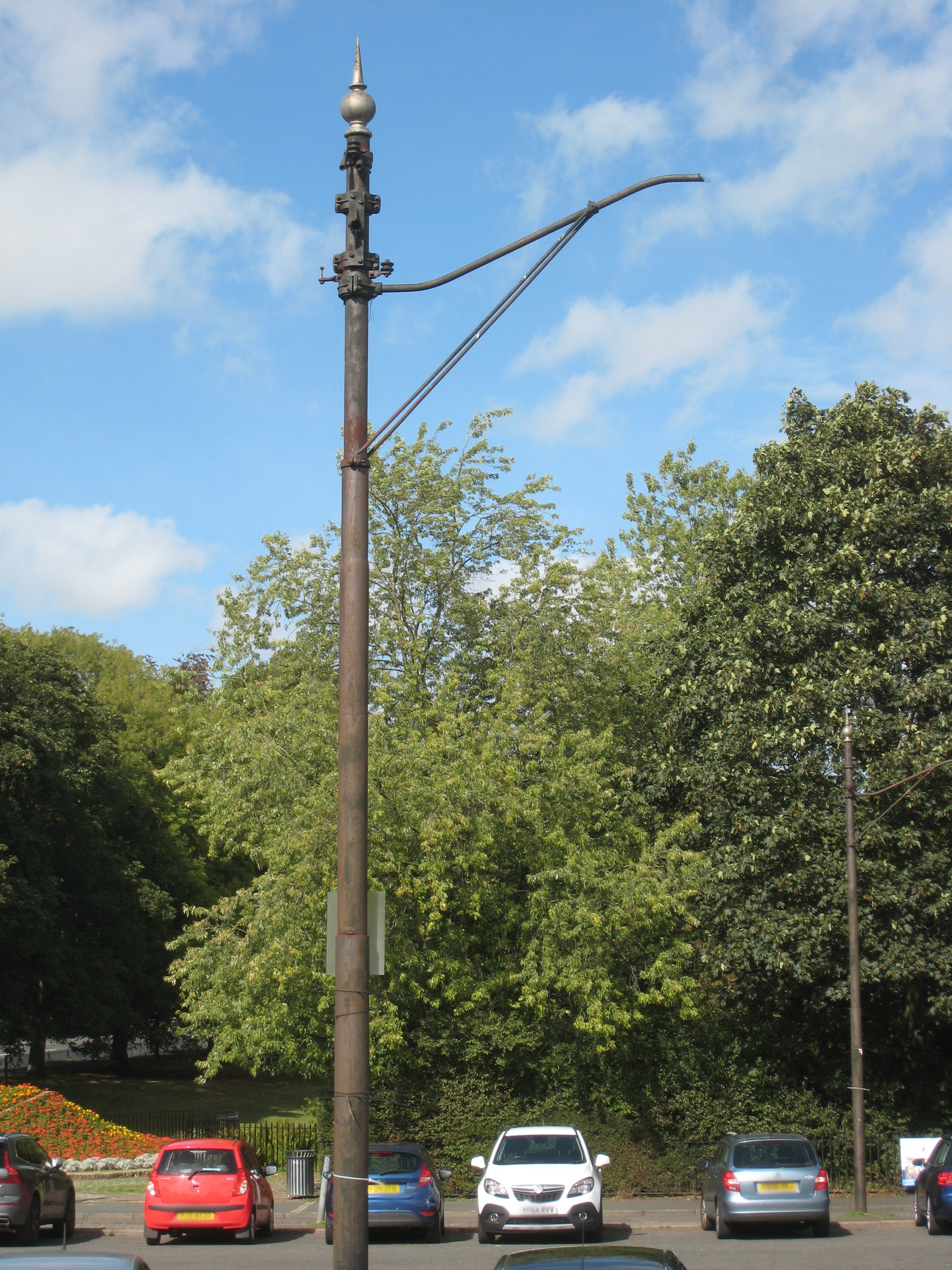
Redundant tram pylons in Roundhay

However, there was interest in developing housing, and a suburb began to develop around Lidgett Park. Development was accelerated in 1884 by the provision of a horse-drawn public omnibus service between Leeds and Roundhay Park, then a horse-drawn tram and, on 11 November 1891, the first public electric tram service, which by 1894 provided a quarter-hourly service from 6 a.m. The city sold surplus land, but placed restrictions in its use, stipulating stone for building and the prohibition of offensive trades.

The area acquired a Post Office in 1868 and by the start of the 20th century some parts were lit by electricity. Brick-built detached and semi-detached housing was created along new roads such as The Avenue.

==== Oldest surviving film ====
On 14 October 1888, Louis le Prince recorded his short film Roundhay Garden Scene in the garden of Oakwood Grange, the home of his parents-in-law, Joseph and Sarah Whitley, (the parents of John Robinson Whitley). This is believed to be the oldest surviving film in existence.

=== 20th century ===
In 1901, a second Anglican Church and in 1902 a Congregational Church were established to provide worship within walking distance for the new working class population. Lidgett Park Wesleyan Church followed in 1906.

Roundhay, looking towards the park in 1963.

==== Lido ====
In June 1907, an open-air swimming pool or 'lido' opened, at a cost of just over £1,600, built mainly by unemployed citizens. During the 1950s and 1960s, about 100,000 people a year visited the Roundhay 'swimming baths'. On 9 November 1912, the civil parishes of Roundhay and Shadwell were abolished, and Roundhay became part of Leeds. In 1911 the parish had a population of 2594.

==== First World War ====
During the First World War, Roundhay was used as a gathering place for soldiers, hence land by Prince's Avenue is known as Soldiers Field. After the war, new estates were built to the south and west of the park. Roundhay School for Boys was opened in 1926, and the School for Girls in 1932. After the Second World War housing filled available spaces, with smaller residences built in the grounds of larger ones, and large converted to flats.

== Country estates ==
=== Roundhay Park Mansion ===
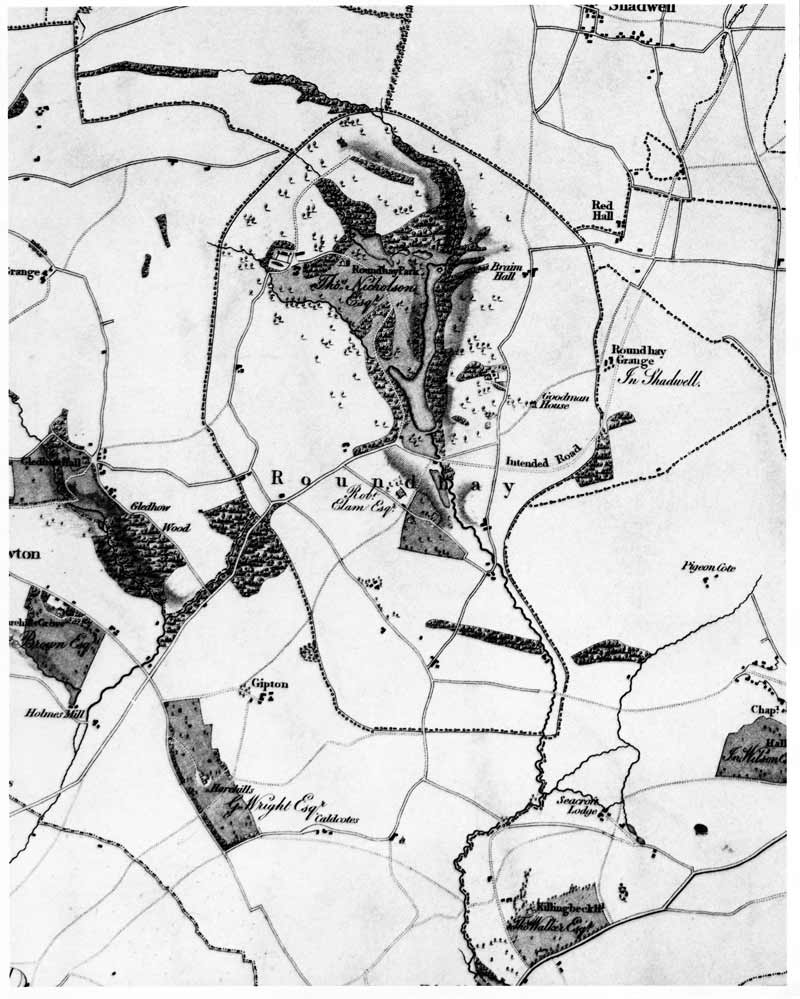
J. Thorp's map of Roundhay, near Leeds c. 1819–21, including Roundhay Park Mansion (c. 1811), its lodge (c. 1815, later Elmete Hall) and nearby Goodman House (later Beechwood, c. 1820)

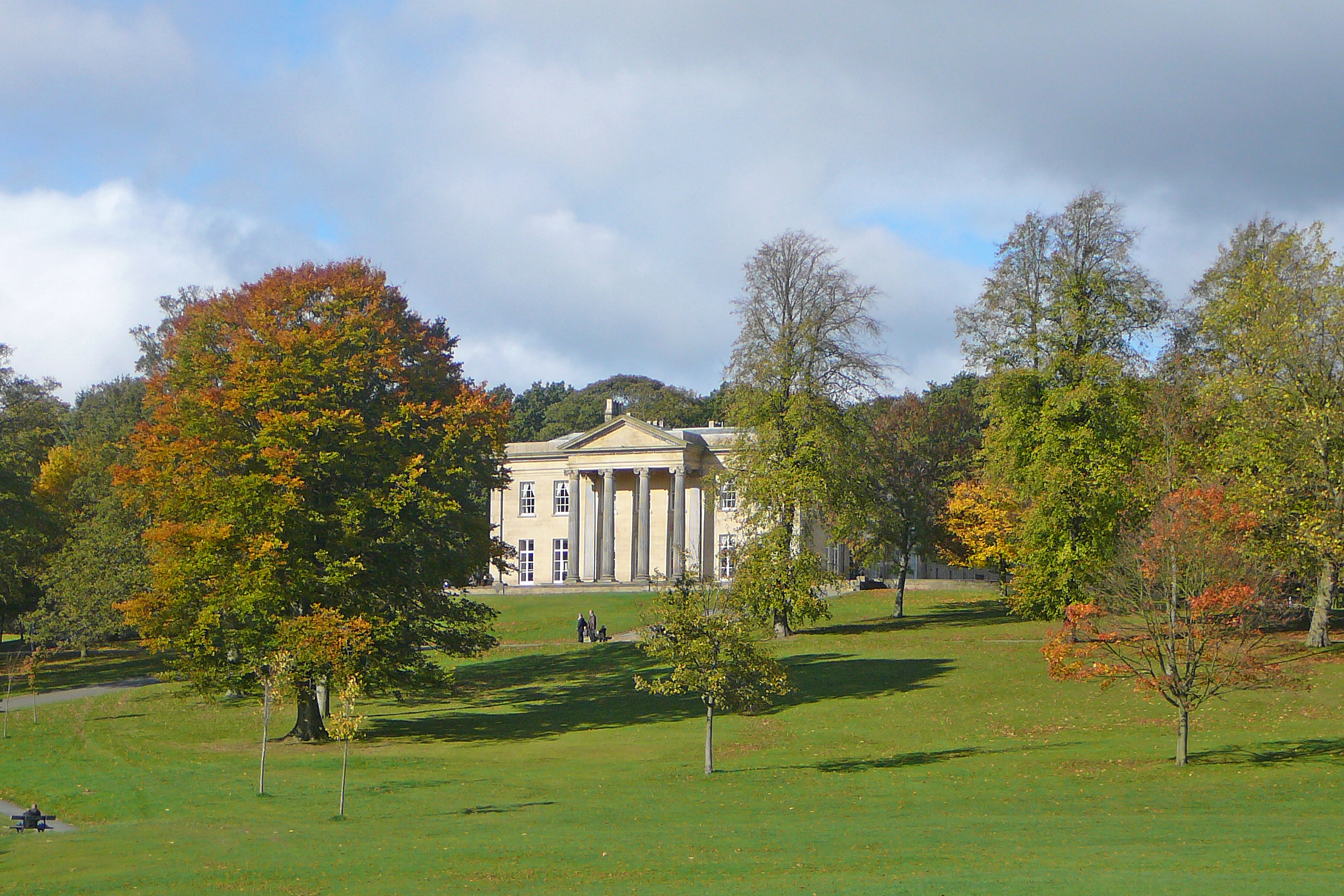
Roundhay Park Mansion, built c. 1811, later known as The Mansion House

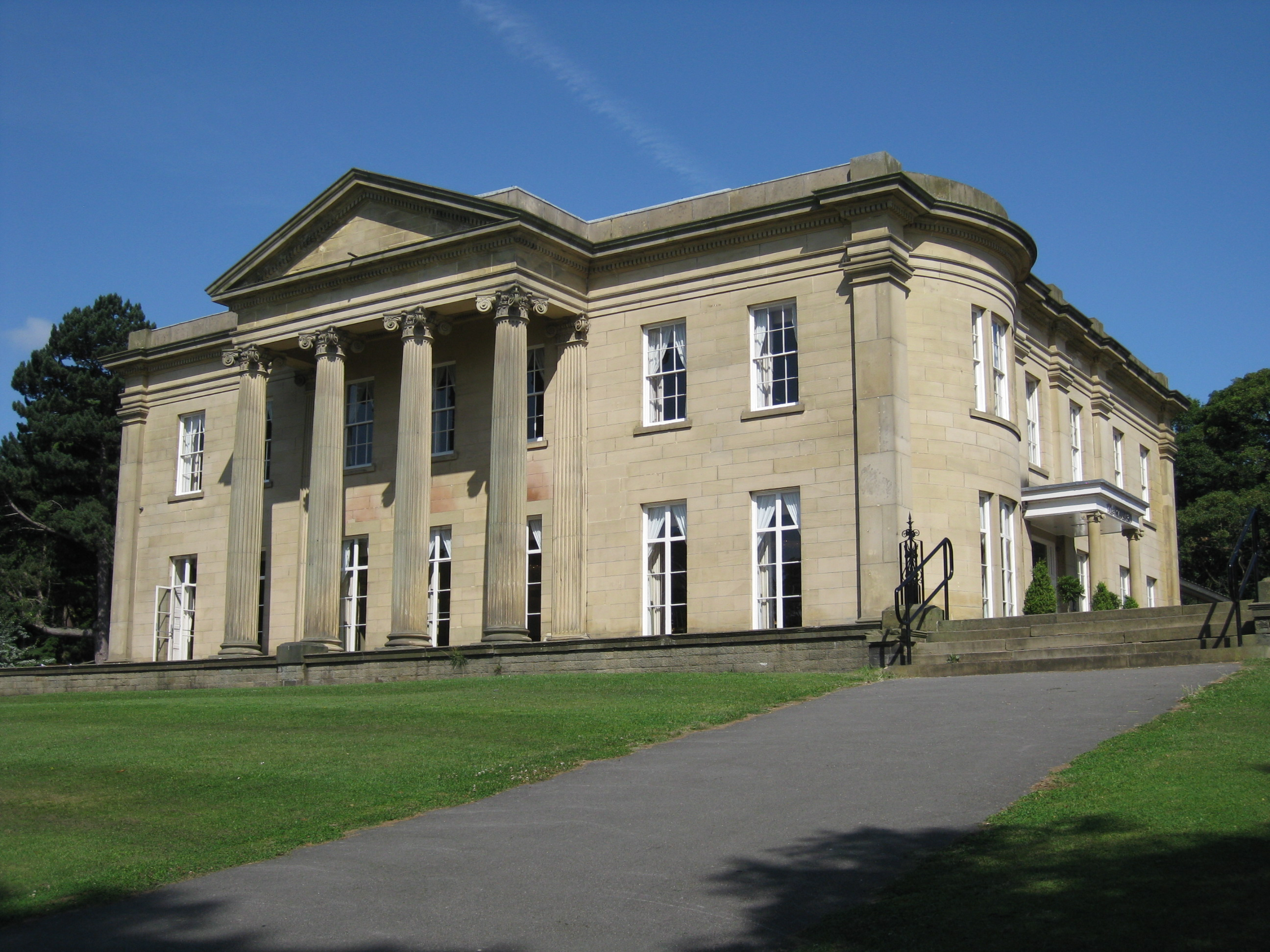
The Mansion House viewed from the park.

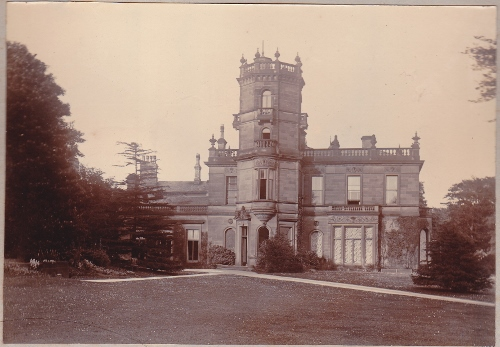
Elmete Hall, first built c. 1815 as Roundhay Lodge

In 1811, John Clarke (died 1857) of York, architect of the Commercial Buildings in Leeds city centre, was commissioned by Thomas Nicholson to design the Mansion House. Formally known as Roundhay Park Mansion, the large mansion was built in ashlar stone in classical Georgian style; of two storeys with seven bays, the centre three set behind an iron portico. Thomas's son, Stephen Nicholson Esq., inherited the house and became the Lord of the manor of Roundhay. Roundhay township's 1,467 acres were recorded in 1842 as being "mostly the property of Stephen Nicholson".

The Mansion House was unused for many years after the departure of catering firm, Gilpin's. Events and catering company 'Dine' was appointed by Leeds City Council to run the Mansion, and in 2009, after refurbishment and gaining a civil ceremony licence, the Mansion re-opened to the public. The venue contains a restaurant and cafe, and hosts private functions.

=== Elmete Hall ===
Like Roundhay Park Mansion (c. 1811), Elmete Hall (1865) and Beechwood (c. 1820) are also Grade II listed and feature in J. Thorp's c. 1819–21 map. Elmete Hall was first built c. 1815 as Roundhay Lodge for the Nicholson family of Roundhay Park Mansion. In 1865, the lodge was rebuilt by architects Charles Roberts Chorley (1829–1912) and John (or Jeremiah) Dobson in the Victorian style for James Kitson (1807–1885). The estate consisted of 65 acres. James Kitson was the father of James Kitson, 1st Baron Airedale and was also a Mayor of Leeds (1860–62) and friend of George Stephenson. Kitson's son, John Hawthorn Kitson (1843–1899) inherited Elmete Hall. It was later bought by Bertram J. Redman, who did further improvements to it as well as planning out an up-to-date garden on the west terrace. For over two decades from 1957, Elmete Hall was used as a school and hostel for the deaf and was renovated in 2007. In 2025, the building houses a number of offices.

=== Beechwood ===
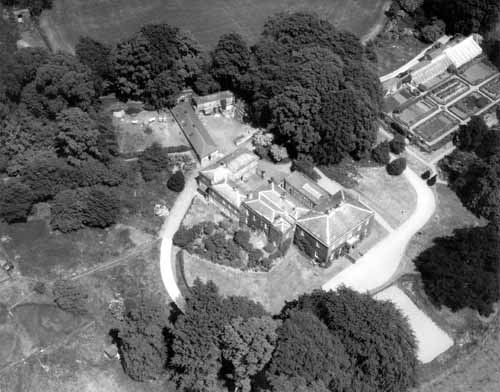
Beechwood Estate, Roundhay, photgraphed by Aerofilms c. 1925

Beechwood was originally known as Goodman House and was built (c. 1820) for Benjamin Goodman (1763–1848) whose son, Sir George Goodman inherited it. It is a late Georgian structure. It was described in 2023 as set in an "attractive parkland setting". Lupton House is a large Victorian wing attached to Beechwood and is named after the Lupton family.

The family of Olive Middleton (née Lupton), the great-grandmother of Catherine, Princess of Wales, acquired the estate after George's death and named it Beechwood. The family owned Beechwood from 1860, selling the mansion itself in 1998. However, in 2023, the great-nephews and niece of Olive Middleton's first cousins, spinster sisters Elinor and Elizabeth Lupton, still owned some of the estate which was originally around 200 acres of farmland. Olive Middleton's unmarried sister, Anne Lupton lived for at time at Beechwood which later became a college for the co-operative movement and then offices. Elinor and Elizabeth Lupton remained at Beechwood until their deaths in the late 1970s, before which they had placed a protective covenant on Asket Hill, part of the estate that they wished to be preserved for nature. The sisters ran a rare breed goat farm at Beechwood and regularly opened their gardens to the public during the 1940s and 50s. Scottish architect George Corson designed a large wing known today as Corson House at Beechwood.

In 1873, Corson won a competition to design a number of substantial villas along Park Avenue – "the jewel in Leed's crown" – and West Avenue on the fringe of Roundhay Park. The villas were built on plots of an acre or more with separate coach houses, stables and servants' quarters at the back so as not to be seen from the park. Woodlands Hall (known originally as Roundhay Mount and later as Carr Head), Parc Mont and several other mansions along Park Avenue are architecturally significant.

== Roundhay Park ==
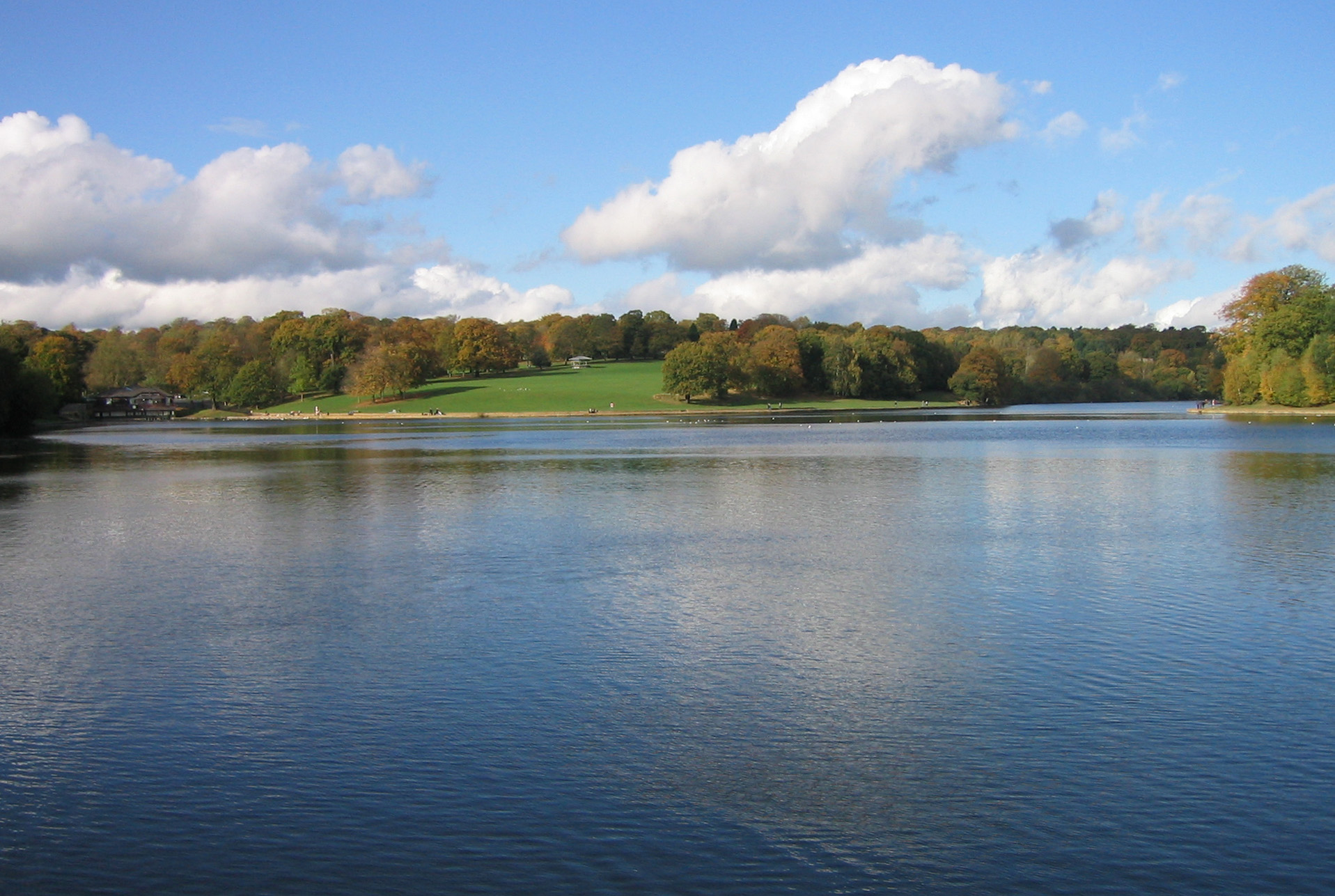
Waterloo Lake, Roundhay Park

Roundhay Park comprises parkland, lakes and woodland. The park has scented gardens for the blind, National Plant Collections, Canal Gardens, the Monet and Alhambra Gardens and Tropical World which attracts visitors all year round. In 2005 the Friends' Garden was opened, alongside Canal Gardens and the Rainbow Garden.

Woodpeckers, common warblers in spring and summer, mute swans, visiting whooper swans, great-crested grebes and herons can be found at the park. The Upper Lake is maintained as a wildlife area, and the larger Waterloo Lake is used for fishing. Roundhay Park provides the venue for special events including sporting events, flower and animal shows, music festivals and a bonfire and firework display on 5 November, (Guy Fawkes Night).

Facilities include tennis courts, skateboard ramps, sports pitches, bowling greens, a sports arena, a golf course and fishing. A cafe overlooking Waterloo Lake was damaged by fire in 2007 but restored and re-opened in 2008.

Roundhay Park was the first location an aircraft landed in Leeds, after a flight from Amsterdam in the Netherlands. The Park late had an aerodrome with one of the earliest air passenger services comprising regular flights every half hour to Bradford. Aircraft were manufactured at the nearby Olympia aircraft works opened by Robert Blackburn in 1914. The aerodrome operated until 1920. The factory continued until the 1960s, the previous factory site now being occupied by a large Tesco supermarket.

Tropical World is located to the west of the park and contains many rare birds and butterflies.

The park has hosted numerous outdoor concerts including Michael Jackson, The Rolling Stones, Bruce Springsteen, U2, Robbie Williams and Ed Sheeran.

== Sport and culture ==
The Leeds Tykes rugby union club was founded after the merger of the Headingley and Roundhay clubs. Roundhegians RFC was the old boys' association of Roundhay School but now operates as a rugby club for the whole of Roundhay. The club plays at Chelwood Drive at the west end of Roundhay, near Moortown. Leeds Golf Club "Cobble Hall" as it is more affectionately known locally is situated on the edge of Roundhay park it has The Leeds Cup – The Oldest Trophy in Professional Golf Worldwide. The famous golf architect Doctor Alastair MacKenzie was a member of Leeds Golf Club between 1900 and 1910. There is also Roundhay Golf Club within Roundhay Park which is reputably designed by Dr MacKenzie and has a restaurant ("Del Verde").

== Amenities ==
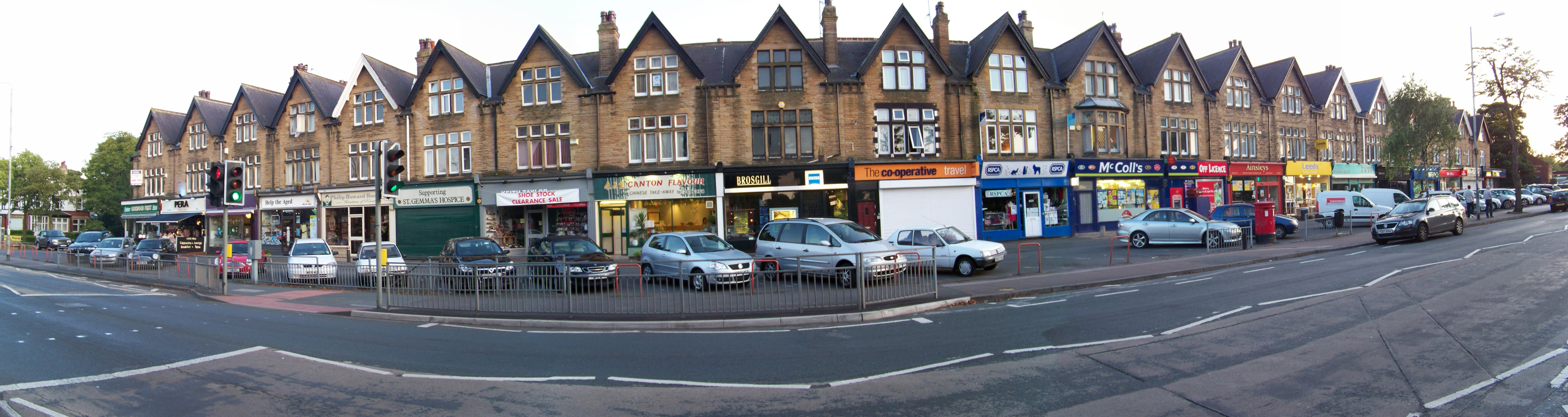
Street Lane

The area is served by First West Yorkshire circular services 2 (via Chapel Allerton) and 12 (via Harehills) from Leeds city centre. These operate at a 10–15 minute frequency during the daytime on weekdays and Saturdays, and 30 minute frequency on evenings. Daytime frequency on Sundays is 30 minutes also. The closest main line rail station is Leeds (approx 4.5 miles (7.2 km)).

== Housing ==
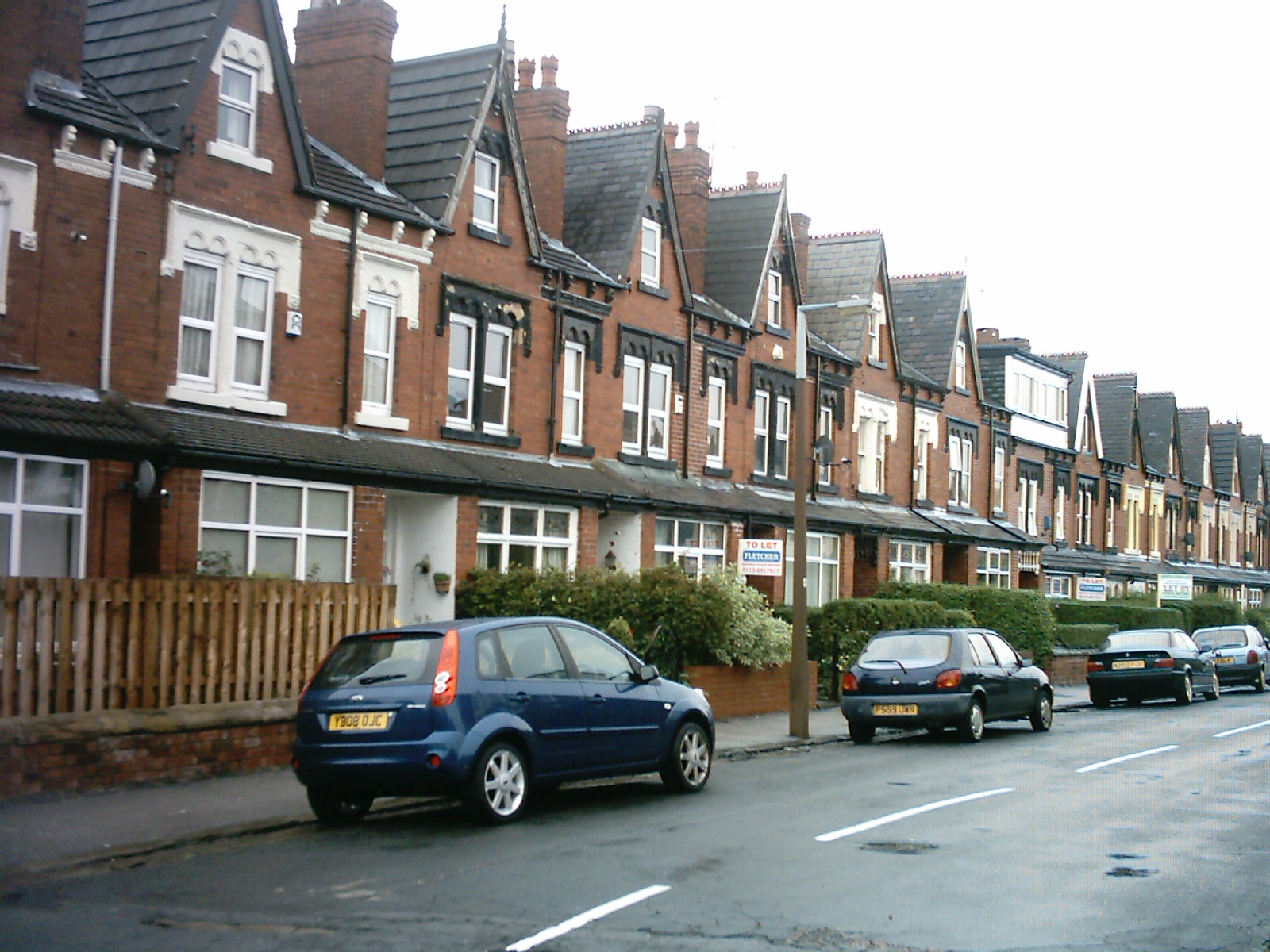
Victorian terrace housing in Roundhay

Roundhay has a wide variety of housing. There is a mixture of Victorian through terraces, villas and 20th-century detached and semi detached housing. Because there has never been any mass house building in Roundhay at any one time, there is no consistent style throughout the area. There are many Victorian villas and flats adjacent to the park and along the northern edge of Roundhay.

== Religion ==
According to the 2011 census 22,546 people were counted, of whom 46.64% gave their religion as Christian, 25.60% as No religion, 7.40% religion not stated, 12.58% Muslim, 1.89% Jewish, 3.40% Sikh, 1.78% Hindu, 0.34% Buddhist, 0.35% Others.

The first post-Reformation Catholic church in Leeds was the Roundhay Mission.

The Rev. Thomas Davis, a Church of England hymn-writer, was Vicar of Roundhay in the mid 19th century.

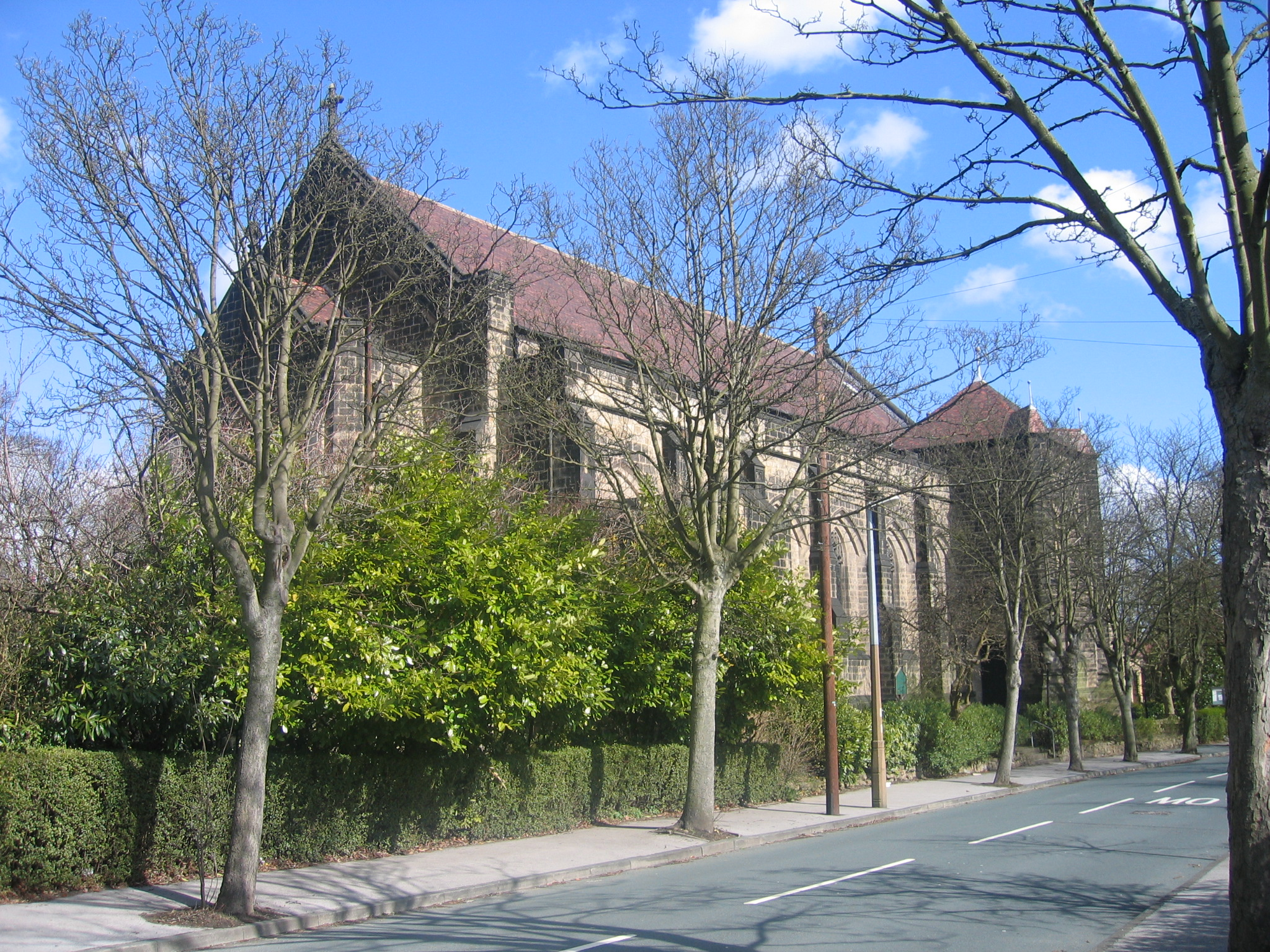
St Edmund's Parish Church, junction of Lidgett Park Road and North Park Avenue, Anglican

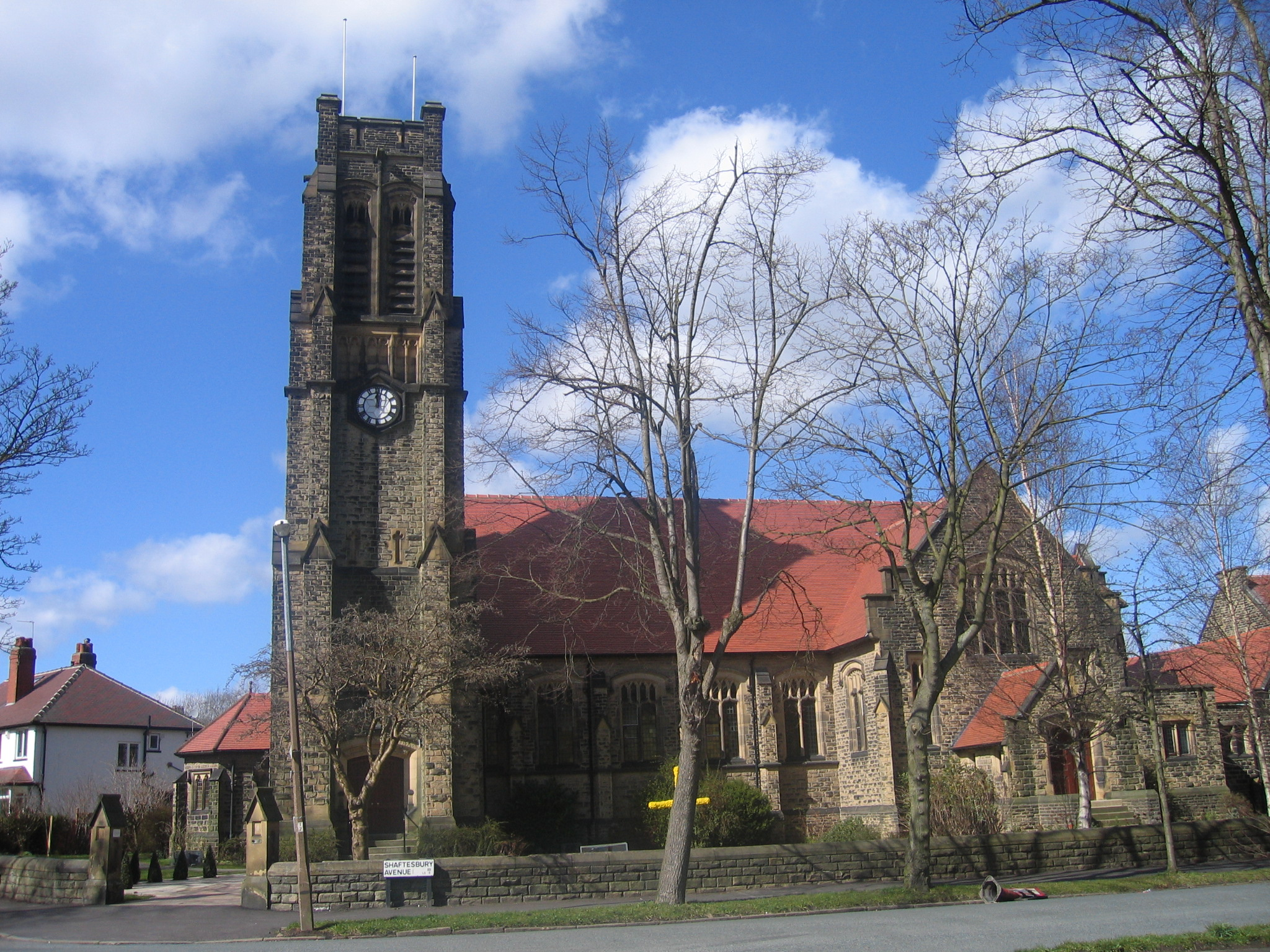
St Andrew's Church, Devonshire Crescent, United Reformed

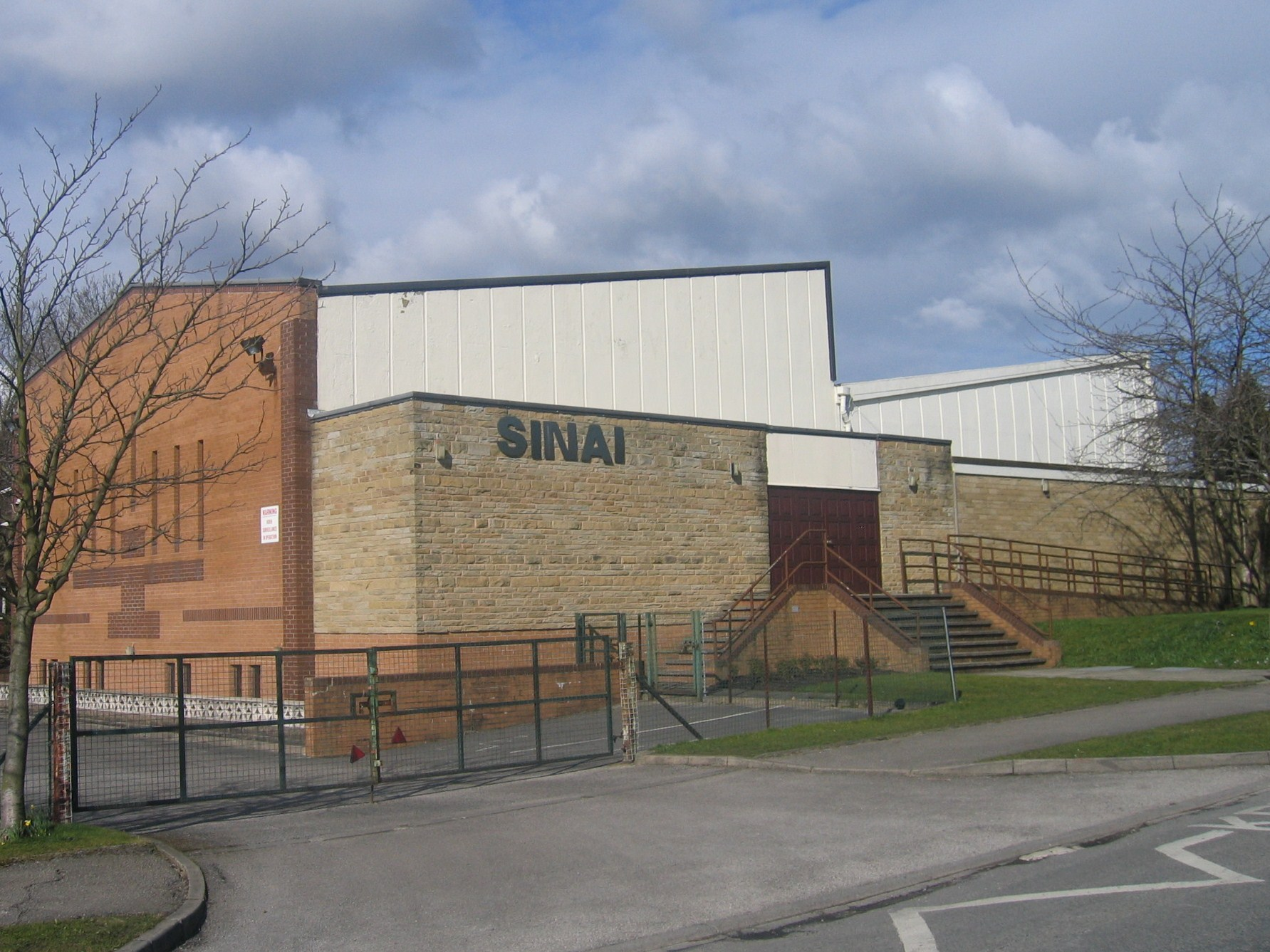
Sinai Synagogue, Roman Avenue

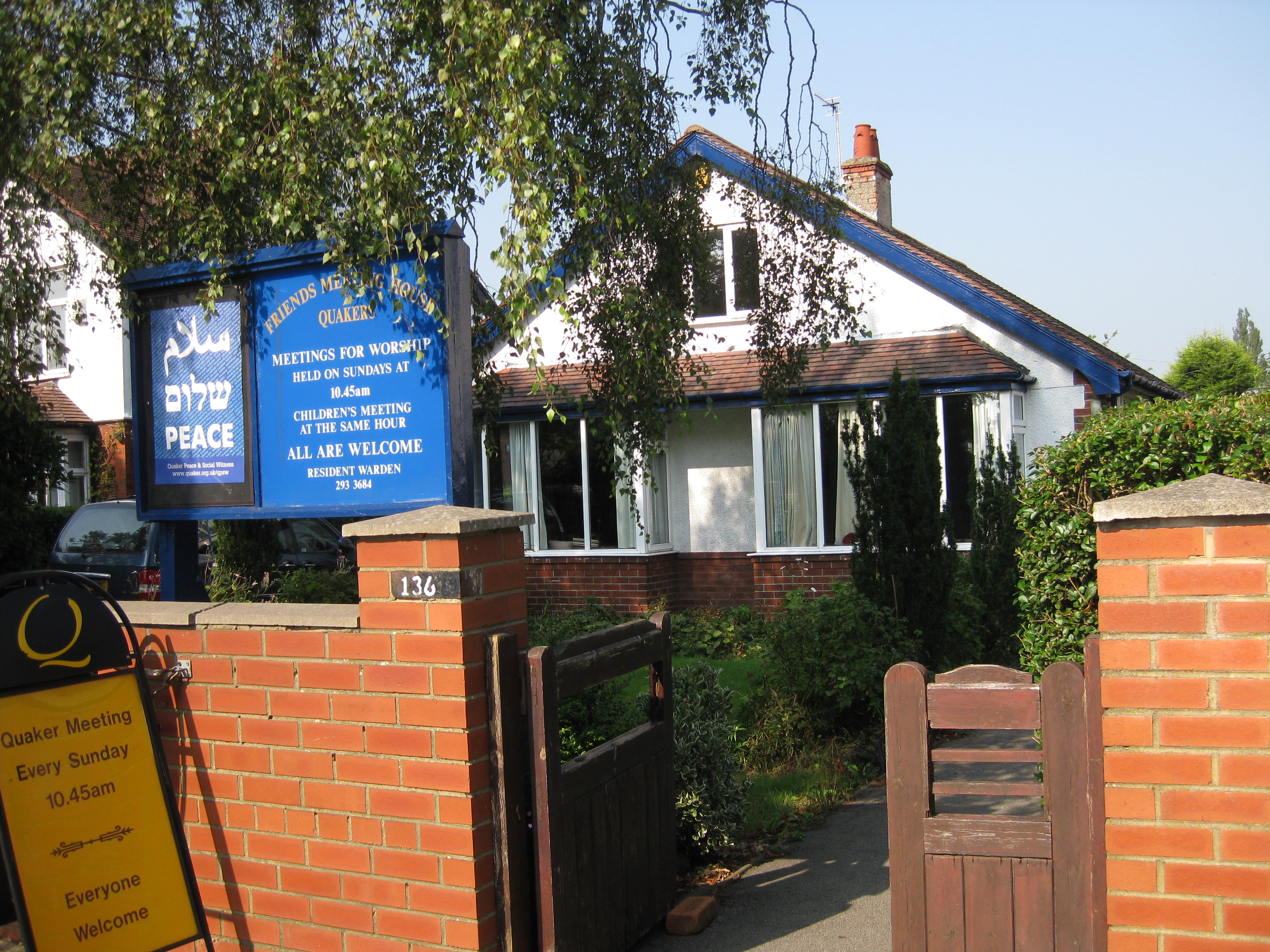
Quaker Meeting House, Street Lane
- All Nations Community Church
- St Johns CE Church (Closed June 2008)
- St Edmunds CE Church
- Lidgett Park Methodist Church
- Oakwood Church (joint Methodist and Anglican)
- St Andrew's United Reformed Church
- Roundhay Evangelical Church
- Society of Friends (Quakers)
- Sinai Synagogue

== Education ==
- Allerton Grange High School
- Roundhay School
- Gledhow Primary School
- Talbot Primary School
- Kerr Mackie Primary School
- St. John's Church of England Primary School, Roundhay

== Notable people ==
- Field Marshal William Nicholson, 1st Baron Nicholson (1845–1918), soldier, was born at Roundhay Park, and took his peerage title from Roundhay.
- Jimmy Savile, media figure and predatory sex offender, lived in a penthouse apartment at Lake View Court, Roundhay for 30 years until his death in 2011.

== See also ==
- Listed buildings in Leeds (Roundhay Ward)
