= Alan Samuel Butler =

British aviator (1898–1987)

Alan Butler (22 November 1898 – 24 May 1987), born as Alan Samuel Butler, was a British aviator and, as claimed in his obituary in The Times, the first private aeroplane owner-driver. Since 1923 Butler was chairman of De Havilland Aircraft Company, which he financed, until 1950, a year when De Havilland employed 20,000 people and was building the Comet, the world's first commercial jet airliner.

He was born in Gloucestershire near Bristol in 1898 to Marion (née Cochran) and Samuel Butler, a prosperous merchant in Bristol and inventor holding a number of patents. His father died in July 1906 leaving 7-year old Alan wealthy. His Scottish-born mother remarried in 1913 when Alan was at Eton.

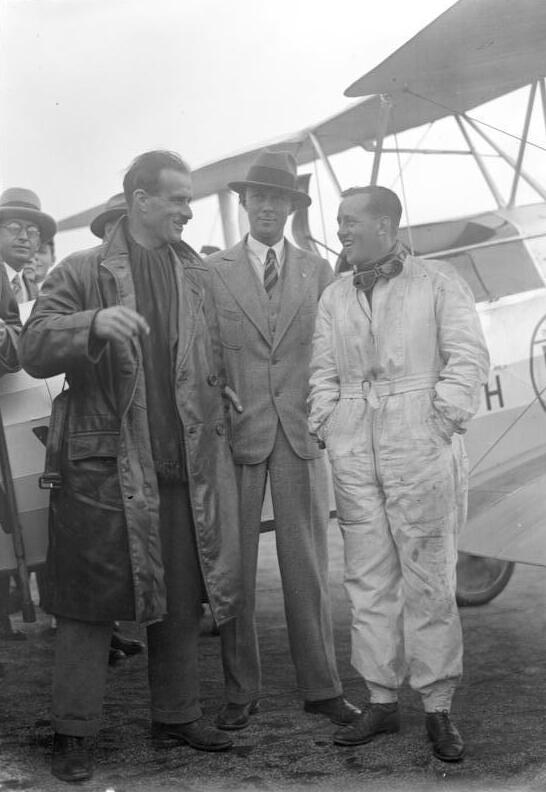
Europa Rundflug 1930 Alan Butler and his co-pilot Hubert Broad in Berlin-Tempelhof

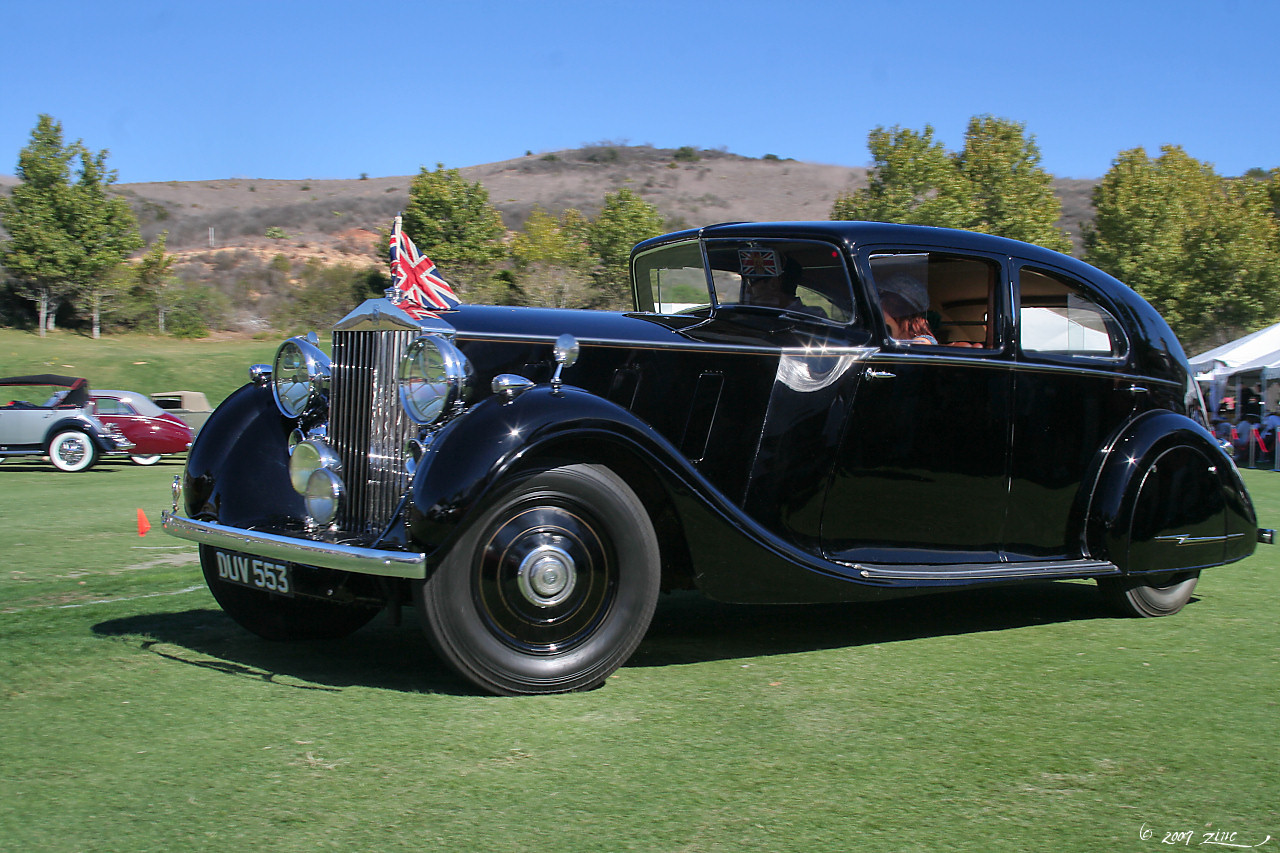
Butler's personal Phantom III Rolls-Royce. It was believed its special windscreen might prove aerodynamic

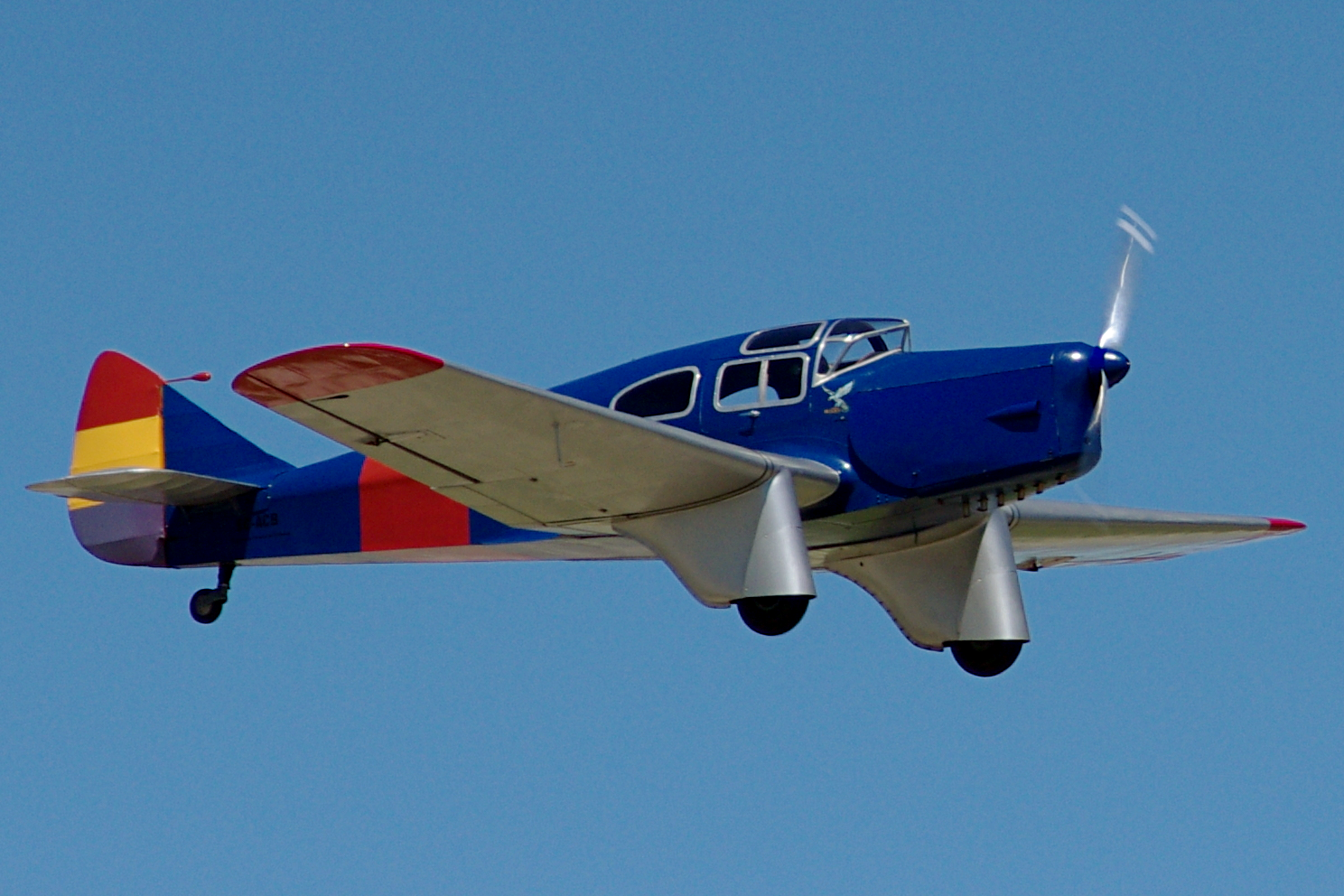
The same shape of windscreen on an aircraft of the same period

Always an enthusiast for flying, he finished school during the First World War. However he was sent straight from school to the military college at Sandhurst and on graduation to the Coldstream Guards arriving in France just after the Armistice. He was stationed on Wimbledon Common in 1919 and so he was able to learn to fly at the school run by Colonel G L P Henderson at Hounslow. There he trained in Mono Avros. When free of his wartime commitments Butler bought his own aircraft and moved to Newfoundland where he made his own air-survey business later Aerofilms Limited owned by Aircraft Operating Company.

In 1921 Butler asked Geoffrey de Havilland to build him an aircraft to Butler's own specification. This new aircraft was the first DH37A and Butler named it Sylvia after his sister. Pleased with the aeroplane and impressed by the De Havilland company staff he lent his financial support to the new venture and took the chair of the De Havilland Aircraft Company and held it from 1923 until 1950.

In 1925 Butler married Lois Knox-Niven (née Reid) and they had two children, a daughter Carol and a son David.

He toured Europe in his new aircraft in 1923, the first English private owner to do so, before leaving for Labrador seeking a new Klondike. Butler owned a series of De Havilland aircraft which he raced as well as establishing some world records. In 1930 both he and his Canadian-born wife, Lois, competed in the Europa Rundflug, a 7,000 mile race around Europe. They piloted different aircraft, Butler's being a DH-60G. Butler won but was disqualified on a technical point. Lois Butler was one of the earliest women pilots appointed to the Air Transport Auxiliary during the Second World War.

When he left De Havilland in 1950 there were 20,000 employees. His colleagues described him as "conscientious to a degree and outspoken almost to a fault."

Butler also had a 250-ton ketch also called Sylvia and made regular trans-Atlantic voyages in her. Sylvia was fitted with a complete refrigeration plant.

He was active in South Bedfordshire's local affairs, serving many years as a JP, and continued to fly until he was 75. His wife, Lois, died in 1970 and his son David, a third generation yachtsman, in a road accident in 1972. In 1973, he was awarded the Gold Medal of the Royal Aero Club.

Alan Butler died aged 88. He was survived by his daughter Carol Horton.
