= Lois Butler =

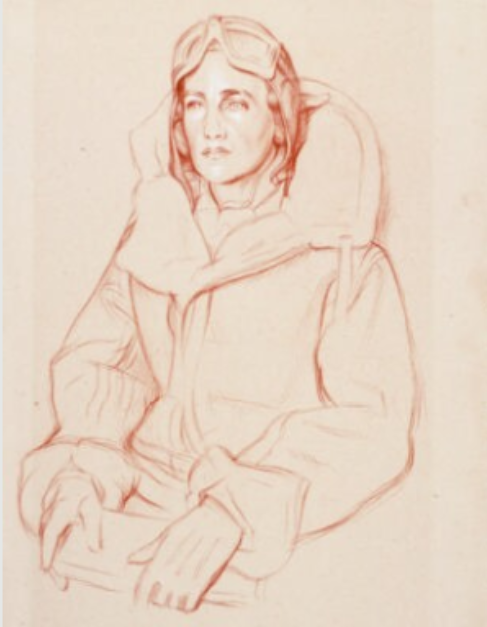
- Born: Lois Reid; 3 November 1897; Montreal, Quebec, Canada
- Died: 17 August 1970 (aged 72); Piraeus, Greece
- Resting place: St Mary's Church, Studham
- Education: Havergal College, Toronto
- Occupation: Aviator
- Employer: Air Transport Auxiliary
- Spouses: Lieutenant-Colonel Hugh William Knox-Niven (m. 1918–1923) Alan Samuel Butler, chairman of the de Havilland Aircraft Company (m. 1925)
- Children: Lois Knox-Niven (wife of Michael Ventris), Alan David Butler and Carol Horton

Lois Butler (born Lois Reid 3 November 1897 – 17 August 1970) was an Olympic skier, aviator and one of the early members of the Air Transport Auxiliary (ATA).

== Early life ==
Lois Reid was born on 3 November 1897 in Montreal, Quebec, to Minnie (née Cormack) (d. 1949) and Sir William Duff Reid (1866–1924). She was their only daughter and had four brothers. Her father owned railways in Canada and was president of the Reid Newfoundland Co. Ltd.

Reid was educated at Abbots Langley School in Britain and returned to Canada in 1913 to attend Havergal College in Toronto.

She met her first husband, Lieutenant-Colonel Hugh William Knox-Niven, when he was working as aide-de-camp to the governor of Newfoundland. They married in 1918 and had one daughter, Lois Knox-Niven. Hugh Knox-Niven died in 1923.

She and her second husband, Alan Samuel Butler, chairman of the De Havilland Aircraft Company, married in 1925 and had two children, a daughter, Carol and a son, David.

== Skiing ==
Butler was a skier and she represented Canada at the 1936 Winter Olympics in Garmisch-Partenkirchen, captaining the women's team and competing in the women's combined event.

== Flying and the ATA ==
Together the Butlers set a world record for two-seater light planes, of 119.77 m.p.h. in 1928.

Butler was one of the earliest women pilots appointed to the Air Transport Auxiliary (ATA) in 1940 by the Commandant Pauline Gower. By the end of the war, she had more than 1000 flying hours and had flown 36 types of aircraft, and was one of the most experienced service pilots.

After the war the family moved to Salisbury, (now Harare) in what was then called Southern Rhodesia (now Zimbabwe). They bought tobacco farms near Bulawayo, but the couple later returned to Studham Hall, in Bedfordshire, leaving their son, David, to run the business.

Butler died of a heart attack, in Piraeus, Greece, on 17 August 1970. She was buried in St Mary's Church, Studham, in Bedfordshire.
