= Gloster Survey =

A.S.31 Survey
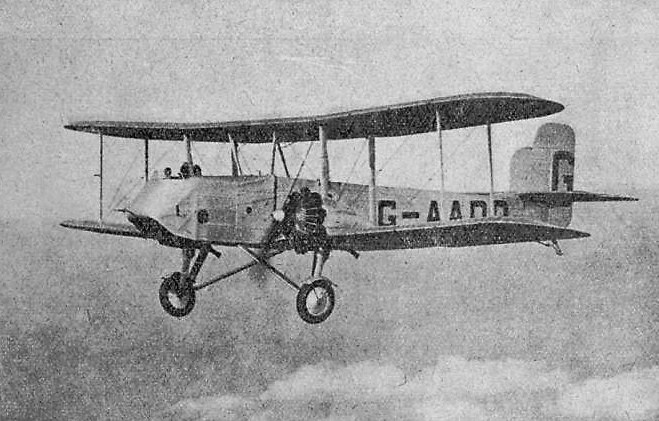

General information
- Type: Photo-survey biplane
- National origin: United Kingdom
- Manufacturer: Gloster Aircraft Company
- Primary users: Aircraft Operating Company South African Air Force
- Number built: 2

History
- First flight: 1929

The Gloster A.S.31 Survey was a 1920s British photo-survey biplane developed by the Gloster Aircraft Company from the de Havilland DH.67 design project.

== Background ==
In 1926, the Aircraft Operating Company, an official contractor to the British Ordnance Survey for aerial survey work overseas, required a replacement for the converted Airco DH.9s that formed the majority of its fleet.

The requirements included maximum reliability, all-metal construction so that it could operate in the tropics or the arctic, a preference that it could be broken down into parts for transport. It should be able to maintain height at 9,000 ft on a single engine while fully laden.

It approached the de Havilland Aircraft Company which prepared a design for a twin-engined biplane of metal construction, resembling a smaller version of the de Havilland Hercules to meet the specification, designated de Havilland DH.67. However, de Havilland was busy with production of the Hercules and DH.60 Moth and in November 1928 it transferred the project to Gloster Aircraft Company.

The customers requirement was for an aircraft that could be converted to a seaplane and capable of surveying large areas while operating from a single base. Under Folland, Gloster comprehensively redesigned the aircraft with changes in all dimensions and for its own construction methods, the resulting aircraft being designated as Gloster AS.31 Survey.

== Design and development ==
The Gloster Survey was a twin-engined biplane with a conventional landing gear and an open cockpit for two pilots, while a camera operator and survey camera could be accommodated in the enclosed cabin. The entirety of the front portion of the floor of the aircraft was glazed, so that three cameras could be installed.

It was powered by two 525 hp (392 kW) Bristol Jupiter XI engines, mounted on top of each lower wing. Provision was made in the design to take alternative engines including the Armstrong Siddeley Jaguar, Pratt & Whitney Hornet, Lorraine-Dietrich 14Asc and Wright Cyclone.

== Operational history ==
In June 1929, the prototype Survey (G-AADO) made its first flight. It was handed over to the Aircraft Operating Company on 25 January 1930 on an occasion patronised by the Secretary (Lord Thomson) and Under-secretary for Air. It had the ability to fly effectively on the power of one engine alone. On 20 March 1930, piloted by Alan S. Butler, it departed from Heston Aerodrome for a survey of Northern Rhodesia, covering the 7,000 miles at an average speed of 128 mph. On 11 April 1930 it reached Cape Town. During 1931, it successfully surveyed 63,000 square miles (160,000 km^{2}).

It was used for further surveys over the next few years, not requiring replacement of any major components in 500 flying hours. In March 1935, it was sold to the South African Air Force and operated for aerial photography until it was broken up at Waterkloof in December 1942.

A second Gloster Survey (K2602) was built for the British Air Ministry, and in November 1931, it was delivered to the Royal Aircraft Establishment at Farnborough. It was employed for radio experiments, and remained in use until 1936.

Gloster received interest from Egypt for a bomber reconnaissance version to Egypt and quoted £11,000 per aircraft, but no order was placed.

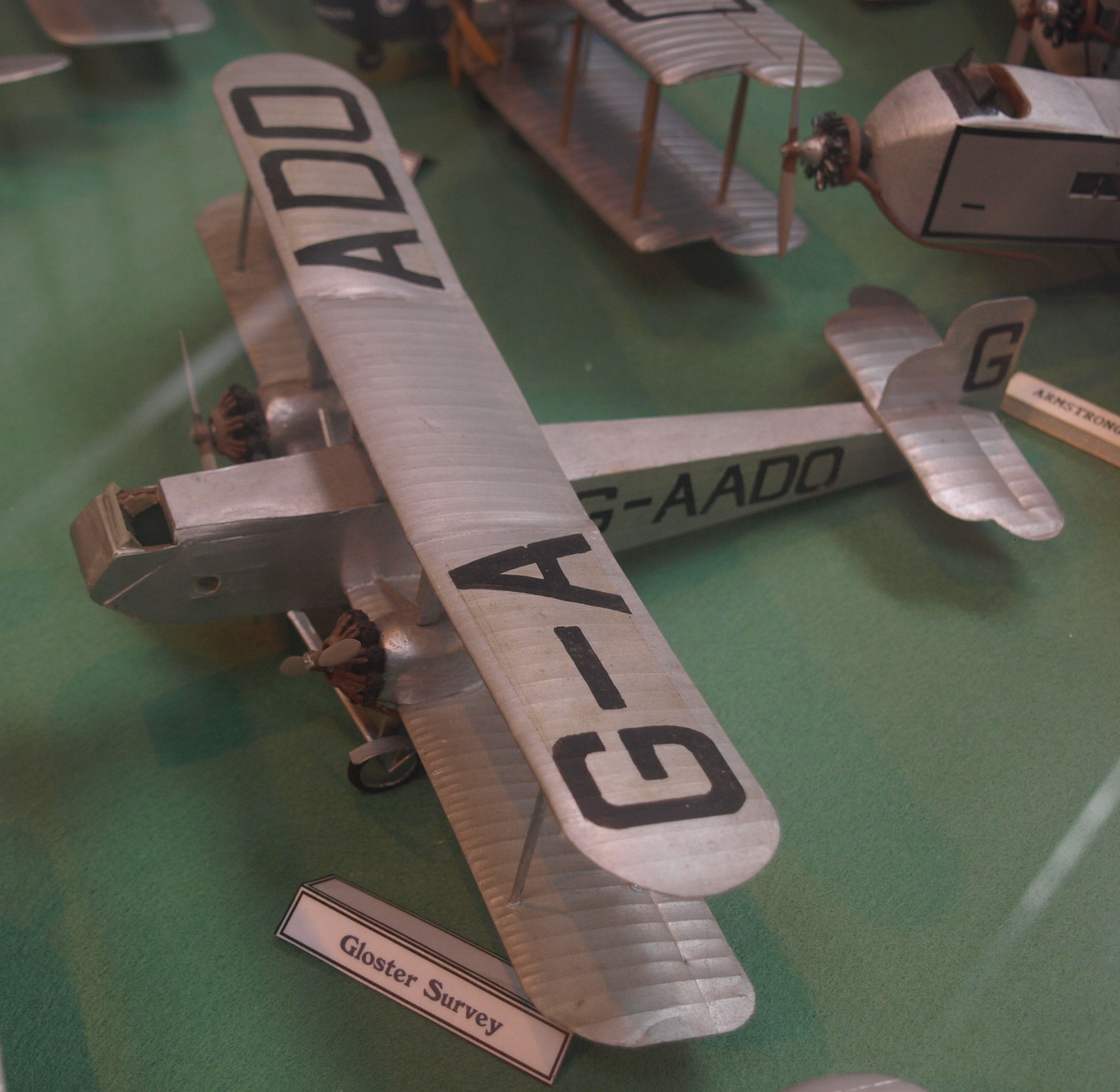
Model of a Gloster Survey

== Operators ==
South Africa

- South African Air Force

United Kingdom

- Aircraft Operating Company
- Royal Aircraft Establishment

== Specifications ==
Data from Gloster Aircraft since 1917

General characteristics

- Crew: three (two pilots, one camera operator)
- Capacity: 800 lb survey equipment
- Length: 48 ft 6 in (14.79 m)
- Wingspan: 61 ft 0 in (18.60 m)
- Height: 18 ft 9 in (5.72 m)
- Wing area: 1,025 sq ft (95.3 m^{2})
- Empty weight: 5,614 lb (2,552 kg)
- Gross weight: 8,570 lb (3,895 kg)
- Powerplant: 2 × Bristol Jupiter XI geared air-cooled radials , 525 hp (392 kW) each

Performance

- Maximum speed: 131 mph (211 km/h, 114 kn)
- Cruise speed: 110 mph (177 km/h, 96 kn)
- Range: 495 mi (797 km, 430 nmi)
- Endurance: 4.5–5.75 hours
- Service ceiling: 21,900 ft (6,680 m)

== See also ==
Related lists

- List of aircraft of the South African Air Force
