= Gibson Energy =

Oil and gas industry supply company based in Calgary, Canada

Gibson Energy Inc.
- Type: Public (TSX: GEI)
- Industry: Oil and gas
- Founded: 1953
- Headquarters: Calgary, Alberta, Canada
- Areas served: Canada and the United States
- Key people: James M. Estey, Chairman; Curtis Philippon, CEO
- Revenue: C$5,592 million (2015)
- Net income: (C$280,7 million) (loss) (2015)
- Total assets: C$3,283 million (2015)
- Total equity: C$1,167 million (2015)
- Website: www.gibsonenergy.com
- Footnotes; Financials from Annual Report

Gibsons is a Canada-based midstream oilfield service company. Its assets include pipelines, oil storage facilities, as well as a refinery in Moose Jaw. It is listed on the Toronto Stock Exchange.

== History ==
Gibsons was founded with the incorporation of its predecessor in 1953. It was initially a subsidiary of Hunting plc, a British firm in the same business. Gibsons was sold by Hunting plc to an energy industry focused private equity fund managed by Riverstone Holdings in December 2008, for C$1.2 billion. It was later listed on the Toronto Stock Exchange on June 14, 2011.

In 2012, Gibson bought Omni Energy Services for $445 million. OMNI was an environmental services provider to the American oil and gas industry.

In 2016, Gibsons Energy rejected a $2.8 billion acquisition proposal from a Singapore private equity firm. In 2017, it sold its industrial propane distribution business, Canwest Propane, to Superior Plus for $412 million. In 2017, its largest shareholder called for the company to sell its non-core assets, and consider selling the whole company.

== Current operations ==
Gibsons has facilities in locations in both the United States and Canada. It owns and operates a refinery in Moose Jaw that is Western Canada's largest supplier of the asphalt used for making roofing shingles. It also runs a number of oil storage terminals, the largest of which is the Hardisty Terminal in Hardisty, Alberta.

Gibsons used to run a trucking service to haul petroleum and other products from and to oil and gas production facilities. The majority of the trucks were leased to independent contractor, who paid upwards of $200 a day for equipment that was supposed to be lease purchased. This has been sold to Trimac. The company also buys, sells, and markets oil and gas on the wholesale market.

== See also ==
- List of oilfield service companies
