= Christopher Bevan =

Rhodesian sailor (born 1937)

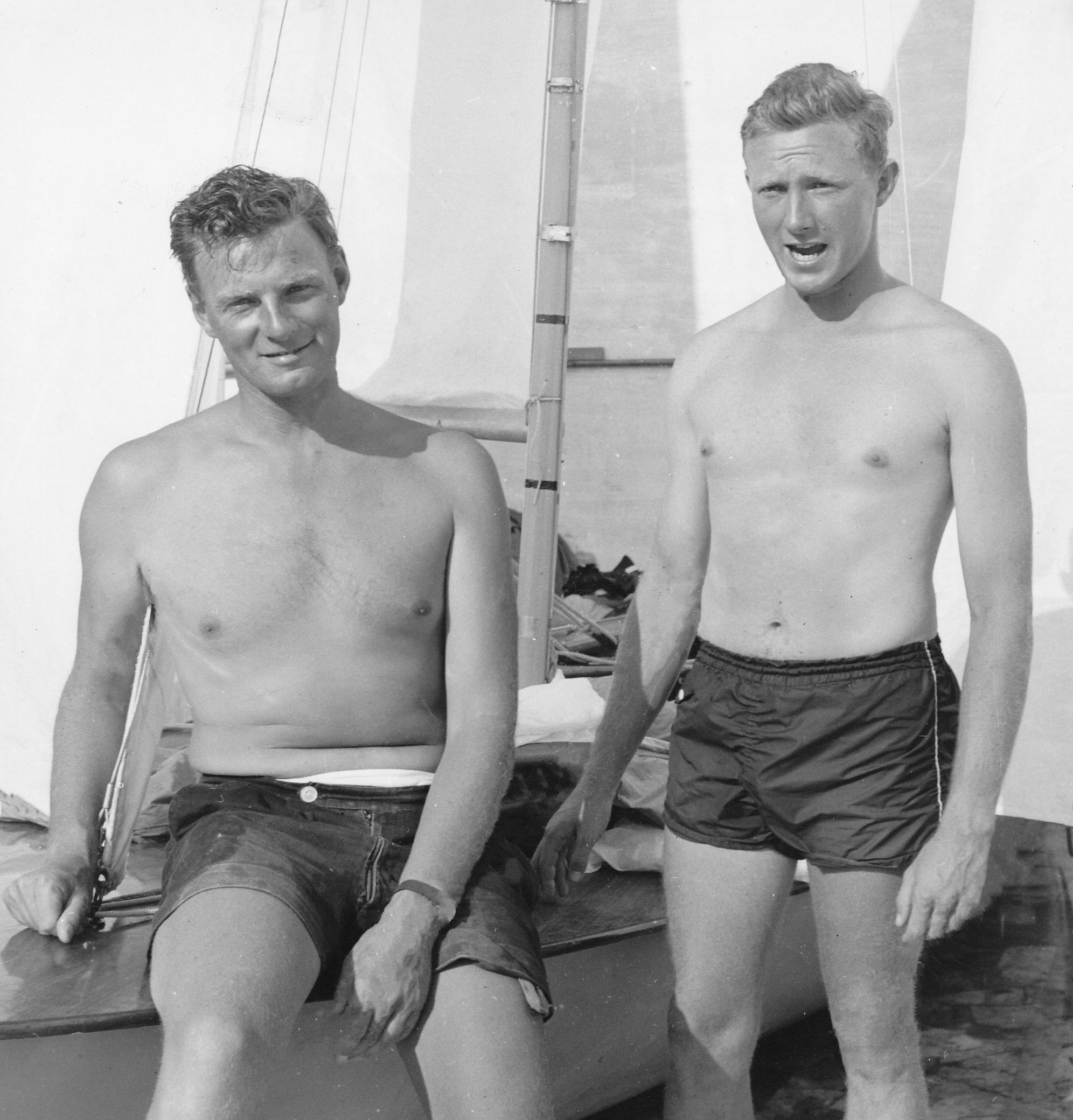
- Alan David Butler and Christopher Bevan (right) at the 1960 Olympics

Personal information
- Born: 9 April 1937 (age 89) London, United Kingdom
- Height: 1.80 m (5 ft 11 in)
- Weight: 75 kg (165 lb)

Sport
- Sport: Sailing

Christopher Bevan (born 9 April 1937) is a retired Rhodesian sailor. He competed at the 1960 Summer Olympics in the "Flying Dutchman" event, paired with Alan David Butler, and finished in fourth place.
