= Josiah Gondo =

Rhodesian politician (died 1972)

Leader of the Opposition in Rhodesia
- In office May 1965 – 25 March 1966
- Preceded by: David Butler
- Succeeded by: Chad Chipunza
- In office 1966 – 21 January 1967
- Preceded by: Chad Chipunza
- Succeeded by: Percy Mkudu

Member of the House of Assembly of Rhodesia for Kunyasi
- In office 1970 – 27 October 1972
- Preceded by: New constituency
- Succeeded by: Thomas Zawaira

Member of the Southern Rhodesian Legislative Assembly for Ndanga
- In office 1962–1970
- Preceded by: New constituency
- Succeeded by: Assembly dissolved

Personal details
- Born: Josiah Moses Gondo
- Died: 27 October 1972
- Party: United Federal Party; United People's Party; National Peoples' Union

Josiah Moses Gondo (died 27 October 1972) was a Rhodesian politician who served as a member of parliament from 1962 until his death. In May 1965, as leader of the United People's Party (UPP), he became the first black politician to serve as Leader of the Opposition in the Rhodesian House of Assembly.

== Political career ==
Gondo was initially a member of the multiracial United Federal Party. He was elected to the Southern Rhodesian Legislative Assembly for the B-roll constituency of Ndanga in the 1962 Southern Rhodesian general election.

Following the dissolution of the Federation of Rhodesia and Nyasaland in December 1963, Gondo became leader of the UPP. In the May 1965 general election, the party won 10 of the 15 B-roll seats, while the governing Rhodesian Front won all 50 A-roll seats. Gondo consequently became Leader of the Opposition, serving opposite Prime Minister Ian Smith.

Gondo opposed proposals for a unilateral declaration of independence (UDI), warning that it could lead to political violence and unrest. In October 1965, he suggested that the UPP might withdraw from parliament if the government declared independence. "To lead the people of Rhodesia to think UDI would create a paradise is ludicrous," he said. Later that month, during British Prime Minister Harold Wilson's visit to Salisbury, Gondo urged him to convene another constitutional conference.

Following UDI on 11 November 1965, Gondo and his party remained in the House of Assembly. Smith invited Gondo to meet him a week after the declaration, but Gondo declined.

On 25 November, Gondo led a walkout of opposition members after the House of Assembly recognised the constitution introduced under UDI. The protest followed the removal of independent MP Ahrn Palley from the chamber by the Serjeant-at-Arms. Eight other B-roll MPs joined Gondo in leaving the chamber. The opposition members returned in February 1966.

On 25 March 1966, Chad Chipunza replaced Gondo as UPP leader and Leader of the Opposition. Gondo became the party's deputy leader but regained the leadership later that year.

After the Rhodesian government rejected the independence proposals negotiated by Wilson and Smith aboard HMS Tiger in December 1966, Gondo called for Smith's resignation, arguing that the rejection amounted to a vote of no confidence in the prime minister. The government rejected his interpretation. On 21 January 1967, Percy Mkudu succeeded Gondo as UPP leader.

Gondo subsequently joined the National Peoples' Union. In the 1970 Rhodesian general election, he was elected to represent Kunyasi, retaining a seat in the House of Assembly. He remained the constituency's MP until his death on 27 October 1972.

Southern Rhodesian Legislative Assembly
New constituency	Member of Parliament for Ndanga; 1962–1970	Assembly dissolved
Political offices
Preceded by David Butler	Leader of the Opposition; 1965–1966	Succeeded by Chad Chipunza
Preceded by Chad Chipunza	Leader of the Opposition; 1966–1967	Succeeded by Percy Mkudu
House of Assembly of Rhodesia
New constituency	Member of Parliament for Kunyasi; 1970–1972	Succeeded by Thomas Zawaira
