= St Andrew's Roundhay United Reformed Church =

Coordinates: 53.8404°N 1.5121°W

St Andrew's Roundhay
- St Andrew's Roundhay United Reformed Church
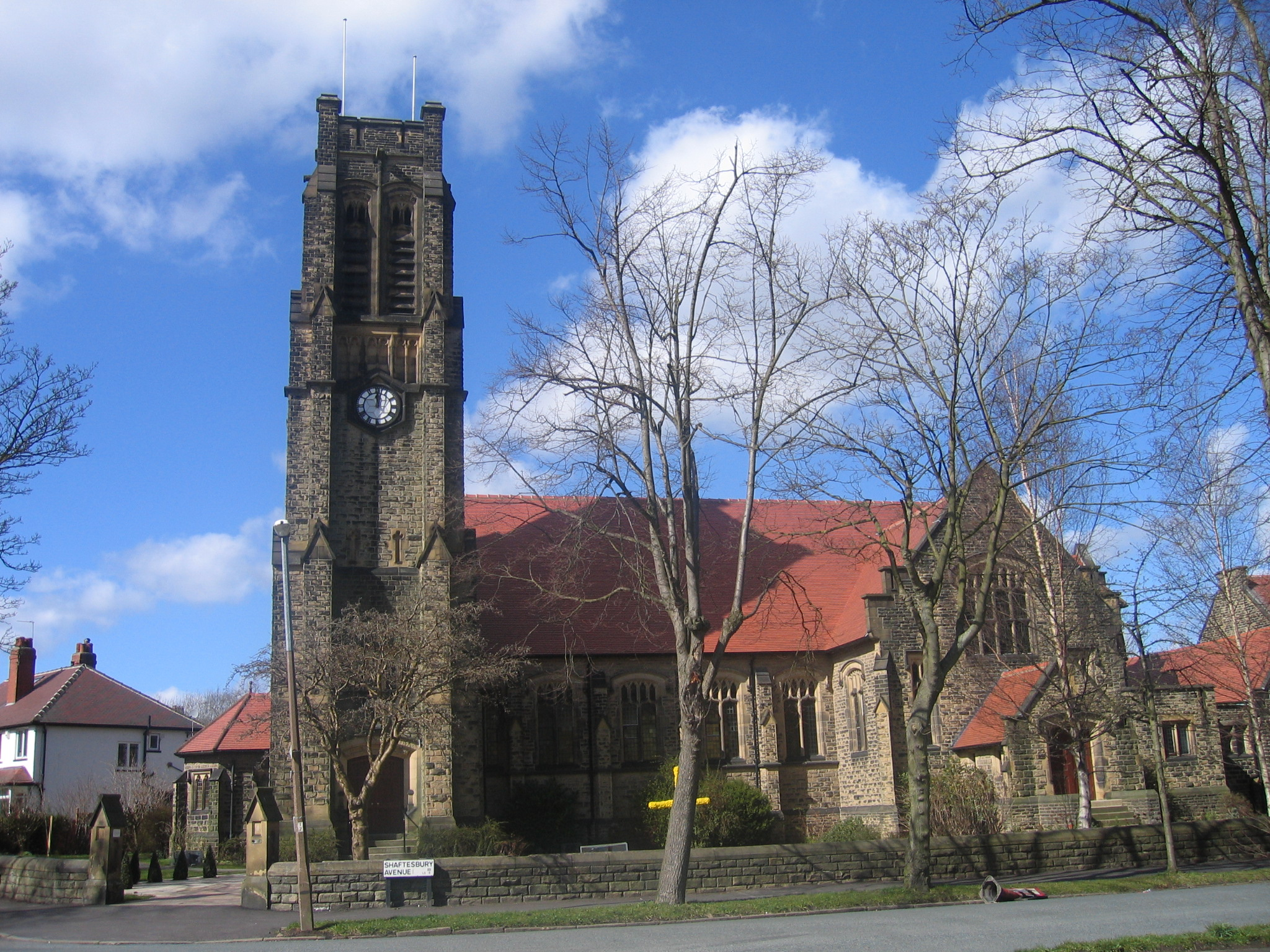
- St Andrew's Roundhay, from Shaftesbury Avenue

- Location in West Yorkshire
- OS grid reference: SE 321 383
- Location: Shaftesbury Avenue, Roundhay, Leeds, West Yorkshire
- Country: England
- Denomination: United Reformed Church
- Website: St Andrew's Roundhay

History
- Status: Nonconformist Church
- Dedication: Saint Andrew

Architecture
- Functional status: Active
- Heritage designation: Grade II
- Designated: 5 August 1976
- Architect: W H Beevers
- Architectural type: Church
- Style: Gothic Revival
- Completed: 1908

Specifications
- Materials: Stone, tile roofs

Administration
- Parish: St Andrew's Roundhay United Reformed Church

St Andrew's Roundhay is in Shaftesbury Avenue, Roundhay, Leeds, West Yorkshire, England. It is an active United Reformed Church. The church and Sunday school is recorded in the National Heritage List for England as a Grade II listed building.

== History ==
St Andrew's Roundhay was built as Roundhay Congregational Church and designed by the architect W H Beevers in Gothic Revival style. The foundation stone of the first School Church was laid in November 1901. The Church was formally constituted in February 1902 with 29 members. The foundation stone of the present church was laid in 1907 and the church was opened in 1908.

In 1972 the church became St Andrew's Roundhay United Reformed Church.

== Architecture ==
The church is constructed in rock-faced gritstone and has a red tile roof. The three-stage tower is tall but slim. The Sunday school is attached to the north end of the church. The church has a five-bay nave with open timber roof and wooden panelling. The east window depicts the parable of the Good Samaritan and is dated 1907.

== International relations ==
St Andrew's Roundhay has a partnership with the Lutherkirche in Frankenthal, Rhineland-Palatinate and the Martinskirche in Bernburg, Saxony-Anhalt, Germany.
