= Hunting Aerosurveys =

British aerial photography company

- Founded: 1944
- Ceased operations: 2001
- Fleet size: See Fleet below
- Key people: Percy Hunting

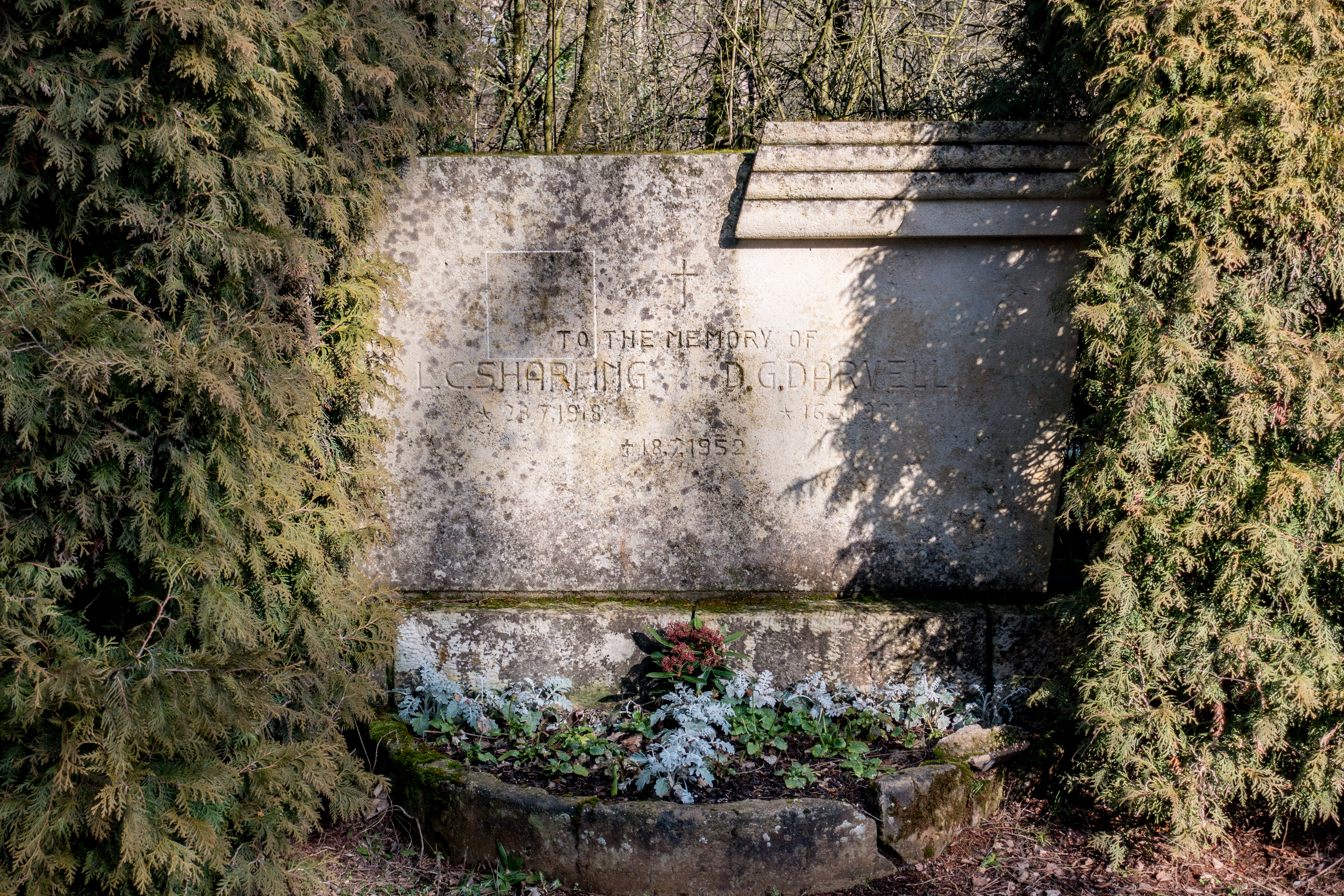
Memorial of the July 1952 AS.40 Oxford (G-AIRZ) fatal crash in Kayl

Hunting Aerosurveys Ltd was a British aerial photography company founded by Percy Hunting in 1944. Its operations became more diversified under the name Hunting Surveys.

== History ==
The firm incorporated Aerofilms Ltd and the Aircraft Operating Company. In 1947 it was using three types of aircraft: Austers, a Percival Proctor and a de Havilland Dragon Rapide and planned to acquire one or more Percival Mergansers. The company had contracts for work surveying for tin mining in Nigeria; oil in Arabia, Venezuela and Colombia; timber in Ontario; and mapping in Australia & Hong Kong (in 1963).

Between 1957 and 1964, Hunting operated a specially converted Auster Autocar for smaller scale aerial survey work.

The firm operated several Percival Prince aircraft for survey work in the UK and abroad. These were G-ALRY (a P.54 Survey Prince), G-AMLW Prince Series III, VP-KNN (ex G-ALRY) and VP-KRN Prince, both of Hunting Aerosurveys (East Africa) Ltd and G-AMOT (P.54 Survey Prince Series IIIA).

In 1960 the firm was merged with Hunting Geophysics Ltd to form Hunting Surveys Ltd. Threatened with closure in the mid-1980s, it was merged with sister company Hunting Aerofilms Ltd to become simply Aerofilms Ltd in 1987. The new company was able to provide state-of-the-art serial survey work and associated mapping, with the oblique aerial photography that Aerofilms had been undertaking since 1919. In 1997 the company was sold to Simmons Mapping in Somerset, a move that ultimately led to the complete closure of the oblique photography business (and its long-established photo library) in 2006, with the vertical / survey side of the business passing to the Somerset operation.

== Fleet ==
- Auster Autocar
- de Havilland Dove
- de Havilland Dragon Rapide
- Douglas C-47B
- Percival Merganser
- Percival Prince
- Percival Proctor
- Survey Prince

== See also ==
- List of defunct airlines of the United Kingdom
- Hunting plc

== Bibliography ==
- Jackson, A.J. (1973). British Civil Aircraft since 1919, Volume 1. Putnam & Company Ltd. ISBN 0-370-10006-9.
