= United People's Party (Rhodesia) =

Political party in Rhodesia

- Abbreviation: UPP
- Leader: Josiah Gondo; Chad Chipunza; Percy Mkudu
- Founded: Before 1965
- Dissolved: 23 June 1969
- Merged into: National People's Union
- Ideology: African political representation Constitutional reform
- Legislative Assembly (1965): 10 / 65

The United People's Party (UPP) was a predominantly black African political party in Rhodesia during the 1960s. Led initially by Josiah Gondo, it became the official parliamentary opposition following the 1965 Rhodesian general election, in which it won 10 of the 15 district seats in the Legislative Assembly of Rhodesia. The party merged with the Democratic Party in June 1969 to form the National People's Union.

== History ==
=== Formation and parliamentary opposition ===
The UPP emerged in the early 1960s, following the decline of the United Federal Party (UFP) and the dissolution of the Federation of Rhodesia and Nyasaland. Gondo had previously represented the UFP in the Southern Rhodesian legislature, having been elected for Ndanga in the 1962 Southern Rhodesian general election. The UPP subsequently became an African parliamentary opposition party, advocating political reform through the existing constitutional system.

Under the 1961 constitution, Rhodesia's electoral system used separate rolls based on income, property and educational qualifications. Although formally non-racial, these arrangements maintained white minority control of the legislature. Unlike the principal African nationalist organisations, the Zimbabwe African People's Union (ZAPU) and Zimbabwe African National Union (ZANU), the UPP participated in elections under the existing constitution.

Following the 1965 election, Gondo became the first black African Leader of the Opposition. He opposed Prime Minister Ian Smith's Unilateral Declaration of Independence (UDI) in November 1965. On 25 November, he led a parliamentary walkout in protest against the government's adoption of a new constitution following UDI.

=== Leadership disputes ===
On 25 March 1966, Chad Chipunza succeeded Gondo as party leader. Gondo regained the leadership on 31 August 1966, before being replaced by Percy Mkudu in January 1967.

The party continued to oppose Smith's government through parliamentary means. In February 1969, Mkudu travelled to Dar es Salaam, where he unsuccessfully sought assistance from the Organisation of African Unity for a campaign of constitutional opposition. He criticised the government's proposed constitutional changes as a further entrenchment of racial discrimination.

=== Merger ===
On 23 June 1969, the UPP merged with the Democratic Party, another African political organisation, to establish the National People's Union (NPU). Gordon Chavunduka, formerly chairman of the Democratic Party, became president, while Mkudu was appointed vice-president. The new party advocated majority rule, universal adult suffrage and a democratic government accountable to the electorate.

Internal divisions continued after the merger. On 27 August 1969, the NPU's parliamentary members elected Chipunza to replace Mkudu as Leader of the Opposition. Mkudu subsequently resigned from the parliamentary caucus. The NPU continued to participate in Rhodesian politics following the UPP's dissolution.

== Electoral history ==
Election	Leader	Seats	Status
1965	Josiah Gondo	10 / 65	Official opposition
