= Aircraft Operating Company =

British aerial photography company

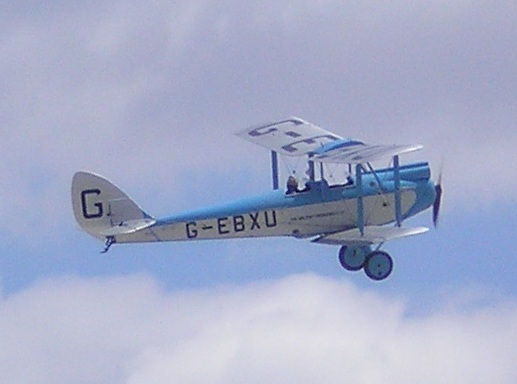
- De Havilland DH.60 Moth at FIO
- Industry: Aerial photography and surveying
- Founder: Harold Hemming AFC
- Key people: Francis L. Wills

The Aircraft Operating Company was a British aerial photography company, that took over Aerofilms in 1925. In 1940, its staff and equipment were requisitioned by the Air Ministry, and in 1944 the company itself was taken over by Hunting Aerosurveys.

== History ==
The Aircraft Operating Company Ltd (AOC) was founded by Harold Hemming AFC (also known as Major 'Lemnos' Hemming), a former Royal Flying Corps pilot, aerial survey pilot and amateur air racing pilot. Hemming was managing director, and his business partner Alan S. Butler was chairman of the board. In 1925, AOC took over Aerofilms Ltd, and continued to employ Francis L. Wills as managing director of that company, that expanded its operations based at Hendon.

In 1925, Ordnance Survey awarded to AOC the first contracts for the development of aerial photography in the production of its surveying and map-making operations. Throughout the 1920s and 1930s, AOC was employed by Ordnance Survey for surveying in many British overseas colonies in the Middle East, Africa, Asia, etc. Contracts were also obtained from foreign governments such as Brazil for similar work.

In the 1920s, AOC owned and operated various aircraft, such as Airco DH.9A and Vickers Vendace, but it identified a need for an aircraft designed specifically optimised for aerial surveying and photography. The result was the Gloster AS.31 Survey, a development of the De Havilland DH.67 design project. Starting in 1930, AOC used a Gloster Survey for aerial surveying in southern Africa, where a sister company was formed, Aircraft Operating Company of Africa (Pty.) Ltd.

In 1933, AOC and Aerofilms were incorporated in a new company, H. Hemming and Partners. AOC established its headquarters in Wembley, Middlesex.

In 1938, AOC purchased a Swiss-made Wild A5 Autograph photogrammetric plotting machine that could minimise the effects of optical distortion and perspective in magnified aerial photographs. In early 1939, Sidney Cotton employed the facilities of AOC for production and interpretation of both vertical and oblique aerial photographs taken of ground installations in Germany and elsewhere in clandestine flight operations.

On 31 May 1940, the staff and equipment of AOC were requisitioned by the Air Ministry. Hemming became a squadron leader, later wing commander; expert AOC photographic interpreter Michael Spender was joined by new RAF personnel headed by Squadron Leader Walter Heath. Operations continued to expand at the Wembley head office (nicknamed 'Paduoc House') under the title Photographic Development Unit (Interpretation) (or PDU(I)), as a companion unit to No.1 PDU headed by Sidney Cotton. Formal training of many photographic interpreters (PIs) took place at Wembley, particularly of WAAF staff, including Constance Babington Smith. On 11 July 1940, the unit was renamed Photographic Interpretation Unit. On 2 October 1940, the main factory at Wembley suffered major damage from aerial bombing. On 7 January 1941, the unit was renamed Central Interpretation Unit, and operations were progressively transferred to a new headquarters at Danesfield House in Buckinghamshire, also known as RAF Medmenham; the transfer was completed on 23 May 1941.

In 1944, Percy Hunting, who was a major shareholder in AOC, formed a new company Hunting Aerosurveys Ltd for the purpose of carrying out civilian commercial surveying via aerial photography. Hunting Aerosurveys took over the Aircraft Operating Company, and Aircraft Operating Company was no longer used as a brand. However, its subsidiary Aerofilms continued as a named resource for aerial photographs, and its co-founder Francis Wills went on to become managing director of Hunting Aerosurveys.

== Bibliography ==
- Babington Smith, Constance. 1957, 2004. Evidence in Camera: The Story of Photographic Intelligence in the Second World War. Sutton Publishing ISBN 0-7509-3648-7
- Cotton, Sidney as told to Ralph Barker. 1969. Aviator Extraordinary: The Sidney Cotton Story. Chatto & Windus ISBN 0-7011-1334-0
- Nesbit, Roy Conyers. 1996. Eyes of the RAF. Sutton Publishing ISBN 0-7509-1130-1
