= 1965 Rhodesian general election =

- 7 May 1965

All 65 seats in the Legislative Assembly 33 seats needed for a majority
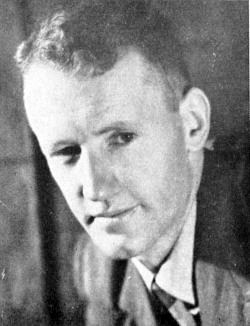

| | First party | Second party |
|---|---|---|
| Leader | Ian Smith | Josiah Gondo |
| Party | RF | United People's Party |
| Last election | 35 | – |
| Seats won | 50 | 10 |
| Seat change | ▲15 | New |
- Composition of the Legislative Assembly after the election
Prime Minister before election
Ian Smith
RF
Elected Prime Minister
Ian Smith
RF

General elections were held in Rhodesia on 7 May 1965, the first since the country dropped the name Southern Rhodesia in 1964. The ruling Rhodesian Front (RF), led by Prime Minister Ian Smith, won all 50 constituency seats in the Legislative Assembly of Rhodesia, retaining its parliamentary majority. The predominantly black African United People's Party (UPP), led by Josiah Gondo, won 10 of the 15 district seats, making Gondo the first black African Leader of the Opposition.

The election took place amid a dispute between the Rhodesian government and the United Kingdom over independence without majority rule. Six months later, on 11 November 1965, Smith's government issued a unilateral declaration of independence (UDI).

== Electoral system ==
The election was conducted under the 1961 constitution, which established two electoral rolls with different income, property and educational qualifications. The higher-qualified A roll was predominantly white, while the lower-qualified B roll was predominantly black African. The A roll contained 95,208 white and 2,256 black African voters.

The Legislative Assembly comprised 50 constituency seats and 15 district seats. Voters on both rolls could participate in elections for both types of seat, but A-roll votes carried greater weight in constituency elections, while B-roll votes carried greater weight in district elections. Although the qualifications were formally non-racial, the system ensured that the predominantly white electorate retained control of the 50 constituency seats and therefore the parliamentary majority.

== Campaign ==
The Rhodesian Front contested all 50 constituency seats, including 22 in which its candidates were unopposed, but did not contest the district seats. The election was dominated by the government's pursuit of independence from Britain and disagreements over the pace of political reform.

The African parliamentary opposition was led by Josiah Gondo of the United People's Party. The party participated in the constitutional electoral system, unlike the principal African nationalist movements, whose organisations faced government restrictions and whose leaders opposed the existing arrangements. The UPP subsequently formed the official parliamentary opposition.

== Results ==
The Rhodesian Front won all 50 constituency seats, an increase of 15 over the previous election. Ten district seats were won by the United People's Party, while independents won the remaining five.

| Party | Constituency | | | | | District | | | | | Total seats | +/− |
| Party | A roll | | B roll | | Seats | A roll | | B roll | | Seats | Total seats | +/− |
| Party | Votes | % | Votes | % | Seats | Votes | % | Votes | % | Seats | Total seats | +/− |
|---|---|---|---|---|---|---|---|---|---|---|---|---|
| Rhodesian Front | 28,175 | 79.32 | 206 | 28.61 | 50 | | | | | | 50 | +15 |
| United People's Party | 6,381 | 17.96 | 505 | 70.14 | 0 | 12,936 | 42.13 | 754 | 52.25 | 10 | 10 | New |
| Independents | 964 | 2.71 | 4 | 0.56 | 0 | 17,770 | 57.87 | 689 | 47.75 | 5 | 5 | +4 |
| Total | 35,520 | 100.00 | 720 | 100.00 | 50 | 30,706 | 100.00 | 1,443 | 100.00 | 15 | 65 | 0 |
| Valid votes | 35,520 | 98.86 | 720 | 82.10 | | 30,706 | 86.98 | 1,443 | 88.20 | | | |
| Invalid/blank votes | 411 | 1.14 | 157 | 17.90 | | 4,595 | 13.02 | 193 | 11.80 | | | |
| Total votes | 35,931 | 100.00 | 877 | 100.00 | | 35,301 | 100.00 | 1,636 | 100.00 | | | |
| Registered voters/turnout | 97,284 | 36.9 | 11,577 | 7.5 | | 97,284 | 36.2 | 11,577 | 14.0 | | | |
Source: Sternberger et al.

== Aftermath ==
The election strengthened Smith's parliamentary position as his government continued negotiations with Britain over independence. Following UDI on 11 November 1965, the United People's Party remained in parliamentary opposition. Gondo and other opposition members protested against the new constitutional arrangements, while the British government continued to regard Rhodesia's declaration as illegal.

Gondo was succeeded as UPP leader by Chad Chipunza in March 1966, although he subsequently regained the position. Percy Mkudu became party leader in January 1967.
