= Aerofilms =

Aerofilms Ltd
- Type: Limited company
- Industry: Aerial photography
- Founded: May 9, 1919; 107 years ago in Edgware, Greater London, UK
- Founders: Francis Wills; Claude Graham White
- Successor: Simmons Aerofilms Ltd (2001-2005); Blom Aerofilms / Blom UK (2005)
- Parent: Aircraft Operating Company (1925); Simmons Mapping (UK) Ltd (1997)
- Divisions: Allied Photographic Interpretation Unit
- Subsidiaries: Hunting Group of Companies

Aerofilms Ltd was the UK's first commercial aerial photography company, founded in 1919 by Francis Wills and Claude Graham White. Wills had served as an Observer with the Royal Naval Air Service during World War I, and was the driving force behind the expansion of the company from an office and a bathroom (for developing films) in Hendon to a business with major contracts in Africa and Asia as well as in the UK. Co-founder Graham-White was a pioneer aviator who had achieved fame by making the first night flight in 1910.

== History ==
Operations began from the Stag Lane Aerodrome at Edgware, using the aircraft of the London Flying School. Subsequently, the Aircraft Manufacturing Company (later the De Havilland Aircraft Company), hired an Airco DH.9 along with pilot entrepreneur Alan Cobham. In its early years, Aerofilms had links with pioneer cinematographer Claude Friese-Greene.

From 1921, Aerofilms carried out vertical photography for survey and mapping purposes. During the 1930s, the company pioneered the science of photogrammetry (mapping from aerial photographs), with the Ordnance Survey amongst the company's clients. In its earliest days, the main work of the company had been oblique photography, and the images were often sold to postcard manufacturers.

In 1925, Aircraft Operating Company took over Aerofilms, and expanded its operations, based at Hendon.

In 1940, the company's staff and state-of-the-art equipment were co-opted into the war effort, forming the nucleus of the Allied Photographic Interpretation Unit at Medmenham. It was at this time that Sir Percy Hunting became interested in the company, which led Aerofilms to become a member of the Hunting Group of Companies in 1942. After the war, Aerofilms became responsible for oblique photography, whilst Hunting Aerosurveys undertook vertical photography for survey.

Post-war redevelopment and industrial expansion kept both Aerofilms and Hunting Surveys Ltd hard at work, which has resulted in an expansive library of historic aerial photography.

Unlike other photographic libraries, a significant percentage of Aerofilms photos is already in the public domain, albeit protected by copyright. The company would send out batches of photos to public libraries, and many remain there today. In addition, key images were reproduced as postcards from the 1920s through to the 1980s. In addition to Aerofilms’ own imagery, the firm expanded its holdings with the purchase of two smaller collections – AeroPictorial (1934-1960) and Airviews (1947-1991).

In 1997, the parent company of Simmons Mapping (UK) Ltd acquired Aerofilms Limited, and in 2001, the two companies merged to form Simmons Aerofilms Ltd. In 2005, Simmons Aerofilms was taken over by Norwegian-based geographical information and offshore technology company Blom and is now known as Blom Aerofilms / Blom UK. The photo library and associated photolabs were closed in 2006. In June 2007, Blom sold the historic Aerofilms oblique library to English Heritage in partnership with The Royal Commission on the Ancient and Historical Monuments of Scotland (RCAHMS) and The Royal Commission on the Ancient and Historical Monuments of Wales (RCAHMW). Since then the bulk of the negatives from 1919 to the early 1950s have been digitised, geo-referenced and made available online as Britain from Above. The digitization project took 4 years with financial help from the Heritage Lottery Fund, The Foyle Foundation and other donors and now, over 95,000 images are available on the website. Photographs attributed to Aerofilms Ltd are also held in the Conway Library at The Courtauld Institute of Art whose archive, of primarily architectural images, is being digitised under the wider Courtauld Connects project.

== Publication of photos ==
Aerofilms photographs have been used in books relating to geography, topography and travel, and have featured in books such as The Aerofilms Book of England from the Air (1988) and Coastlines from the Air (1996). In addition its photographs are used in the series Aerofilms Guide: Football Grounds, first published in 1993 and updated on an annual basis. Another example of the company's work was the title-sequence mosaic of east London, used until 2009, for the BBC soap EastEnders. Photographs from the archive feature in the 2008 book British Seaside Piers by Richard Riding and Chris Mawson, former Aerofilms librarian.

The Aerofilms Historic Collection is an archive of oblique aerial photography of the United Kingdom. It now includes 1.26 million negatives and more than 2000 photograph albums—The Times reporting in 1995 that Aerofilms had 1.12 million photographs spanning 75 years. Its chronological and geographical coverage documents the face of Britain dating from 1919 to recent years, providing evidence of a period of change and, according to English Heritage, "includes the largest and most significant number of air photographs of Britain taken before 1939". The collection covers the countryside, industrial and urban landscapes, archaeological sites and historic buildings and charts the growth of new towns and the spread of motorways across the landscape. Almost every community is represented, many with a series of views taken over the decades showing how cities, towns and villages have changed and grown. This provides a resource for understanding and managing the built and natural environments.

The albums containing photographs are held in England, Wales and Scotland according to their coverage. In England the negatives, albums and associated documentation are in specialist archival storage at the Historic England Archive in Swindon.
