= Sheynovo Peak =

Mountain in Antarctica

Location of Brabant Island in the Antarctic Peninsula region.

Sheynovo Peak (Bulgarian: връх Шейново, romanized: vrah Sheynovo, IPA: [ˈvrɤx ˈʃɛjnovo]) is the mostly ice-covered peak of elevation 811 m in Solvay Mountains on Brabant Island in the Palmer Archipelago, Antarctica. It has steep and partly ice-free northeast and west slopes, and surmounts Buragara Cove to the north, Rush Glacier to the northeast and Dimkov Glacier to the south.

The peak is named after the settlement of Sheynovo in Southern Bulgaria.

== Location ==
Sheynovo Peak is located at 64°24′22″S 62°37′06″W, which is 3.2 km east of Humann Point, 3 km southeast of Zabel Point, 3.35 km west of Mount Aciar and 2.37 km north-northwest of Kondolov Peak. British mapping in 1980 and 2008.

== Maps ==
- Antarctic Digital Database (ADD). Scale 1:250000 topographic map of Antarctica. Scientific Committee on Antarctic Research (SCAR). Since 1993, regularly upgraded and updated.
- British Antarctic Territory. Scale 1:200000 topographic map. DOS 610 Series, Sheet W 64 62. Directorate of Overseas Surveys, Tolworth, UK, 1980.
- Brabant Island to Argentine Islands. Scale 1:250000 topographic map. British Antarctic Survey, 2008.
