= Dimkov Glacier =

Glacier in Antarctica

- Location of Brabant Island in the Antarctic Peninsula region

- Location within Antarctica
- Location: Palmer Archipelago
- Coordinates: 64°25′10″S 62°37′40″W
- Length: 3 nmi (6 km; 3 mi)
- Width: 2 nmi (4 km; 2 mi)
- Thickness: unknown
- Terminus: Solvay Mountains
- Status: unknown

Dimkov Glacier (Bulgarian: Димков ледник, romanized: Dimkov lednik, IPA: [ˈdimkof ˈlɛdnik]) is a 6 km long and 4.3 km wide glacier draining the western slopes of Solvay Mountains on Brabant Island in the Palmer Archipelago, Antarctica. It is situated southwest of Rush Glacier and west of Jenner Glacier, and flows southwestwards between Kondolov Peak and Sheynovo Peak to enter Duperré Bay south of Humann Point.

The glacier is named for the Bulgarian theoretician and practitioner of traditional medicine Petar Dimkov (1886-1981).

== Location ==
Dimkov Glacier is centred at 64°25′10″S 62°37′40″W according to British mapping in 1980 and 2008.

== See also ==
- List of glaciers in the Antarctic
- Glaciology

== Maps ==
- Antarctic Digital Database (ADD). Scale 1:250000 topographic map of Antarctica. Scientific Committee on Antarctic Research (SCAR). Since 1993, regularly upgraded and updated.
- British Antarctic Territory. Scale 1:200000 topographic map. DOS 610 Series, Sheet W 64 62. Directorate of Overseas Surveys, Tolworth, UK, 1980.
- Brabant Island to Argentine Islands. Scale 1:250000 topographic map. British Antarctic Survey, 2008.
