= Kondolov Peak =

Mountain in Antarctica

Location of Brabant Island in the Antarctic Peninsula region.

Kondolov Peak (Bulgarian: Кондолов връх, romanized: Kondolov vrah, IPA: [ˈkɔndoɫov ˈvrɤx]) is the mostly ice-covered peak of elevation 891 m in Solvay Mountains on Brabant Island in the Palmer Archipelago, Antarctica. It has steep and partly ice-free southwest and northwest slopes, and surmounts Jenner Glacier to the southeast, Duperré Bay to the southwest and Dimkov Glacier to the west-northwest.

The peak is named after Georgi Kondolov (1858-1903), a leader of the Bulgarian liberation movement in Thrace and Macedonia.

== Location ==
Kondolov Peak is located at 64°25′30″S 62°35′46″W, which is 4.9 km southeast of Humann Point, 2.37 km south-southeast of Sheynovo Peak, 3.55 km southwest of Mount Aciar, 3.5 km west-northwest of Paprat Peak and 6.07 km north of Mount Bulcke. British mapping in 1980 and 2008.

== Maps ==
- Antarctic Digital Database (ADD). Scale 1:250000 topographic map of Antarctica. Scientific Committee on Antarctic Research (SCAR). Since 1993, regularly upgraded and updated.
- British Antarctic Territory. Scale 1:200000 topographic map. DOS 610 Series, Sheet W 64 62. Directorate of Overseas Surveys, Tolworth, UK, 1980.
- Brabant Island to Argentine Islands. Scale 1:250000 topographic map. British Antarctic Survey, 2008.
