= Paprat Peak =

Mountain in Antarctica

Location of Brabant Island in the Antarctic Peninsula region.

Paprat Peak (Bulgarian: връх Папрат, romanized: vrah Paprat, IPA: [ˈvrɤx ˈpaprɐt]) is the ice-covered peak of elevation 549 m in Solvay Mountains on Brabant Island in the Palmer Archipelago, Antarctica. It surmounts Koch Glacier to the east, Chiriguano Bay to the south and Jenner Glacier to the northwest.

The peak is named after the settlement of Paprat in Southern Bulgaria.

== Location ==
Paprat Peak is located at 64°26′18″S 62°31′49″W, which is 3.5 km east-southeast of Kondolov Peak, 4.4 km south by east of Mount Aciar, 7.35 km southwest of Cook Summit, 7 km northwest of Cervantes Point and 6 km northeast of Mount Bulcke. British mapping in 1980 and 2008.

== Maps ==
- Antarctic Digital Database (ADD). Scale 1:250000 topographic map of Antarctica. Scientific Committee on Antarctic Research (SCAR). Since 1993, regularly upgraded and updated.
- British Antarctic Territory. Scale 1:200000 topographic map. DOS 610 Series, Sheet W 64 62. Directorate of Overseas Surveys, Tolworth, UK, 1980.
- Brabant Island to Argentine Islands. Scale 1:250000 topographic map. British Antarctic Survey, 2008.
