= Koch Glacier =

Glacier in Antarctica

- Location of Brabant Island in the Antarctic Peninsula region

- Location within Antarctica
- Location: Palmer Archipelago
- Coordinates: 64°27′S 62°30′W
- Length: 3 nmi (6 km; 3 mi)
- Thickness: unknown
- Terminus: Chiriguano Bay
- Status: unknown

Koch Glacier (64°27′S 62°30′W) is a glacier 3 nautical miles (6 km) long immediately east of Jenner Glacier on the south side of Brabant Island, in the Palmer Archipelago, Antarctica. It drains the south slopes of Solvay Mountains and flows south-southwestwards into Chiriguano Bay southeast of Paprat Peak.

The glacier was first shown on an Argentine government chart in 1953, but not named. The glacier was photographed by Hunting Aerosurveys Ltd in 1956–57, and mapped from these photos in 1959. It was named by the UK Antarctic Place-Names Committee for Robert Koch, the pioneer German bacteriologist who discovered Mycobacterium tuberculosis, the bacterium responsible for most cases of tuberculosis.

== See also ==
- List of glaciers in the Antarctic
- Glaciology

== Maps ==
- Antarctic Digital Database (ADD). Scale 1:250000 topographic map of Antarctica. Scientific Committee on Antarctic Research (SCAR). Since 1993, regularly upgraded and updated.
- British Antarctic Territory. Scale 1:200000 topographic map. DOS 610 Series, Sheet W 64 62. Directorate of Overseas Surveys, Tolworth, UK, 1980.
- Brabant Island to Argentine Islands. Scale 1:250000 topographic map. British Antarctic Survey, 2008.
