= Aluzore Gap =

Location of Brabant Island in the Antarctic Peninsula region.

Aluzore Gap (Bulgarian: седловина Алузоре, romanized: Sedlovina Aluzore \se-dlo-vi-'na a-lu-'zo-re\) is the ice-covered saddle of elevation 1078 m connecting Stribog Mountains to Solvay Mountains on Brabant Island in the Palmer Archipelago, Antarctica. It extends 3 km in north-northwest to south-southeast direction, and is part of the glacial divide between Hippocrates Glacier to the east, and Zlatiya Glacier and Rush Glacier to the west and southwest respectively.

The saddle is named after the ancient Roman station of Aluzore in Southern Bulgaria.

== Location ==
Aluzore Gap is centred at 64°20′45″S 62°27′55″W, which is 3.15 km east-southeast of Veles Bastion, 3.15 km west-northwest of Mount Imhotep, 4.8 km northwest of Galen Peak and 3.2 km northeast of Mount Sarnegor. British mapping in 1980 and 2008.

== Maps ==
- Antarctic Digital Database (ADD). Scale 1:250000 topographic map of Antarctica. Scientific Committee on Antarctic Research (SCAR). Since 1993, regularly upgraded and updated.
- British Antarctic Territory. Scale 1:200000 topographic map. DOS 610 Series, Sheet W 64 62. Directorate of Overseas Surveys, Tolworth, UK, 1980.
- Brabant Island to Argentine Islands. Scale 1:250000 topographic map. British Antarctic Survey, 2008.
