= Slavic Native Faith's calendars and holidays =

In Slavic Native Faith (Rodnovery) there are a number of shared holidays throughout the year, when important ritual activities are set according to shared calendars. Generally speaking, ritual activities may be distinguished into "external" (exoteric) and "internal" (esoteric) relatively to the different communities. External ceremonies are mass gatherings, usually held on important holidays dedicated to the worship of common gods, and involving large numbers of people. Internal ceremonies are those restricted to specific groups, and holding special meaning for such groups; they may comprise private rituals and worship of specific ancestors.

== Calendars of holidays ==
=== Ivanits and Rybakov's calendar of holidays ===
Linda J. Ivanits reconstructs a basic calendar of the East Slavs' celebrations of Slavic gods, based on Boris Rybakov's studies of ancient agricultural calendars, especially a fourth-century calendar found in the Kyiv region.

Festival	Date (Julian or Gregorian)	Deity celebrated	Overlapped Christian festival or figure
Koliada (Korochun)	Winter solstice	Rod: first half Veles: last half	Christmas, Baptism of the Lord, Epiphany
Komoeditsa	Spring equinox	Veles	Easter
Day of Young Shoots	May 2	—	Saints Boris and Gleb
Semik	June 4	Yarilo	—
Rusalnaya Week	June 17–23	Simargl	Trinity Sunday
Kupala Night; Kupalo	Summer solstice	—	Saint John the Baptist
Festival of Perun	July 20	Rod / Perun	Saint Elijah
Harvest festivals	Autumn equinox	Rodzanica / Rodzanicy	Feast of the Transfiguration (August 6); Birthday of the Mother of God (September 8)
Festival of Mokosh	October 28	Mokosh	Saint Paraskeva's Friday

=== General Russian Rodnover calendar of holidays ===
According to the Rodnover questions–answers compendium Izvednik (Изведник), almost all Russian Rodnovers rely upon the Gregorian calendar and celebrate the "sunny holidays" (highlighted in yellow in the table below), with the addition of holidays dedicated to Perun, Mokosh and Veles (highlighted in green), the Red Hill ancestral holiday (highlighted in orange), and five further holidays dedicated to ancestors (including Вешние Деды, "Spring Forefathers"; Трояцкие Деды, "Whitsun Forefathers"; Дмитровские Деды, "Demetrius Forefathers"; and Рождественские Деды, "Christmas Forefathers", etc.). The contemporary Rodnover calendar is structured as follows:

Festival	Event	Date (Gregorian)
Koliada; Коляда	Winter solstice	December 24–25
Days of Veles (Festival of Veles); Velesovy dny (Велесовы дни)	Celebration of the god of animals, forests and commerce	January 2, 6 / February 17
Komoeditsa; Комоедица; Often conflated with Maslenitsa	Spring equinox	March 24
Krasnaya Gorka; Красная Горка (lit. "Red Hill")	Celebration of ancestors	April 30–May 1
Kupala Night; Купала	Summer solstice	June 23–24
Day of Perun; Perunov den (Перунов день)	Celebration of the thunder god	August 2
Tausen (also called Bogach, Vtorye Oseniny or Ruyen); Таусень (Богач, Вторые Осенины, Руень)	Autumn equinox	September 21
Day of Mokosh; Mokoshy den (Мокоши день)	Celebration of the great goddess of the Earth	November 10

== Calendars of months ==
=== Names of months in local Slavic traditions ===
In some Slavic languages, such as Russian, the modern names of the months are borrowings from Latin. Otherwise, local traditions and other Slavic languages have preserved Slavic endonyms (endogenous names) for months. Volkhv Aleksey Aleksandrovich Dobroslav has proposed a standardised nomenclature, as reported in the table below. Many Slavic months' names refer to natural phenomena, things and human crafts (for instance, Traven means "Grass"; Bulgarian Sukh means "Dry", etc.).

Latinate	Dobroslav months	Belarusian	Bulgarian	Croatian	Czech	Upper Sorbian	Polish	Serbian	Ukrainian
January	Prosinec; Просинец	Studzień; Студзень	Goljam sečko Голям сечко	Siječanj	Leden	Wulki róžk	Styczeń	Koložeg; Коложег	Sičen'; Січень
February	Ljuten'; Лютень	Liuty; Люты	Malăk sečko Малък сечко	Veljača	Únor	Mały róžk	Luty	Sečko; Сечко	Ljutyj; Лютий
March	Berezen'; Березень	Sakavik; Сакавік	Suh; Сух	Ožujak	Březen	Nalětnik	Marzec	Derikoža; Дерикожа	Berezen'; Березень
April	Cveten'; Цветень	Krasavik; Красавік	Brjazok; Брязок	Travanj	Duben	Jutrownik	Kwiecień	Lažitrava; Лажитрава	Kviten'; Квітень
May	Traven'; Травень	Travień; Травень	Treven; Тревен	Svibanj	Květen	Róžownik	Maj	Cvetanj; Цветањ	Traven'; Травень
June	Kresen'; Кресень	Červień; Чэрвень	Izok; Изок	Lipanj	Červen	Smažnik	Czerwiec	Trešnjar; Трешњар	Červen'; Червень
July	Lipen'; Липень	Lipień; Ліпень	Črăvenă; Чръвенъ	Srpanj	Červenec	Pražnik	Lipiec	Žetvar; Жетвар	Lypen'; Липень
August	Zarev; Зарев	Žnivień; Жнівень	Orač; Орач	Kolovoz	Srpen	Žnjenc	Sierpień	Gumnik; Гумник	Serpen'; Серпень
September	Ruen'; Руен	Vierasień; Верасень	Ruen; Руен	Rujan	Září	Požnjenc	Wrzesień	Grozdober; Гроздобер	Veresen'; Вересень
October	Listopad; Листопад	Kastryčnik; Кастрычнік	Listopad; Листопад	Listopad	Říjen	Winowc	Październik	Šumopad; Шумопад	Žovten'; Жовтень
November	Gruden'; Грудень	Listapad; Лістапад	Gruden; Груден	Studeni	Listopad	Nazymnik	Listopad	Studeni; Студени	Lystopad; Листопад
December	Studen'; Студень	Sniežań; Снежань	Studen; Студен	Prosinac	Prosinec	Hodownik	Grudzień	Koledar; Коледар	Hruden; Грудень

== See also ==
- Festival of Veles
- Slavic Native Faith
- Slavic calendar
- Wheel of the Year
- Heathen holidays

== Sources ==
=== References ===
- Ivanits, Linda J. (1989). Russian Folk Belief. M. E. Sharpe. ISBN 9780765630889.
- Aitamurto, Kaarina (2016). Paganism, Traditionalism, Nationalism: Narratives of Russian Rodnoverie. London and New York: Routledge. ISBN 9781472460271.
