= Mount Sarnegor =

Mountain in Graham Land, Antarctica

Location of Brabant Island in the Antarctic Peninsula region.

Mount Sarnegor (Bulgarian: връх Сърнегор, romanized: vrah Sarnegor, IPA: [ˈvrɤx sɐrnɛˈɡɔr]) is the mostly ice-covered mountain of elevation 1189 m in Solvay Mountains on Brabant Island in the Palmer Archipelago, Antarctica. It has steep and partly ice-free southwest and northwest slopes, and surmounts Zlatiya Glacier to the north, Rush Glacier to the south and Aluzore Gap to the east-northeast. A westerly offshoot of the feature forms Sidell Spur, extending to the seashore.

The mountain is named after the settlement of Sarnegor in Southern Bulgaria.

== Location ==
Mount Sarnegor is located at 64°21′34″S 62°31′27″W, which is 4.4 km southeast of Fleming Point, 2.77 km south of Veles Bastion, 6.32 km west of Mount Imhotep, 4.7 km north by east of Mount Aciar and 5.26 km east-northeast of Devene Point. British mapping in 1980 and 2008.

== Maps ==
- Antarctic Digital Database (ADD). Scale 1:250000 topographic map of Antarctica. Scientific Committee on Antarctic Research (SCAR). Since 1993, regularly upgraded and updated.
- British Antarctic Territory. Scale 1:200000 topographic map. DOS 610 Series, Sheet W 64 62. Directorate of Overseas Surveys, Tolworth, UK, 1980.
- Brabant Island to Argentine Islands. Scale 1:250000 topographic map. British Antarctic Survey, 2008.
