= Zabel Point =

Point in the Palmer Archipelago, Antarctica

Location of Brabant Island in the Antarctic Peninsula region.

Zabel Point (Bulgarian: нос Забел, ‘Nos Zabel’ \'nos 'za-bel\) is the ice-covered, rock-tipped point on the southwest side of the entrance to Buragara Cove on the west coast of Brabant Island in the Palmer Archipelago, Antarctica. It was formed as a result of the retreat of Rush Glacier near the start of the 21st century.

The point is named after the settlement of Zabel in Western Bulgaria.

== Location ==
Zabel Point is located at 64°23′05.5″S 62°39′21″W, which is 2.08 km southwest of Devene Point, 2.4 km northeast of Humann Point and 6.9 km east-northeast of Gand Island.

== Maps ==
- Antarctic Digital Database (ADD). Scale 1:250000 topographic map of Antarctica. Scientific Committee on Antarctic Research (SCAR). Since 1993, regularly upgraded and updated.
- British Antarctic Territory. Scale 1:200000 topographic map. DOS 610 Series, Sheet W 64 62. Directorate of Overseas Surveys, Tolworth, UK, 1980.
- Brabant Island to Argentine Islands. Scale 1:250000 topographic map. British Antarctic Survey, 2008.
