= Devene Point =

Point in the Palmer Archipelago, Antarctica

Location of Brabant Island in the Antarctic Peninsula region.

Devene Point (Bulgarian: нос Девене, Nos Devene \'nos 'de-ve-ne\) is the narrow rock-tipped point projecting 600 m westwards into Dallmann Bay, and forming the northeast side of the entrance to Buragara Cove on the west coast of Brabant Island in the Palmer Archipelago, Antarctica. It was formed as a result of the retreat of Rush Glacier near the start of the 21st century.

The point is named after the settlement of Devene in Northwestern Bulgaria.

== Location ==
Devene Point is located at 64°22′11.6″S 62°37′49″W, which is 2.08 km northeast of Zabel Point, 8.5 km east-northeast of Gand Island and 4.68 km south-southwest of Fleming Point.

== Maps ==
- Antarctic Digital Database (ADD). Scale 1:250000 topographic map of Antarctica. Scientific Committee on Antarctic Research (SCAR). Since 1993, regularly upgraded and updated.
- British Antarctic Territory. Scale 1:200000 topographic map. DOS 610 Series, Sheet W 64 62. Directorate of Overseas Surveys, Tolworth, UK, 1980.
- Brabant Island to Argentine Islands. Scale 1:250000 topographic map. British Antarctic Survey, 2008.
