= Zlatiya Glacier =

Glacier in Antarctica

- Location of Brabant Island in the Antarctic Peninsula region

- Location within Antarctica
- Location: Palmer Archipelago
- Coordinates: 64°20′40″S 62°31′00″W
- Length: 4 nmi (7 km; 5 mi)
- Width: 2 nmi (4 km; 2 mi)
- Thickness: unknown
- Terminus: Dallmann Bay
- Status: unknown

Zlatiya Glacier (Bulgarian: ледник Златия, romanized: lednik Zlatiya, IPA: [ˈlɛdniɡ zɫɐˈtijɐ]) is the 6.7 km long and 3 km wide glacier on Brabant Island in the Palmer Archipelago, Antarctica situated north of Rush Glacier and west of upper Hippocrates Glacier. It drains west-southwestwards from Aluzore Gap, flows between Mount Sarnegor and Veles Bastion, and enters Dallmann Bay north of Sidell Spur and south of Fleming Point.

The glacier is named after the settlements of Zlatiya in Northwestern and Northeastern Bulgaria.

== Location ==
Zlatiya Glacier is centred at 64°20′40″S 62°31′00″W. British mapping in 1980 and 2008.

== See also ==
- List of glaciers in the Antarctic
- Glaciology

== Maps ==
- Antarctic Digital Database (ADD). Scale 1:250000 topographic map of Antarctica. Scientific Committee on Antarctic Research (SCAR). Since 1993, regularly upgraded and updated.
- British Antarctic Territory. Scale 1:200000 topographic map. DOS 610 Series, Sheet W 64 62. Directorate of Overseas Surveys, Tolworth, UK, 1980.
- Brabant Island to Argentine Islands. Scale 1:250000 topographic map. British Antarctic Survey, 2008.
