= Manoury Island =

Island in Palmer Archipelago, Antarctica

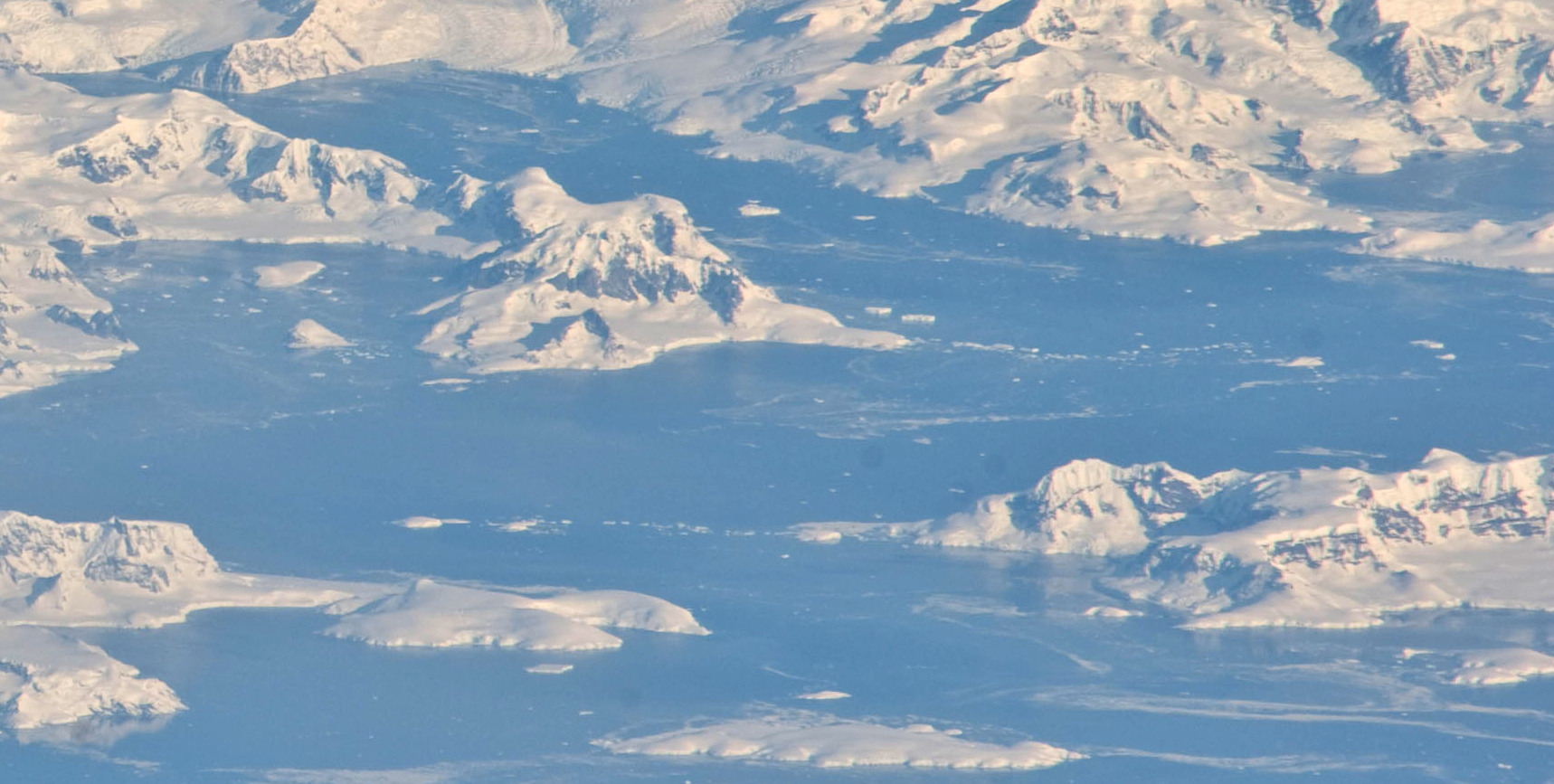
- Gerlache Strait, Mount Beddie (Brabant Island, left), Clifford Peaks (Anvers Island), Gand Island (and in background Rongé Island and Andvord Bay)

- Location within Antarctica

Geography
- Location: Antarctica
- Coordinates: 64°27′S 62°50′W

Administration
- Administered under the Antarctic Treaty System

Demographics
- Population: Uninhabited

Manoury Island is an island lying 3 kilometres (1.5 nmi) south of Gand Island at the north end of Schollaert Channel, in the Palmer Archipelago, Antarctica. It was discovered by the French Antarctic Expedition, 1903–05, and named by Jean-Baptiste Charcot for G. Manoury, secretary of the expedition.

== See also ==
- List of Antarctic and sub-Antarctic islands
