= Lagrange Peak =

Mountain in Antarctica

Lagrange Peak (64°28′S 62°26′W) is a conspicuous peak, 450 metres (1,500 ft) high, standing 5.5 nautical miles (10 km) northeast of Strath Point on the southeast coast of Brabant Island, in the Palmer Archipelago, Antarctica. A point on the coast just south of this peak was first charted and the name Lagrange applied by the Belgian Antarctic Expedition under Gerlache, 1897–99. On one of the photos published by the expedition, the name is applied to the southern tip of the island. To avoid confusion, the generic term has been altered and the name applied to this peak.

== Maps ==
- Antarctic Digital Database (ADD). Scale 1:250000 topographic map of Antarctica. Scientific Committee on Antarctic Research (SCAR). Since 1993, regularly upgraded and updated.
- British Antarctic Territory. Scale 1:200000 topographic map. DOS 610 Series, Sheet W 64 62. Directorate of Overseas Surveys, Tolworth, UK, 1980.
- Brabant Island to Argentine Islands. Scale 1:250000 topographic map. British Antarctic Survey, 2008.

== See also ==
- Larvik Harbour, a small bay southwest of Lagrange Peak
