= Manoury =

Manoury is a French family name:

Many people including these famous persons hold this name:

- Philippe Manoury (born 1952), French composer
- Michel-Joseph Maunoury (1847–1923), Marshal of France
- Simon Maunoury (born 1983), French badminton player

== See also ==
- Manoury Island

Famille Manoury
