= Volodymyr Nikityuk =

Ukrainian serial killer

- Born: 1970 (age 55–56); Volodymyr-Volynskyi, Volyn Oblast, Ukrainian SSR
- Other name: "The Oleksandriia Maniac"
- Convictions: Murder x3 Negligent homicide
- Penalty: 9 years imprisonment (1991); 15 years imprisonment (2008); Life imprisonment (2025)

Details
- Victims: 4–6
- Span of crimes: 1991–2016
- Country: Soviet Union, later Ukraine
- States: Volyn, Kirovohrad
- Date apprehended: For the final time on 16 August 2016

Volodymyr Nikityuk (Ukrainian: Володимир Никитюк; born 1970), is a Soviet–Ukrainian serial killer who committed at least three murders and one negligent homicide between 1991 and 2016 in Volyn and Kirovohrad Oblasts out of apparent religious mania. He was suspected in two additional murders, but was acquitted due to a lack of evidence.

The criminal case caused a public outcry due to the severity of the crimes, the religious motivations, and the long length from the beginning of the trial until its conclusion. After almost ten years, Nikityuk was convicted and sentenced to life imprisonment.

== Early life and first murders ==
Volodymyr Nikityuk was born in 1970 in Volodymyr-Volynskyi, Volyn Oblast. He had a sister. In the mid-1970s, his family moved to the village of Dolgonosy, where Nikityuk spent his childhood and youth. There, he was regarded negatively by everyone around him due to his apparent mental illness and hooliganistic activities. Among the latter was his cruelty to animals, attacking people for seemingly no reason, and setting fire to barns and houses of fellow villagers.

In 1991, Nikityuk got into a quarrel with a neighbor, after which he set fire to a neighbor's room in a dormitory. Unbeknownst to him, the fire caused a girl residing in the room to suffer from severe injuries, from which she eventually succumbed to in the hospital. Nikityuk was tried, convicted of negligent homicide, and sentenced to 9 years imprisonment.

After serving his sentence in full, he returned to Dolgonosy, where he continued to terrorize the locals. According to local residents, he would walk down the street, spot a goat or a chicken, and then pounce on them and simply gut them with a knife. At the end of 2000, he was suspected of robbing a local pharmacy, whose medicines were later found in the river, but no conclusive evidence of his involvement in the crime was found.

In 2001, Nikityuk murdered 16-year-old Ruslana Knyzh from the village of Liublynets. He waited for the girl, who was studying in the city and had come home for the holidays, at the railway station, then attacked and beat her, inflicting severe traumatic injuries. The trial lasted seven years because while serving his original sentence, Nikityuk became fascinated with studying the Ukrainian criminal code and managed to delay the criminal case by filing numerous complaints and petitions. In 2008, he was found guilty and sentenced to 15 years imprisonment.

=== Religious conversion and early release ===
While serving his sentence at the Petrovskaya Maximum Security Penal Colony No. 49 in the Kirovohrad Oblast, Nikityuk visited psychologist Sergei Botarenko and attended religious services regardless of denomination or creed. At the same time, he constantly wrote something in his notebook, where he made notes and worshipped various Pagan gods such as Svarog, Dazhbog and Perun. Aside from celebrating pagan religious holidays, Nikityuk also told others that he believed in a "living god", but never explained what he meant by that.

In February 2016, Nikityuk was granted early release following the passage of the Savchenko Law. However, instead of returning home, he decided to stay in Kirovohrad, where he was sheltered by a Pentecostal group. Not long after, a series of murders and disappearances involving children and teenagers began.

== Serial murders ==
=== Suspected victims ===
In regards to all the confirmed and suspected murders, Nikityuk targeted children and teenagers as victims, always on a Pagan holiday. The first suspected murder took place on the evening 1 May 2016, during the Easter celebrations or what coincidentally was also Zhivin Day according to the Pagan calendar. On that date, 15-year-old Sofia Buts went to a disco in her home village of Pantaivka, where she was last seen near a local store saying goodbye to her friends at around 10 PM. When she failed to return on the following day, her parents reported her as missing and a search operation was initiated to locate her. Despite the combined efforts of the local police, volunteers and villagers who combed through the nearby forests and bodies of water, they were unable to locate Buts initially.

Her skeletal remains were found five months later on 22 October 2016 in the nearby forest, when mushroom pickers accidentally stumbled upon her skull. A more in-depth search led to the recovery of other bones and half-decayed articles of clothing, which were positively identified as belonging to Buts by her relatives. This was confirmed on 13 January 2017, when DNA concluded that the remains were indeed those of Buts. After this discovery, relatives and villagers stated that they had seen the bones near a passageway close to a trail when they searched for the girl back in May 2016, suggesting that the remains were purposefully moved there.

Another suspected victim was 12-year-old Ilya Makarov, who went missing on 22 May 2016 in the city of Oleksandriia, during the celebration of the Translation of the Relics of Saint Nicholas from Myra to Bari, or, alternatively, Yarilin Day according to the Pagan calendar. On the day of his disappearance, the boy left home and was going to play with friends in the courtyard of a neighboring apartment building, but he never made it there. Makarov was last seen alive near the Secondary School No. 8.

When he did not return home, his parents contacted the police, who immediately began searching for him with the help of volunteers. As with the Buts case, searchers combed through the nearby woodlands, abandoned buildings, basements, attics, and the riverbank, but no trace of Makarov was ever found. His ultimate fate is unknown, but according to investigators, he fell victim to the so-called "Oleksandriia Maniac".

=== Confirmed victims ===
Nikityuk's first confirmed murder took place on the night of 6–7 July 2016, during the celebrations for Kupala Night. The victim was 21-year-old Daria Ozarko, who lived in Oleksandriia with her grandmother while he mother worked abroad. On the night of her death, she, along with her friend Alla and her boyfriend, went to a local beach to attend a party. Around midnight, her two companions went off to dance, leaving her alone.

When they returned, Ozarko was gone, so Alla attempted to call her, only to hear her cellphone ringing from some nearby bushes. Alla and her boyfriend followed the sound, whereupon they found the body of Ozarko. An autopsy concluded that she had been beaten to such a severe degree that the killer had fractured her skull in several places. Since there were no signs of sexual assault or missing valuables, investigators were unable to determine a motive for the murder.

The second confirmed victim was 13-year-old Stanislav Boiko, a resident of Oleksandriia who disappeared on 1 August 2016 after telling his parents he was going for a walk. On the following morning – during the celebration of Prophet Elijah's Day or the Festival of Perun – the boy's completely naked corpse was found floating in the Inhulets river by two fishermen. An autopsy concluded that, similarly to Ozarko, he had beaten so severely that he suffered extensive trauma to the brain, multiple fractures, and was evidently strangled with a rope. The coroner determined that when the perpetrator threw Boiko into the river, the victim was still alive, but quickly succumbed to his injuries.

== Arrest, investigation, and trial ==
=== Arrest and investigation ===
On 16 August 2016, Nikityuk was arrested for a robbery he committed on the evening of 10 July in Shakhtyor Park. In that case, the victim was a young woman who managed to escape him and later identified the assailant as Nikityuk. By order of the Oleksandriia District Court, he was remanded in custody for 60 days, after which a search was conducted in one of the abandoned houses near City Hospital No. 1, where Nikityuk was residing. During the search, officers found personal belongings of some of the recent murder vicitms, most notably Daria Ozarko's purse, which contained deodorant, bandages, and wet wipes. Investigators also took note of a calendar marked with the date of the murders, taking interest of an additional date marked "17 August" with the address of "6 Belinskiy Street" on it. It was surmized that Nikityuk planned another attack for that date, but was prevented due to his capture.

After his arrest, a blood sample was taken from Nikityuk for genetic and molecular analysis of epithelial particles found under the fingernails of 13-year-old Stanislav Boiko. The results conclusively proved that the particles matched Nikityuk. In addition, it was established that Boiko's SIM card was inserted into Nikityuk's mobile phone on the eve of his death. This also indicated direct contact between the murdered child and Nikityuk, although he denied it.

Ultimately, he was solely charged with the murders of Boiko and Daria Ozorko, as well as robbery and attempted murder. No obvious evidence of his involvement in the cases of Sofia Buts and Ilya Makarov due to the inability to establish the girl's cause of death or the absence of any remains linked to Makarov. Despite this, Makarov's mother believed Nikityuk was responsible due to the fact that a baseball cap similar to the one he was wearing was found at Nikityuk's home, and that the boy had been recorded on CCTV accompanying a man similar to Nikityuk. In the end, the two cases were separate from the other murders.

At the end of 2016, Nikityuk underwent a forensic psychiatric exam, and was found sane to stand trial. Said trial began on 31 January 2017, with the prosecutor being Oleksandr Polyanskyi from the Kirovohrad Regional Prosecutor's Office.

=== Trial delays ===
During preliminary questioning, Nikityuk refused to admit guilt in the murders, but also failed to provide an alibi for himself. He only admitted that he was indeed a Pagan and that he adhered to the "Maga Vera" religious movement. He also indicated that approximately 1,000,000 hryvnia had been collected for his trial, but did not specify who provided him with the funds or why.

From the very first court hearing, Nikityuk tried to delay the trial by demanding the recusal of prosecutors and judges, as well as answers to more than 100 questions he had submitted concerning the investigation proceedings. In all of his subsequent hearings, the court attendees were forced to deal with his erratic behavior – running around his cage and then freezing up; refusing to answer questions; interrupting loudly when others were speaking; making comments or clarifications when he was not asked, and getting into arguments with media correspondents over whether they were or weren't allowed to take pictures of him.

He also meticulously questioned the prospective jurors about their religious beliefs, and if he did not like their answers, he demanded that the candidate be dismissed. Nikityuk also caused numerous scandals and repeatedly filed motions and complaints about the supposed unlawful actions undertaken by the police and requesting additional forensic testing. At one hearing, when the prosecutor was reading the indictment, Nikityuk scratched his ear, then demanded an ambulance to be called and claimed to have not heard the indictment, thus forcing the prosecutor to read it all anew. Besides this, he also regularly accused the authorities of corruption and demanded punishment for them and the Prosecutor's Office; demanded that polygraph tests be administered to the prosecution witnesses; baselessly claimed to have been tortured; demanded the presence of legal observers, and wanted to have 25 personal items seized during the search to be returned, including underwear and amulets.

At all hearings, when the judges retired to the deliberation room due to Nikityuk's challenges, he eagerly addressed those present in the courtroom in an attempt to manipulate them and elicit sympathy for himself, calling the trial "the most grandiose scam of the century". He claimed that the actual killers were an unnamed police officer and the drivers of an ambulance registered to another region of the country, who supposedly went around Kirovohrad and killed the victims to harvest and traffick their organs. At the end of 2017, prosecutor Polyanskyi stated due to the charges and the defendant's behavior, the trial could continue for at the very least three more years.

On 31 August 2017, Nikityuk was brought to the court with visible injuries, disrupting the court session and demanded another postponement with the allegations that he was beaten by employees at the Kropyvnytskyi Pretrial Detention Center. The regional prosecutor's office opened criminal proceedings for the charges of intentional minor bodily injury, but it was later established that the injuries were caused by a fellow prisoner at his request. In November of that year, he nearly disrupted the hearing again after managing to bring a dildo into the courtroom. At the hearing, Nikityuk claimed that the dildo had been given to him by employees at the detention center in response to his request for his watch to be returned, after which they supposedly filmed him with the item in his hands and laughed at him. However, Judge Galina Kolyush refused to interrupt the proceedings and continued to examine the written proceedings. She later advised Nikityuk, through his lawyer, that this specific complaint should be addressed to the management of the detention center and the Prosecutor's Office, not to the court.

=== Media blackout and verdict ===
On 3 July 2018, at a regular meeting, the prosecutor read out the materials of Volume 6 of the criminal case. After said hearing, the prosecutor and the judge told the media that the criminal case consisted of 14 volumes, after which the questioning of the victims would begin, followed by the examination of material evidence, the questioning of more than 300 witnesses, and then the examination of the defendant's testimony, which would likely take several more years.

For unknown reasons, starting in 2019, both the media and law enforcement agencies stopped covering the trial hearings. The trial itself was close to completion in 2022, but was further delayed due to the Russo-Ukrainian war. During this period, Nikityuk continued to file complaints against the prosecutor and the judge, accusing the police of torture and covering up for a supposed organized criminal group of organ traffickers, underground gamblers, and drug traffickers. He subsequently attempted to appeal the refusal to initiate criminal proceedings against his perceived "enemies", but was denied.

In December 2025, the Oleksandriia District Court finally convicted Nikityuk of the murders of Ozarko and Boiko, and sentenced him to life imprisonment. The decision was officially confirmed by the Office of the Prosecutor General on 26 December 2025.

=== Unrelated serial killer ===
In 2005, 11 years before the ritual murders, the media and law enforcement agencies nicknamed an unrelated serial killer "The Oleksandriia Maniac" after he murdered at least seven young girls and women in the city between 1998 and 2005. The perpetrator was a local born in 1959 who, after divorcing his second wife in 1997, started working as a private driver and then officially got a job at a taxi company. He then used this to pick up potential victims off the streets or at public transport stops, lulling them into a false sense of security while driving them to an isolated area, where he would rape and kill them.

In October 2006, this man was sentenced to life imprisonment by the Kirovohrad Regional Court of Appeal. In various sources, he was given the fictitious names of "Andrei Rybin" and "Valeriy Akulov", but his real name has never been made public.

== See also ==
- List of serial killers by country
