= Cook Summit =

Mountain in Antarctica

Cook Summit (64°24′S 62°24′W) is the highest peak in the Solvay Mountains, Brabant Island, rising to 1,590 metres (5,220 ft) between Galen Peak and Celsus Peak. It was named by the UK Antarctic Place-Names Committee in 1986 after Dr. Frederick A. Cook, an American polar explorer and surgeon with the Belgian Antarctic Expedition, 1897–99, led by Lieutenant Adrien de Gerlache.
