= Paprat =

Paprat Папрат
- Village
- Location within Bulgaria
- Coordinates: 41.5167°N 25.2833°E
- Country: Bulgaria
- Province: Kardzhali Province
- Municipality: Dzhebel
- Time zone: UTC+2 (EET)
  - Summer (DST): UTC+3 (EEST)

Paprat is a village in Dzhebel Municipality, Kardzhali Province, southern Bulgaria.

== Honours ==
Paprat Peak on Brabant Island, Antarctica is named after the village.
