= Veles (god) =

Slavic god of earth, waters and the underworld

Veles/Volos
- Abode: Nav, Slavic afterlife
- Weapon: spear
- Animals: wolf, bear, snake, owl
- Symbol: willow
- Festivals: The Festival of Veles

Equivalents
- Christian: Saint Blaise, Saint Nicholas
- Greek: Hades, Hermes
- Hindu: Varuna
- Indo-European: *Welnos
- Norse: Odin, Loki,
- Slavic: Triglav, Chernobog, Chernoglav (possibly)
- Prussian: Peckols

Modern symbol of Veles, used by Rodnovers

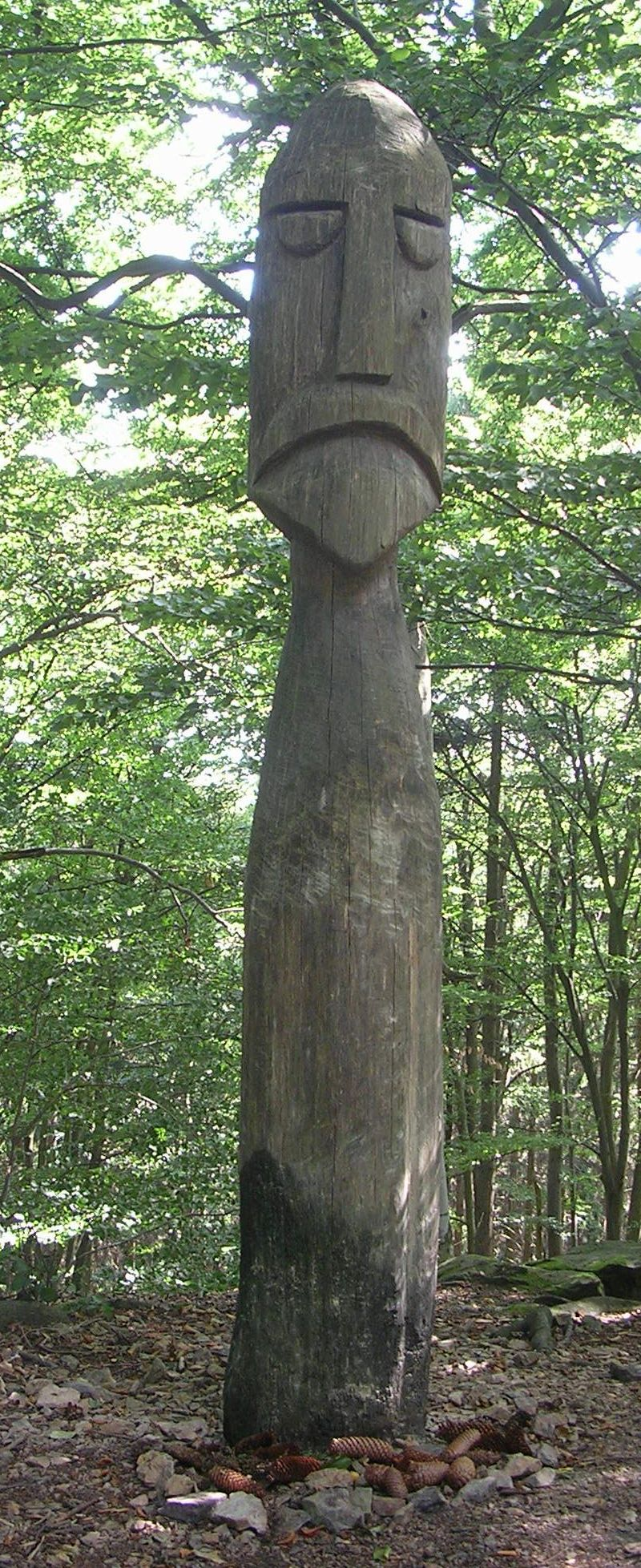
The modern statue of Veles on Velíz mountain, Czech Republic

Veles, (Note: Bulgarian, Macedonian, Russian, Serbo-Croatian Cyrillic, Ukrainian: Велес; Polish: Weles, Wołos; Serbo-Croatian Latin, Czech, Slovak, Slovene: Veles; Old Church Slavonic and Pannonian Rusyn: Велесъ; Belarusian: Вялес, romanized: Vialies) also known as Volos, is a chthonic god of the underworld in Slavic mythology, described in contemporary sources as a cattle god (skotij bogъ), but according to various hypotheses, he had a much broader sphere of influence. His function as protector of cattle may be connected to both wealth and rule of the underworld, which was imagined as a pasture where human souls grazed. Through comparative methods, he can be interpreted as a deity of magic, knowledge, divination, and poetry. As the guardian of the boundary between the world of the living and the dead, he was also a god of the wilderness, hunting and animals. He was also a guarantor of oaths, punishing their violation by "turning them yellow", most likely a metaphor for a form of jaundice.

His mythological nature and powers are similar, though not entirely identical, to those of Varuna, Velnias, Odin (marginally), Hermes, Afsati and Hades. Reconstructionists speculate that he may directly continue aspects of the Proto-Indo-European pantheon with the original deity Welnos.

Veles is sometimes incorrectly identified with a dragon or a serpent. This hypothesis, based on the reconstruction by Ivanov and Toporov and published in 1974, was already criticized eight years later by A. Giezstor, and it is no longer part of the modern scholarly consensus on Slavic mythology. "There is no adduced evidence, either by Ivanov, Toporov, or Katičić, of the existence of formula Perun smites the god Veles, as the indisputable proof (instead of mere conjecture), which is to be expected by an objective explorer." Toporov later revisited this issue and recognized the association of Veles with Varuṇa instead of the demon Vṛtra, contrary to his earlier position. "The very name Varuṇa has been compared by scholars with the Hittite sea deity Aruna, with the ancient Greek sky god Ouranos, and finally with the Slavic Volos (Veles) and the Lithuanian Velnias, among others. Therefore, despite a number of remaining uncertainties, the Indo-European parallels of this name are beyond doubt."

== Sources ==
Veles is one of few Slavic gods for which evidence of offerings can be found in all Slavic nations.

Part of the oldest chronicle of Kievan Rus the Primary Chronicle (lit. 'Tale of Bygone Years') are three treaties between Byzantium and Rus’. They date from 907 (with Oleg), 945 (with Igor), and 971 (with Sviatoslav). Only the last one does not raise significant doubts about its authenticity:

"As I have sworn to the Greek emperors, and with me the boyars and all Rus’, so shall we uphold the true treaty. And if we do not fulfill anything of what has been stated above, I and those who are subject to me, may we be cursed by our god in whom we believe, by Perun and by Volos, the cattle god (skotij bogъ), and may we become yellow as gold, and may we be cut down by our own weapons. Hold this to be true, for we have now bound ourselves to you by it, have written it upon this charter and sealed it with our seals…"

Veles is here referred to as the “cattle god” (skotij bog). This is theorized to reflect his role in governing prosperity, particularly in the form of cattle, which was a meter of wealth in most Indo-European cultures. However, because he is mentioned in contrast to Perun, this reference may be mythological, our god x cattle god, reflecting his authority over all that lies "outside the fences of human dwellings", in other words the wilderness, as opposed to Perun, the "god of the people". The fact that both are guarantors of this treaty could further support the argument for a possible close similarity between this pair in the sense of Mitra – Varuna, as bright – dark upholders of law. After all, Perun displays sun-like characteristics in folk religion and symbolism, which could align him more closely with Mithra. This is not unusual, as the Celtic thunder god Taranis exhibits comparable traits. And Varuna is a clear cognate of Veles. "Only the character of the Vedic sovereign god Varuna appears to be fully congruent with the Slavic god in all his aspects, features and functions." The work "Slovo někojego christoljubca, revnitelya po pravoi věre" ("The Word of a Certain Christ-Lover, Zealous for the True Faith") most likely dated from the 11th or 12th century. The oldest surviving manuscripts of this work are apparently in the Pajsievsky Codex, the Trinity Golden Chain, and the Sofia Codex. Volos, however, is mentioned only in the Trinity Golden Chain. The work is anonymous and its main purpose is to criticize surviving fragments of pre-Christian religion. Because Slovo někojego christoljubca contains descriptions of certain practices and names of revered figures, it becomes an important testimony to the archaic religion of the Slavs, which the author sought to eradicate. The passage mentioning Veles (or Volos) reads as follows:

"Therefore, for Christians it is inappropriate to play demonic games or dance, to make music, sing demonic songs, or offer sacrifices to idols, in which they pray in drying houses to fire and to the fairies and Mokosh, Sima, Rglu, and Perun and Volos, the cattle god, to Rod and the Rozhanitsy, and to all those who are like them."

The problem, however, is that the sequence crucial for us occurs in only one of the SNCh manuscripts, and therefore it seems likely that it is an interpolation from the text of the treaty in the TBG. Another source is the Žitije Vladimira ("Life of Vladimir"), which exists in several variants. The mention of Volos is connected to his actions carried out during the Christianization of Kiev.

"Once [Vladimir] arrived in Kiev, he commanded that the idols be cut down, ordering some to be chopped and others to be burned. He commanded that the idol of Volos, whom they called the cattle god, be thrown into the Pochaiv River [...]"

This passage is often examined with regard to the position of Veles’s idol, which, unlike the others, was not placed on a sacred mound as mentioned in connection with Vladimir’s pantheon. The lower placement of Veles’s idol is explained in relation to the chthonic function of this god, in contrast to Perun, who was a sky deity. At the same time, Veles being lower in the city could place him closer to the marketplace, and thus this may reflect a connection to his attribute associated with wealth and potentially trade.

This destruction of Volos’s idol does not appear in any of these sources or in any other known text, and could therefore be a later addition. Considering that the rest of the text demonstrably draws on older sources, Šachmatov’s assumption seems more natural: that the author of obyčnoje ŽV had access to a source that has not survived. Therefore, the information about Volos from ŽV can be considered relevant, albeit with a certain degree of caution.

Veles is also mentioned in the heroic epic The Tale of Igor’s Campaign from the late 12th century in connection with the bard Bojan as his grandfather:

"Oh Bojan, singer of long-past times,

[...] Grandson of Veles, you could adorn Igor’s deeds with richer tones:

[...]Grandson of Veles, you would sing perhaps: [...]"

Among Western Slavs, in Czech sources, the name Veles was used to refer to a devil or demon.^{(see below)} The Polish chronicler Mikołaj Stryjkowski, at the end of the 16th century, calls him Vlos and describes him as a god of cattle and forests, comparable to Pan and Faunus.

For the South Slavs the name of Veles appears only in toponyms, the best-known of which is the city of Veles in Macedonia, over which looms a hill of St. Elias the Thunderer. Other examples are Veles in Western Serbia, Velesnica on the Danube and Velestovo in Montenegro and also the township of Velestino (Βελεστίνο, today Φέρες), apparently bearing testimony to a Slavic layer in the settlement of Thessaly. Another debatable if not improbable example is the town of Volosko in Croatia, situated on the seashore under the peak of Mount Učka, nicknamed Perun.

== Etymology ==
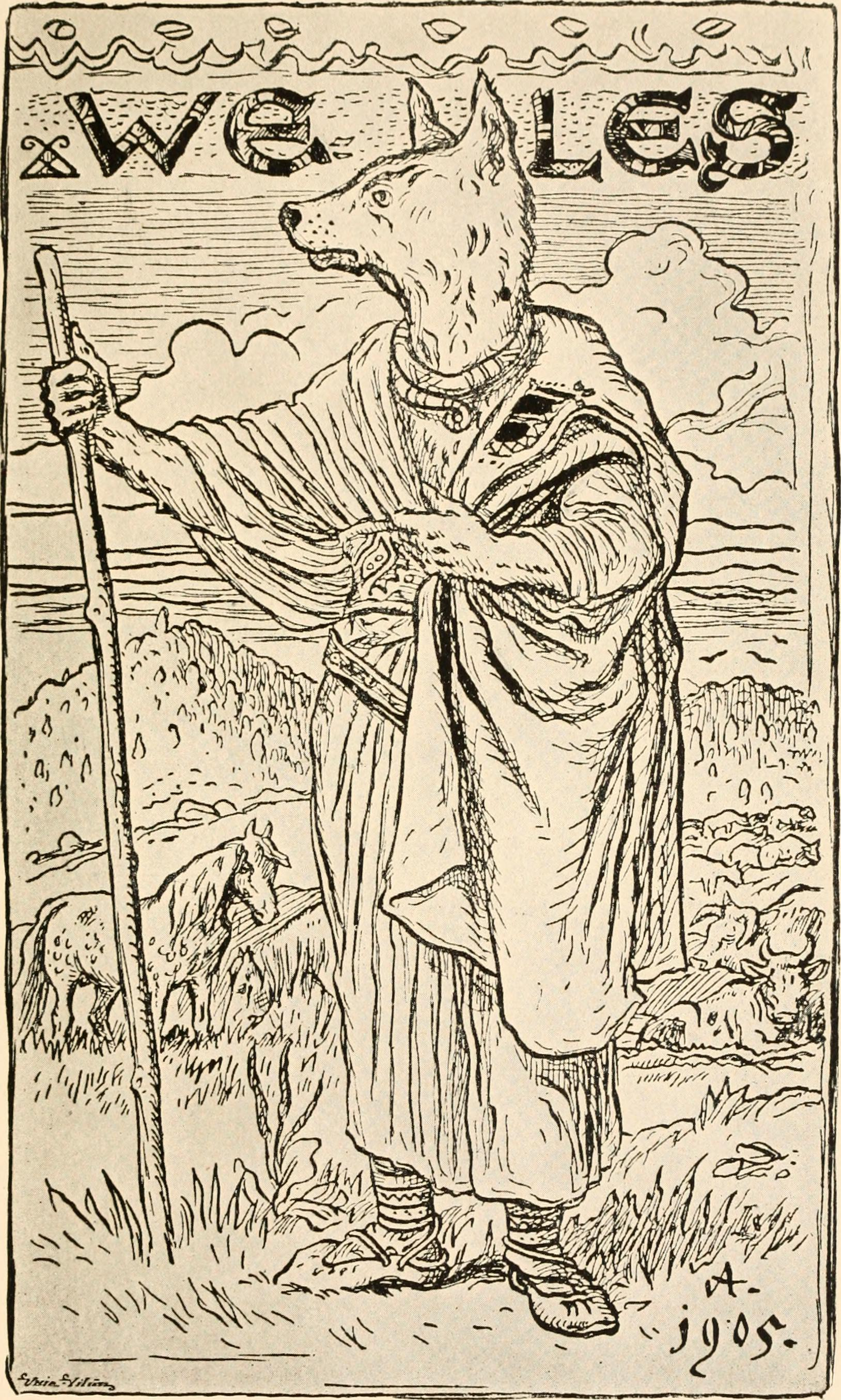
"Weles" in wolf form, from The Mythology of All Races (1918).

Presumably it is not possible to conclusively determine a definite etymology for the name of the god Veles, though there are several Proto-Indo-European roots that are all closely related to the nature of Veles and his domains. Further complicating matters is the presence of Lithuanian vėlės, which Fraenkel claims is unrelated to the Slavic term. Moreover, it remains to be determined what the original shape of the lemma was in early Slavic, which obfuscates its history and linguistic relationships.

The identification of Veles and Volos as one and the same was considered entirely unproblematic by Roman Jakobson. He argued that the name Veles can be divided into two parts: the first is based on the Indo-European (IE) root *ṷel- (*wel-), the second on the IE root *esu- (from PIE *h₂nsú-, "ruler > god"; cf. Vedic asura-, Avestan Ahura-, Old Norse áss). According to Jakobson, the variant name Volos can be derived by assuming that the second root appeared in the zero grade and that a regular sound change from -el- to -olo- subsequently occurred. The connection of the second part of the name with the PIE root from which asura developed is particularly interesting because it is an epithet of the god Varuṇa, who can be linked with Veles on more than just an etymological level.

This root is fairly established and accepted in current scholarship. It encompasses several semantic fields: to die, grass, to see, to want, to turn (oneself), to tear, lukewarm; elsewhere, alongside "grass", we also find the possible meanings "hair", "wool", and "forest", as well as another meaning, "to deceive".

Mallory and Adams raise a question, whether PIE roots with several distinct meanings represent unrelated homonyms, or whether these meanings were once connected within a unified semantic field that has since become obscure. The question would be whether to associate Veles with all meanings of the root *ṷel- (*wel-), or to select only one. According to Gajdošíková Šebetovská and Jiří dynda, it is possible that some meanings are interconnected, while others are merely homonymous. However, attempting at all costs to find links between all meanings of the root *ṷel- and Veles could lead us astray, Gajdošíková Šebetovská adds.

Dynda lists the three reconstructed PIE roots dubbing it the "*wel- problem":

- a) ṷel- (*wel-) "to roll, to turn" – Czech vlna (wave/wool), úval (valley); Latin volvo ("to turn/rotate"), valles ("valley"); Greek ἕλιξ ("spiral/winding").
  - *ṷélsu- (*wélsu-) "meadow, pasture" > Greek Elysion (Elysium), a region of the underworld.
- b) u̯elh₁- (*welh₁-) "to choose, to want" – Czech vůle (will), volba (choice), velet (to command); Latin vollo; Gothic waljan; English will; German wählen.
- c) u̯elh_{3}- (*welh₃-) "to strike, to wage war" – Latin vello ("to pluck/tear"); Old English wéal ("bodies of the fallen"); Old Norse valr ("the fallen in battle"); Lithuanian vėlė and Latvian veļi ("souls of the dead").

Words semantically connected with the dead found in the Baltic sphere like Lithuanian vėlės, Latvian veļi (loosely transl. "souls of the dead") are associated with the figure of Velnias.

The meaning of the root ṷel- as “to see” is reflected, for example, in the prophetess Veleda mentioned by Tacitus, as well as in the Old Irish stratum associated with poetry and magic, fili. Another Veles etymological connecting is with the Old Russian class of seers and magicians known as volkhv, although this has not yet been confirmed and remains hypothetical.

Belaj's debated connection of *wel- to wave/wool is especially notable, since Veles is often reconstructed as the shepherd of the dead. Volos is also the Russian and Ukrainian word for "hair". Gieysztor notes, that hair/fur is regarded as connected to magic in IE mythology. However, since the early 20th century, since the advent of Proto-Indo-European laryngeal theory, the 'wool' word has been reconstructed as *h_{2}wĺ̥h_{1}neh_{2}.

The Proto-Indo-European root *welg- also means 'humid, wet'. Nothing is more connected with Veles than humidity and wetness. His domain is down, 'у воду пот корч пот колоду' ("in the water, below the tree stump and the log"). However, this etymology can be discounted, as there is no velar in Veles.

There is also the Indo-European word *woltus meaning 'meadow' which is derived from the same root. Accordingly, Veles is the shepherd of the dead who was imagined to browse the deceased on green lush meadows in the underworld. An ancient Russian word, Vlasezhelische, could refer to the place where Veles dwells, "the underground kingdom or an entrance to it".

The name is also related to Slavic terminology for oxen, for which the South Slavs, Russians, and Poles use "вол/vol/wół". Volos can also be a derivation from the same root by Eastern Slavic phonetic laws, now considered the most probable explanation for this phonetic form. Potentially one Baltic magical object, the “bone of the dead”, connected to the ancestor worship rites is in Latvian knows as, "vela kauls", and could share linguistic root with the name Veles. This name of the magical “bone of the dead”, differs across Baltic languages as they move closer to the Russian linguistic sphere: "naujos kaulis" (Samogitian), "navi-kaulis" (Lithuanian), "навья косточка" (nav’ya kostochka) (Russian). While a distant cognate, this “bone of the dead” involved in ancestral rites was not foreign to the Slavs, Old Czech "kost navná", nor was the “day of the dead” on which it took place. Further, if we continue looking for *wel- in the names of this “day of the dead” festival, we find one in one of the Ukrainian names for the holiday: Велик День (Velik Den’).

The constellation of the Pleiades is most likely connected with Veles in some Slavic languages, such as Old Russian Volosyni or Bulgarian Vlascite: "[...]the Pleiades in the Slavic tradition are related to the good Veles, whence their name Volosožari, Volosyni, Vlašići, etc."

Scholarship suggests a closer connection to characters of Baltic mythology, such as Lith. Velnias (Velinas) and Latv. Velns. Other cogantes of Veles through comparative mythology are: Vedic Varuṇa, Old Norse Ullr, Gallo-Roman Vellaunus/Belenus, and Hittite Walliš. Gajdošíková Šebetovská, in her study, also demonstrates the close connections and similarities between Veles and lower mythological beings such as the chort, the leshy, and the vodyanoy.

== Basic myth theory ==
The Russian philologists Vyacheslav Ivanov and Vladimir Toporov proposed the basic myth theory, a reconstruction based on their comparative study of Indo-European mythologies, primarily from Slavic and Baltic, especially Belarusian and Lithuanian, folkloric material. It was later rejected even by its own author Toporov. In terms of Slavic mythology, it conjectures the conflict between the two gods, Perun and Veles.

Their enmity is, according to them, Veles's theft of Perun's son, wife, or, usually, cattle. They present Veles, in the form of a serpent, who slithers from the caves of the underworld and coils up the Slavic world tree towards Perun's heavenly domain. Perun attacks Veles with his lightning bolts. Veles flees, hiding or transforming himself into trees, animals or people. In the end, he is killed by Perun and in this ritual death, whatever Veles stole is released in the form of rain falling from the skies. In this basic myth theory, is then explained the supposed ancient view of the cyclical changing of seasons through the year. The dry periods are interpreted as the chaotic results of Veles' thievery, with storms and lightning seen as divine battles. The ensuing rain was the triumph of Perun over Veles and the re-establishment of world order. Perun's place is up, high and dry and Veles' down, low and wet. Perun protects the equilibrium of the world, by smiting his supposed adversary with lightning and driving him back down into his place, the watery realm lying beneath the roots of the cosmic tree (axis mundi). Order thus restored, the two gods cease hostilities until the next time that Veles tries to crawl up into Perun's realm. The myth was reconstructed as cyclical, repeating itself each year. The death of Veles, according to them, was never permanent; he would reform himself as a serpent who would shed its old skin and would be reborn in a new body.

=== Rejection in modern academia ===
Only the general schema of the reconstruction was accepted by most researchers. Not the identification of the god Veles as the opponent of Perun, especially on the basis of comparison with the role of his Baltic relative, the Lithuanian Velnias, with whom Perkūnas fights, but also using other associations. This step was criticized by most researchers, including Leo Klejn and Igor M. Diakonoff. Although we can trace certain traces of an ambivalent, tense relationship between both of these deities, they in no way lead us to the conclusion that Veles was that demonic opponent of the storm god in the cosmological battle.

This Belarusian folklore text tells the story of a dialogue between God and the "Unclean One". The opponent is pursued by thunder and lightning and tries to hide beneath various living and non-living objects, his final refuge is only water:

God argued with the Unclean One:"

"I will kill you!"

"How will you kill me? I will hide."

"Where?"

"Under a human!"

"I will kill the human, forgive his sins – and kill you."

"I will hide under a horse."

"Then I will kill the horse, compensate the man on the spot – and kill you."

"But I will hide under a cow."

"I will kill the cow as well, compensate the master on the spot – and kill you."

"I will hide under a house."

"I will burn the house, compensate the man on the spot – and kill you."

"But I will hide under a tree; there you will not kill me."

I will smash the tree and kill you."

"But I will hide under a stone."

"I will break the stone and kill you."

"Then I will hide in the water, under a trunk, under a log."

"There is your place; stay there."

Thus, wherever thunder strikes, there God strikes the Unclean One.

This plot motif appears in various versions: the hero may be God, Perun (Pjarun), Thunder, the Prophet Elijah; the opponent may be the devil, a demon, a dragon, Zmey, Zmiuljan-tsar, Zmey Gorynych, and so on.

According to this folk legend Ivanov and Toporov reconstructed the general narrative scheme of the myth about the struggle between the thunder-wielding god and his opponent:

1. The storm god is located at the top of the world tree, in the sky, from where he looks out to the four cardinal directions;
2. His opponent, a zmej (dragon/serpent), is located at the roots of the world tree;
3. The zmej steals cattle (horned livestock) or people and hides them in a rock; the storm god smashes the rock and frees the cattle (or people);
4. The zmej, while fleeing from the storm god, hides behind various living beings (a human, a horse, a cow...) or behind a tree or a stone;
5. The storm god, on horseback or in a chariot, with his club kills/smashes his opponent’s hiding places;
6. After the defeat of the zmej, water (rain) appears; the zmej then hides in the underground waters.

Against the seasonal, non-definitive character of the thunder-lord’s victory over the opponent stands M. Téra, who says that this mythical battle relates primarily to cosmogony, to the creation of the world from chaos, and that seasonally it could only have been remembered. M. Ivankovic further supports the idea of cosmic creation, rather than a storm battle, using Vedic evidence presented by Kuiper:

"On the Vedic version of the myth, Kuiper remarks It has long been recognized by several students of Vedic mythology that the Rigvedic myth of Indra ’s combat with the dragon Vrtra has no bearing on natural phenomena such as thunderclouds and rain, but represents an Aryan myth of creation ...Indra while slaying the Vrtra- (viz. the power ofr esistance of the inert Chaos, residing on the primordial hill), at the same time splits the hill (girí -)... and Fire and Water (Agni and Soma) are forced to leave the undifferentiated world of inertia and to join the heavenly gods. Indra further separates Heaven and Earth, by which act a cosmic dualism of upper world (represented by Devas) and nether world (represented by Asuras) is constituted..."

M. Ivankovic, in his study, deconstructs the hypothesis of Ivanov, Toporov, and Katičić on the basis of the very Vedic sources that were claimed to support it.

J. Dynda proposes two kinds of oppositional relationships of Perun – Veles. According to the trifunctional arrangement of the pantheon and its internal relationships described by Dumézil it can be described in its two possible forms:

1. Either it is the relationship Perun – Veles as the type Mitra – Varuna, that is, opposition within the internal polarity of the I. function. This possibility basically corresponds to the vegetational interpretation of Golema (alternation of human and non-human in nature), otherwise this possibility was thought through the most especially by A. Gieysztor, who sees in Perun a Mitra-like figure.
2. Or Perun – Veles as the type Indra – Varuna, or Þór – Óðinn, which would represent a typical and insurmountable tension between a strong thunderer of the II. function (who moreover takes over competencies in the sphere of fertility, which fits both Perun and Þór) and a sovereign magical god of the I. function. Another modality, or rather a variant of this type of relationship would most likely be the type Indra – Vrtra (i.e., varunoid, serpent connected with Varuna, but not directly Varuna himself).

However probable the first (Ia vs. Ib), where they are both gods of the I. function, or the second (Ib vs. II), where Veles is god of the I. function and Perun of the II. function, possibility may adhere to us, the only certain thing is that they represent an important pair of prominent deities with deep Indo-European roots.

Gajdošíková Šebestovská comments that it is evident that one cannot agree with Ivanov and Toporov in the view that Veles functioned in Slavic mythology in the form of a serpent or dragon as the opponent of Perun. She explains it is impossible to imagine that an oath^{(see above)} would be sworn in the name of some zoomorphic chaos monster, moreover at the same time together with its opponent in a struggle of life and death.

Téra firmly rejects this hypothesis. He views labeling Veles as the opponent of the thunder-wielding god is somewhat categorical. "We have not a single piece of evidence that Veles fought Perun, and we know nothing about Veles’s draconic or serpentine nature." His connection to Vrtra is perhaps only etymological, though the link between Vrtra and the probable Veles counterpart in Indian mythology, Varuna, was already noted by M. Eliade.

The pair Vrtra–Varuna can, according to Eliade, be compared based on several shared features: etymology, association with waters (Vrtra "binds" the waters, seizing control over them and Varuna rules over the cosmic ocean), both are sorcerers, and both are primarily magical “binders”—divine terrifying forces, who bind and immobilize their opponents or the cosmic waters, returning them to an initial chaotic undifferentiation and immobility. Opposite these magical gods who spread passivity stands Indra, who frees the victims from the bonds of Vrtra and Varuna. To this extent, the two—magical god and demon—are similar. However, Eliade furter adds:

"We do not have an obvious right to push the comparison between Vrtra and Varuna too far. Yet undeniable is the structural affinity between Varuna, the “nocturnal,” “non-acting,” “sorcerer” who binds the guilty from a distance, and Vrtra, who “binds” the waters. The result of the activity of each is the “stopping” of life and the bringing of death, in one case on an individual level and in the other on a cosmic level."

As mentioned, in Indo-European mythology, there was a certain tension between gods of the first and second functions (Varuna vs. Indra, Óðinn vs. Þór), but gods of the first function were not negative heroes in the story of the dragon’s struggle with the thunder-wielding god. It can therefore hardly be claimed that Veles is the opponent of Perun. If a connection truly existed between the magical deities and the cosmic serpent, it was evidently more complex than presented by the authors of the myth in their attempt to assign every figure from the Slavic tradition to a specific role in their narrative. Non-Indo-European variants of the struggle often depict the Sun, the storm, or the sky god as the main hero—the obvious heir of the celestial deity, a role also held by Indo-European magical gods. If there was any connection between Veles and the dragon, it was likely secondary, and its deciphering must be carried out in a more rigorous manner. However, Ivanov and Toporov neither conducted such an analysis nor took into account the ambiguity of the position of serpents and dragons in the Slavic tradition. Another piece of evidence for a fight between Veles and Perun—namely, the Baltic version of the clash between Velnias and Perkūnas, can be rejected on the grounds that Velnias is present there already in a degraded form as the devil, and is therefore an unclean force, a similar process to which can also be observed in the post-christian transformation of Veles.

== God of magic and musicians ==
According to Ivanov and Toporov, Veles' portrayal as having a penchant for mischief is evident both from his role in the storm myth and in carnival customs of Koledari shamans. In his role as a trickster god, he is in some ways similar to both Greek Hermes and Scandinavian Loki. He was connected with magic. The word volhov, obviously derived from his name, in some Slavic languages still means sorcerer while in the 12th century Ruthenian epic The Tale of Igor's Campaign, the character of Boyan the wizard is called Veles' grandson. Veles was also believed to be protector of travelling musicians. For instance, in some wedding ceremonies of northern Croatia (which continued up to the 20th century), the music would not start playing unless the bridegroom, when making a toast, spilled some of the wine on the ground, preferably over the roots of the nearest tree. The symbolism of this is clear, even though forgotten long ago by those still performing it: the musicians will not sing until a toast is made to their patron deity.

== Post-Christian Veles ==
After the advent of Christianity, Veles was split into several different characters. As a chthonic god of the underworld and magic, he became identified with the Devil and ambiguous lower mythological beings such as the chort, the leshy, and the vodyanoy. His more benevolent sides were transformed to several Christian saints. As a protector of cattle, he became associated with Saint Blaise, popularly known among various Slavic nations as St. Vlaho, St. Blaz, or St. Vlasiy (Armenian: Սուրբ Վլասի; germ: Blasius; fr: Blaise; sp: San Blas; port: São Brás; it: San Biagio; Croat: sv. Blaž; eng: Blase; Greek: Άγιος Βλάσιος). In Yaroslavl, for example, the first church built on the site of Veles's pagan shrine was dedicated to St Blaise, for the latter's name was similar to Veles and he was likewise considered a heavenly patron of shepherds. As mentioned already, in many Eastern Slavic folk tales, he was replaced by St. Nicholas, probably because the popular stories of the saint describe him as a giver of wealth and a sort of trickster.

Similarly, in a western Slavic context, Veles' attributes were split between the devil and the saints. The former is evidenced by Old Czech references to Veles as a demon: "Jat se to[mu di]wym ky czert tie na mne poslal ja kyt jest czert moc nademnu dal ja kit jest czert aneb ky weles aneb ky zmek tie proti mne zbudil a nawedl." ("I marvel at who has sent the devil upon me, who has given the devil such power over me, who it is, the devil or weles or some zmek, that has stirred you up and set you against me."), "O nechmež již těch hříchuov u velesa!" ("Oh, let us leave these sins with veles already!"). A similar phrase is included in the czech translation of Book of Sirach from 1561: "Ženě své zlé toho by přál, aby divokou husí byla a někam k Velesu za moře zaletěla a věčně se domů nevrátila." ("He would wish for his bad wife, that she would be a wild goose and fly somewhere to veles over the see, and never returned home"). This has variously been interpreted as either referring to Veles as residing across the sea, or as a generic phrase where Veles is once again identified with the devil. However, in west Slavic folklore, the devil is not unanimously evil, and in many folk tales he appears as the helper of the protagonist, often being the wealth giver and aiding the hero in deceiving his enemies, and becoming a positive figure despite his continuing associations with punishing the souls of sinners.

Much less emphasis is put on the syncretism with Saint Nicholas, but it does appear regionally. In western Bohemia, there are multiple beliefs around this saint; according to local mythology, the Church of Saint Nicholas under Krudum used to have a magical baptism bowl, and several legends exist of people's food (primarily cheese) being changed to gold in the vicinity of the church. It was also believed to hold a mass for the spirits of the dead once per year

== Place names ==
- Veles Bastion on Brabant Island, Antarctica is named after the deity.
- Velež Mountain in Bosnia and Herzegovina
- Veles, North Macedonia, a town in North Macedonia
- Velestovo, Montenegro, a village in Montenegro
- Velestovo, Ohrid, a village in North Macedonia
- Volosko, a village in Croatia
- Veles (planet), an exoplanet orbiting HD 75898
- Velíz, a mountain in central Bohemia

== See also ==
- Chaoskampf, the battle between Indo-European thunder gods and their chaotic serpentine opponents
- Varuna (Vedic)
- Leshy, forest spirit in Slavic mythology
- Typhon, primordial serpent of Greco-Roman mythology
- Vritra, brother of Vala in Hindu myth and enemy of Indra; he steals Usas, the rivers/waters, and cattle, which Indra must free
- Volkhv, slavic wiseman, wizard, sorcerer, magus
- Book of Veles
