= Galen Peak =

Mountain in the Antarctic

Location of Brabant Island in the Antarctic Peninsula region.

Galen Peak (64°22′S 62°26′W) is a peak in Solvay Mountains 3 nautical miles (6 km) west of Buls Bay, standing at the south side of Hippocrates Glacier in the south part of Brabant Island in the Palmer Archipelago, Antarctica. It is separated from Stribog Mountains to the north by Aluzore Gap.

The peak was first mapped by the Belgian Antarctic Expedition under Gerlache, 1897–99. It was photographed by Hunting Aerosurveys Ltd in 1956–57, mapped from these photos in 1959, and named by the UK Antarctic Place-Names Committee for Galen, the most eminent Roman doctor of his time, author of numerous works on medicine, surgery and anatomy.

== Maps ==
- Antarctic Digital Database (ADD). Scale 1:250000 topographic map of Antarctica. Scientific Committee on Antarctic Research (SCAR). Since 1993, regularly upgraded and updated.
- British Antarctic Territory. Scale 1:200000 topographic map. DOS 610 Series, Sheet W 64 62. Directorate of Overseas Surveys, Tolworth, UK, 1980.
- Brabant Island to Argentine Islands. Scale 1:250000 topographic map. British Antarctic Survey, 2008.
