= Lehaie Point =

Lehaie Point (64°30′S 62°47′W) is the southwestern point of Hulot Peninsula, Brabant Island, in the Palmer Archipelago, Antarctica. It was discovered by the Belgian Antarctic Expedition, 1897–99, under Gerlache, and named after Monsieur Houzeau de Lehaie, a supporter of the expedition. The French Antarctic Expedition, 1903–05, under Jean-Baptiste Charcot, charted the point, substantially modifying its earlier cartographic representation.

== Maps ==
- Antarctic Digital Database (ADD). Scale 1:250000 topographic map of Antarctica. Scientific Committee on Antarctic Research (SCAR). Since 1993, regularly upgraded and updated.
- British Antarctic Territory. Scale 1:200000 topographic map. DOS 610 Series, Sheet W 64 62. Directorate of Overseas Surveys, Tolworth, UK, 1980.
- Brabant Island to Argentine Islands. Scale 1:250000 topographic map. British Antarctic Survey, 2008.

== See also ==
- Lehaie Point in Germany Language
