= Bulcke Finger =

Mountain in Antarctica

Bulcke Finger (64°28′S 62°37′W) is a prominent finger-like pinnacle, projecting from the western slopes of Mount Bulcke in the southern part of Brabant Island in the Palmer Archipelago. It was first seen and photographed by the Belgian Antarctic Expedition, 1897–99. It was photographed by Hunting Aerosurveys Ltd in 1956–57, and mapped from these photos in 1959. The name derives from association with Mount Bulcke and came into use among members of the Falkland Islands Dependencies Survey.

== Maps ==
- Antarctic Digital Database (ADD). Scale 1:250000 topographic map of Antarctica. Scientific Committee on Antarctic Research (SCAR). Since 1993, regularly upgraded and updated.
- British Antarctic Territory. Scale 1:200000 topographic map. DOS 610 Series, Sheet W 64 62. Directorate of Overseas Surveys, Tolworth, UK, 1980.
- Brabant Island to Argentine Islands. Scale 1:250000 topographic map. British Antarctic Survey, 2008.
