= Zlatia =

Zlatia, or Zlatiya may refer to:

- Zlatia (region), a plateau in Montana and Vratsa Provinces, Bulgaria
- Zlatia, Dobrich Province, a village in Dobrichka Municipality, Bulgaria
- Zlatia, Montana Province, a village in Valchedram Municipality, Bulgaria
- Zlatiya Glacier, Antarctica
