= Larvik Harbour =

Bay in Antarctica

Larvik Harbor (64°29′S 62°27′W) is a small bay southwest of Lagrange Peak in southeastern Brabant Island, Palmer Archipelago, Antarctica. The bay was roughly charted by a British expedition, 1920–22, and so named after the town of Larvik in southern Norway, following the name usage of whalers (M.C. Lester's amendments to Captain Johans Johannessen's manuscript chart of about 1919–20).

== Maps ==
- Antarctic Digital Database (ADD). Scale 1:250000 topographic map of Antarctica. Scientific Committee on Antarctic Research (SCAR). Since 1993, regularly upgraded and updated.
- British Antarctic Territory. Scale 1:200000 topographic map. DOS 610 Series, Sheet W 64 62. Directorate of Overseas Surveys, Tolworth, UK, 1980.
- Brabant Island to Argentine Islands. Scale 1:250000 topographic map. British Antarctic Survey, 2008.
