= Buragara Cove =

Cove in the Palmer Archipelago, Antarctica

Location of Brabant Island in the Antarctic Peninsula region.

Buragara Cove (Bulgarian: залив Бурагара, ‘Zaliv Buragara’ \'za-liv bu-ra-'ga-ra\) is the 2.08 km wide cove indenting for 1.4 km the west coast of Brabant Island in the Palmer Archipelago, Antarctica. It is part of Dallmann Bay, entered northeast of Zabel Point and southwest of Devene Point. The feature was formed near the start of the 21st century as a result of the retreat of Rush Glacier, which feeds its head.

The cove is named after the ancient Roman station of Buragara in Western Bulgaria.

== Location ==
Buragara Cove is centred at 64°22′50″S 62°37′30″W.

== Maps ==
- Antarctic Digital Database (ADD). Scale 1:250000 topographic map of Antarctica. Scientific Committee on Antarctic Research (SCAR). Since 1993, regularly upgraded and updated.
- British Antarctic Territory. Scale 1:200000 topographic map. DOS 610 Series, Sheet W 64 62. Directorate of Overseas Surveys, Tolworth, UK, 1980.
- Brabant Island to Argentine Islands. Scale 1:250000 topographic map. British Antarctic Survey, 2008.
