= Jenner Glacier =

Glacier in Palmer Archipelago, Antarctica

- Location of Brabant Island in the Antarctic Peninsula region

- Location within Antarctica
- Location: Palmer Archipelago
- Coordinates: 64°27′S 62°35′W
- Length: 3 nmi (6 km; 3 mi)
- Thickness: unknown
- Terminus: Duperré Bay
- Status: unknown

Jenner Glacier (64°27′S 62°35′W) is a glacier 3 nautical miles (6 km) long flowing southwest from the Solvay Mountains between Paprat Peak and Kondolov Peak into the eastern arm of Duperré Bay, in the southern part of Brabant Island in the Palmer Archipelago, Antarctica.

The glacier was shown on an Argentine government chart in 1953, but not named. Photographed by Hunting Aerosurveys Ltd in 1956–57, and mapped from these photos in 1959, it was named by the UK Antarctic Place-Names Committee for Edward Jenner, an English physician who was a pioneer of preventive medicine, and who instituted the use of cowpox vaccine in smallpox vaccination.

== See also ==
- List of glaciers in the Antarctic
- Glaciology

== Maps ==
- Antarctic Digital Database (ADD). Scale 1:250000 topographic map of Antarctica. Scientific Committee on Antarctic Research (SCAR). Since 1993, regularly upgraded and updated.
- British Antarctic Territory. Scale 1:200000 topographic map. DOS 610 Series, Sheet W 64 62. Directorate of Overseas Surveys, Tolworth, UK, 1980.
- Brabant Island to Argentine Islands. Scale 1:250000 topographic map. British Antarctic Survey, 2008.
