= Celsus Peak =

Mountain in Antarctica

Celsus Peak (64°25′S 62°26′W) is a peak 2 nautical miles (4 km) west of D'Ursel Point in the southern part of Brabant Island, in the Palmer Archipelago. It was first mapped by the Belgian Antarctic Expedition, 1897–99, under Adrien de Gerlache. It was photographed by Hunting Aerosurveys Ltd in 1956–57, mapped from these photos in 1959, and named by the UK Antarctic Place-Names Committee for Aulus Cornelius Celsus, a Roman encyclopedist of the 1st century AD known for his medical work De Medicina. The estimated terrain elevation above sea level is 712 metres.

== Maps ==
- Antarctic Digital Database (ADD). Scale 1:250000 topographic map of Antarctica. Scientific Committee on Antarctic Research (SCAR). Since 1993, regularly upgraded and updated.
- British Antarctic Territory. Scale 1:200000 topographic map. DOS 610 Series, Sheet W 64 62. Directorate of Overseas Surveys, Tolworth, UK, 1980.
- Brabant Island to Argentine Islands. Scale 1:250000 topographic map. British Antarctic Survey, 2008.
