= Gand Island =

Island in Schollaert Channel, Antarctica

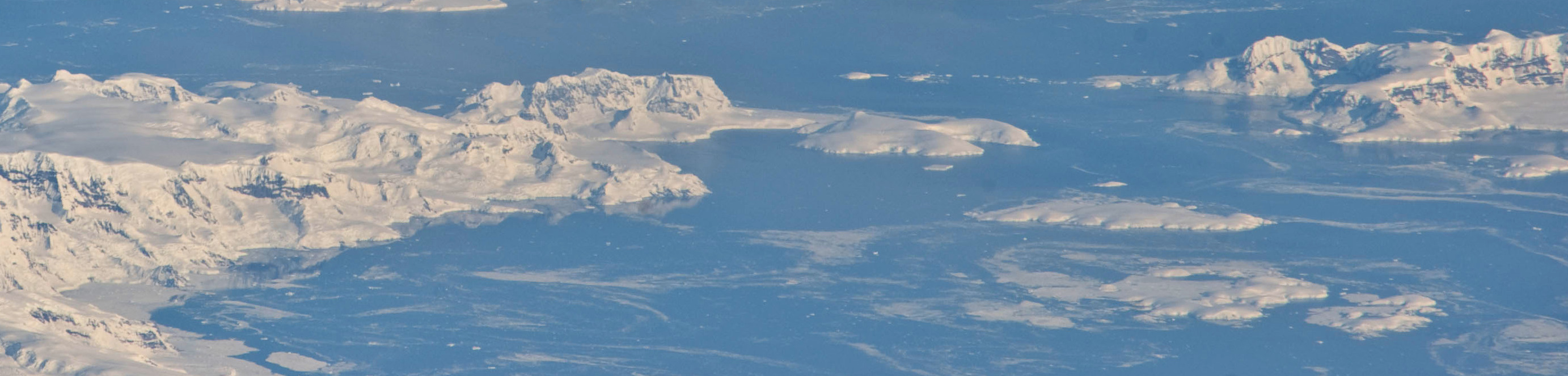
- Brabant Island (Mount Beddie), Dallmann Bay, Gand Island and Melchior Islands (photo from ISS)

- Location in Antarctica

Geography
- Location: Antarctica
- Coordinates: 64°24′S 62°51′W
- Archipelago: Palmer Archipelago

Administration
- Administered under the Antarctic Treaty System

Demographics
- Population: Uninhabited

Gand Island, also Ghent Island or Genteiland in Dutch is an ice-covered island, 3 nautical miles (6 km) long and 1.5 nautical miles (3 km) wide, lying at the north end of Schollaert Channel, between Anvers Island and Brabant Island in the Palmer Archipelago. It was discovered by the Belgian Antarctic Expedition, 1897–99, and named by Adrian de Gerlache after "Gand", the French form of Ghent, a city in Belgium where subscription drives were held to help finance the expedition.

== See also ==
- List of Antarctic and sub-Antarctic islands
