= Festival of Veles =

Holiday in honor of the Slavic god Veles

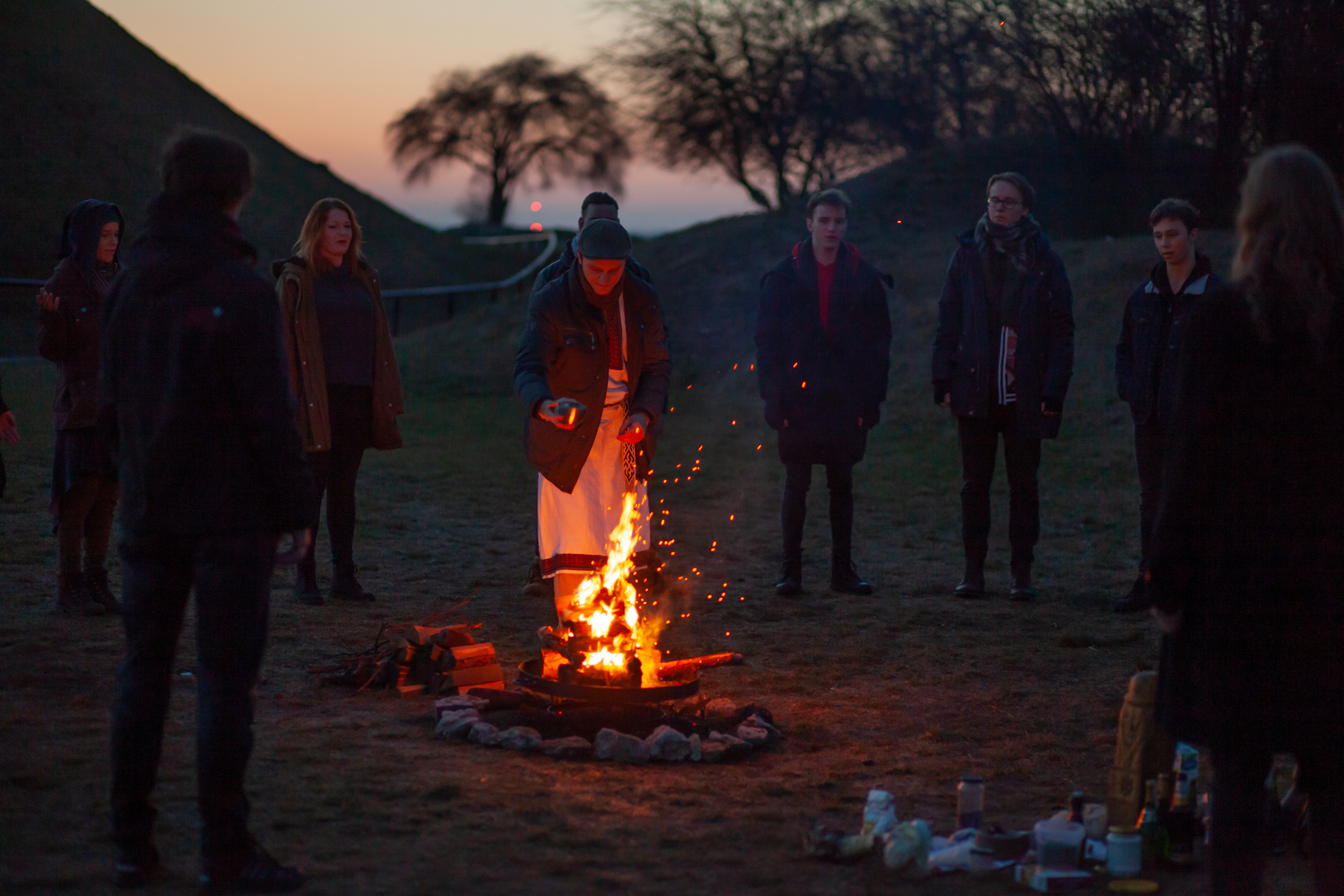
- Rite in honor of Veles in Kraków, 2020
- Observed by: Slavic people
- Type: Ethnic
- Significance: celebration of midwinter
- Date: 11 or 24 February
- Related to: Veles (god)

Festival of Veles (Veles' Day) is a holiday in honor of the Slavic god Veles, celebrated by rodnovers in February.

== Origin of the holiday ==
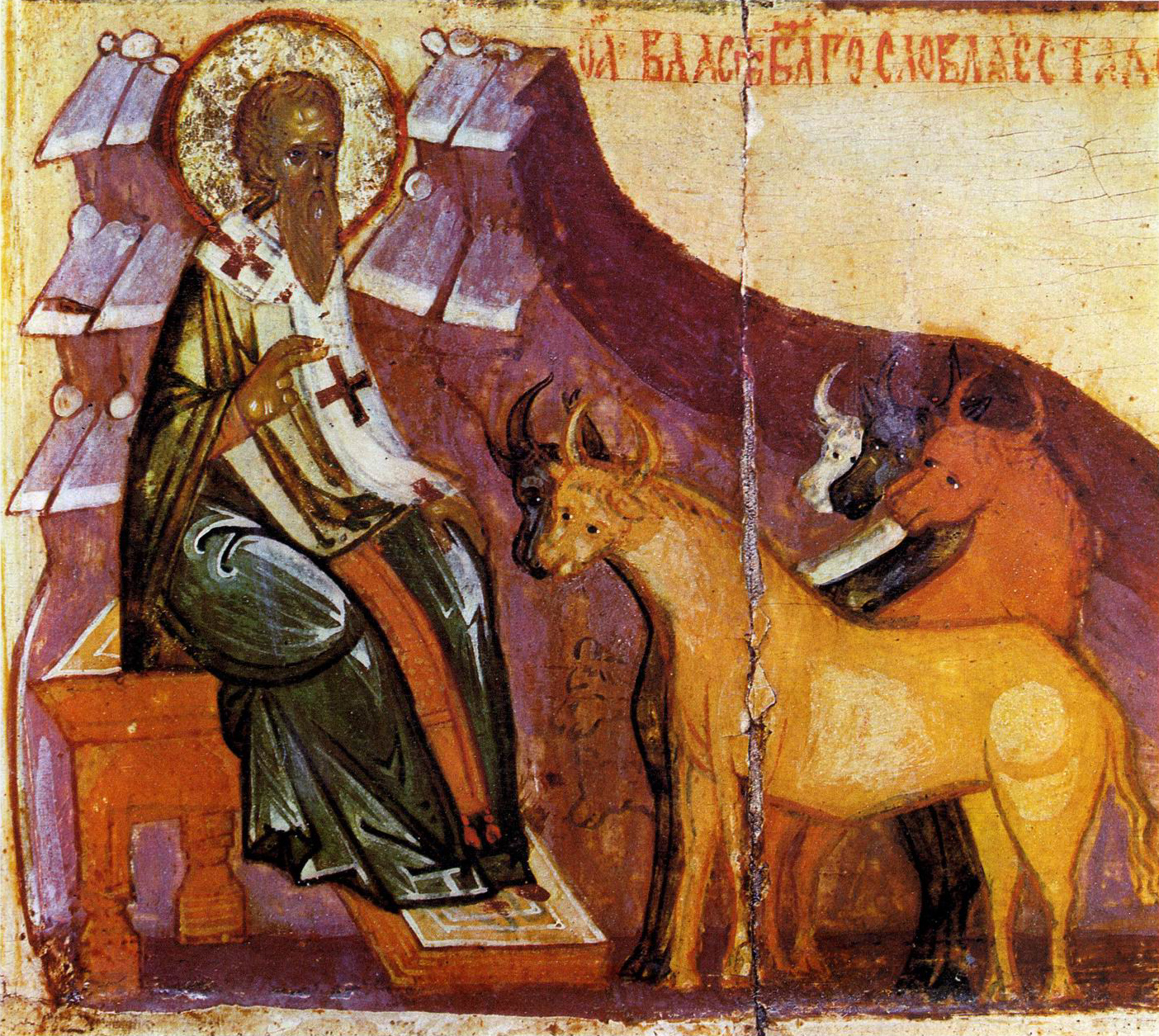
Saint Blaise with the cattle

Like other Slavic neopagans' holidays, the day of Veles is based on folklore. In Christian folk rituals, the festival of Veles corresponds to the "day of Saint Blaise". In the Orthodox tradition, St. Blaise is the protector of cattle, and his feast falls on 11/24 February; (Note: The double dating is due to the difference between the Julian (earlier date) and Gregorian (later date) calendars.) it is also believed that he wins over Winter-Morana. In the Catholic tradition Blaise is the patron of throat diseases, and on his feast day apples and candles are blessed to protect from these diseases; his feast day is 3 February. Pieces of apples sacrificed on the day of St. Blaise were once also given to cattle.

== Traditions ==
During the festival, prayers are offered to Veles for protection of the livestock and health by sacrificing milk. An important part of the festival is a feast held near the place of worship (e.g. a temple), during which it is strictly forbidden to eat veal. The main dish eaten during the Veles festival is groats richly seasoned with fat. The celebrations are often accompanied by the organization of ritual fights.

The holiday is celebrated around 11 February or 24.

Since 2017, the Palace of Culture Świt in Warsaw has hosted the National Veles Festival, organized by the Association of Pomeranian Rodnovers "Jantar" and the Drzewo Przodków in cooperation with the Wioska Żywej Archeologii (Village of Living Archaeology), whose regular elements include lectures and panel discussions.

== See also ==
- Festival of Perun

== Bibliography ==
- Gayvoronskaya, Anastasiya Viktorovna (2017). "Традиционные славянские праздники солярного цикла". Всероссийский фестиваль науки NAUKA 0+. XXI Международная конференция студентов, аспирантов и молодых ученых «Наука и образование» (PDF) (in Russian). Tomsk: ФГБОУ ВО «ТГПУ». pp. 159–163.
- Surovegina, Yekaterina Sergeyevna (2017). "«День Велеса» в праздничном цикле союза общин «Велесов Круг»". Религия и общество – 11: сборник научных статей (in Russian). Mogilev: ФГБОУ ВО «ТГПУ». pp. 228–230.
- Skonieczna-Gawlik, Dobrawa (2016). Tropem badaczy Zagłębia Dąbrowskiego (PDF) (in Polish). Regionalny Instytut Kultury w Katowicach.
- Kur'yanov, Sergey Olegovich; Baranov, Aleksandr Vasil'yevich (2020). "Пастух небесных стад и скотий бог: Велес в русской фольклорной картине мира". Вестник славянских культур (in Russian). 56.
- Matsʹkiv, Petro (2017). "Давні вірування українців: лінгвокультурологічний аспект". Рідне слово в етнокультурному вимірі (in Ukrainian). ISSN 2411-4758.
- Aitamurto, Kaarina (2016). Paganism, Traditionalism, Nationalism: Narratives of Russian Rodnoverie. London: Routledge. ISBN 978-1-317-08443-3.
- Pomorski, Wszemir (2020). "Duchowe Plony i Ogólnopolskie Święto Welesa". Gniazdo - rodzima wiara i kultura. 1 (20 ed.). Wydawnictwo As Pik: 14–16. ISSN 2081-9072.
