= Veles Bastion =

Location of Brabant Island in the Antarctic Peninsula region.

Veles Bastion (Bulgarian: рид Велес, romanized: rid Veles, IPA: [ˈrid ˈvɛlɛs]) is the ice-covered buttress of elevation 1223 m forming the southwest extremity of Stribog Mountains on Brabant Island in the Palmer Archipelago, Antarctica. It has steep and partly ice-free north, west and southwest slopes, and surmounts Zlatiya Glacier to the east and south.

The peak is named after the Slavic god of wisdom and knowledge Veles.

== Location ==
Veles Bastion is located at 64°20′05″S 62°31′30″W, which is 3.13 km east of Fleming Point, 10.15 km southwest of Mount Parry, 7 km west-northwest of Mount Imhotep and 2.77 km north of Mount Sarnegor. British mapping in 1980 and 2008.

== Maps ==
- Antarctic Digital Database (ADD). Scale 1:250000 topographic map of Antarctica. Scientific Committee on Antarctic Research (SCAR). Since 1993, regularly upgraded and updated.
- British Antarctic Territory. Scale 1:200000 topographic map. DOS 610 Series, Sheet W 64 62. Directorate of Overseas Surveys, Tolworth, UK, 1980.
- Brabant Island to Argentine Islands. Scale 1:250000 topographic map. British Antarctic Survey, 2008.
