= Mount Bulcke =

Mountain on Brabant Island, Antarctica

Mount Bulcke (64°29′S 62°37′W) is a bold summit, 1,030 metres (3,380 ft) high, at the end of an ice-covered spur which extends south from the Solvay Mountains, in the southern extremity of Brabant Island, in the Palmer Archipelago. It was discovered by the Belgian Antarctic Expedition under Gerlache, 1897–99, and named by him for a supporter of the expedition.

The Bulcke Finger projects from the western slopes of Mount Bulcke.

== Maps ==
- Antarctic Digital Database (ADD). Scale 1:250000 topographic map of Antarctica. Scientific Committee on Antarctic Research (SCAR). Since 1993, regularly upgraded and updated.
- British Antarctic Territory. Scale 1:200000 topographic map. DOS 610 Series, Sheet W 64 62. Directorate of Overseas Surveys, Tolworth, UK, 1980.
- Brabant Island to Argentine Islands. Scale 1:250000 topographic map. British Antarctic Survey, 2008.
