= Chiriguano Bay =

Bay in Antarctica

Chiriguano Bay (64°28′S 62°31′W) is a bay northeast of Strath Point, indenting the south end of Brabant Island in the Palmer Archipelago. The bay was surveyed and named "Bahia Chiriguano" by the Argentine Antarctic Expedition, 1948–49, after the Argentine tugboat Chiriguano which took part in the survey.

== Maps ==
- Antarctic Digital Database (ADD). Scale 1:250000 topographic map of Antarctica. Scientific Committee on Antarctic Research (SCAR). Since 1993, regularly upgraded and updated.
- British Antarctic Territory. Scale 1:200000 topographic map. DOS 610 Series, Sheet W 64 62. Directorate of Overseas Surveys, Tolworth, UK, 1980.
- Brabant Island to Argentine Islands. Scale 1:250000 topographic map. British Antarctic Survey, 2008.
