= Hulot Peninsula =

Peninsula in Antarctica

Hulot Peninsula (64°29′S 62°44′W) is a rugged peninsula forming the southwestern extremity of Brabant Island, in the Palmer Archipelago, Antarctica. It was first charted by the French Antarctic Expedition, 1903–05, and named by Jean-Baptiste Charcot for Baron Hulot.

Mount Beddie is located on the peninsula.

== Maps ==
- Antarctic Digital Database (ADD). Scale 1:250000 topographic map of Antarctica. Scientific Committee on Antarctic Research (SCAR). Since 1993, regularly upgraded and updated.
- British Antarctic Territory. Scale 1:200000 topographic map. DOS 610 Series, Sheet W 64 62. Directorate of Overseas Surveys, Tolworth, UK, 1980.
- Brabant Island to Argentine Islands. Scale 1:250000 topographic map. British Antarctic Survey, 2008.

== Features ==
- Lehaie Point, the southwestern point of Hulot Peninsula
