= Schollaert Channel =

Strait in Antarctica

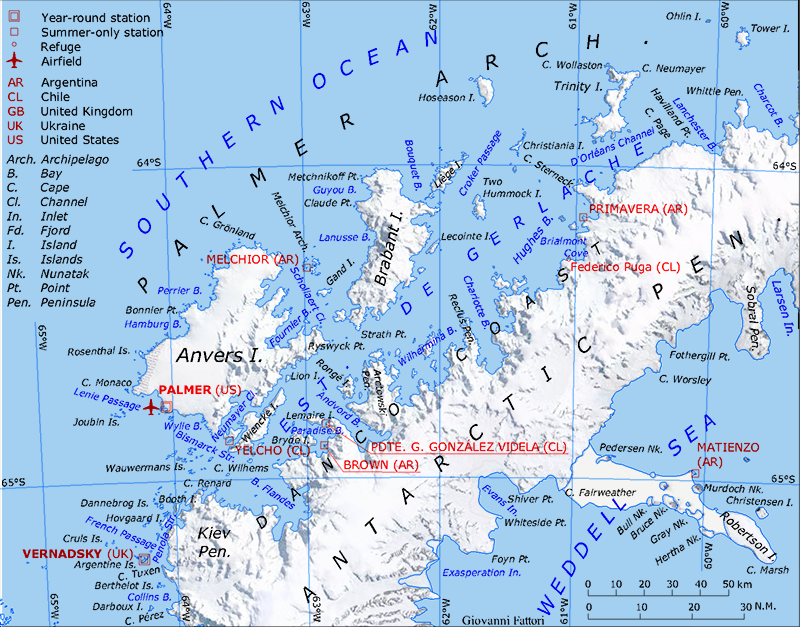
Schollaert Channel lies between Anvers Island and Brabant Island

Schollaert Channel (64°30′S 62°50′W) is a channel in the Antarctic between Anvers Island on the southwest and Brabant Island on the northeast, connecting Dallmann Bay and Gerlache Strait, in the Palmer Archipelago. It was discovered in 1898 by the Belgian Antarctic Expedition under Gerlache, who named it for the Belgian statesman Frans Schollaert. This channel is located within the coordinates of the Palmer Archipelago.

== See also ==
- Gerlache Strait Geology
