= Festival of Perun =

Slavic holiday

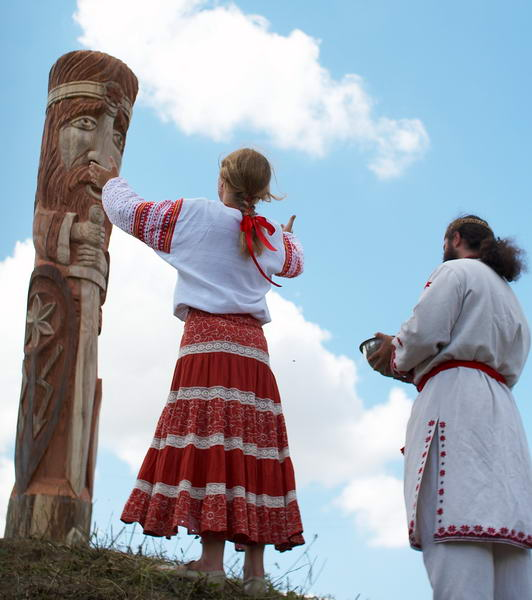
- Rite in honor of Perun in Ukraine
- Observed by: Slavic people
- Type: Ethnic
- Date: 20 July
- Related to: Perun

Festival of Perun, Perun's Day, Perunica is a Slavic festival in honor of the god Perun celebrated by modern Slavic neopagans (rodnovers); its existence in times before the Slavs began to be Christianized remains hypothetical.

== Origin of the holiday ==
The existence of the cult in pre-Christian times is a hypothesis put forward as part of Boris Rybakov's interpretation of the ornamentation of archaeological artefacts. The cult of Perun was probably replaced by the cult of the prophet Elijah among the Kyiv boyars in the process of Christianization of Rus. Elijah's Day, celebrated in Christian times on July 20, bore distinct features of ancient pagan cults, and it is presumed that it replaced the original festival in honor of the god of thunder Perun. In popular belief Elijah wields storm clouds to influence the fertility of the fields and uses lightning against demons and blasphemers.

== Traditions ==
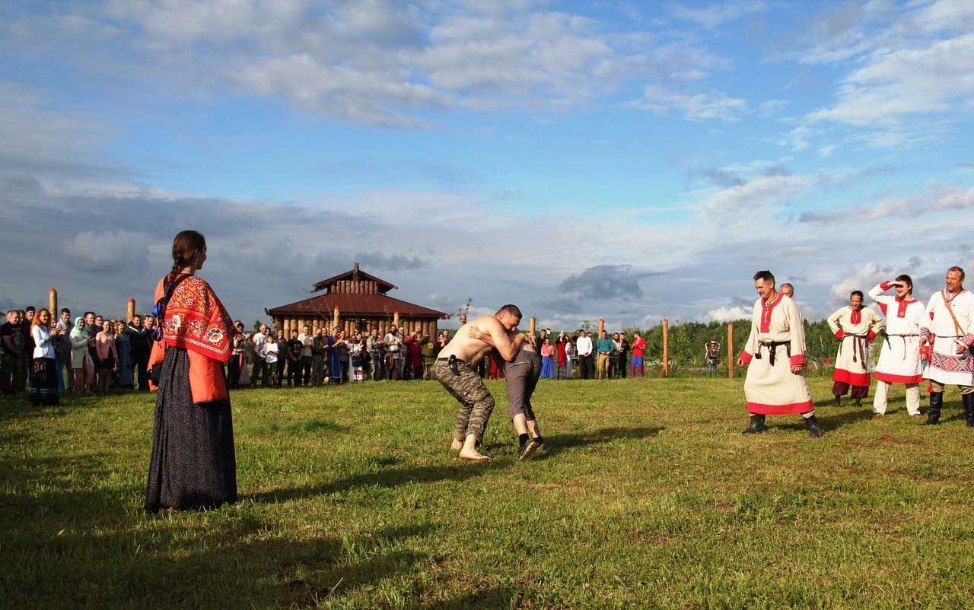
Ritual fights during festival celebrations in Russia

The festival is celebrated on July 20 or 21 by the neopagans in Poland within registered religious organizations, as well as informal communities, and also in other Slavic countries, including Ukraine, Slovakia, and Russia, where in some groups of rodnovers this holiday is regarded as the most important of the year. During the festival there are games (sports competitions) in honor of Perun, during which participants compete in such disciplines as combat sports and tug-of-war.

== See also ==
- Festival of Veles

== Bibliography ==
- Gajda, Agnieszka (2007). "Święta i obrzędy Rodzimej Wiary". Państwo i Społeczeństwo. 2.
- Gieysztor, Aleksander (2006). Mitologia Słowian (in Polish). Warsaw: Wydawnictwa Uniwersytetu Warszawskiego. ISBN 978-83-235-0234-0.
- Matsʹkiv, Petro (2017). "Давні вірування українців: лінгвокультурологічний аспект". Рідне слово в етнокультурному вимірі (in Ukrainian). ISSN 2411-4758.
- Korepanova, Victoria Olegovna (2017). "Пантеон восточных славян: от язычества к христианству". Вопросы истории, археологии, политических наук и регионоведения: сборник материалов XIII Всерос. науч. конф. студентов, магистрантов, аспирантов и мол. ученых (in Russian). Tomsk: Издательство Томского университета.
- Aitamurto, Kaarina (2016). Paganism, Traditionalism, Nationalism: Narratives of Russian Rodnoverie. London: Routledge. ISBN 978-1-317-08443-3.
