= Strath Point =

Headland of Brabant Island in the Palmer Archipelago

Strath Point (64°32′S 62°36′W) is a low ice-covered point forming the south end of Brabant Island, in the Palmer Archipelago. Roughly charted by the Belgian Antarctic Expedition under Gerlache, 1897–99. Photographed by Hunting Aerosurveys Ltd. in 1956–57, and mapped from these photos in 1959. The name is descriptive; "strath" means a stretch of flat land by the sea or a broad river valley.

== Maps ==
- Antarctic Digital Database (ADD). Scale 1:250000 topographic map of Antarctica. Scientific Committee on Antarctic Research (SCAR). Since 1993, regularly upgraded and updated.
- British Antarctic Territory. Scale 1:200000 topographic map. DOS 610 Series, Sheet W 64 62. Directorate of Overseas Surveys, Tolworth, UK, 1980.
- Brabant Island to Argentine Islands. Scale 1:250000 topographic map. British Antarctic Survey, 2008.
