= Mount Beddie =

Mountain in Antarctica

Mount Beddie (64°29′S 62°43′W) is a rounded, snow-covered mountain rising to 435 m on Hulot Peninsula in the southwest end of Brabant Island, Palmer Archipelago. The mountain was charted and named by the French Antarctic Expedition, 1903–05, led by Jean-Baptiste Charcot.
