= Duperré Bay =

Bay in Antarctica

Duperré Bay (64°27′S 62°41′W) is a bay 3 nautical miles (6 km) long, lying immediately northeast of Hulot Peninsula at the southwest extremity of Brabant Island, in the Palmer Archipelago. It was discovered by the French Antarctic Expedition, 1903–05, under Jean-Baptiste Charcot, who named it for Vice Admiral Charles Duperré of the French Navy.

== Maps ==
- Antarctic Digital Database (ADD). Scale 1:250000 topographic map of Antarctica. Scientific Committee on Antarctic Research (SCAR). Since 1993, regularly upgraded and updated.
- British Antarctic Territory. Scale 1:200000 topographic map. DOS 610 Series, Sheet W 64 62. Directorate of Overseas Surveys, Tolworth, UK, 1980.
- Brabant Island to Argentine Islands. Scale 1:250000 topographic map. British Antarctic Survey, 2008.
