= Humann Point =

Headland in Antarctica

Humann Point (64°24′S 62°41′W) is a point forming the north side of the entrance to Duperré Bay on the west side of Brabant Island, in the Palmer Archipelago, Antarctica. It was first charted by the French Antarctic Expedition, 1903–05, and named by Jean-Baptiste Charcot for Vice-Admiral Humann of the French Navy.
