= Dallmann Bay =

Coordinates: 64°20′S 62°55′W

Dallmann Bay is a bay lying between Brabant Island and Anvers Island, connected to Gerlache Strait by the Schollaert Channel, in the Palmer Archipelago. It was discovered and first roughly charted in 1874 by the German whaler Captain Eduard Dallmann, and was named for Dallmann by the Society for Polar Navigation, Hamburg, which sponsored Dallmann's Antarctic exploration. It was later charted by the French Antarctic Expedition, 1903–05, under Jean-Baptiste Charcot.

== See also ==
- Gerlache Strait Geology
- Anvers Island Geology
