= Rush Glacier =

Glacier in Antarctica

- Location of Brabant Island in the Antarctic Peninsula region

- Location within Antarctica
- Location: Palmer Archipelago
- Coordinates: 64°23′S 62°37′W
- Length: 4 nmi (7 km; 5 mi)
- Thickness: unknown
- Terminus: Buragara Cove
- Status: unknown

Rush Glacier (64°23′S 62°37′W) is a glacier in Antarctica. Situated in southern Brabant Island, it is 4 nautical miles (7 km) long, draining the northwest slopes of Solvay Mountains and flowing west between Mount Aciar and Mount Sarnegor into the Buragara Cove of Dallmann Bay in the Palmer Archipelago. It was shown on an Argentine government chart in 1953, but not named. It was photographed by Hunting Aerosurveys Ltd in 1956–57, and mapped from these photos in 1959. The glacier was named by the United Kingdom Antarctic Place-Names Committee (UK-APC) for Benjamin Rush (1745–1813), a noted American physician and philanthropist, and a signatory of the Declaration of Independence.

== See also ==
- List of glaciers in the Antarctic
- Glaciology

== Maps ==
- Antarctic Digital Database (ADD). Scale 1:250000 topographic map of Antarctica. Scientific Committee on Antarctic Research (SCAR). Since 1993, regularly upgraded and updated.
- British Antarctic Territory. Scale 1:200000 topographic map. DOS 610 Series, Sheet W 64 62. Directorate of Overseas Surveys, Tolworth, UK, 1980.
- Brabant Island to Argentine Islands. Scale 1:250000 topographic map. British Antarctic Survey, 2008.
