= Solvay Mountains =

Mountain range on Brabant Island, Antarctica

Location of Brabant Island in the Antarctic Peninsula region.

The Solvay Mountains are a mountain range that rises to 1590 m (Cook Summit) and extends in an ENE–WSW direction in the south part of Brabant Island, in the Palmer Archipelago of Antarctica. They were discovered by the Belgian Antarctic Expedition of 1897–99, under Adrien de Gerlache, and named by him for Ernest-John Solvay (1895-1972), the recently born grandson of Ernest Solvay, who sponsored the expedition. The name originally extended along the entire east coast of the island but has been limited to the prominent mountains in the south, while the principal group of mountains farther north was subsequently named Stribog Mountains, separated from Solvay Mountains by Aluzore Gap.

== Mountains ==
Mount Aciar (64°24′S 62°33′W), variously known also as Monte Ferrer, Mount Ehrlich, Monte E, and Monte Primer Teniente Aciar, rises to 1,300 metres (4,265 ft) between the heads of Rush Glacier and Jenner Glacier in the Solvay Mountains.

== Maps ==
- Antarctic Digital Database (ADD). Scale 1:250000 topographic map of Antarctica. Scientific Committee on Antarctic Research (SCAR). Since 1993, regularly upgraded and updated.
- British Antarctic Territory. Scale 1:200000 topographic map. DOS 610 Series, Sheet W 64 62. Directorate of Overseas Surveys, Tolworth, UK, 1980.
- Brabant Island to Argentine Islands. Scale 1:250000 topographic map. British Antarctic Survey, 2008.
