= Bulawayo Central =

- National Assembly constituency for the Parliament of Zimbabwe
- District: Bulawayo
- Province: Bulawayo
- Electorate: 25,804 (2023)

Current constituency
- Created: 1924–1987; recreated 2008
- Number of members: 1
- Party: Citizens Coalition for Change
- Member: Surrender Kapoikilu
- Created from: Bulawayo East

Bulawayo Central is a constituency represented in the National Assembly of the Parliament of Zimbabwe, located in Bulawayo. It is currently represented since the 2023 election by Surrender Kapoikilu of the Citizens Coalition for Change. Notable former MPs for the constituency include former Rhodesian Prime Minister Ian Smith.

== Members ==
| Election | Name | Party |
|---|---|---|
| 1924 | James Cowden | RP |
| 1924 | Francis Hadfield | RP |
| 1928 | James Cowden | RP |
| 1928 | Donald MacGillivray | RP |
| 1933 | James Cowden | RP |
| 1933 | Donald MacIntyre | Labour |
| 1934 | James Cowden | UP |
| 1934 | Donald MacIntyre | Labour |
| 1939 | William Eastwood | UP |
| 1946 | Donald MacIntyre | SR Labour |
| 1948 | Donald MacIntyre | UP |
| 1954 | Cyril Hatty | UP |
| 1958 | Cyril Hatty | UFP |
| 1962 | Benny Goldstein | UFP |
| 1965 | missing | |
| 1970 | Sydney Millar | RF |
| 1974 | Edward Stanley White | RF |
| 1977 | Denys Parkin | RF |
| 1979 | Paddy Shields | RF |
| 1980 | Paddy Shields | RF |
| 1985 | Ian Smith | CAZ |
Constituency abolished 1987–2008
| 2008 | Dorcas Sibanda | MDC–T |
| 2013 | Dorcas Sibanda | MDC–T |
| 2018 | Nicola Watson | MDC Alliance |
| 2023 | Surrender Kapoikilu | CCC |

== Election results ==
2008 general election: Bulawayo Central
| Party | Candidate | Votes | % |
|---|---|---|---|
| MDC–T | Dorcas Sibanda | 3,786 | 43.33 |
| MDC-M | Japhet Ncube | 3,553 | 40.67 |
| ZANU–PF | Clement Ncube | 908 | 10.39 |
| Independent | Frank Dzukuso | 191 | 2.19 |
| PUMA | Arnold Payne | 162 | 1.85 |
| Independent | Frank Dzukuso | 191 | 2.19 |
| Federal Democratic Union | Gifton Dumani | 74 | 0.85 |
| Independent | Selwin Kwembeya | 63 | 0.72 |
| Majority | | 233 | 2.66% |
| MDC–T win (new seat) | | | |

2013 Zimbabwean general election: Bulawayo Central
| Candidate | Party | Votes | % |
|---|---|---|---|
| Dorcas Staff Sibanda | MDC-T | 6,365 | 56.33 |
| Mlungisi Moyo | ZANU-PF | 2,827 | 25.02 |
| Sibongile Maphosa | MDC | 1,572 | 13.91 |
| Clemence Sibanda | ZAPU | 259 | 2.29 |
| Maidza Chapwanya | MKD | 126 | 1.12 |
| Selwin Angirayi Kwembeya | UMD | 126 | 1.12 |
| Linda Dube | AKE | 24 | 0.21 |
| Total | | 11,299 | 100.00 |
| Valid votes | | 11,299 | 98.72 |
| Invalid/blank votes | | 146 | 1.28 |
| Total votes | | 11,445 | 100.00 |
| Majority | | 3,538 | 31.3 |
| MDC-T hold | | | |
Source: ZEC

== See also ==
- List of Zimbabwean parliamentary constituencies
