= Leader of the Opposition (Rhodesia) =

Politician who led the official opposition in Rhodesia

The leader of the opposition in Southern Rhodesia and Rhodesia was a title held by the leader of the largest political party in the most important house of the legislature that was not in government.

This was the unicameral Legislative Assembly from 1924 to 1970 and the House of Assembly of the bicameral Parliament from 1970 to 1979. They acted as the public face of the opposition, leading the Shadow Cabinet and the challenge to the government on the floor of the legislature. They thus acted as a chief critic of the government and ultimately attempt to portray the opposition as a feasible alternate government.

== List of leaders of the opposition in Rhodesia (1924–1979) ==
No.	Portrait	Leader (Birth–Death)	Political party	Term of office
vacant (Note: At the 1924 election, the only opposition MPs elected were independents. No leader of the opposition was recognised.)				1924–1928
1		Robert Gilchrist	Progressive Party / Reform Party	1928–1933
2		Percy Finn	Rhodesia Party	1933–1934
3		Harry Davies (1878–1957)	Labour Party	1934–1940
4		Donald MacIntyre (1891–1978)	Labour Party	1940–1946
5		Jacob Smit (1881–1959)	Liberal Party	1946–1948
6		Raymond Stockil	Liberal Party	1948–1954
vacant (Note: At the 1954 election, the only opposition MPs elected were independents. No leader of the opposition was recognised, although Raymond Stockil and Stewart Aitken-Cade seemed to be recognised as having a leadership role.)				1954–1958
(6)		Raymond Stockil	Dominion Party	1958–1959
7		Stewart Aitken-Cade	Dominion Party	1959–1960
8		William Harper (1916–2006)	Dominion Party	1960–1962
9		William Cary	Dominion Party	1962 – 14 December 1962
10		Edgar Whitehead (1905–1971)	United Federal Party	17 December 1962 – 12 February 1965
11		Alan David Butler (1927–1972)	Rhodesia Party (Note: This Rhodesia Party was established in August 1964 by former federal prime minister Roy Welensky, bringing together most members of the Rhodesia National Party, led by Edgar Whitehead, and other opponents of the Rhodesian Front. It was distinct from the original Rhodesia Party (1923–1934), the party associated with Raymond Stockil in the early 1950s, and the Rhodesia Party founded by Allan Savory in 1972. Butler succeeded Welensky as party leader in February 1965.)	12 February 1965 – 7 May 1965
12		Josiah Gondo (died 1972)	United People's Party (Note: In the 1965 Rhodesian general election, the Rhodesian Front won all 50 constituency seats, elected primarily by the predominantly white A-roll electorate. The predominantly black African United People's Party, led by Gondo, won 10 of the 15 district seats, elected primarily by B-roll voters. The United People's Party was distinct from the predominantly white Rhodesia Party, which also opposed the Rhodesian Front.)	7 May 1965 – 25 March 1966
13		Chad Chipunza	United People's Party	25 March 1966 – 1966
(12)		Josiah Gondo (died 1972)	United People's Party	1966 – 21 January 1967
14		Percy Mkudu	United People's Party	21 January 1967 – 1969
(13)		Chad Chipunza	United People's Party	1969–1970
vacant (Note: At the 1970 election, the electoral system changed. Although the African MPs formed themselves into parties, the Rhodesian Front government declined to recognise any of them as the formal Opposition and therefore did not have a leader of the opposition. There was a white opposition party, the Rhodesia Party formed by Rhodesian Front defector Allan Savory MP in 1972, but he was not recognised as leader of the opposition either. Neither was the Rhodesian Action Party recognised as the lead opposition party when formed in 1977 — instead the Rhodesian Front government dissolved Parliament and called an early election.)				1970–1979
