= Kadoma Central =

Constituency of the Parliament of Zimbabwe

- Constituency for the National Assembly of Zimbabwe
- Province: Mashonaland West
- Region: Kadoma District
- Major settlements: Kadoma

Current constituency
- Created: 1928
- Number of members: 1
- Party: Citizens Coalition for Change
- Member(s): Gift Mambiripiri

Kadoma Central is a constituency represented in the National Assembly of the Parliament of Zimbabwe. Located in the town of Kadoma, Mashonaland West Province, it is currently represented by Gift Mambiripiri of the Citizens Coalition for Change since the 2023 election. An older constituency, Gatooma (the town's colonial name), was represented in the Parliament of Rhodesia between 1928 and 1979.

== Members ==
Note: In the 1985 and 2005 elections, the constituency was known simply as Kadoma.

Election	Name	Party
Gatooma
1928	George Munro	Rhodesia Party
1933	William Sydney Senior	Reform
1934	William Sydney Senior	United
1939	Thomas Alfred Kimble	Labour
1946	George Munro	Liberal
1948	George Munro	Liberal
1954	Max Buchan	United
1958	William Harper	Dominion
1962	William Harper	Rhodesian Front
1965	William Harper	Rhodesian Front
1968 by-election	Albert Mells	Rhodesian Front
1970	Albert Mells	Rhodesian Front
1974	Albert Mells	Rhodesian Front
1977	Albert Mells	Rhodesian Front
Constituency abolished 1979–1985
Kadoma Central
1985	Charles Ndhlovu	ZANU–PF
Constituency abolished 1990–2000
2000	Austin Mupandawana	MDC
2003 by-election	Tichafa Mutema	ZANU–PF
2005	Editor Matamisa	MDC
2008	Editor Matamisa	MDC–T
2013	Fani Phanuel Phiri	ZANU–PF
2018	Muchineripi Chinyanganya	MDC Alliance
2023	Gift Mambiripiri	CCC

== See also ==
- List of Zimbabwean parliamentary constituencies
