= Responsible Government Association =

Political party in Southern Rhodesia

Rhodesia Party
- Abbreviation: RGA
- First Leader: Charles Coghlan
- Founded: 1917; 1962
- Dissolved: 1934; 1968
- Merged into: United Party (1934); Centre Party
- Headquarters: Salisbury, Southern Rhodesia
- Ideology: Liberalism; Anti-Unionism
- Political position: Centre
- International affiliation: None

The Responsible Government Association (RGA), called the Rhodesia Party from 1923, was a political party in Southern Rhodesia. (Note: Renamed Zimbabwe in 1980) Founded in 1917, it initially advocated responsible government for Southern Rhodesia within the British Empire, as opposed to incorporation into the Union of South Africa. When responsible government was achieved in 1923, the party became the governing Rhodesia Party. It endured until 1934, when it merged with the right wing of the Reform Party to create the United Party, which remained in power for 28 years afterwards, and was itself defunct by 1965.

== History ==
=== Responsible Government Association (1917–23) ===
Led by Sir Charles Coghlan, a Bulawayo lawyer originally from South Africa, the RGA was formed in 1917, and fought the 1920 election to the colony's Legislative Council. The party's main platform was one in favour of responsible government for Southern Rhodesia within the British Empire, and against incorporation into the Union of South Africa, which had been formed in 1910 by the British South Africa Act, 1909. In this campaign the RGA was allied to the Labour Party, whilst its main opponents were the Unionists, who advocated integration into South Africa. A government referendum was organised in 1922, and responsible government won the day. Southern Rhodesia was duly made self-governing and semi-independent within the Empire in October 1923.

=== Rhodesia Party (1923–34) ===
Coghlan became the first Premier of Southern Rhodesia, and the party continued as the Rhodesia Party, which had a broader base of support, including a number of former unionists in its cabinet. It remained in power until September 1933, when the party narrowly topped the popular vote, but lost the election, winning only nine of the 30 seats compared to the Reform Party's 16. Although the Reform Party was left-wing in name, many of its leading members, including the new prime minister Dr Godfrey Huggins, were politically conservative; the Rhodesia Party merged with the Reform Party's more rightist members in 1934 to form the United Party.

=== Legacy ===
With Huggins at the helm, the United Party roundly defeated the rump left wing of the Reform Party in an election held the same year. The United Party thereafter remained in government for nearly three decades, with Huggins leading it until his retirement in 1956. The party renamed itself the United Rhodesia Party in 1953, soon after Southern Rhodesia was federated with Northern Rhodesia and Nyasaland, and merged with the Federal Party in 1958 to become the United Federal Party. Its leaders included Garfield Todd and Edgar Whitehead, both of whom pursued mildly reformist policies which led to expanded political participation by black Africans. It was removed from power by the Rhodesian Front's 1962 electoral victory, and was inactive by 1965.

== Later parties using the name ==
The Rhodesia Party name was subsequently used by three other political organisations, none of which was a continuation of the party dissolved in 1934.

Following the 1948 Southern Rhodesian general election, a breakaway group from the Liberal Party adopted the Rhodesia Party name under Raymond Stockil. The party advocated greater autonomy for Southern Rhodesia and questioned the proposed Federation of Rhodesia and Nyasaland. In September 1953, its members, including Ian Smith, agreed to join the governing party in forming the United Rhodesia Party. Stockil subsequently left the new organisation.

On 12 August 1964, former federal prime minister Roy Welensky announced the formation of a new Rhodesia Party, intended to bring together most members of the Rhodesia National Party (RNP), led by Edgar Whitehead, and other opponents of the governing Rhodesian Front. The RNP had emerged from the reorganisation of the United Federal Party in 1963. The new Rhodesia Party supported negotiated independence from Britain, continued Commonwealth membership and retention of the existing constitution pending an agreement. Welensky resigned as leader in December 1964 and was succeeded on 11 February 1965 by Alan David Butler, who defeated Whitehead in a leadership election. The party lost its parliamentary representation in the 1965 Rhodesian general election.

A further Rhodesia Party was founded on 31 October 1972 by Allan Savory, Roy Ashburner and Morris Hirsch. It opposed the Rhodesian Front and advocated political reforms, but failed to win any seats in the 1974 Rhodesian general election. Savory was replaced as leader by Tim Gibbs in 1974. In 1977, the party joined the Centre Party in forming the National Unifying Force.

== Notes and references ==
Notes

Bibliography

- Blake, Robert (1977). A History of Rhodesia. New York: Alfred A. Knopf. ISBN 0-394-48068-6.
- Gale, William Daniel (1973). The years between 1923–1973: half a century of responsible government in Rhodesia. Salisbury: H. C. P. Andersen.
- Lord Saint Brides (April 1980). "The Lessons of Zimbabwe-Rhodesia". International Security. 4 (4). Cambridge, Massachusetts: The MIT Press: 177–184. doi:10.2307/2626673. JSTOR 2626673.
- Willson, F. M. G., ed. (1963). Source Book of Parliamentary Elections and Referenda in Southern Rhodesia, 1898–1962. Salisbury: Department of Government, University College of Rhodesia and Nyasaland.
