= 1946 Southern Rhodesian general election =

- April 25, 1946
- All 30 seats in the Southern Rhodesian Legislative Assembly; 16 seats needed for a majority
- Turnout: 67.51%
Party	Leader	Vote %	Seats	+/–
United	Godfrey Huggins	43.22	13	−10
Liberal	Jacob Smit	32.93	12	New
Labour		16.69	3	−4
SRLP		5.61	2	New
This lists parties that won seats. See the complete results below.
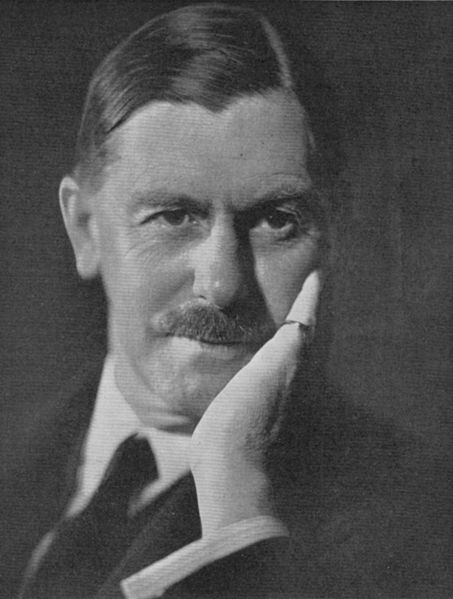

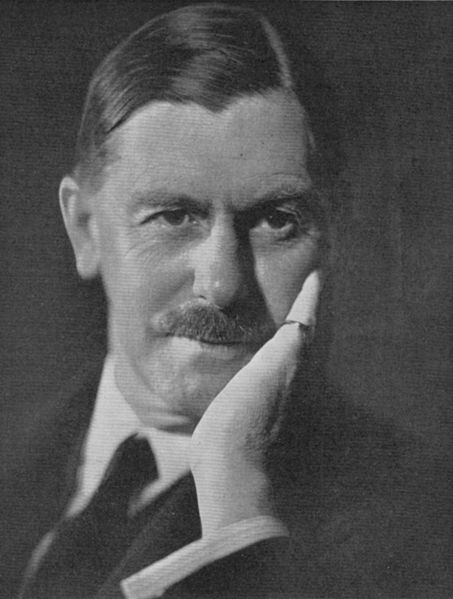
Prime Minister before	Prime Minister after election
Godfrey Huggins; United Party	Godfrey Huggins; United Party

General elections were held in Southern Rhodesia on 25 April 1946, seven years after the previous elections in 1939, the term of the Southern Rhodesian Legislative Assembly having been extended so that there would be no general elections during World War II. The elections showed a strong shift to the right, as the United Party government led by Prime Minister Godfrey Huggins lost its overall majority; however, Huggins could count on the support of one of the factions of the Rhodesia Labour Party in any vote of confidence and therefore remained in office.

== Electoral system ==
During the war a number of changes to the franchise had been made. The arrival of large numbers of British subjects to train as pilots for the Royal Air Force from 1940 led to a sudden increase in the electorate. Many Rhodesians felt that the forces personnel ought not to have the vote, given that their presence in Rhodesia was transitory and they had no long-term commitment. Therefore, the Assembly passed the Electoral Amendment Act 1941 which disfranchised them. The Act also disfranchised British subjects from other dominions who were not prepared to make a declaration of willingness to serve in Southern Rhodesia's defence forces. A third provision of the Act was to extend a previous lifetime disqualification of those sentenced to imprisonment to those given suspended prison sentences.

In the Civil Disabilities Act 1942, anyone convicted of treasonable or seditious practices, those who had deserted from or evaded service in the Army, or who were cashiered or dishonourably discharged, was disqualified from registration as a voter. To cope with the large number of Rhodesians serving away from the colony in the armed forces, the Active Service Voters Act 1943 permitted them to record their votes in a general election. They were permitted to vote for a political party rather than an individual candidate.

There were no alterations to the boundaries of the electoral districts.

== Political parties ==
Jacob Smit, who had been an ally of Huggins in Reform Party days and previously served at the Ministry of Finance, went into opposition early in 1944. He joined a group of conservatives who were developing a new political party on the principles of economy in public spending, free enterprise, and seeking dominion status within the British Empire. Smit was soon appointed the Leader of this group, which named itself the Southern Rhodesia Liberal Party.

== Results ==
Party	Votes	%	Seats	+/–
United Party	11,865	43.22	13	–10
Southern Rhodesia Liberal Party	9,041	32.93	12	New
Rhodesia Labour Party	4,583	16.69	3	–4
Southern Rhodesia Labour Party	1,540	5.61	2	New
Independents	424	1.54	0	0
Total	27,453	100.00	30	0
Valid votes	27,453	99.32		
Invalid/blank votes	188	0.68		
Total votes	27,641	100.00		
Registered voters/turnout	40,943	67.51		
Source: Willson

=== By constituency ===
- Ind – Independent
- Lab – Rhodesia Labour Party
- L – Liberal Party
- SR Lab – Southern Rhodesia Labour Party
- UP – United Party

Constituency Electorate and turnout	Candidate	Party	Votes
AVONDALE; 1,632 (75.4%)	Albert Rubidge Washington Stumbles	L	567
AVONDALE; 1,632 (75.4%)	Cecil Douglas Dryden	UP	488
AVONDALE; 1,632 (75.4%)	Neil Housman Wilson	Ind	77
AVONDALE; 1,632 (75.4%)	Alexander Aitken Draper	SR Lab	57
AVONDALE; 1,632 (75.4%)	George Arthur Henry Radford	Lab	41
BULAWAYO CENTRAL; 1,644 (63.8%)	†Donald MacIntyre	SR Lab	353
BULAWAYO CENTRAL; 1,644 (63.8%)	Henry Alfred Holmes	UP	327
BULAWAYO CENTRAL; 1,644 (63.8%)	Mathew Henry Gibson	Lab	242
BULAWAYO CENTRAL; 1,644 (63.8%)	Olive Hope Robertson	L	127
BULAWAYO EAST; 1,231 (70.8%)	David Wood Young	UP	632
BULAWAYO EAST; 1,231 (70.8%)	Llewellyn Davies	L	239
BULAWAYO NORTH; 1,407 (61.3%)	†Thomas Hugh William Beadle	UP	666
BULAWAYO NORTH; 1,407 (61.3%)	Cecil Maurice Baker	Lab	196
BULAWAYO SOUTH; 1,949 (61.5%)	James Stuart McNeillie	Lab	518
BULAWAYO SOUTH; 1,949 (61.5%)	Malcolm Granger Fleming	UP	425
BULAWAYO SOUTH; 1,949 (61.5%)	Theodore Albert Edward Holdengarde	L	185
BULAWAYO SOUTH; 1,949 (61.5%)	Arthur Harold Bean	SR Lab	71
CHARTER; 1,051 (74.8%)	Jacob Letterstedt Smit	L	360
CHARTER; 1,051 (74.8%)	Herbert Jordan Posselt	UP	304
CHARTER; 1,051 (74.8%)	Mrs. Louise Hosea Fourie	Lab	122
EASTERN; 1,247 (71.2%)	Aubrey William Dunn	L	490
EASTERN; 1,247 (71.2%)	†Jacobus Petrus De Kock	UP	398
GATOOMA; 1,175 (62.0%)	George Munro	L	287
GATOOMA; 1,175 (62.0%)	William George Vowles	UP	243
GATOOMA; 1,175 (62.0%)	Arthur Henry Edwin Haycock	Lab	198
GWANDA; 1,113 (67.3%)	William Henry Elliott	UP	292
GWANDA; 1,113 (67.3%)	George Wilburn Rudland	L	287
GWANDA; 1,113 (67.3%)	Edwin Harley	Lab	170
GWELO; 1,405 (70.6%)	Robert Williamson	L	441
GWELO; 1,405 (70.6%)	†Max Danziger	UP	385
GWELO; 1,405 (70.6%)	Harry Joseph Filmer	Lab	166
HARTLEY; 1,360 (68.6%)	Thomas James Golding	L	487
HARTLEY; 1,360 (68.6%)	†Hugh Volant Wheeler	UP	446
HIGHLANDS; 1,951 (75.7%)	Charles Arden Bott	L	757
HIGHLANDS; 1,951 (75.7%)	†Leslie Benjamin Fereday	UP	595
HIGHLANDS; 1,951 (75.7%)	Charles Findlay	Lab	124
HILLSIDE; 1,690 (71.0%)	†Harry Herbert Davies	Lab	673
HILLSIDE; 1,690 (71.0%)	Eric Tom Hepburn	UP	438
HILLSIDE; 1,690 (71.0%)	John Wilfred Bush	L	88
INSIZA; 1,165 (61.4%)	Reginald Stephen Garfield Todd	UP	330
INSIZA; 1,165 (61.4%)	Victor Henry van Breda	Lab	195
INSIZA; 1,165 (61.4%)	Guy Maxwell Foy Southey	L	190
LOMAGUNDI; 1,128 (66.1%)	Patrick Archibald Wise	L	374
LOMAGUNDI; 1,128 (66.1%)	† George Henry Hackwill	UP	372
MARANDELLAS; 1,292 (74.0%)	Leslie Major Cullinan	UP	476
MARANDELLAS; 1,292 (74.0%)	William Thomas Edward Fitzsimons	L	340
MARANDELLAS; 1,292 (74.0%)	Edward Bostock Harben	SR Lab	140
MAZOE; 918 (64.4%)	†Edward Walter Lionel Noaks	UP	360
MAZOE; 918 (64.4%)	Jack Herbert Keightley	L	213
MAZOE; 918 (64.4%)	William Ramsay Ramsay	SR Lab	18
QUE QUE; 1,361 (79.9%)	George Arthur Davenport	UP	377
QUE QUE; 1,361 (79.9%)	John Henry Cremer	L	257
QUE QUE; 1,361 (79.9%)	Thomas Nangle	Lab	246
RAYLTON; 1,613 (67.2%)	†Lawrence John Walter Keller	Lab	470
RAYLTON; 1,613 (67.2%)	Kenneth Mackenzie Goodenough	UP	360
RAYLTON; 1,613 (67.2%)	Barend Gerhardus Retief	SR Lab	183
RAYLTON; 1,613 (67.2%)	David Graham Johnstone	L	71
SALISBURY CENTRAL; 1,470 (63.5%)	Leslie Manfred Noel Hodson	UP	438
SALISBURY CENTRAL; 1,470 (63.5%)	Ronald Leo Thomas	L	224
SALISBURY CENTRAL; 1,470 (63.5%)	Charles Olley	Ind	191
SALISBURY CENTRAL; 1,470 (63.5%)	†Edgar Pope Vernall	Lab	73
SALISBURY CENTRAL; 1,470 (63.5%)	Mrs. Agnes Tait Wilson	Ind	7
SALISBURY CITY; 1,683 (66.7%)	†Jacob Hendrik Smit	L	565
SALISBURY CITY; 1,683 (66.7%)	Robert Wynne Truscott	UP	352
SALISBURY CITY; 1,683 (66.7%)	Arthur Tom North	Lab	115
SALISBURY CITY; 1,683 (66.7%)	Mrs. Gladys Maasdorp	SR Lab	91
SALISBURY GARDENS; 1,408 (66.4%)	Sir Ernest Lucas Guest	UP	472
SALISBURY GARDENS; 1,408 (66.4%)	David Keith Watt	L	390
SALISBURY GARDENS; 1,408 (66.4%)	Ernest Roy Wright	SR Lab	39
SALISBURY GARDENS; 1,408 (66.4%)	Edwin Robert Wilson Major	Lab	34
SALISBURY NORTH; 1,199 (67.8%)	†Godfrey Martin Huggins	UP	525
SALISBURY NORTH; 1,199 (67.8%)	Eric Kenneth Hockey	L	265
SALISBURY NORTH; 1,199 (67.8%)	David Heurtley Linton	Ind	23
SALISBURY SOUTH; 1,741 (65.4%)	Denzil Crichton Paul	L	453
SALISBURY SOUTH; 1,741 (65.4%)	†George Henry Walker	Lab	338
SALISBURY SOUTH; 1,741 (65.4%)	Mrs. Muriel Ena Rosin	UP	295
SALISBURY SOUTH; 1,741 (65.4%)	Mrs. Otilia Liebermann	Ind	52
SELUKWE; 1,237 (68.0%)	George Baden-Powell Tunmer	L	421
SELUKWE; 1,237 (68.0%)	Egon Aage Klifborg	Lab	232
SELUKWE; 1,237 (68.0%)	Charles William Fenton Wells	UP	188
UMTALI NORTH; 1,036 (65.9%)	†Tom Ian Findlay Wilson	UP	413
UMTALI NORTH; 1,036 (65.9%)	Harry Thomas Fairbridge Went	SR Lab	129
UMTALI NORTH; 1,036 (65.9%)	Christopher Henry Perrem	L	96
UMTALI NORTH; 1,036 (65.9%)	Roelof Hendrik Venter	Lab	45
UMTALI SOUTH; 1,181 (70.9%)	†James Brown Lister	SR Lab	421
UMTALI SOUTH; 1,181 (70.9%)	Edgar Cuthbert Fremantle Whitehead	UP	331
UMTALI SOUTH; 1,181 (70.9%)	George Cyril Hamilton-Browne	L	68
UMTALI SOUTH; 1,181 (70.9%)	Hajo Spandow	Lab	17
VICTORIA; 1,333 (67.8%)	Raymond Osborne Stockil	L	522
VICTORIA; 1,333 (67.8%)	†William Alexander Eustace Winterton	UP	342
VICTORIA; 1,333 (67.8%)	John Theodore Appel	Lab	40
WANKIE; 1,125 (46.2%)	John Alexander Ewing	UP	200
WANKIE; 1,125 (46.2%)	†Allan Watson Whittington	Lab	197
WANKIE; 1,125 (46.2%)	Benjamin Austen Williams	L	123
WESTERN; 1,198 (66.1%)	†Patrick Bissett Fletcher	UP	395
WESTERN; 1,198 (66.1%)	Frederick William Sauerman	L	154
WESTERN; 1,198 (66.1%)	Francis Edward John Patrick Murray	Lab	131
WESTERN; 1,198 (66.1%)	Frank Richard Peach	Ind	74
WESTERN; 1,198 (66.1%)	Martin Olds	SR Lab	38

== Changes during the Assembly ==
=== Lomagundi ===
On 15 July 1946 an election petition from George Henry Hackwill in relation to the Lomagundi district was allowed. As a result, Patrick Archibald Wise was unseated, and Hackwill was declared elected.

=== Umtali North ===
Tom Ian Findlay Wilson resigned from the Assembly in September 1946. A byelection was held to replace him on 8 November 1946.

Constituency Electorate and turnout	Candidate	Party	Votes
UMTALI NORTH; 800 (79.3%)	Edgar Cuthbert Fremantle Whitehead	UP	427
UMTALI NORTH; 800 (79.3%)	Christopher Henry Perrem	L	207

=== Hartley ===
Thomas James Golding died on 2 August 1947. A byelection was held in his constituency on 26 September 1947.

Constituency Electorate and turnout	Candidate	Party	Votes
HARTLEY; 943 (49.9%)	Patrick Archibald Wise	L	543
HARTLEY; 943 (49.9%)	Ralph Drew Palmer	UP	294
