= 1948 Southern Rhodesian general election =

- September 15, 1948
- All 30 seats in the Southern Rhodesian Legislative Assembly; 16 seats needed for a majority
- Turnout: 73.51% (▲6.0 pp)
| Party | Vote % | Seats | +/– |
|---|---|---|---|
| United | 56.33 | 24 | +11 |
| Liberal | 30.48 | 5 | −7 |
| Labour | 13.01 | 1 | −2 |
This lists parties that won seats. See the complete results below.
Composition of the Legislative Assembly after the election
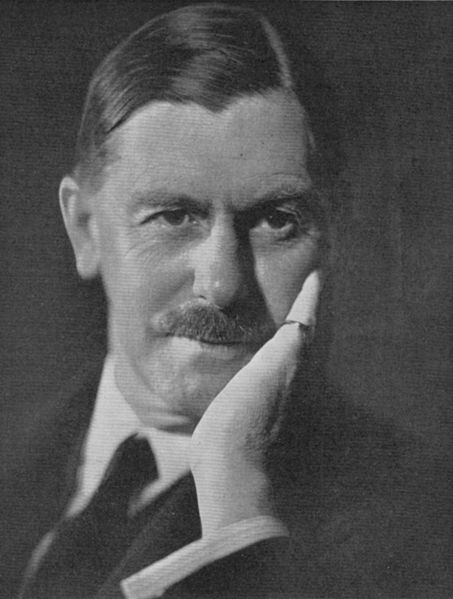

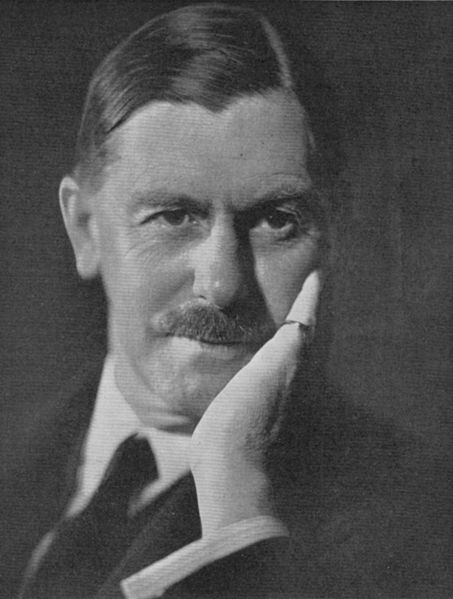
| Prime Minister before | Prime Minister after election |
|---|---|
| Godfrey Huggins; United Party | Godfrey Huggins; United Party |

General elections were held in Southern Rhodesia on 15 September 1948. They saw Prime Minister Godfrey Huggins regain the overall majority he had lost in the previous elections in 1946. Huggins' United Party won a landslide, reducing the opposition Liberal Party to a small minority.

== Background ==
The 1946 election had left the United Party in a precarious position in an overall minority in the Southern Rhodesian Legislative Assembly, and reliant on the support of the Rhodesia Labour Party. Huggins was therefore seeking an opportunity to re-establish an overall majority. However, Huggins knew from his experience in 1934 that he needed to justify asking for a dissolution of the Assembly and a general election, as the Governor was not necessarily willing to grant one merely because it had been asked for.

Early in 1948, Huggins made his move by proposing that his own United Party merge with the opposition Liberal Party (which was a right-wing organisation). He then went to the Legislative Assembly and put down a motion of confidence in his government which endorsed all its policies for the full term of the Assembly. The Liberal Party, sensing a trap, agreed to the principle of fusion of the two parties but insisted that it be on the basis of Liberal Party policy. When the vote of confidence debate was concluded on 6 February, Huggins accepted an amendment moved by the Rhodesia Labour Party, and the confidence motion then passed without a division. Huggins had lost his chance for an election but gained endorsement of his government.

This situation did not last long. In July, the Coinage and Currency Bill was defeated by one vote on a clause which would have allowed the Currency Board to provide accommodation. Although this was a minor matter, Huggins argued that it was an issue of confidence because this provision had been agreed with the governments of Northern Rhodesia and Nyasaland in the Central African Council; as negotiations to form a new majority government failed, the Governor granted a dissolution.

Supporting Huggins' position, the South African general election in May that year had seen a win by the National Party which largely represented Afrikaners. This election marked a transfer of power away from the English-speaking South Africans and shocked the mostly British descended Southern Rhodesians, who recoiled from the Liberal Party who were backed by the small Rhodesian Afrikaner community; the Liberal Party's policy on race was similar to the National Party's policy of Apartheid.

Voters tended not to blame the government for the economic difficulties and petrol shortages which had affected Rhodesia in the years since the war, and the renewed push towards federation with Northern Rhodesia and Nyasaland also encouraged support for the United Party. In the end, it delivered a landslide for Huggins; Liberal Party leader Jacob Smit lost his seat.

== Electoral system ==
A Delimitation Commission was set up to redraw the boundaries of the electoral districts. Although the previous districts had only been drawn up in 1938, owing to the major population movements in the war none of the districts were unchanged.

== Franchise and electoral procedure ==
Two Acts passed in the run-up to the election made changes to electoral procedure. The Emergency Laws (Repeal and Transitional Provisions) Act, 1946 repealed most of the Active Service Voters Act, 1943 and therefore removed the ability of Southern Rhodesians serving in forces outside the colony to vote. The provision allowing postal votes to those living more than 10 miles from the polling station was retained.

The Electoral Amendment Act, 1946 made a further series of minor changes. It provided for a new full registration of voters once the delimitation had been completed, and facilitated the disqualification of imprisoned voters by requiring returns of those sentenced to prison. It also allowed candidates to withdraw before the poll.

== Results ==
| Party | Votes | % | Seats | +/– |
|---|---|---|---|---|
| United Party | 19,731 | 56.33 | 24 | +11 |
| Southern Rhodesia Liberal Party | 10,678 | 30.48 | 5 | –7 |
| Rhodesia Labour Party | 4,558 | 13.01 | 1 | –2 |
| Dominion Party | 61 | 0.17 | 0 | New |
| Total | 35,028 | 100.00 | 30 | 0 |
| Valid votes | 35,028 | 99.61 | | |
| Invalid/blank votes | 138 | 0.39 | | |
| Total votes | 35,166 | 100.00 | | |
| Registered voters/turnout | 47,840 | 73.51 | | |
Source: Willson

=== By constituency ===
- DP – Dominion Party
- Lab – Rhodesia Labour Party
- L – Liberal Party
- UP – United Party

| Constituency Electorate and turnout | Candidate | Party | Votes |
|---|---|---|---|
| AVONDALE; 1,962 (80.0%) | John Richard Dendy Young | UP | 1,021 |
| AVONDALE; 1,962 (80.0%) | †Albert Rubidge Washington Stumbles | L | 548 |
| BULAWAYO CENTRAL; 1,658 (73.9%) | †Donald MacIntyre | UP | 762 |
| BULAWAYO CENTRAL; 1,658 (73.9%) | William Hives Eastwood | Lab | 327 |
| BULAWAYO CENTRAL; 1,658 (73.9%) | Peter Bawtree Gibbs | L | 147 |
| BULAWAYO DISTRICT; 1,411 (77.3%) | Alexander Magnus Flett Stuart | UP | 647 |
| BULAWAYO DISTRICT; 1,411 (77.3%) | John Morrison Macdonald | L | 238 |
| BULAWAYO DISTRICT; 1,411 (77.3%) | Allan Watson Whittington | Lab | 205 |
| BULAWAYO EAST; 2,100 (81.7%) | Robert Francis Halsted | UP | 1,029 |
| BULAWAYO EAST; 2,100 (81.7%) | Ian Donald MacGillivray | L | 398 |
| BULAWAYO EAST; 2,100 (81.7%) | Leonard James Pearl | Lab | 288 |
| BULAWAYO NORTH; 1,567 (73.0%) | †Thomas Hugh William Beadle | UP | 905 |
| BULAWAYO NORTH; 1,567 (73.0%) | Mrs. Ethel Davies | Lab | 239 |
| BULAWAYO SOUTH; 1,657 (67.5%) | Henry Alfred Holmes | UP | 678 |
| BULAWAYO SOUTH; 1,657 (67.5%) | †James Stuart McNeillie | Lab | 441 |
| CHARTER; 1,206 (66.8%) | †Jacob Letterstedt Smit | L | 513 |
| CHARTER; 1,206 (66.8%) | Thomas John Mangwe Tilbury | UP | 293 |
| EASTERN; 1,495 (66.2%) | Tom Ian Findlay Wilson | UP | 631 |
| EASTERN; 1,495 (66.2%) | †Aubrey William Dunn | L | 359 |
| GATOOMA; 1,204 (67.4%) | †George Munro | L | 412 |
| GATOOMA; 1,204 (67.4%) | Graham Caldwell Elliott | UP | 399 |
| GWELO; 1,638 (75.0%) | Desmond William Lardner-Burke | UP | 626 |
| GWELO; 1,638 (75.0%) | †Robert Williamson | L | 518 |
| GWELO; 1,638 (75.0%) | Friedrich Ferdinand Ludwig Hein | Lab | 84 |
| HARTLEY; 1,130 (70.1%) | †Patrick Archibald Wise | L | 406 |
| HARTLEY; 1,130 (70.1%) | Ralph Drew Palmer | UP | 386 |
| HIGHLANDS; 2,218 (77.4%) | Robert Allan Ballantyne | UP | 937 |
| HIGHLANDS; 2,218 (77.4%) | †Charles Arden Bott | L | 690 |
| HIGHLANDS; 2,218 (77.4%) | William Rhodes Eades | Lab | 90 |
| HILLSIDE; 1,844 (82.0%) | Julius Macdonald Greenfield | UP | 677 |
| HILLSIDE; 1,844 (82.0%) | †Harry Herbert Davies | Lab | 570 |
| HILLSIDE; 1,844 (82.0%) | Olive Hope Robertson | L | 266 |
| LOMAGUNDI; 1,430 (73.7%) | †George Henry Hackwill | UP | 653 |
| LOMAGUNDI; 1,430 (73.7%) | John Scott | L | 401 |
| MARANDELLAS; 1,370 (71.6%) | Neville Gwynne Barrett | UP | 544 |
| MARANDELLAS; 1,370 (71.6%) | William Thomas Edward Fitzsimons | L | 437 |
| MAZOE; 1,267 (75.2%) | John Moore Caldicott | UP | 510 |
| MAZOE; 1,267 (75.2%) | Thomas Patrick Murray Cochran | L | 443 |
| QUE QUE; 1,382 (71.9%) | †George Arthur Davenport | UP | 559 |
| QUE QUE; 1,382 (71.9%) | Thomas Nangle | Lab | 269 |
| QUE QUE; 1,382 (71.9%) | Henry William Watt | L | 165 |
| RAYLTON; 1,627 (65.8%) | †Lawrence John Walter Keller | Lab | 615 |
| RAYLTON; 1,627 (65.8%) | Alexander Cockburn | UP | 337 |
| RAYLTON; 1,627 (65.8%) | Cecil Edward Mark Moore | L | 119 |
| SALISBURY CENTRAL; 1,628 (68.9%) | †Leslie Manfred Noel Hodson | UP | 722 |
| SALISBURY CENTRAL; 1,628 (68.9%) | David Symond Richards | L | 264 |
| SALISBURY CENTRAL; 1,628 (68.9%) | George Arthur Henry Radford | Lab | 135 |
| SALISBURY CITY; 1,729 (75.0%) | Bevis Alexander Barker | UP | 765 |
| SALISBURY CITY; 1,729 (75.0%) | †Jacob Hendrik Smit | L | 519 |
| SALISBURY CITY; 1,729 (75.0%) | Francis Michael Nilan | DP | 13 |
| SALISBURY DISTRICT; 2,076 (78.4%) | †Leslie Major Cullinan | UP | 1,082 |
| SALISBURY DISTRICT; 2,076 (78.4%) | William Graham | L | 545 |
| SALISBURY GARDENS; 1,587 (67.2%) | Noel St. Quinton | UP | 701 |
| SALISBURY GARDENS; 1,587 (67.2%) | Frank Henry Shepley Waller | L | 259 |
| SALISBURY GARDENS; 1,587 (67.2%) | Charles Olley | Lab | 107 |
| SALISBURY NORTH; 1,772 (76.8%) | †Godfrey Martin Huggins | UP | 1,024 |
| SALISBURY NORTH; 1,772 (76.8%) | Hugh Volant Wheeler | L | 337 |
| SALISBURY SOUTH; 2,683 (74.5%) | William Alexander Eustace Winterton | UP | 1,095 |
| SALISBURY SOUTH; 2,683 (74.5%) | †Denzil Crichton Paul | L | 713 |
| SALISBURY SOUTH; 2,683 (74.5%) | George Cyril Hamilton-Browne | Lab | 143 |
| SALISBURY SOUTH; 2,683 (74.5%) | Stewart Edward Aitken-Cade | DP | 48 |
| SELUKWE; 1,090 (68.5%) | Ian Douglas Smith | L | 361 |
| SELUKWE; 1,090 (68.5%) | Egon Aage Klifborg | Lab | 258 |
| SELUKWE; 1,090 (68.5%) | Petrus Johannes Cilliers | UP | 128 |
| SHABANI; 1,651 (69.2%) | †Reginald Stephen Garfield Todd | UP | 685 |
| SHABANI; 1,651 (69.2%) | Johannes Hendrik Hofmeyr | L | 458 |
| UMTALI; 1,914 (79.7%) | †Edgar Cuthbert Fremantle Whitehead | UP | 766 |
| UMTALI; 1,914 (79.7%) | †James Brown Lister | Lab | 648 |
| UMTALI; 1,914 (79.7%) | George Washington Chace | L | 112 |
| VICTORIA; 1,436 (71.4%) | †Raymond Osborne Stockil | L | 633 |
| VICTORIA; 1,436 (71.4%) | Richard Charles Ellis | UP | 393 |
| WANKIE; 1,169 (62.4%) | Humphrey Vicary Gibbs | UP | 376 |
| WANKIE; 1,169 (62.4%) | George Wilburn Rudland | L | 204 |
| WANKIE; 1,169 (62.4%) | William James Swift | Lab | 150 |
| WESTERN; 939 (65.3%) | †Patrick Bissett Fletcher | UP | 400 |
| WESTERN; 939 (65.3%) | Michael Vernon Rorke | L | 213 |

== Changes during the Assembly ==
=== Bulawayo District ===
Alexander Magnus Flett Stuart died on 7 August 1949, and a byelection to replace him was held on 13 October 1949.

| Constituency | Candidate | Party | Votes |
|---|---|---|---|
| BULAWAYO DISTRICT | William Hives Eastwood | Lab | 381 |
| BULAWAYO DISTRICT | John Morrison Macdonald | L | 351 |
| BULAWAYO DISTRICT | Peter George Hewison | UP | 288 |
| BULAWAYO DISTRICT | Sydney Henderson Millar | Ind | 89 |

=== Bulawayo North ===
Hugh Beadle resigned from the Assembly on 20 July 1950 to become a High Court judge. A byelection to fill his Assembly seat in Bulawayo North was held on 19 September 1950.

| Constituency Electorate and turnout | Candidate | Party | Votes |
|---|---|---|---|
| BULAWAYO NORTH; 1,925 (69.2%) | Cyril James Hatty | UP | 507 |
| BULAWAYO NORTH; 1,925 (69.2%) | James Stuart McNeillie | Lab | 471 |
| BULAWAYO NORTH; 1,925 (69.2%) | Eric Ashdown Smart | L | 354 |

=== Highlands ===
Robert Allan Ballantyne died on 5 February 1953. A byelection to replace him was held on 22 April 1953.

| Constituency Electorate and turnout | Candidate | Party | Votes |
|---|---|---|---|
| HIGHLANDS; 2,334 (77.7%) | William Addison | UP | 782 |
| HIGHLANDS; 2,334 (77.7%) | Frederick Daniel John Lacey | Lab | 531 |
| HIGHLANDS; 2,334 (77.7%) | Dickerson Colfax Byron-Moore | RP | 501 |
