= James Cowden =

Southern Rhodesian politician

James Cowden (born 1869) was a Southern Rhodesian politician who acted as Mayor of Bulawayo for four consecutive terms during the early 20th century. Born and educated in New South Wales, he moved to Johannesburg in 1896 and to Rhodesia the following year. He married Mary Ann (née Jones) in 1899, and had seven children. On 5 March 1920 he welcomed the first aircraft to land in Southern Rhodesia. A member of the Rhodesia Party, he served in the Southern Rhodesian Legislative Council as the member for Bulawayo Central from 1924 to 1939.

== See also ==
- List of mayors of Bulawayo

Civic offices
Preceded by W. J. Atterbury	Mayor of Bulawayo; 1919 – 1923	Succeeded by J. H. Bookless
Southern Rhodesian Legislative Assembly
Preceded by Edward Noaks	Member of Parliament for Bulawayo Central; 1924 – 1939; Served alongside: Hadfield/MacGillivray/MacIntyre	Succeeded by William Hives Eastwood
