= Jacob Smit =

Southern Rhodesian politician (1881–1959)

The Honourable Jacob Smit CMG

Leader of the Opposition in Southern Rhodesia
- In office 1946–1948
- Preceded by: Donald MacIntyre
- Succeeded by: Raymond Stockil

Minister of Finance and Commerce
- In office 1934 – January 1942
- Prime Minister: Godfrey Huggins
- Preceded by: Himself (as Minister of Finance)
- Succeeded by: Godfrey Huggins

Minister of Finance
- In office 1933–1934
- Prime Minister: Godfrey Huggins
- Preceded by: Percival Fynn
- Succeeded by: Himself (as Minister of Finance and Commerce)

Member of the Southern Rhodesian Legislative Assembly for Salisbury City
- In office 1939–1948
- Preceded by: New constituency
- Succeeded by: Bevis Alexander Barker

Member of the Southern Rhodesian Legislative Assembly for Salisbury Central
- In office 1933–1939
- Preceded by: New constituency
- Succeeded by: Edgar Pope Vernall

Member of the Southern Rhodesian Legislative Assembly for Salisbury South
- In office 1931–1933
- Preceded by: Gordon Ross Milne
- Succeeded by: George Henry Walker

Mayor of Salisbury
- In office 1927–1928

Personal details
- Born: Jacob Hendrik Smit; 3 September 1881 Hilversum, Netherlands
- Died: 22 July 1959 (aged 77)
- Party: Reform Party; United Party; Liberal Party
- Spouse: Dieta Smilda
- Children: 1
- Occupation: Merchant, politician

Jacob Hendrik Smit CMG (3 September 1881 – 22 July 1959) was a Dutch-born Southern Rhodesian merchant and politician. He served as Minister of Finance from 1933 to 1942 under Prime Minister Godfrey Huggins and as Leader of the Opposition from 1946 to 1948. A supporter of fiscal conservatism and closer economic ties with Britain, Smit resigned from Huggins' government in 1942 and subsequently led the Liberal Party.

== Early life and business career ==
Smit was born in Hilversum, the Netherlands, on 3 September 1881, the son of Samuel Marinus Smit and Aleyda Woutera van Wyland. Initially intending to become a teacher, he instead worked as a bank clerk before emigrating to the Transvaal around 1899. He moved to Beira in 1900, where he worked as a tobacconist, and settled in Salisbury, Southern Rhodesia, in 1905.

Smit initially sold goods from a barrow and later a mule cart. In 1914, he established a grocery and hardware business, which became commercially successful. He subsequently entered municipal politics, serving as a Salisbury town councillor and as mayor from 1927 to 1928. He was naturalised as a British subject in 1926.

== Political career ==
=== Minister of Finance ===
Smit entered the Southern Rhodesian Legislative Assembly in 1931 after winning a by-election in Salisbury South against the governing party. He joined the Reform Party in 1932 and was appointed Minister of Finance when Godfrey Huggins formed a government following the 1933 Southern Rhodesian general election. His portfolio was expanded to Finance and Commerce in 1934.

As finance minister, Smit introduced a state lottery and revised customs policies. He favoured closer commercial relations with the United Kingdom over greater economic integration with the Union of South Africa. His fiscal policies emphasised balanced budgets and limited government expenditure.

Smit was appointed a Companion of the Order of St Michael and St George (CMG) in the 1939 Birthday Honours.

=== Resignation and opposition leadership ===
Smit remained in Huggins' wartime coalition government but became increasingly dissatisfied with its economic policies, particularly proposals for greater government intervention during the Second World War. He was also excluded from Huggins' wartime Defence Committee. Smit resigned from the government in January 1942.

In 1943, he became leader of the newly formed Southern Rhodesia Liberal Party. The party sought to unite conservative opposition to Huggins' United Party, opposing economic regulation and the expansion of African political representation. It supported dominion status for Southern Rhodesia and opposed amalgamation with Northern Rhodesia.

At the 1946 Southern Rhodesian general election, the Liberal Party won 12 seats, making Smit Leader of the Opposition. His party was reduced to five seats in the 1948 Southern Rhodesian general election, and Smit lost his Salisbury City constituency. He was succeeded as opposition leader by Raymond Stockil.

Some contemporary observers attributed his electoral defeat partly to voters mistakenly identifying him as an Afrikaner and associating his party with South Africa's National Party.

== Personal life ==
Smit married Dieta Smilda in 1913. They had one son, John Walter Smit, a captain in the 3rd Battalion, Gold Coast Regiment, Royal West African Frontier Force, who was killed while serving in Burma in 1944.

Smit died on 22 July 1959, aged 77.

Southern Rhodesian Legislative Assembly
Preceded by Gordon Ross Milne	Member of Parliament for Salisbury South; 1931–1933; Served alongside: Harry Bertin	Succeeded by George Henry Walker
New constituency	Member of Parliament for Salisbury Central; 1933–1939; Served alongside: Neil Wilson / Robert Anderson	Succeeded by Edgar Pope Vernall
New constituency	Member of Parliament for Salisbury City; 1939–1948	Succeeded by Bevis Alexander Barker
Political offices
Preceded by Percival Fynn	Minister of Finance; 1933–1934	Succeeded by Himself as Minister of Finance and Commerce
Preceded by Himself as Minister of Finance	Minister of Finance and Commerce; 1934–1942	Succeeded by Godfrey Huggins
Preceded by Donald MacIntyre	Leader of the Opposition; 1946–1948	Succeeded by Raymond Stockil
