= George Hackwill =

English flying ace (1892–1954)

George Henry Hackwill
- Born: 22 December 1892; Langtree, North Devon, England
- Died: 4 July 1954 (aged 61); Southern Rhodesia
- Military career
- Allegiance: United Kingdom
- Branch: British Army; Royal Air Force
- Service years: 1914–1919
- Rank: Captain
- Units: Somerset Light Infantry; No. 22 Squadron RFC; No. 44 (HD) Squadron RFC; No. 54 Squadron RAF
- Conflicts: World War I
- Awards: Military Cross
- Other work: Member of the Southern Rhodesian Legislative Assembly

Captain George Henry Hackwill MC (22 December 1892 – 4 July 1954) was an English World War I flying ace credited with nine aerial victories. His most notable victory was his role in shooting down a German Gotha G.V, over Essex on the night of 28 January 1918. This was the first victory ever achieved in combat between aircraft at night.

== Early life ==
George Henry Hackwill was born in Langtree, North Devon, England. At the outbreak of the war he was an employee of the National Provincial Bank.

== World War I ==
After service in the Somerset Light Infantry at the start of the war, he transferred to the Royal Flying Corps in mid-1915, and received Royal Aero Club Aviator's Certificate No. 2292 after flying a Maurice Farman biplane at Military Flying School at Shoreham, Sussex, on 17 December 1915.

On 21 April 1916, he was appointed a flying officer as a temporary second lieutenant in the Somerset Light Infantry and transferred to the General List of the Royal Flying Corps, indicating he had completed training.

Hackwill was initially assigned to No. 22 Squadron, flying the F.E.2b two-seater. He gained his first victory on 21 July. Promoted to lieutenant on 31 August, he gained another victory on 20 October. He then served as an instructor for a while in 1917, before he was assigned to No. 44 (Home Defence) Squadron, flying the Sopwith Camel. On 1 October 1917 he was appointed a flight commander with the acting rank of captain.

His next aerial victory was a spectacular one; on 28 January 1918, Hackwill was flying a Sopwith "Comic" Camel, modified for night fighting, when he and Charles C. Banks shot down a Gotha G.V heavy bomber for the first victory over German night intruders attacking Britain. The Gotha came down near Wickford, Essex. The bodies of the three crewmen were recovered from the burnt out wreckage of the aircraft, but only Leutnant Friedrick von Thomsen could be identified. All three were given a military funeral on 2 February.

On 9 February 1918, Hackwill and Banks were awarded the Military Cross for this feat, the Cross being presented by King George V. Their citation, published in February 1918, read:

For conspicuous gallantry displayed when they engaged and shot down a Gotha raiding London. During the engagement, which lasted a considerable time, they were continually under fire from the enemy machine.

In March 1918 Hackwill returned to France to serve in No. 54 Squadron, and between 25 April and 15 September 1918 he scored six more victories. Not reflected in his victory list is the LVG he bombed and destroyed on 30 October 1918 while it sat on a German airfield he was raiding.

=== List of aerial victories ===
Combat record
| No. | Date/time | Aircraft | Foe | Result | Location | Notes |
|---|---|---|---|---|---|---|
| 1 | 21 July 1916 @ 2000 hours | Royal Aircraft Factory FE.2b; Serial number 5214 | Roland C reconnaissance plane | Destroyed | West of Beaulencourt | Observer/gunner: 2nd Lt W. B. Parsons |
| 2 | 20 October 1916 @ 0930 hours | Royal Aircraft Factory FE.2b s/n 4849 | Albatros D.I | Driven down out of control | Grévillers | Observer/gunner: Air Mechanic 1st Class Edwards |
| 3 | 25 January 1918 @ 2210 hours | Sopwith Camel s/n B2402 | Gotha G.V | Shot down and destroyed | Wickford, Essex | Shared with Lt. Charles C. Banks |
| 4 | 25 April 1918 @ 0730 hours | Sopwith Camel s/n D6517 | LVG reconnaissance plane | Driven down out of control | Southeast of Bailleul | |
| 5 | 4 July 1918 @ 1430 hours | Sopwith Camel s/n D6479 | Hannover reconnaissance plane | Driven down out of control | Harbonnières | |
| 6 | 5 July 1918 @ 1045 hours | Sopwith Camel s/n D6479 | Pfalz D.III | Driven down out of control | Chuignolles | |
| 7 | 25 July 1918 @ 1915 hours | Sopwith Camel s/n D9573 | Fokker D.VII | Destroyed | South of Bazoches | |
| 8 | 7 September 1918 @ 1910 hours | Sopwith Camel s/n F2144 | Halberstadt reconnaissance plane | Destroyed | Northeast of Marquion | Shared with Malcolm Burger & four other pilots |
| 9 | 15 September 1918 @ 1840 hours | Sopwith Camel s/n F2144 | Fokker D.VII | Driven down out of control | Ferin | |

== Post-war career ==
On 15 April 1919, Hackwill was moved to the unemployed list of the Royal Air Force.

Hackwill moved to Southern Rhodesia, and was elected to the Legislative Assembly as Member for Lomagundi district, representing the United Party, in a by-election on 27 August 1940. He was re-elected in the 1946 and 1948 general elections.

Hackwill died on 4 July 1954.

== Bibliography ==
- Franks, Norman (2003). Sopwith Camel Aces of World War 1: Volume 52 of Aircraft of the Aces. London, UK: Osprey Publishing. ISBN 978-1-84176-534-1.
- Shores, Christopher F.; Franks, Norman & Guest, Russell F. (1990). Above the Trenches: a Complete Record of the Fighter Aces and Units of the British Empire Air Forces 1915–1920. London, UK: Grub Street. ISBN 978-0-948817-19-9.
