= Raymond Stockil =

Southern Rhodesian politician

Sir Raymond Stockil KBE

Leader of the Opposition in Southern Rhodesia
- In office 1948–1954
- Preceded by: Jacob Smit
- Succeeded by: Position vacant
- In office 1958–1959
- Preceded by: Position vacant
- Succeeded by: Stewart Aitken-Cade

Personal details
- Born: Raymond Osborne Stockil; 1907 South Africa
- Died: 1982 (aged 74–75)
- Party: Liberal Party; Rhodesia Party; Dominion Party
- Education: Washington Missionary College
- Occupation: Politician, rancher

Sir Raymond Osborne Stockil (1907—1982) was a Southern Rhodesian politician and rancher who served as Leader of the Opposition in the Southern Rhodesian Legislative Assembly from 1948 to 1954 and again from 1958 to 1959. He was appointed a Knight Commander of the Order of the British Empire (KBE) in 1964.

== Early life ==
Born in South Africa to a missionary family, Stockil moved to Southern Rhodesia as a young man. He graduated from Washington Missionary College (now Washington Adventist University) in the United States and subsequently became a rancher in Southern Rhodesia.

== Political career ==
Stockil represented the Victoria constituency in the Southern Rhodesian Legislative Assembly. In the 1948 Southern Rhodesian general election, he was re-elected as a candidate of the Liberal Party, receiving 633 votes against 393 for his United Party opponent. Following the defeat of Liberal leader Jacob Smit, Stockil became Leader of the Opposition and led the party, subsequently renamed the Rhodesia Party.

Stockil advocated greater constitutional autonomy for Southern Rhodesia. On 3 May 1950, he introduced a parliamentary motion calling for constitutional changes that would remove restrictions on the colony's self-government and permit negotiations with Britain. He favoured the pursuit of Dominion status over the proposed Federation of Rhodesia and Nyasaland.

Stockil later became a leading figure in the Dominion Party, which opposed the Federation and advocated Southern Rhodesian independence. He again served as Leader of the Opposition from 1958 until his resignation in early 1959. He described the Federation as a failure and announced that he intended to concentrate on agricultural development rather than parliamentary politics. He did not contest another election.

== Honours ==
Stockil was appointed a Knight Commander of the Order of the British Empire (KBE) in 1964.
