= Rhodesia National Party =

Political party in Rhodesia

- Abbreviation: RNP
- Leader: Edgar Whitehead
- Founded: April 1963
- Dissolved: 1964
- Preceded by: United Federal Party
- Succeeded by: Rhodesia Party
- Headquarters: Salisbury, Rhodesia

The Rhodesia National Party (RNP) was a political party in Southern Rhodesia from 1963 to 1964. Led by former prime minister Edgar Whitehead, it was established in April 1963 as the Southern Rhodesian successor to the United Federal Party (UFP), following the UFP's reorganisation into separate parties in the territories of the Federation of Rhodesia and Nyasaland.

In August 1964, former federal prime minister Roy Welensky established the Rhodesia Party, which brought together much of the RNP and other opponents of the governing Rhodesian Front. The new party was subsequently led by Alan David Butler and lost its parliamentary representation in the 1965 Rhodesian general election.

== History ==
The Rhodesia National Party was founded in 1961 as the right wing of the United Federal Party. In 1963, the UFP split and the party became the Southern Rhodesian successor to the UFP and was led by Edgar Whitehead, the 6th premier of Southern Rhodesia. Whitehead was unanimously elected as the party president in October 1963, ending an attempted takeover by Roy Welensky supporters. The party had about 29 MPs which included 14 Africans. In 1963 the party did not support the effort of independence of Southern Rhodesia, but soon reversed their decision and that it was indeed prepared to discuss a united demand for independence with the Government.
