= John Keller =

John or Jack Keller may refer to:

- John Keller (basketball) (1928–2000), American basketball player
- Jack Keller (basketball) (1922–2012), American basketball player
- John Keller (boxer), (1910-1980), American Olympic boxer
- John Keller (handballer), (born 1965), American Olympic handballer
- John M. Keller (born 1938), American educational psychologist
- Jack Keller (hurdler) (1911–1978), American Olympic hurdler
- Jack Keller (artist) (1922–2003), Marvel Comics artist
- Jack Keller (poker player) (1942–2003), American poker player
- Jack Keller (songwriter) (1936–2005), American composer, songwriter and record producer

== See also ==
- Johnny Keller, murder victim
