= Donald MacIntyre (Rhodesian politician) =

Southern Rhodesian politician (1891–1978)

The Honourable Sir Donald MacIntyre CBE

Minister of Finance of the Federation of Rhodesia and Nyasaland
- In office 18 December 1953 – 3 September 1962
- Prime Minister: Godfrey Huggins; Roy Welensky
- Preceded by: Roy Welensky
- Succeeded by: John Moore Caldicott

Minister of Finance of Southern Rhodesia
- In office September 1953 – December 1953
- Prime Minister: Garfield Todd
- Preceded by: George Arthur Davenport (acting)
- Succeeded by: Garfield Todd

Leader of the Opposition in Southern Rhodesia
- In office 1940–1946
- Preceded by: Harry Davies
- Succeeded by: Jacob Smit

Mayor of Bulawayo
- In office 1944–1947
- In office 1936–1938

Member of the Southern Rhodesian Legislative Assembly
- Incumbent
- Assumed office 1933
- Constituency: Bulawayo

Personal details
- Born: 9 September 1891 Glasgow, Scotland
- Died: 24 October 1978 (aged 87)
- Party: Rhodesia Labour Party
- Occupation: Businessman, master baker, politician

Sir Donald MacIntyre Kt CBE (9 September 1891 – 24 October 1978) was a Scottish-born Southern Rhodesian businessman and politician. A leading figure in the Rhodesia Labour Party, he served as Leader of the Opposition in Southern Rhodesia from 1940 to 1946 and as Minister of Finance of the Federation of Rhodesia and Nyasaland from 1953 to 1962. He was also a long-serving member of the Bulawayo municipal council and served several terms as mayor.

== Early life and business career ==
MacIntyre was born in Glasgow on 9 September 1891. He emigrated to South Africa in 1915 and subsequently settled in Southern Rhodesia, where he established himself as a master baker and businessman.

His business interests included a café and confectionery factory in Bulawayo and bakeries in Salisbury and Gwelo. His commercial activities contributed to his prominence in Bulawayo's business and municipal affairs.

== Political career ==
=== Southern Rhodesian politics ===
MacIntyre was elected to the Southern Rhodesian Legislative Assembly as a Labour candidate for a Bulawayo constituency in 1933. He subsequently became a leading figure in the Rhodesia Labour Party.

During the Second World War, several Labour politicians joined Prime Minister Godfrey Huggins' coalition government. MacIntyre remained outside the coalition and became leader of the Rhodesia Labour Party and Leader of the Opposition in 1940. He held the latter position until 1946, when he was succeeded by Jacob Smit.

Although MacIntyre advocated socialist economic policies, his positions were sometimes criticised as inconsistent with his business interests. During a 1942 debate on the nationalisation of iron and steel, he supported state control in principle while arguing that shareholders should receive compensation. Huggins and Labour members of the government challenged his position, and fellow Labour politician Jack Keller criticised employment conditions in MacIntyre's businesses.

MacIntyre also opposed extending the Rhodesia Labour Party's organisation to African workers in Bulawayo. Historian Terence Ranger documented tensions between the party's more left-wing members and MacIntyre over African political participation and conditions in the city's African residential areas.

=== Municipal politics ===
MacIntyre served on the Bulawayo municipal council for approximately two decades. He was deputy mayor from 1934 to 1936 and mayor from 1936 to 1938 and again from 1944 to 1947. He chaired the council's finance committee from 1938 to 1943 and from 1947 to 1953, and its general purposes committee from 1943 to 1947.

As chairman of the finance committee, MacIntyre was involved in the administration of Bulawayo's African residential areas. Ranger criticised his reluctance to allocate municipal funds for improved housing and services, placing his policies within the wider system of racial segregation in Southern Rhodesian urban administration.

=== Minister of Finance ===
In September 1953, MacIntyre was appointed Minister of Finance in the Southern Rhodesian government of Garfield Todd. He held the position until December 1953, when he entered the government of the newly established Federation of Rhodesia and Nyasaland.

MacIntyre became federal Minister of Finance on 18 December 1953 under Prime Minister Godfrey Huggins. He retained the portfolio after Roy Welensky became federal prime minister in November 1956, serving until 3 September 1962, when he was succeeded by John Moore Caldicott. He also held the federal posts portfolio from 1956 to 1958.

== Honours ==
MacIntyre was appointed a Commander of the Order of the British Empire (CBE) in 1947 and was made a Knight Bachelor in 1961.

He died on 24 October 1978, aged 87.
