= Edgar Whitehead =

Rhodesian politician (1905–1971)

The Honourable Sir Edgar Whitehead KCMG OBE
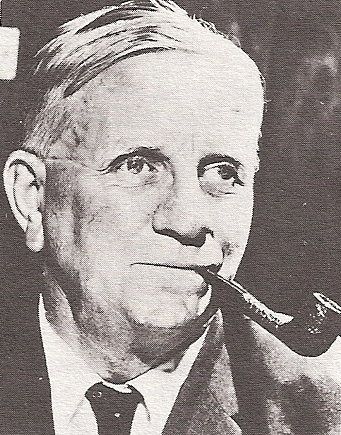

6th Prime Minister of Southern Rhodesia
- In office 17 February 1958 – 17 December 1962
- Monarch: Elizabeth II
- Governor: Sir Peveril William-Powlett; Sir Humphrey Gibbs
- Preceded by: Garfield Todd
- Succeeded by: Winston Field

Leader of the Opposition
- In office 17 December 1962 – 12 February 1965
- Prime Minister: Winston Field; Ian Smith
- Preceded by: William Cary
- Succeeded by: David Butler

Personal details
- Born: 8 February 1905 British Embassy, Berlin, German Empire
- Died: 22 September 1971 (aged 66) Newbury, Berkshire, United Kingdom
- Party: United Federal Party; Rhodesia National Party
- Education: University College, Oxford

Sir Edgar Cuthbert Fremantle Whitehead, KCMG OBE (8 February 1905 – 22 September 1971) was a Rhodesian politician and statesman who served as Prime Minister of Southern Rhodesia from 1958 to 1962. He had a long and varied political career, serving as a longstanding member of the Southern Rhodesian Legislative Assembly and in a variety of minister posts over the course of nearly three decades. simultaneously serving in a variety of government position posts. His work was frequently interrupted by recurring health problems; he suffered from poor eyesight and later experienced deafness whilst in office. An ally of Sir Roy Welensky, he was Prime Minister of Southern Rhodesia from 1958 to 1962. His government was defeated in the 1962 general election by the Rhodesian Front.

== Early life ==
Whitehead was born in the British Embassy in Berlin, where his father Sir James Beethom Whitehead was a diplomat. He was educated at Shrewsbury School and University College, Oxford, and moved to the colony of Southern Rhodesia in 1928 for health reasons. After working briefly for the civil service at Gwelo, he moved to a farm in the Bvumba Mountains near Umtali. Whitehead became active in the local farming unions.

== Participation in the Second World War ==
He became a member of the Southern Rhodesian Legislative Assembly in 1939, but his service was interrupted by the Second World War. During the Second World War, he was in West Africa and was an Air Despatcher with the Royal Air Force in the United Kingdom. He served as Acting High Commissioner for Southern Rhodesia in London from 1945 to 1946, before returning to Salisbury as Minister of Finance and Minister of Posts and Telegraphs from September 1946 to March 1947. During the Federation period, Whitehead served as Minister for Rhodesia & Nyasaland Affairs in Washington, D.C. from 1957 to 1958.

Following a cabinet revolt which brought about the resignation of the liberal Garfield Todd in 1958, Whitehead was chosen as the compromise candidate for his United Federal Party's leadership. Recalled from Washington, a by-election for the seat of Hillside in Bulawayo was held on 16 April 1958 to elect him to parliament, which Whitehead lost the opposition Dominion Party candidate, Jack Pain. Whitehead then called general elections and entered parliament as member for the Salisbury North constituency, becoming Prime Minister and Minister for Native Affairs.

== Liberal rule ==
His near five years in office saw continued rapid economic growth but also the beginnings of the dismantling of the Central African Federation against the wishes of his party. He was crucial in the negotiation of the 1961 constitution, which increased black representation in the Southern Rhodesian parliament. There was a relaxation of racial discrimination laws and a drive to enroll black voters during his period of office, but this was done against a background of civil unrest and a tightening of security measures.

The policies of Whitehead's government caused alarm among the white population, while the blacks remained dissatisfied with the advances they had made. The conservative Rhodesian Front, led by Winston Field, defeated the UFP in the 1962 elections, riding upon opposition to the new constitution and Whitehead's relatively liberal views on race, winning 35 of 50 white seats. Of the 15 seats for blacks, the UFP won 14.

Whitehead was Leader of the Opposition in Parliament from 1962 until February 1965. He later lost his seat in the May 1965 election when the Rhodesian Front took all the white seats in Parliament. The Rhodesian Front, from 1964 under the leadership of Ian Smith, would rule Rhodesia until 1979.

Alec Douglas-Home in his memoir 'The Way the Wind Blows' noted his view of Whitehead as being very deaf, very blind and able to consume 13 beers in an evening without leaving the room. He was a bachelor and was seen by former Federation Minister Julian Greenfield in his memoirs (page 234) as having even less charisma than Edward Heath with voters, whether male or female.

== Retirement ==
After leaving politics, Whitehead retired back to the United Kingdom to live with his sister near Whitchurch in Hampshire. From there he called for a union between the UK and Rhodesia as a way forward following UDI. He died of cancer of the oesophagus and lung in a nursing home in Hamstead Marshall near Newbury in September 1971. A plaque to him in Salisbury (now Harare) Cathedral Cloisters was unveiled by former Governor Sir Humphrey Gibbs in 1972. His papers, including an unpublished autobiography, are in the Rhodes House Library, Oxford.

== Honours ==
Appointed an Officer of the Order of the British Empire (OBE) in 1944, in the 1952 New Year Honours Whitehead was appointed a Companion of the Order of St Michael and St George (CMG). In the 1954 Birthday Honours he was knighted as a Knight Commander of the Order of St Michael and St George (KCMG) for "public services rendered in connection with the setting up of the Federation of Rhodesia and Nyasaland".

Southern Rhodesian Legislative Assembly
Preceded by Donald Murray Somerville	Member of Parliament for Umtali North; 1939–1940	Succeeded by Tom Ian Findlay Wilson
Preceded by Tom Ian Findlay Wilson	Member of Parliament for Umtali North; 1946–1948	Constituency abolished
New constituency	Member of Parliament for Umtali; 1948–1953	Succeeded by Humphrey Wightwick
Preceded by Harold Holderness	Member of Parliament for Salisbury North; 1958–1965	Succeeded by Andre Holland
Political offices
Preceded by Sir Ernest Lucas Guest	Minister of Finance; 1946–1953	Succeeded by Donald MacIntyre
New title	Minister of Posts and Telegraphs; 1951–1953	Succeeded by Donald MacIntyre
Preceded by Garfield Todd	Prime Minister of Southern Rhodesia; 1958–1962	Succeeded by Winston Field
Preceded by Eric Drew Palmer	Minister of Native Affairs; 1958–1960	Succeeded by Herbert Quinton
Preceded by William Cary	Leader of the Opposition; 1962–1965	Succeeded by David Butler
