= Southern Rhodesia Liberal Party =

- Founded: 1943
- Dissolved: 1950s
- Merged into: Rhodesian Front
- Headquarters: Salisbury
- Ideology: Conservatism; Illiberalism; White minority interests Anti-economic interventionism
- Political position: Right-wing

The Southern Rhodesian Liberal Party was a political party in Southern Rhodesia, founded in 1943 by Jacob Smit (1881–1959), the former United Party (UP) Minister of Finance. It was dissolved in the 1950s.

== History ==
It is thought that Smit split from the UP largely because Prime Minister Sir Godfrey Martin Huggins had failed to include him in the exclusive Second World War Defence Committee. Smit then set up the Liberal Party to base their policy upon that of the recently dissolved Reform Party.

In his A History of Rhodesia, Robert Blake writes that Smit's party, "in accordance with the Rhodesian tradition of adopting the most misleading political nomenclature possible, called themselves 'Liberals.'" The party was, in fact, pronouncedly illiberal, and attempted to unite conservative, non-trade union opposition to the UP while opposing government economic regulation and the advancement of Black political interests. An English-born Member of the Southern Rhodesian House of Assembly noted that "The Liberal Party were not Liberal...". The Southern Rhodesian Chief Medical Officer Andrew Paton Martin joined the Liberal Party but due to ill-health, was unable to actively partake in politics.

The Liberal Party did well in the 1946 general election, winning 12 out of 30 seats in the Southern Rhodesia Legislative Assembly, which forced the United Party to govern as a minority government. But in the 1948 general election it won only five seats and its support declined subsequently, despite the future Prime Minister Ian Smith being elected as one of their members. It was to become one of the political precursors to the future Rhodesian Front (RF) party.

== See also ==
- United Federal Party
