= Garfield Todd =

Southern Rhodesian politician (1908–2002)

Reverend The Honourable Sir Garfield Todd
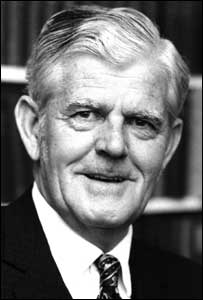

5th Prime Minister of Southern Rhodesia
- In office 7 September 1953 – 17 February 1958
- Monarch: Elizabeth II
- Governor: Sir John Kennedy; Sir Robert Tredgold; Sir Peveril William-Powlett
- Preceded by: Sir Godfrey Huggins
- Succeeded by: Edgar Whitehead

Personal details
- Born: 13 July 1908 Invercargill, New Zealand
- Died: 13 October 2002 (aged 94) Bulawayo, Zimbabwe
- Party: United Rhodesia Party; United Federal Party
- Spouse: Jean Grace Wilson (m. 1932)
- Children: Judith Todd; Alycen Watson; Cynthia Gay Todd
- Education: University of Otago; Witwatersrand University; Butler University

Sir Reginald Stephen Garfield Todd (13 July 1908 – 13 October 2002) was a liberal Prime Minister of Southern Rhodesia from 1953 to 1958 and later became an opponent of white minority rule in Rhodesia.

== Background ==
Todd was born in 1908 in Invercargill, New Zealand, and was of Scottish descent. He was educated at Otago University, Glen Leith Theological College, and the University of the Witwatersrand. At Glen Leith, he took homiletics, elocution and logic. In 1932, he married Jean Grace Wilson, with whom he had three daughters, the second of whom is the Zimbabwean political activist, Judith Todd.

Todd emigrated to Southern Rhodesia from New Zealand in 1934 as a Protestant missionary and ran the Dadaya New Zealand Churches of Christ Mission school. One of the primary-school teachers in his charge was Robert Mugabe. Though he had no formal medical training, Todd and his wife, Grace, set up a clinic where he delivered hundreds of babies and treated minor injuries. His ranch, Hokonui, was named after the hills in his home province of Southland.

== Political involvement ==
In 1948, Todd won election to parliament. He succeeded Sir Godfrey Martin Huggins as leader of the United Rhodesia Party and Prime Minister of Southern Rhodesia in 1953 when Huggins became the inaugural Prime Minister of the newly established Federation of Rhodesia and Nyasaland.

From 1955 to 1960, Todd served as first vice-president of the World Convention of Churches of Christ.

== Government ==
Todd introduced modest reforms aimed at improving the education of the black majority by taking tax-money paid by Rhodesian property owners and appropriations from the British colonial authorities, and directing it toward black schools. His government introduced a plan to give elementary education to every African of school age. He doubled the number of primary schools and gave grants to missionary-run schools to introduce secondary school and pre-university courses for blacks.

He also introduced the appellation "Mr" for blacks instead of "AM" ("African Male") and ended the prohibition on the sale of alcohol to black residents of the reserves, who were allowed to drink European beer and wine, though not spirits.

Todd pushed a bill through the Legislative Assembly, allowing for multiracial trade unions, thereby undercutting the growing white nationalist influence in the unions. Lastly, in a bid to increase the number of blacks eligible to vote from 2% to 16% of the electorate, he moved to lower property and education qualifications, but this was rejected.

In response, Todd's ministers resigned en bloc, and following the appointment of a new cabinet, his party forced him out of power; three months later, he was replaced as party leader and Prime Minister by Edgar Whitehead.

In a farewell statement, he said "We must make it possible for every individual to lead the good life, to win a place in the sun. We are in danger of becoming a race of fear-ridden neurotics – we who live in the finest country on Earth."

In addition to prime ministership, Todd was Minister of Finance and several other portfolios. He was granted retention of the title The Honourable in October 1958, for having served more than three years on the executive council.

== Later life ==
After helping to co-ordinate the isolation and embargo of Rhodesia, and especially after his support for legitimising guerrilla activity by black nationalists, Todd was widely condemned as a traitor by white Rhodesians. When the Smith Government was ultimately forced to give up power and the nation became the independent state of Zimbabwe in 1980, Todd was immediately considered for appointment to the new black government for his "collaborating" role. Lord Soames, following the recommendation of Prime Minister-elect Robert Mugabe, appointed Todd to the Senate on 8 April 1980, where Todd served until his retirement in 1985. After years of supporting Mugabe, Todd became disillusioned with the new regime due to its blatant violence against political opponents. He was appointed a Knight Bachelor, for services to Africa and New Zealand, by Queen Elizabeth II in the 1986 New Year Honours, at the instigation of the New Zealand government.

In 1984, Todd's daughter, Judith Todd, was raped by a senior officer in Mugabe's military. The rape was perpetrated after she criticised the genocide of Ndebele civilians, the traditional opponents of Mugabe's own tribe. She became a strong critic of the regime of Robert Mugabe.

During retirement, Todd donated 3,000 acres (12 km^{2}) of his ranch to former guerillas who had been maimed in the Rhodesian Bush War. Nonetheless, Todd's criticism of Mugabe intensified and, in 2002, he was stripped of Zimbabwean nationality. He died, aged 94, on 13 October 2002, in Bulawayo.

== Notes ==
Southern Rhodesian Legislative Assembly
Preceded by Leslie Thomas Smith	Member of Parliament for Insiza; 1946–1948	Constituency abolished
New constituency	Member of Parliament for Shabani; 1948–1958	Succeeded by Ian Birt Dillon
Political offices
Preceded by Sir Godfrey Huggins	Prime Minister of Southern Rhodesia; 1953–1958	Succeeded by Edgar Whitehead
Preceded by William Winterton	Minister of Trade and Industrial Development; 1953–1954	Succeeded by Geoffrey Ellman-Brown
Preceded by Donald MacIntyre	Minister of Finance; 1953–1954	Succeeded by Cyril Hatty
Preceded by Donald MacIntyre	Minister of Posts and Telegraphs; 1953–1954	Succeeded by Cyril Hatty
Preceded by Julius Greenfield as Minister of Internal Affairs and Minister of Justice	Minister of Internal Affairs and Justice; 1954	Succeeded by Rubidge Stumbles as Minister of Justice and Internal Affairs
New title	Minister of Labour; 1956–1958	Succeeded by Alan Lloyd
New title	Minister of Native Education; 1956–1957	Succeeded by Rubidge Stumbles
Preceded by Alan Lloyd as Minister of Labour	Minister of Labour and Social Welfare; 1958	Succeeded by Sir George Davenport
