= Godfrey Huggins =

Rhodesian politician and physician

The Right Honourable The Viscount Malvern CH KCMG PC KStJ FRCS
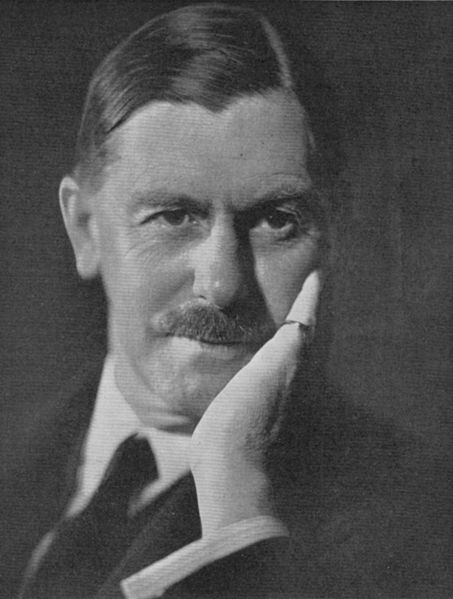
- Huggins in 1936

1st Prime Minister of the Federation of Rhodesia and Nyasaland
- In office 7 September 1953 – 2 November 1956
- Monarch: Elizabeth II
- Governor General: Lord Llewellin
- Succeeded by: Sir Roy Welensky

4th Prime Minister of Southern Rhodesia
- In office 12 September 1933 – 7 September 1953
- Monarchs: George V; Edward VIII; George VI; Elizabeth II
- Governor: Sir Cecil Hunter-Rodwell; Sir Evelyn Baring; Sir Campbell Tait; Sir John Kennedy
- Preceded by: George Mitchell
- Succeeded by: Garfield Todd

Personal details
- Born: Godfrey Martin Huggins; 6 July 1883 Bexley, Kent, United Kingdom
- Died: 8 May 1971 (aged 87) Salisbury, Rhodesia
- Party: Reform Party; United Federal Party; United Rhodesia Party
- Education: St. Thomas's Hospital

Godfrey Martin Huggins, 1st Viscount Malvern CH KCMG PC KStJ FRCS (6 July 1883 – 8 May 1971), was a Rhodesian politician and physician. He served as the fourth Prime Minister of Southern Rhodesia from 1933 to 1953 and remained in office as the first prime minister of the Federation of Rhodesia and Nyasaland until October 1956, becoming the longest serving prime minister in British Commonwealth history, until 1961.

== Early life and education ==
Huggins was born at 'Dane Cottage', Knoll Road, Bexley in northern Kent, England (now a borough of London), the second child, but eldest son of a stockbroker. The family later moved to a property his father built, 'Shore House' in Sevenoaks, a town 27 miles from London. He was educated at Brunswick House, a preparatory school in Hove and then moved to Sutherland House, a similar school in Folkestone.

He suffered a severe infection of the left middle ear at the age of 11, which left him deaf on that side and delayed his move to Malvern College in 1898, a school from which he later took part of his title. From there he moved on to study medicine at St. Thomas's Hospital, London, after some difficulty obtaining the necessary entrance qualifications.

After practising medicine and training as a surgeon in London, spending some time as a Resident Superintendent at Great Ormond Street Hospital, Huggins travelled to Salisbury, Southern Rhodesia, in 1911, initially to act as a locum to some doctors there, but eventually deciding to stay on.

== First World War ==
Huggins returned to the UK in late 1914 following the outbreak of war and joined the Royal Army Medical Corps with the rank of lieutenant from October 1914. Huggins was first stationed at Colchester Hospital in Essex, which had become a casualty clearing station. Although he wanted to go to France, he was sent to Malta where he dealt with incoming casualties from the Battle of Gallipoli.

Promoted to the rank of captain in March 1916, doctors only had to serve for a year at that point in the war, and so in 1916 Huggins went out again to Southern Rhodesia but returned to the UK within a few months. This time he was posted to the Hammersmith Orthopaedic Hospital and then the Pavilion Hospital in Brighton. In 1917, he finally got to go to France with the 5th Cavalry Field Ambulance, attached to the 2nd Cavalry Division near Amiens. His surgical work at this time led to his writing a book, Amputation Stumps: Their Care and After Treatment (Frowde, Hodder & Stoughton, London 1918).

== Practice in Southern Rhodesia ==
He returned to Southern Rhodesia at the end of the war, just in time to deal with the 1918 influenza epidemic, and bought Craig Farm on the outskirts of Salisbury, now Harare, which was to remain his home for the rest of his life. He began again as a surgeon, quickly becoming the best known, albeit in a small field, in Southern Rhodesia. He married in 1921 to Blanche Slatter of Pietermaritzburg, the daughter (some sources say stepdaughter) of a Major in the South African Constabulary. He and his wife had two sons, born in 1922 and 1928.

Having become a spokesman for the local Comrades of the Great War Association, he began to have contact with government, intervening for the Association with the then-Administrator, Sir Drummond Chaplin. Although he was on the side of union with South Africa when there was a referendum on the matter in 1922, he accepted the Southern Rhodesian decision to 'go it alone' and accept responsible government.

== Political career ==
He entered politics in 1924 as a Rhodesia Party member and was elected, unopposed, in the Salisbury North constituency, to the Southern Rhodesian Legislative Assembly of the newly created self-governing colony. In 1932, he broke with the Rhodesia Party government led by Howard Unwin Moffat when it introduced a measure to cut civil service salaries by 10%; a cut that was especially unpopular in Huggins's constituency which had a large number of civil servants. Huggins could not vote against the government without precipitating an early general election, something he did not wish to do as an election was already scheduled for the next year. Instead, Huggins voted for the bill and then crossed the floor the next day to join the newly formed Reform Party which appointed Huggins Leader of the Opposition.

=== Prime minister ===
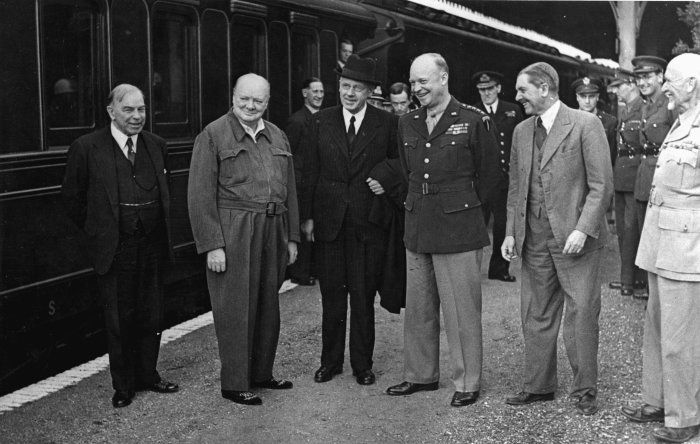
Huggins (second from right) with Canada's Mackenzie King, Britain's Winston Churchill, New Zealand's Peter Fraser, U.S. General Dwight D. Eisenhower and South Africa's Field Marshal Jan Smuts, in England just before the Normandy landings in June 1944

Huggins became Prime Minister of Southern Rhodesia following the 1933 general election which his Reform Party won by a one-seat majority with 16 out of 30 seats in the Legislative Assembly. The Reform Party's platform included measures such as the creation of a central bank and various economic, credit and monetary reforms designed to provide support for the white working class during the Great Depression. The Reform Party was believed by many in Rhodesia to be a left-wing party but Huggins presented a cautiously conservative Cabinet after winning power in 1933. In particular, Finance Minister Jacob Smit was a strong believer in conventional economics and opponent of Keynesianism. The course of government led eventually to a confrontation in August 1934 with the left wing of the party over reform to the Rhodesian Railways. Huggins decided to approach Sir Percy Fynn, leader of the Rhodesia Party, who pledged support for a National Government under Huggins.

However, the acting Governor refused a dissolution on the grounds that the Assembly had many years left, and the government had not been defeated. Huggins persuaded the majority of the Executive of the Reform Party to suspend the party's constitution to allow a National Government on 17 September, and then formed the United Party with Fynn, asking a second time for a dissolution on the basis of a changed party alignment. This time the Acting Governor acceded.

The November 1934 election resulted in a landslide for Huggins' United Party, which won 24 out of 30 seats, while the Reform Party returned only one seat in the new legislature. Huggins himself switched electoral districts and ran and defeated Reform Party MP Thomas Nangle who had been one of the Reform Party's founders. In addition to prime ministership, Huggins was the Minister of Finance on several occasions.

Huggins was made a Knight Commander of the Order of St Michael and St George (KCMG) in the 1941 New Year Honours, and appointed to the Privy Council of the United Kingdom, granting the title "The Right Honourable", in the 1947 Birthday Honours. He was a guest at the 1947 wedding of Princess Elizabeth and Philip, Duke of Edinburgh.

== Federation of Rhodesia and Nyasaland ==
Huggins became an advocate of federating Southern Rhodesia with some of the neighbouring British colonies in the region so that they would become an independent state within the British Empire while maintaining white minority rule with only a small number of educated blacks having the vote in addition to white settlers. As a result of his efforts, the Federation of Rhodesia and Nyasaland was created in 1953 uniting Northern Rhodesia, Southern Rhodesia and Nyasaland, with Huggins as the federation's first prime minister after his new United Federal Party won the federation's first general election. Huggins remained in office until October 1956 and was elevated to the Peerage of the United Kingdom as Viscount Malvern in March 1955, over a year and a half before his retirement. He was succeeded as federal prime minister by Sir Roy Welensky. The biggest political issue of his tenure as federal prime minister was the question of race relations. Huggins and other proponents of Federation claimed to stand for a policy of partnership, which was claimed to be much more enlightened than the apartheid that the new Nationalist Party government was then installing in South Africa. He compared it to "the partnership of rider and horse." The following quotation, from a speech he made to the Federal Assembly on 28 July 1954, against a motion to enforce equal treatment of the races, illustrates Huggins's attitude towards black Africans:

You cannot expect Europeans to form in a queue with dirty people, possibly an old mfazi with an infant on her back, mewling and puking and making a mess of everything... It is perfectly obvious to anyone that the system we have in Southern Rhodesia at the present time is the most satisfactory to both sides and it is certainly impossible to alter it until the hon. leaders of the African people have cleaned up their brother Africans a bit; and then we can perhaps consider it.

Having served 23 years as prime minister, Lord Malvern, as he now was, became the longest-serving prime minister in British Commonwealth history, beating the records of Mackenzie King of Canada and Sir Robert Walpole of Great Britain and Ireland. He is the only prime minister in British Commonwealth history to serve under four monarchs (George V, Edward VIII, George VI, and Elizabeth II). Lord Malvern's successor, Welensky, spent his time in office trying to prevent an inevitable break-up of the Federation.

Lord Malvern lived out the remainder of his life in Southern Rhodesia, continuing his quiet retirement under the territory's Unilateral Declaration of Independence (UDI) administration. He died in May 1971 aged 87.

== Honours ==
=== Medals and awards ===
Viscount Malvern, of Rhodesia and of Bexley in the County of Kent	18 March 1955
Member of His Majesty's Most Honourable Privy Council	KB 1947
Member of the Order of the Companions of Honour (CH)	4 August 1944
Knight Commander of the Order of St Michael and St George (KCMG)	NY 1941
Knight of the Order of St John of Jerusalem (KStJ)	NY 1937
1914–15 Star	
British War Medal	
Victory Medal	

=== Honorific eponyms ===
- Godfrey Huggins School of Medicine, University of Rhodesia
- Godfrey Huggins Primary School, Marondera
- Lord Malvern High School, Salisbury
- Malvern House, Peterhouse Boys' School

=== Grant of Arms ===
Coat of arms of Godfrey Huggins
Crest A lion sejant rampant guardant Or the sinister paw resting on a fountain. Escutcheon Argent on a Fess Sable between three Hearts Gules a Lion passant guardant Or. Supporters Dexter, a lion guardant Gules grasping in the exterior forepaw a rod of Aesculapius proper. Sinister, a Sable antelope guardant Proper. Motto Cuncti Perseveramus (Let us all persevere together)

== Bibliography ==
- Gelfand, M.; Gann, L. H. (1964). Huggins of Rhodesia: The Man and His Country. London: Allen and Unwin.
- Gelfand, M. (1971). "Godfrey Martin Huggins, Viscount Malvern 1883–1971, His Life and Work". Central African Journal of Medicine. Salisbury, Rhodesia.
- Welensky, Roy. Welensky's 4000 Days. London: Collins.

Southern Rhodesian Legislative Assembly
New constituency	Member of Parliament for Salisbury North; 1924–1934; Served alongside: Fynn	Succeeded by Vernon Arthur Lewis
Preceded by Thomas Nangle	Member of Parliament for Salisbury District; 1934–1939	Constituency abolished
Preceded by Percival Fynn; Harry Bertin	Member of Parliament for Salisbury North; 1939–1954	Succeeded by Harold Holderness
Political offices
Preceded by George Mitchell	Prime Minister of Southern Rhodesia; 1933–1953	Succeeded by Garfield Todd
Preceded by George Mitchell	Minister of Native Affairs; 1933–1942	Succeeded by Robert Clarkson Tredgold
Preceded by Jacob Hendrik Smit	Minister of Finance and Commerce; 1942	Succeeded by Max Danziger
Preceded by Robert Clarkson Tredgold	Minister of Defence; 1943–1944	Succeeded by Frank Ernest Harris
Preceded by Harry Bertin	Minister of Native Affairs; 1944–1949	Succeeded by William Winterton
Preceded by Sir Ernest Lucas Guest	Minister of Defence; 1948–1953	Succeeded by George Arthur Davenport
Party political offices
Preceded by Robert Gilchrist	Leader of the Reform Party; 1932–1934	Succeeded by
New political party	Leader of the United Rhodesia Party; 1934–1953	Succeeded by Garfield Todd
Rhodesia and Nyasaland Federal Assembly
New title	Member of Federal Parliament for Salisbury Suburbs; 1953–1956	Succeeded by Sidney Sawyer
Political offices
New title	Prime Minister of the Federation of Rhodesia and Nyasaland; 1953–1956	Succeeded by Sir Roy Welensky
New title	Minister of External Affairs and Defence; 1953	Succeeded by Himself
Preceded by Himself	Minister of External Affairs; 1953–1956	Succeeded by Sir Roy Welensky
Preceded by Himself	Minister of Defence; 1953–1956	Succeeded by Sir Roy Welensky
Party political offices
New political party	Leader of the Federal Party; 1953–1956	Succeeded by Sir Roy Welensky
Peerage of the United Kingdom
New creation	Viscount Malvern; 1955–1971	Succeeded by John Godfrey Huggins
