= Roy Welensky =

Northern Rhodesian politician (1907–1991)

The Right Honourable Sir Roy Welensky KCMG JP
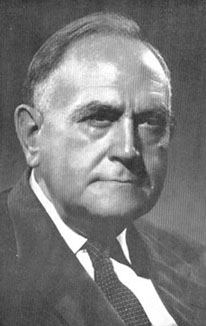

2nd Prime Minister of the Federation of Rhodesia and Nyasaland
- In office 2 November 1956 – 31 December 1963
- Monarch: Elizabeth II
- Governors General: Lord Llewellin; Sir Robert Tredgold; Sir William Murphy; The Earl of Dalhousie; Sir Humphrey Gibbs
- Preceded by: Godfrey Huggins
- Succeeded by: Federation dissolved
- Constituency: Broken Hill

Personal details
- Born: Raphael Welensky; 20 January 1907 Salisbury, Southern Rhodesia (now Harare, Zimbabwe)
- Died: 5 December 1991 (aged 84) Blandford Forum, England
- Party: United Federal Party
- Spouses: Elizabeth Henderson (deceased); Valerie Scott
- Occupation: locomotive enginedriver

Sir Roland "Roy" Welensky KCMG PC JP (né Raphael Welensky; 20 January 1907 – 5 December 1991) was a Northern Rhodesian politician and the second and last Prime Minister of the Federation of Rhodesia and Nyasaland.

Born in Salisbury, Southern Rhodesia (now Harare, Zimbabwe) to an Afrikaner mother and a Lithuanian Jewish father, he moved to Northern Rhodesia, became involved with the trade unions, and entered the colonial legislative council in 1938. There, he campaigned for the amalgamation of Northern and Southern Rhodesia (the latter under white self-government, the former under the colonial office). Although unsuccessful, he succeeded in the formation of the Federation of Rhodesia and Nyasaland, a state within the British Empire that sought to retain predominant power for the white minority while moving in a progressive political direction, in contrast to South Africa under the apartheid system.

Becoming Prime Minister of the Federation in 1956, Welensky opposed British moves towards black majority rule, and he used force to suppress politically motivated violence in the territories. After the advent of black majority rule in two of the Federation's three territories (Northern Rhodesia and Nyasaland, now Zambia and Malawi, respectively), the Federation collapsed in 1963. Welensky retired to Salisbury, where he re-entered politics and attempted to stop Rhodesia (formerly Southern Rhodesia) from unilaterally declaring itself independent. Following the end of white minority rule in 1979, and the recognised independence of Rhodesia as the Republic of Zimbabwe under Robert Mugabe in 1980, Welensky emigrated to the United Kingdom, where he died in England in 1991. A fervent admirer of Britain and its Empire, Welensky described himself as "half Jewish, half Afrikaner [and] 100% British".

== Youth ==
Welensky was born in Pioneer Street, Salisbury, Southern Rhodesia. His father, Michael Welensky (b. c. 1843), was of Lithuanian Jewish origin, hailing from a village near Wilno (today Vilnius); a trader in Russia and horse-smuggler during the Franco-Prussian War, he settled in Southern Rhodesia after first emigrating to the United States, where he was a saloon-keeper, and then South Africa. His mother, Leah (born Aletta Ferreira; c. 1865–1918), was a ninth-generation Afrikaner of Dutch and Portuguese ancestry. His parents, for whom Raphael or "Roy" was the thirteenth child, kept a "poor white" boarding house. Welensky's mother died when he was eleven years old, being treated by Godfrey Huggins, a doctor who went on to become the prime minister of Southern Rhodesia. Although not of British ancestry, Welensky was intensely pro-British, a distinctive sentiment among Rhodesians. John Connell, in his foreword to Welensky's book 4000 Days, wrote: "Welensky, who had not a drop of British blood in his veins, shared this pride and loyalty [towards Britain] to the full."

After leaving school at the age of fourteen, Welensky found employment with Rhodesia Railways as a fireman, while putting his physical strength to work as a boxer. He rose through the ranks of Rhodesia Railways to become a locomotive engine driver and became involved in the trade union movement, joining the Rhodesian Railway Workers' Union. After participating in the unsuccessful 1929 Rhodesian Railways strike, Welensky was moved by management to Broken Hill, the main base of the railways in Northern Rhodesia. In 1933, he became Chairman of the Broken Hill branch of the union, and was appointed to the National Council.

While working on the railways, he became the professional heavyweight boxing champion of Southern Rhodesia at 19 years old and held the position until he was 21. During this time, Welensky met his first wife, Elizabeth Henderson, who was working at a café in Bulawayo, Southern Rhodesia at the time. They married after a two-year courtship.

== Colonial politics ==
Welensky was elected to the Northern Rhodesian Legislative Council in the 1938 general elections. The Governor of Northern Rhodesia prevented Welensky from enlisting in the armed forces during World War II and appointed him Director of Manpower. In 1941, he formed his own party, the Northern Rhodesian Labour Party, seeking to amalgamate the colony with Southern Rhodesia under a new constitution. The party won all five seats it contested in the 1941 elections. After the leader of the unofficial members in the Legislative Council, Stewart Gore-Browne, resigned in 1945 and stated that black Africans had lost confidence in the whites (due to the wish for amalgamation), Welensky was elected leader. Although a member of the Legislative Council, this was not a full-time job, and he continued working as a train driver for Rhodesia Railways, and also as a Trade Union leader.

== Amalgamation and federation ==
From the beginning, Welensky was involved in the creation of the Federation of Rhodesia and Nyasaland. He had earlier wanted an amalgamation of Northern and Southern Rhodesia with a constitution similar to that of Southern Rhodesia (that had effectively granted responsible government to the white Rhodesians by specifying franchise qualifications that few blacks had so far achieved - though they were not prevented from acquiring them). After the British Government rejected this idea, he set about the creation of a federation, and, against his judgement, the small colony of Nyasaland was included. His main wish for amalgamation, and later federation, was primarily so the complementary economic strengths of the Rhodesias could be put to best use. He felt that the colonies were missing out on the post-war economic boom.

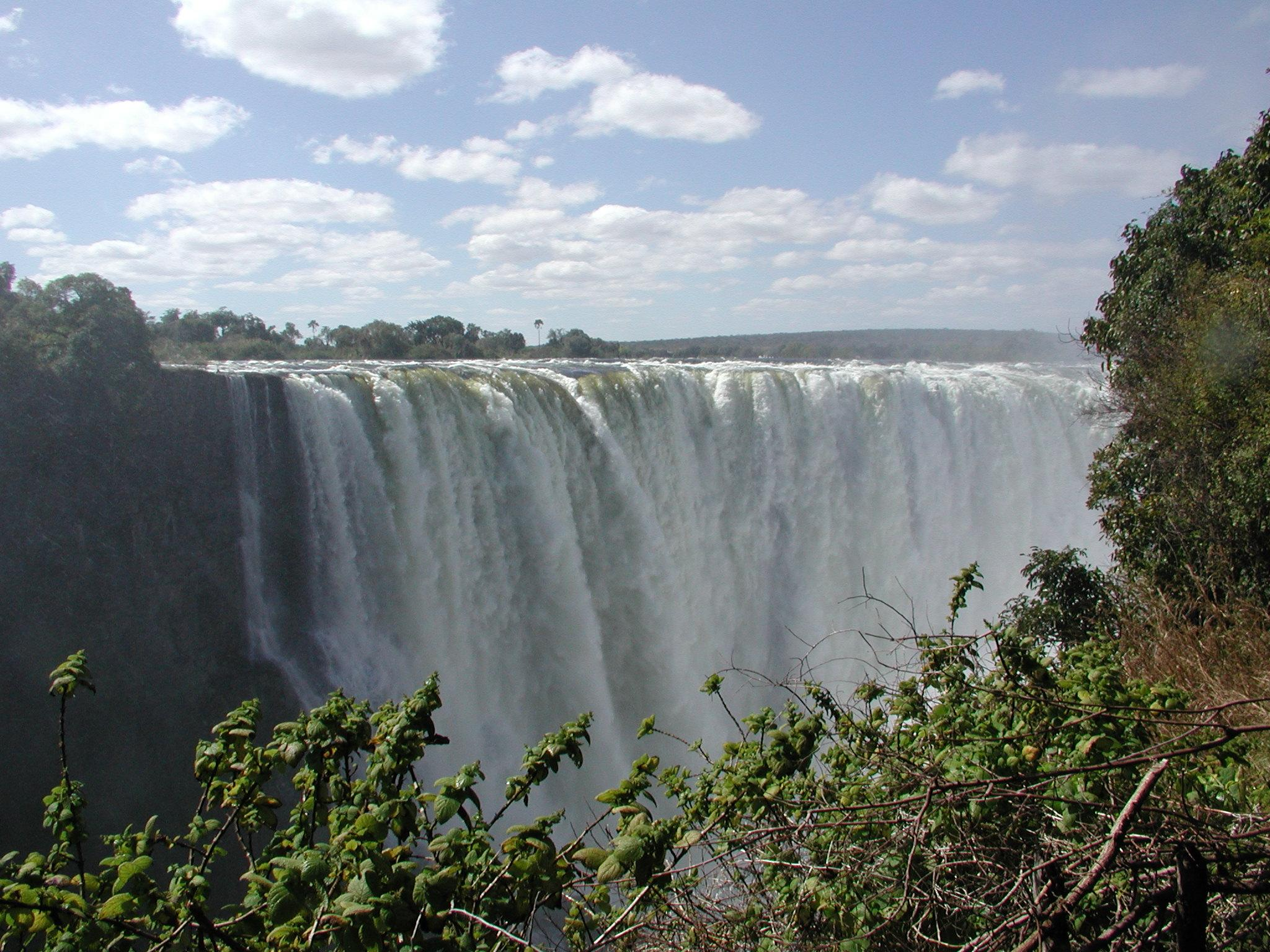
The Victoria Falls. Talks between the territorial governments to explore the idea of federation were held at the nearby Victoria Falls Hotel in 1963.

To this end, Welensky organised a conference in February 1949 to investigate the idea of a federation. Held at the Victoria Falls Hotel (a common venue for Rhodesian political conferences), representatives from the Northern and Southern Rhodesian Governments were present, but native Africans and the British Government were not. It was agreed that continued pushes for amalgamation would fail, since both the British and native Africans were opposed. Welensky suggested that the Constitution of Australia be used as a basis for the proposed federal constitution, and pushed the idea of 'partnership' between blacks and whites. However, he insisted that "for as long as I can see, in that partnership [the whites] will be senior partners".

Apart from organising the federation, Welensky won a significant political battle in Northern Rhodesia against the British South Africa Company (BSAC), which controlled mineral rights and the associated royalties throughout the territory. The company, and not the British Crown, had signed the treaties with African kings that surrendered mining rights, but the BSAC had stopped administering Northern Rhodesia in 1924. Welensky argued that the territory had a right to the royalties, and he petitioned the Governor to take action. After many talks, the BSAC relented and agreed to surrender mineral rights in 1986, and to pay 20% of its profits from these rights to the government until then.

In March 1952, the colonial and the British governments met in London to discuss federation. There, the idea for a federation was finalised and settled, although the colonial governments had, again, insisted on amalgamation. They were rebuffed by the left-leaning public servant (later Sir) Andrew Cohen, who, after much deliberation, brought the parties to an agreement. It was acknowledged by those at the meeting that, all too often, the racial policies of the Rhodesias were confused with the emerging apartheid of South Africa, and Welensky himself claimed to refute these ideas when being interviewed by a South African newspaper. He was paternalistic towards native Africans, but believed in the dictum of "equal rights for all civilised men" and gradual advancement.

Behind the scenes, Welensky and the Rhodesians had been courting the Conservatives, while the native Africans had been doing the same with Labour. A British general election was held in 1951 and the Conservatives gained power. Labour, mindful of the overwhelming opposition of Africans from both Northern Rhodesia and Nyasaland and of the Colonial Office mandate to oversee native interests, had been lukewarm at best to the idea of federation, and had been wholly opposed to amalgamation. After the election, the bipartisan approach to federation broke down and the British laws for its creation passed only with the support of the Conservatives, against opposition from both the Liberal and Labour Parties.

== Federation established ==
Welensky stood for the federal legislature in 1953 for the United Federal Party (UFP), created by himself and Southern Rhodesian prime minister Sir Godfrey Huggins. The party was successful in its first election, with twice the votes of the opposition Confederate Party. Welensky himself gained more than 80% of the vote in the federal constituency of Broken Hill and was immediately promoted to Minister for Transport.

The Flag of the Federation of Rhodesia and Nyasaland. On the shield, the rising sun represents Nyasaland, the lion Southern Rhodesia, and the black and white wavy lines Northern Rhodesia.

The first few years of the federation were characterised by a relatively peaceful political atmosphere and a booming economy. The government's coffers were kept full through revenue from Northern Rhodesia's copper mines, and overseas investment saw the rapid expansion of the cities of Salisbury, Bulawayo and Lusaka. High-standard tar roads replaced dirt tracks, and the railway system was expanded. Welensky credited the high rate of development to the astute management of the federal Minister of Finance, Donald MacIntyre.

The Southern Rhodesian Government, under the leadership of Garfield Todd, began removing restrictions imposed on native Africans. The civil service opened more positions to blacks, the title for male Africans was changed from 'AM' (African male) to "Mr", and diners and restaurants were allowed to be multiracial; Welensky, as Transport Minister, allowed for railway dining cars to be multiracial. However, when it came to liberalising alcohol restrictions on blacks, Welensky argued against doing so, stating that such an action would cause the UFP to lose the next election. After repeated failed attempts to secure Dominion status for the federation, the prime minister Godfrey Huggins opted not to stand again for his party's leadership at their September 1956 conference. Huggins resigned in October, and Welensky, the second-most senior figure in the federal arena, was chosen to replace him. Welensky took office on 1 November.

== Prime minister ==
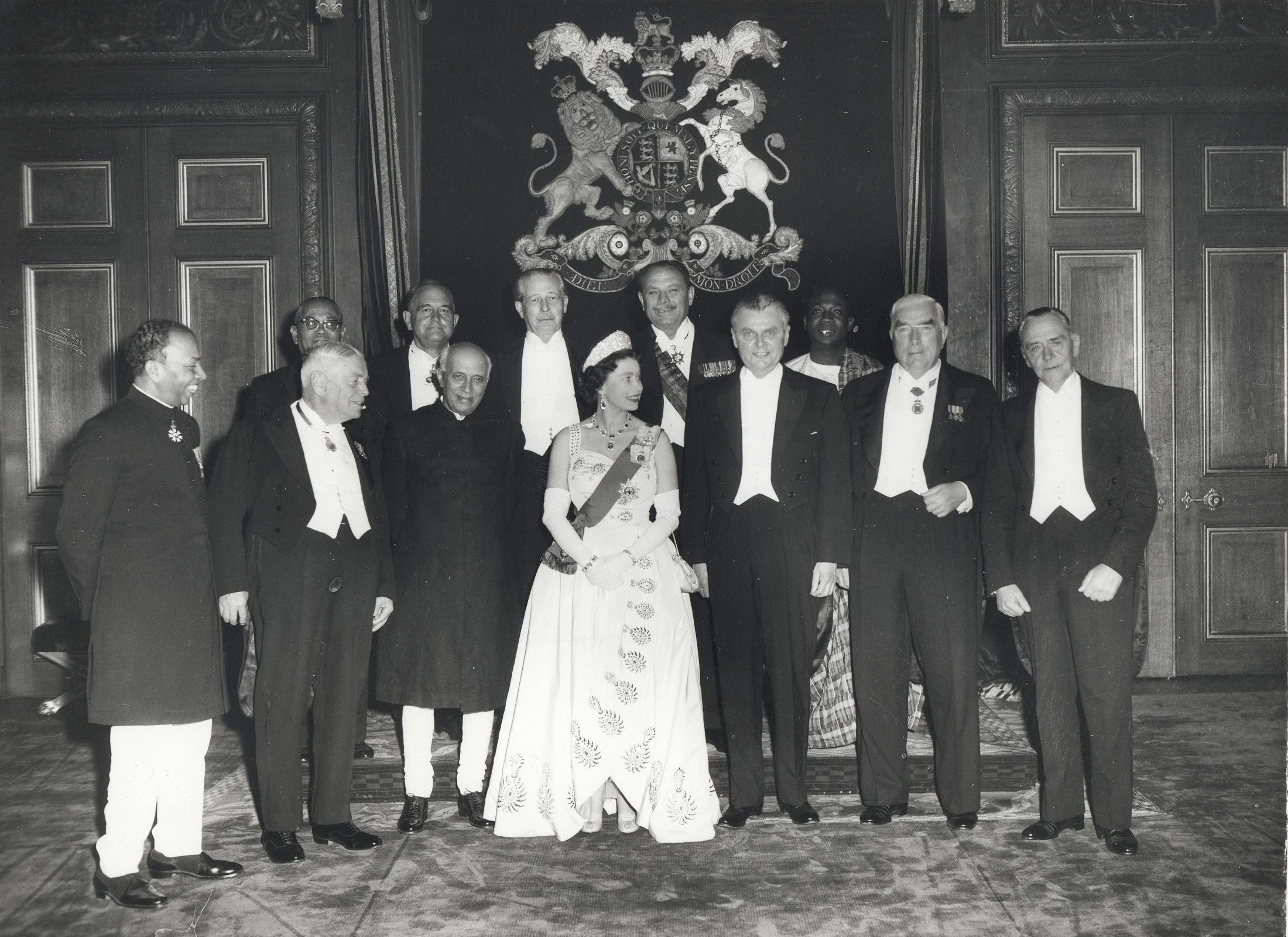
Roy Welensky (back row, second from left) at the 1960 Commonwealth Prime Ministers' Conference

On taking office, Welensky was forced to take sides in the Suez Crisis. The government of the United Kingdom received heavy international criticism for its actions, but Welensky's government, with those of Australia and New Zealand, nonetheless stood behind Britain. It was Welensky's first experience in international politics. In the aftermath of the Suez debacle, British colonial policy changed significantly, which would have adverse effects for the Federation. It marked the decline of a gradual approach to decolonisation, and a rapid speeding-up of the process. Politically, only three years after its founding, the federation began to decline.

International attitudes to the Federation were critical, particularly from the Afro-Asian bloc in the United Nations. At a time when most colonial powers were rushing their colonies towards independence, the Federation seemed to its opponents to be an unwelcome obstacle. In Britain, Labour grew more critical, and African nationalists in the federation itself became more vocal, dissatisfied with the liberalisation that was taking place, and demanding faster moves towards African advancement. The Governor of Northern Rhodesia, Sir Arthur Benson, wrote a secret letter to his superiors in Britain, highly critical of Welensky and the federation; this letter remained undiscovered until 1958, when Huggins revealed it to Welensky.

=== Nyasaland unrest ===
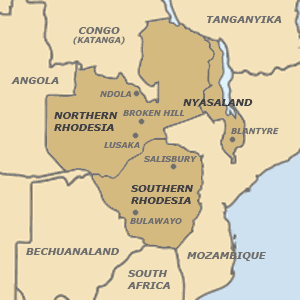
The three territories of the Federation of Rhodesia and Nyasaland

The Colonial Secretary Alan Lennox-Boyd visited the Federation in January 1957, while Welensky prepared to outline the difficulties regarding African advancement. Seeking to bring Africans into the established political processes, and hoping they would shun the recently formed African National Congress (ANC) parties, Welensky hit out at what he saw as the poor Colonial Office practice of making the situation "[consist] of two opposed policies, black rule and white rule. They naturally prefer to aim for black rule and hope they will experience this, which they regard as the apotheosis of Colonial Office policy".

The Nyasaland African Congress (NAC) was particularly vocal about increased African representation in the Nyasaland Legislative Council, demanding in September 1957 an African majority in the council. Nyasaland's inclusion in the Federation was never a goal of its proponents, it was there primarily because it was not economically viable by itself. Welensky did not understand or appreciate the party's goal of increased African representation or secession when it relied on the Federation for its well-being.

Hastings Banda, the leader of the Nyasaland nationalist cause, returned to the territory in 1958 and began organising opposition to the Federation. Having lived outside the territory for more than 25 years and having great difficulty remembering his native African language, he required the assistance of interpreters to communicate with the population, whom he stirred into a frenzy with his speeches. After the Governor and the Federal Government refused to give Africans a majority in the Legislative Council, he embarked on a speaking tour of the territory. In January 1959, he stated in a speech that he "put Salisbury [the capital] on fire ... I got Salisbury rocking, rocking, and got it awake out of its political sleep ...", after which his followers stoned passing cars and police officers.

The federal government met with the territorial governments to plan for a response should the violence get out of hand. Welensky did not rule out deploying federal troops if the situation deteriorated. Speaking to the defence chiefs in Salisbury, he said that "during the next three months we can expect some fairly serious trouble in Nyasaland ... It is my concern to ensure that this government is in a position to exercise its responsibilities if trouble comes".

A NAC meeting was held outside Blantyre on 25 January. It was alleged that the meeting discussed in detail a plan for the overthrow of the territorial government and the massacre of the territory's whites and any blacks who collaborated with them (although a subsequent Royal Commission found there was insufficient evidence to make such a claim). Welensky obtained the meeting's proceedings in early February and decided to act, calling a meeting of the federal and territorial governments. Federal troops were deployed to Nyasaland on 21 February, the Governor of Nyasaland proclaimed a state of emergency on 3 March and the nationalist leaders were arrested and flown to jails in Southern Rhodesia. In the subsequent fortnight, riots broke out and troops used force to end the violence. Almost 50 people died in the unrest.

The main militant African nationalist parties in each territory were banned by the federal and territorial governments, but all reorganised under new names only months later. The Southern Rhodesian ANC became the National Democratic Party (later ZAPU), the Northern Rhodesian ANC became the Zambian African National Congress, and the Nyasaland ANC became the Malawi Congress Party. The media's use of the term 'police state' to describe the response to the violence outraged the Liberals, the Church of Scotland and leftist Conservatives, and particularly the Labour Party, in Britain. John Stonehouse, a Labour MP, had been deported prior to the declaration of the state of emergency, adding to the tension. A Royal Commission was announced to investigate the violence. Welensky was indignant when asked to contribute to the Royal Commission, and the Labour Party boycotted it.

=== Commissions and Macmillan ===
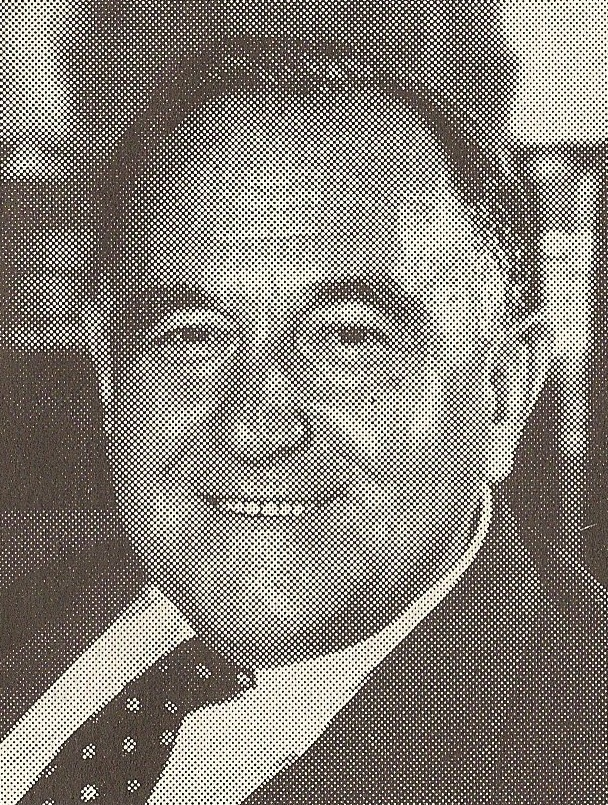
Welensky in 1960

In addition to the Royal Commission that investigated the Nyasaland violence (now known as the Devlin Report), the British Government organised a second one, known as the Monckton Report, to advise on the future of the federation. Released in October 1960, the report advocated sweeping changes to be made to the federal structure, including African majorities in the Nyasaland and Northern Rhodesian legislatures. Welensky was outraged when the report was published, calling it the "death knell of federation" and rejecting it out of hand. African nationalist opinion was just as opposed, but on different grounds. All nationalists wanted an end to federation, and independence for the territories as black-majority-ruled states. Welensky was opposed to any talk of secession, and the Monckton Report suggested it in writing when it stated that the territories should have the option after five years under a new federal constitution.

Early 1960 saw British prime minister Harold Macmillan journey to the Federation for the first and last time. There, he held talks in person with Welensky and the territorial governments, and he took the opportunity to gauge African opinion towards the Federation. Macmillan also wished to talk to the jailed African leaders, but was met with a rebuff from Welensky. Hastings Banda discussed the probability of his release from prison with the British Government through Labour MP Dingle Foot. Welensky had Banda's cell wired for sound and was frustrated with what he saw as the British government's "betrayal, duplicity, appeasement, cowardice and loss of nerve" when dealing with the African nationalists and the federation. Macmillan travelled on to South Africa, where he made his 'Wind of Change' speech to the South African Parliament, raising the attention of South African Prime Minister Dr Hendrik Verwoerd. Welensky was informed that Banda would be released so that he could join in discussions with the British Government over the future of the Federation. Losing patience with the British, Welensky took a harder line against them: "I've tried all along to behave in a reasonable and responsible manner. Now I'm seriously wondering whether restraint has been the right policy."

=== New constitutions ===
After Banda was released from prison against the wishes of Welensky, Banda travelled to the United Kingdom, where he took part in the Nyasaland constitutional talks. The outcome was a constitution which, through a voting system that was as complex as that of the Federation itself, amounted to black majority rule for the territory. Bitter and angry at what he saw as British ignorance to the situation, Welensky did not comprehend how the British were willing to deal with Banda. In Welensky's words, since his release from prison, "[Banda] was careful to appeal for calm and to condemn violence", but Welensky was averse to Banda's demands for black majority rule and believed that granting it to the territory would mean the end of the Federation.

In Northern and Southern Rhodesia new constitutions were also enacted. The Southern Rhodesian constitution was very cautious and prolonged white rule. It had 50 A-roll seats with high voting qualifications (essentially for whites), and 15 B-roll seats with lower qualifications (for blacks). A system of 'cross voting' meant that results in A-roll seats would be affected by the B-roll vote, and vice versa. All constitutions were signed by the UFP and the African nationalist party in each territory. However, there were immediate repercussions; Ian Smith, chief whip for the UFP in the federal assembly, resigned in protest at the new Southern Rhodesian constitution, calling it "racialist", while the nationalist National Democratic Party withdrew support for the constitution having earlier signed it.

Eventually, Welensky was comfortable with an African majority in Nyasaland and for the province to secede, seeking to preserve only a union of the two Rhodesias but, as a Northern Rhodesian, he did not accept black majority rule for the territory and a battle arose with the British Government over its new constitution throughout 1961–62. In discussions with Smith regarding the concept of Northern Rhodesia under African rule, Welensky stated: "I am not prepared to hand power to the blacks. Personally I could not live in a country where they were in control."

Welensky considered a federal unilateral declaration of independence when the new Northern Rhodesian constitution appeared likely to grant an African majority in its parliament. Determined at one point to prevent changes, Welensky was convinced that, if he refused, the British would use military force to remove his government. Believing that preparations were being made for an invasion from Kenya, he discussed the Federation's ability to repel an attack with his defence chiefs and plans were set in motion. In the end, the idea of a British invasion was one of many options considered, and it did not make it past cabinet discussion.

=== Congo, Katanga and Tshombe ===
Welensky once told a journalist that he was considering incorporating the Belgian Congo's Katanga Province into the Federation. After the Belgian Congo gained independence in 1960 as the Republic of the Congo, it collapsed into a state of anarchy within a fortnight. The large Belgian population of the Congo fled from the violence into neighbouring states, including the Federation. Welensky dispatched the Royal Rhodesian Air Force (RRAF) to assist in their evacuation, but was prevented by the British government from entering the Congo itself. Refugees fled by foot to Ndola in Northern Rhodesia, where RRAF planes picked them up and flew them to camps in Salisbury. More than 6,000 people were evacuated by the RRAF.

The leader of Katanga, Moise Tshombe, requested British and Rhodesian forces to enter the country to restore order. Welensky was sympathetic to the situation but unable to act; the British government, which had ultimate jurisdiction over the Federation, disallowed him from mobilising the armed forces. Tshombe declared Katanga unilaterally independent on 11 July 1960, one day after requesting British and Rhodesian assistance. Welensky pleaded with Macmillan to deploy the Rhodesian forces, but Macmillan rebuffed him, telling Welensky that their hopes were pinned on the United Nations being able to restore order and hoping for a wholly neutral or anti-communist Congo. Welensky decided to support Tshombe, feeling that Katanga could provide a buffer between the Federation of Rhodesia and Nyasaland and Prime Minister Patrice Lumumba of the Congolese government. Welensky feared Lumumba was supporting black nationalists and communists in the Federation. He argued that "the security of Southern Africa from Communism requires that Katanga be recognised de facto by as many countries as possible. Such recognition would strengthen Tshombe's hand enormously."

The Federation provided a key outlet for Tshombe to acquire mercenaries, smuggle weapons and sell Katanga's minerals for cash. When the United Nations requested permission to post observers at the Katangese–Rhodesian border to halt the smuggling, Welensky refused to assent. Welensky heavily criticised UN peacekeeping operations in the Congo and the United Kingdom's response to the crisis. He used this as a means to mobilize white Rhodesian support for his government as it came under increasing pressure from the white supremacist Rhodesian Front (RF) party for failing to contain black nationalism within the Federation. Welensky stayed in regular communication with Tshombe, although they did not meet in person until late September 1961.

In September, United Nations troops launched Operation Morthor, bringing them into conflict with Katangese forces. Though Welensky had abided by previous instructions from Macmillan to refrain from troop deployments, the British High Commissioner gave him permission this time, and Welensky moved ground troops and most of the RRAF to the frontier. United Nations Secretary General Dag Hammarskjöld, hoping to negotiate a solution to Katanga's secession, agreed to meet Tshombe at Ndola. However, Hammarskjöld's plane crashed under unclear circumstances close to Ndola in November 1961, and he was killed. Welensky was subsequently blamed for the accident throughout the communist and Afro-Asian world, becoming a hated figure and a lingering symbol of colonialism. Other UN officials reached a ceasefire agreement with Tshombe in Ndola, and Macmillan thanked Welensky for facilitating the meeting.

The British government ultimately decided to support the concept of a unified Congo and rallied against Katanga's secession. Welensky thought the decision was cynical and displayed weakness in the British Empire. Welensky's attitude towards Katanga and the Congo would strain relations between the federation and the British until its dissolution. When UN troops initiated military action against Katanga in December 1962, Tshombe fled to Salisbury and met with Welensky, vowing to continue the secession. Nevertheless, the Katangese government surrendered in January 1963.

=== Territorial and federal elections ===
With new constitutions in place for the territories, elections were held throughout 1961–62, and Welensky's UFP was beaten in each one. In Nyasaland, the African nationalist Malawi Congress Party won a huge majority, and Banda set about lobbying the British Government for the break-up of the Federation and the independence of Nyasaland as Malawi. In Northern Rhodesia, neither the UFP nor the two African nationalist parties held a majority, but the African nationalists united to push for independence. Welensky hoped to get a display of confidence in the Federation, so he dissolved parliament in mid-1962 and held elections. While his party won a huge victory, it did so because it was completely unopposed. Neither the recently formed RF nor the African nationalist parties bothered to contest it.

In Southern Rhodesia, the UFP lost the hold that it and its successor parties had for decades in the October election. Ian Smith, a former federal member of the UFP, had united with Winston Field of the Dominion Party to form the Rhodesian Front, a conservative party that was opposed to a fast rate of African political advancement and the 1961 constitution, and in support of Southern Rhodesian independence. The RF won 55% of the vote and 35 A-roll seats, while the UFP won 44% of the vote, 15 A-roll seats and 14 B-roll seats. Welensky now had parties in power in all three territorial legislatures that were opposed to the Federation and advocating independence for their respective territories.

=== Dissolution ===
Since Nyasaland and Northern Rhodesia had been promised independence by Britain under 'one man, one vote' constitutions, the Federation was essentially dead. Southern Rhodesia, still governed by its white minority, was subject to attacks in the United Nations general assembly which regarded its constitution as unsatisfactory. It demanded 'one man, one vote' elections, stating that this was the only "realistic answer to the powerful and irresistible urge of the indigenous people for freedom and equality".

Accepting the end of the Federation, Welensky set about ensuring that the assets of the federal government were transferred to Southern Rhodesia, making this a condition of him attending dissolution talks at Victoria Falls. Welensky refused to dine with the British delegates, on the grounds of "not choking on his food", but ensured that the talks went smoothly. The federation was legally dissolved on 31 December 1963.

== Rhodesian UDI ==
Upon the collapse of the Federation, Welensky moved to Salisbury, Rhodesia (renamed from Southern Rhodesia after Northern Rhodesia gained independence as Zambia). After a short break, he was invited to lead the UFP in Rhodesia, which had recently renamed itself the Rhodesia Party. As the Rhodesian Front pushed for independence for the territory and a new constitution, the Rhodesia Party advocated the same, but with a focus on stemming white emigration and rebuilding the economy (all three territories had slipped into recession after the end of the federation).

By the resignation of the RF member for the Salisbury constituency of Arundel, Welensky was given a chance to re-enter the political arena. Clifford Dupont, Deputy Prime Minister, resigned his constituency in Charter to oppose Welensky. Welensky knew that if the RF won the by-elections it would appear as a mandate for unilateral independence; the campaign, for only two seats, was intense. At public meetings, Welensky was heckled by opponents to ironic cries of 'Communist', 'traitor' and 'coward'. Sharing a television platform with Smith on 3 September, Welensky talked of the economic and political dangers of a UDI, but nonetheless wished Smith luck when he departed for independence talks in London. Welensky had much more antipathy for the British Government than for his RF opponents, and was disgusted at their treatment of the Rhodesians during constitutional talks:

I want to remind you that I am no friend of the present Government in Rhodesia: I have opposed their policies and can be considered a political opponent. But I was as horrified as any other Rhodesian at this cavalier treatment of a country which has, since its creation, staunchly supported, in every possible way, Britain and the Commonwealth.

On 1 October, Welensky was soundly defeated by his RF opponent, with 633 votes to Dupont's 1,079. In December, he resigned the leadership of his party. When the RF declared unilateral independence on 11 November 1965, Welensky was upset at the constitutional break with Britain. He believed that Rhodesia was entitled to her independence, and disagreed with the British government's demand for 'no independence before majority rule', but was opposed to illegal action.

== Later life and death ==
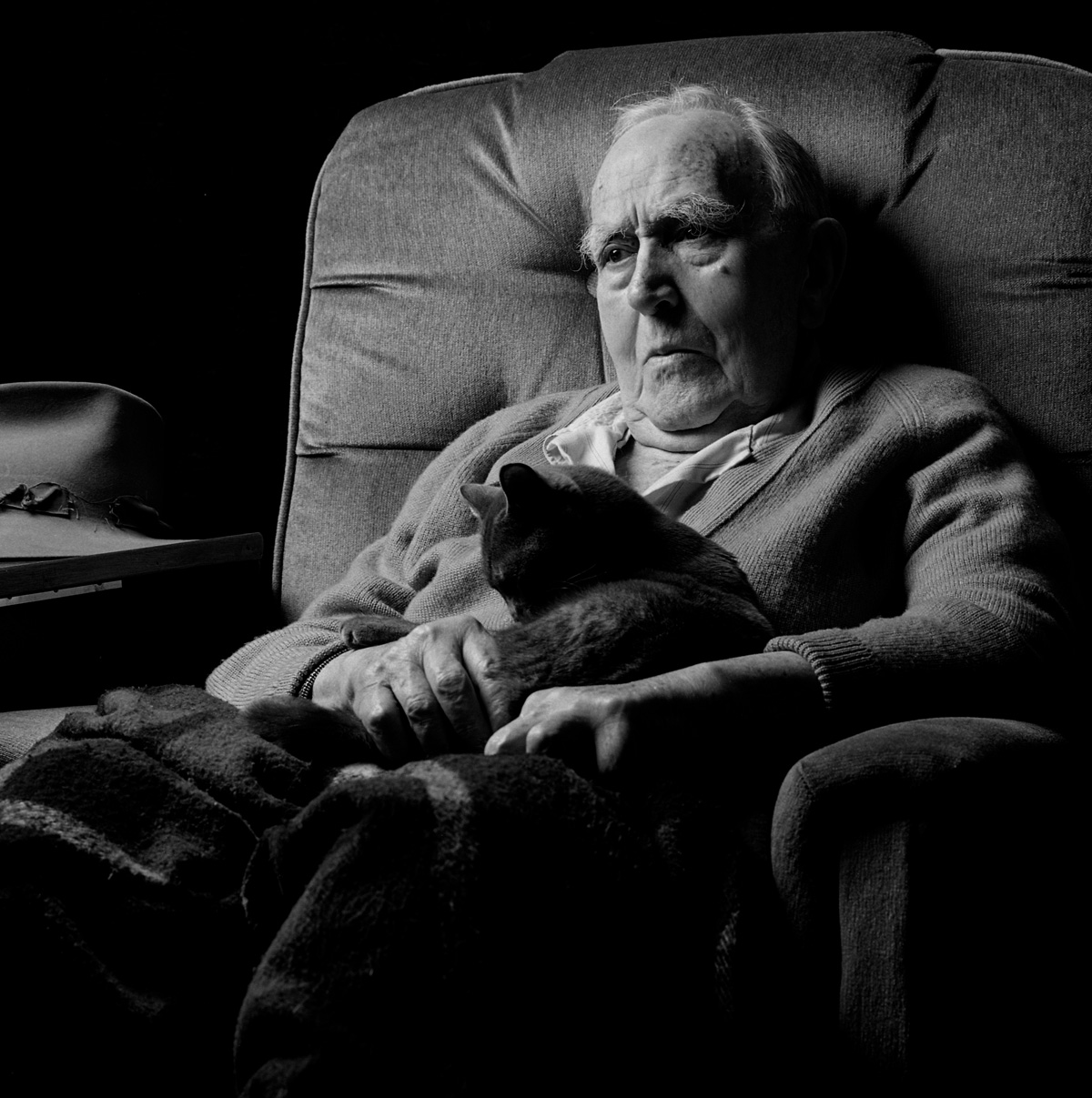
Welensky in 1989

Welensky continued living in Rhodesia until Robert Mugabe gained power and the country became Zimbabwe in 1980.

While in London in 1971, and by then a widower, Welensky met Miriam Valerie Scott. The couple were married, and went on to have two daughters. They relocated to Blandford Forum, Dorset, in 1981, where he died on 5 December 1991.

== Honours ==
| Member of The Most Honourable Privy Council | NY 1960 |
| Knight Commander of the Order of St Michael and St George (KCMG) | NY 1959 |
| Companion of the Order of St Michael and St George (CMG) | NY 1946 |
| Knight Bachelor (Kt) | Coronation 1953 |
| Queen Elizabeth II Coronation Medal | Coronation 1953 |

== Notes ==
Assembly seats
| New constituency | Member of the Legislative Council for Broken Hill; 1941 – 1954 | Succeeded by John Roberts |
Rhodesia and Nyasaland Federal Assembly
| New constituency | Member of Federal Parliament for Broken Hill; 1953 – 1963 | Federation dissolved |
Political offices
| New title | Minister of Transport and Development; 1953 | Succeeded by Himself as Minister of Transport |
| Preceded by Himself as Minister of Transport and Development | Minister of Transport; 1953 – 1954 | Succeeded by Himself as Minister of Transport and Communications |
| New title | Minister of Communications; 1953 – 1954 | Succeeded by Himself as Minister of Transport and Communications |
| Preceded by Himself | Minister of Transport and Communications; 1954 – 1956 | Succeeded by William Hives Eastwood as Minister of Transport and Works |
| New title | Minister of Posts; 1954 – 1956 | Succeeded by Donald MacIntyre |
| Preceded by Sir Godfrey Huggins | Prime Minister of the Federation of Rhodesia and Nyasaland; 1956 – 1963 | Federation dissolved |
| Preceded by Sir Godfrey Huggins | Minister of External Affairs; 1956 – 1963 | Federation dissolved |
| Preceded by Sir Godfrey Huggins | Minister of Defence; 1956 – 1959 | Succeeded by Sir Malcolm Barrow |
Party political offices
| Preceded by Sir Godfrey Huggins | Leader of the Federal Party; 1956 – 1957 | Party merged into United Federal Party |
| New political party | Leader of the United Federal Party/Federal Party; 1957 – 1963 | Federation dissolved |
