= Rhodesia Labour Party =

Political party in Southern Rhodesia

The Rhodesia Labour Party was a political party which existed in Southern Rhodesia from 1923 until the 1950s. Originally formed on the model of the British Labour Party from trade unions and being especially dominated by railway workers, it formed the main opposition party from 1934 to 1946. The party suffered a catastrophic split during the Second World War and lost all its seats, and a further split over the attitude to the Federation of Rhodesia and Nyasaland ended its involvement in Rhodesian politics.

== Formation ==
Labour interests were allied to the Responsible Government Association in seeking self-government for the colony. At the 1920 election to the Legislative Council, two of the Responsible Government Association candidates associated with Labour while three Labour candidates and one Independent Labour stood separately. Following the successful referendum in 1922 supporting self-government, Labour supporters made definite attempts to form a party. As negotiations over a constitution progressed, there were hopes that Labour might be the strongest party in the country, but the constitutional provisions for boundaries were reckoned to be unhelpful.

The party was formally established later that year. The largest contribution to the party was made by the Rhodesian Railway Workers' Union. When the Responsible Government Party became the Rhodesia Party in December 1923, it resolved that negotiations with the Labour Party should be entered into by 15 January 1924, and the broad outlines of an agreement were reached prior to the first general election. However, the Rhodesia Labour Party's insistence that it should be able to fight eight out of the thirty seats was regarded as unacceptable by the Rhodesia Party which was prepared to offer only five (with some members totally opposed to any form of deal), and negotiations broke down.

== First election ==
In the event, the two parties opposed each other at the 1924 election and the Rhodesia Labour Party was unable to win any seats. Ten out of the fifteen candidates were associated with the Railway Workers' Union. The party's line at the election was reported as being "extreme anti-capitalist and anti-Government" by The Times correspondent, and it obtained substantial votes only in Bulawayo and Umtali where the railways had substantial numbers of employees.

== Growth ==
In the 1928 elections, three out of the party's eight candidates were successful, two in Bulawayo divisions and the third in Umtali South. In July 1929, N. H. Wilson, the Chairman of the Progressive Party proposed an alignment of that party with the Country Party (representing dissident farmers in the Rhodesian Agricultural Union) and the Rhodesia Labour Party; after consideration, the party decided in September 1929 to remain independent.

The poor economic conditions associated with the Great Depression saw the party rise in popularity. Throughout the elections of the 1930s, the RLP would progressively increase its vote percentage and Assembly seats running on an anti-capitalist and anti-government platform. After the 1934 election (when the government had merged with the main opposition party), the Rhodesia Labour Party took over as the opposition. From 1939, it was the only opposition party represented in the Assembly.

== Second World War divisions ==
At the outbreak of war, Prime Minister Godfrey Huggins offered to appoint the leader of the party, Harry Davies, to government as part of an all party administration. Davies accepted without consulting the National Executive Committee and was appointed Minister of Internal Affairs on 3 October 1939. The NEC were in fact opposed, although they decided not to raise objections. In 1940, Huggins offered a formal coalition to the party. The NEC rejected this approach, whereupon Davies, John Keller and Thomas Kimble resigned from the party and formed a new party, which they named "The Labour Party". Keller was also appointed to the government as Minister without Portfolio. The breakaway was more strongly supported in Bulawayo and Midlands, with Salisbury and Umtali remaining loyal.

In February 1942, a motion of no confidence in the Huggins government was defeated but with four members of the United Party breaking the whip to support it. Two of them, Edgar Vernall and Frank Thompson, then joined the RLP. Despite the party maneuvring, hopes among Labour supporters were high that some form of reunification could be arrived at after the war. Moves toward reunification had a fortuitous boost when Davies and Keller attended a party congress of "The Labour Party" in October 1943, as Huggins had declared that this was contrary to the spirit of coalition and dismissed them from the government on 12 October. "The Labour Party" then went into opposition.

== Reunification ==
Reunification terms were actually agreed over the winter with the new party called the Southern Rhodesian Labour Party. An inaugural congress was held on 9 January 1944, but Harry Davies walked out halfway through, denouncing the congress as unrepresentative because his supporters were outnumbered by about four to one among delegates. A dispute then began over the affiliation of the "African Headquarters Branch", to which "The Labour Party" were opposed. They pointed to the fact that the affiliation had been agreed despite not complying with regulations whereas a non-compliant branch which supported Davies was refused affiliation.

Eventually on 22 September 1944 Davies and Keller resigned from the Southern Rhodesian Labour Party and reformed "The Labour Party" which excluded all Africans from membership. Unification was still strongly desired and following the end of the war, negotiations were begun at Gwelo. These negotiations failed, resulting in the secession of three further members to "The Labour Party"; the breakaway group then re-established the Rhodesia Labour Party on pre-war lines.

== Post-war influence ==
All the infighting caused a dramatic loss of support for both factions in the 1946 general election at which there were 23 candidates from the Rhodesia Labour Party and 11 from the Southern Rhodesia Labour Party. The parties won three and two seats respectively although very few of them were convincing victories and observers regarded them as being won on a personal vote. The SRLP gave general support to Huggins' United Party government, which gave it a bare overall majority in the Assembly.

By the 1948 election the SRLP had ceased political action with one of its members joining the United Party and another the Rhodesia Labour Party, although the party organisation continued to exist. However, only one member (Keller) kept his seat (a second seat was won back in a byelection in October 1949). Keller resigned from the party in the early 1950s to sit as an Independent Labour.

== Federation ==
The party leader, William Eastwood, backed the creation of the Federation of Rhodesia and Nyasaland in 1952. However, the party's decision to campaign for election to the Federal Parliament led to Eastwood and four members of the Executive resigning, as they felt that the party would divide the vote of those opposed to racial segregation (the party took the decision at the same time as rejecting a move to allow African members). These resignations made it impossible for the party to contest the Federal elections in December 1953 or the 1954 general election in Southern Rhodesia.
