= Legislative Assembly of Rhodesia =

1924–1970 legislature of Southern Rhodesia then Rhodesia

Type
- Type: Unicameral

History
- Founded: 30 May 1924
- Disbanded: 10 April 1970
- Preceded by: Legislative Council
- Succeeded by: Parliament of Rhodesia

Leadership
- Monarch: George V (1923–1936); Edward VIII (1936); George VI (1936–1952); Elizabeth II (1952–1970)
- President: Clifford Dupont (1970) (RF)
- Governor: Sir John Chancellor (first); Sir Humphrey Gibbs (last)
- Officer Administrating the Government: Clifford Dupont (1965–1970) (RF)
- Speaker: Lionel Cripps (first); Rubidge Stumbles (last)
- Seats: 30 1924–1962; 65 1962–1970

Elections
- Voting system: First-past-the-post with limited suffrage
- Last election: 1965

Meeting place
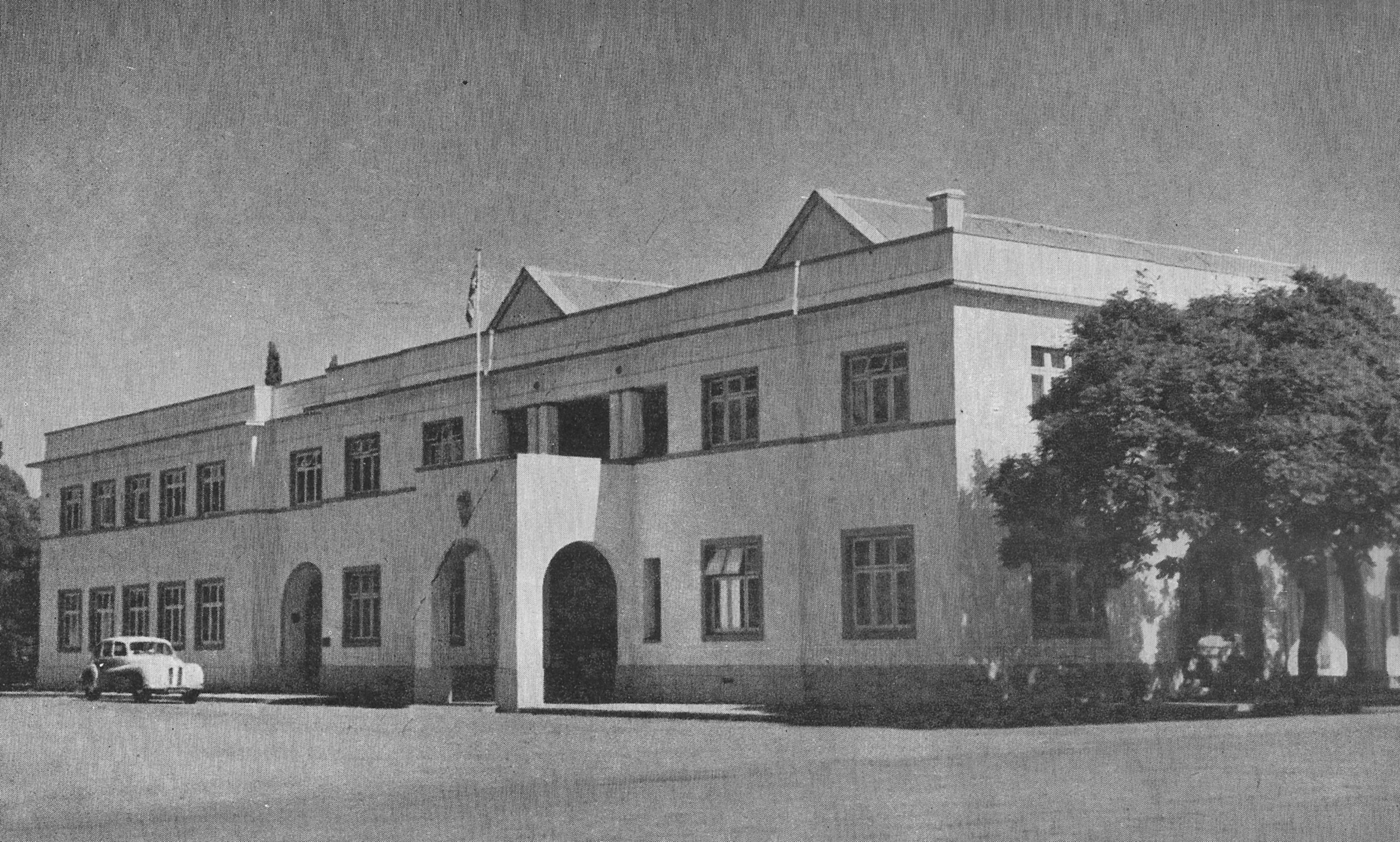
- Legislative Assembly building, Salisbury

The Legislative Assembly of Rhodesia was the legislature of Southern Rhodesia and then Rhodesia from 1924 to 1970.

== Background ==
In 1898, the Southern Rhodesian Legislative Council, Southern Rhodesia's first elected representative body, was founded. Much of the decisions regarding the administration of Southern Rhodesia was made by the British South Africa Company (BSAC). When BSAC rule was terminated in 1923 and Responsible Government achieved, the Legislative Council was replaced by the Legislative Assembly. Under the Constitution, there was provision for the establishment of an upper house to be known as the Legislative Council, but none was ever established, meaning that the Legislative Assembly remained a unicameral legislature.

== Franchise ==
Modelled after the British House of Commons, the Assembly had limitations placed on its powers of legislation, as the British Crown reserved the right to block legislation and allowed only legislation on internal matters to be discussed in the parliament.

The Letters Patent granting the colony the right to self-government in 1923 made no change to the pre-existing franchise. The law provided that voters must have been resident in Southern Rhodesia for at least six months, and have the ability to complete the claim form for the electoral register in their own handwriting if the registrar required, and to write from dictation 50 words in the English language. In addition, voters had to meet one of three criteria for their financial means: either occupy property worth £150 in their Electoral District, or own a registered mining claim within the colony (for which residence was not required), or receive annual salary of £100 in the colony.

== Electoral procedure ==
No change was made to the basic electoral procedure, which continued to be the first past the post system, cast by means of the secret ballot.

== Electoral districts ==
The Letters Patent created a Legislative Assembly with 30 members, and for simplicity the 15 electoral districts set the previous year for the Legislative Council were used for the new assembly, but with each district returning two members. Voters were therefore entitled to two votes. Until 1961 there were technically no restrictions on the ability for native Africans to vote, but a high property qualification ensured that few were entitled to vote. This was altered in 1958, when a special voters' roll was created for Africans, although Africans were limited to voting for 15 Assembly members while Europeans were entitled to elect 50 members.

== Election results ==
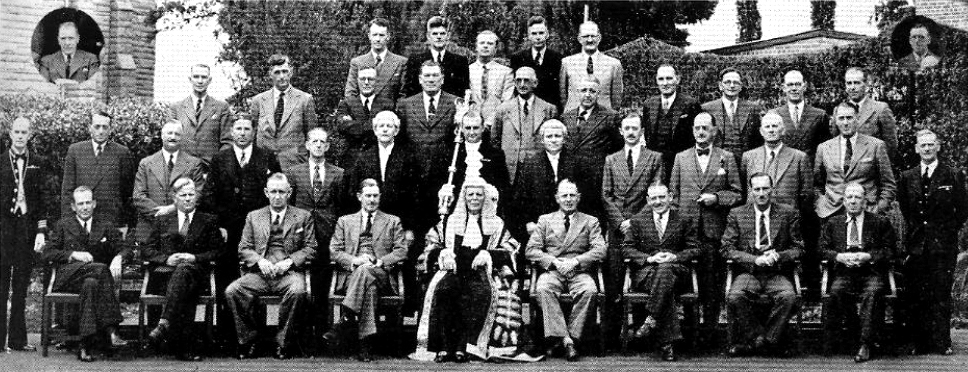
Official photograph of the seventh Southern Rhodesian Legislative Assembly in 1948.

The following table reflects only those members elected from general roll electoral divisions.

Term	Election	Party	Seats Won
1st	29 April 1924		
1st	29 April 1924	Rhodesian Party	26
1st	29 April 1924	Independent	4
2nd	19 September 1928		
2nd	19 September 1928	Rhodesian Party	22
2nd	19 September 1928	Progressive Party	4
2nd	19 September 1928	Labour Party	3
2nd	19 September 1928	Independent	1
3rd	6 September 1933		
3rd	6 September 1933	Reform Party	16
3rd	6 September 1933	Rhodesian Party	9
3rd	6 September 1933	Labour Party	5
4th	7 November 1934		
4th	7 November 1934	United Party	24
4th	7 November 1934	Labour Party	5
4th	7 November 1934	Reform Party	1
5th	14 April 1939		
5th	14 April 1939	United Party	23
5th	14 April 1939	Labour Party	7
6th	25 April 1946		
6th	25 April 1946	United Party	13
6th	25 April 1946	Liberal Party	12
6th	25 April 1946	Labour Party	3
6th	25 April 1946	Southern Rhodesia Labour Party	2
7th	15 September 1948		
7th	15 September 1948	United Party	24
7th	15 September 1948	Liberal Party	5
7th	15 September 1948	Labour Party	1
8th	27 January 1954		
8th	27 January 1954	United Rhodesia Party	26
8th	27 January 1954	Independent	2
8th	27 January 1954	Independent Labour	1
8th	27 January 1954	Independent Rhodesia Party	1
9th	5 June 1958		
9th	5 June 1958	United Federal Party	17
9th	5 June 1958	Dominion Party	13
10th	14 December 1962		
10th	14 December 1962	Rhodesian Front	35
10th	14 December 1962	United Federal Party	29
10th	14 December 1962	Independent	1
11th	7 May 1965		
11th	7 May 1965	Rhodesian Front	50
11th	7 May 1965	United People's Party	10
11th	7 May 1965	Independent	5
