= United Rhodesia Party =

Southern Rhodesian political party

The United Rhodesia Party (URP) was a white-run political party in Southern Rhodesia. It was informally known as the United Party.

The party first came to power in 1933 under Prime Minister Godfrey Huggins, who served until 1953. At this time, it was considered a conservative party.

In November 1957, the URP merged with the Federal Party to form the United Federal Party (UFP) under Prime Minister Garfield Todd. Following significant intraparty political maneuvering in early 1958, however, Todd broke away again to revive the party in a more liberal form, which ran in the 1958 Southern Rhodesian general election but failed to gain any seats.

This revived URP, which stood to the left of the more centrist UFP, once again merged with the latter in 1958 following Todd's defeat in the Territorial elections and the victory of the UFP, led at the time by Sir Edgar Whitehead.
