= United Federal Party =

- Founded: 1957
- Dissolved: 1963
- Merger of: Federal Party; United Rhodesia Party
- Merged into: Centre Party
- Succeeded by: National Progressive Party; Nyasaland Constitutional Party; Rhodesia National Party
- Headquarters: Salisbury

The United Federal Party (UFP) was a political party in the Federation of Rhodesia and Nyasaland.

== History ==
The UFP was formed in November 1957 by a merger of the Federal Party, which had operated at the federal level, and the Southern Rhodesian United Rhodesia Party. However, after conservative elements gained control of the party, the liberal faction led by Garfield Todd broke away to re-establish the United Rhodesia Party.

In the 1958 general election in Southern Rhodesia the UFP won 17 of the 30 seats, despite receiving fewer votes than the Dominion Party, whilst the URP failed to win a seat. In the federal election in November 1958, the UFP won 46 of the 59 seats.

General elections in Northern Rhodesia in March 1959 saw the UFP win 13 of the 20 elected seats. In the August 1961 elections in Nyasaland the Malawi Congress Party won 22 seats (including two upper roll seats) and the UFP five (all from the upper roll).

The next federal elections in March 1962 were boycotted by all other parties, allowing the UFP to win 54 of the 57 seats. However, that was the end of the UFP's success. In the Northern Rhodesian general elections in September the UFP won the most seats, but the Northern Rhodesian African National Congress, which held the balance of power, went back on a secret pact its leader Harry Nkumbula had made with the UFP and allowed the United National Independence Party to form the government. General elections in Southern Rhodesia in December 1962 saw the UFP defeated by the new Rhodesian Front; the UFP winning 29 seats to the Front's 35.

In April 1963 the party was split into four; the federal branch was rebranded as the Federal Party and continued to be led by Roy Welensky, whilst the territorial branches became the National Progressive Party in Northern Rhodesia, the Nyasaland Constitutional Party in Nyasaland and the Rhodesia National Party in Southern Rhodesia, where it was led by Edgar Whitehead. The federation was dissolved at the end of 1963.

== Election results ==
=== Federal elections ===
Election	Leader	Seats	+/–	Position	Status
1958	Roy Welensky	46 / 59	New	1st	Majority government
1962	Roy Welensky	54 / 57	▲8	1st	Majority government

=== Northern Rhodesia elections ===
Election	Leader	Seats	+/–	Position	Status
1959	Roy Welensky	13 / 22	New	1st	Majority government
1962	Roy Welensky	15 / 45	▲2	1st	Opposition

=== Southern Rhodesia elections ===
Election	Leader	Seats	+/–	Position	Status
1958	Edgar Whitehead	17 / 30	New	1st	Majority government
1962	Edgar Whitehead	29 / 65	▲12	▼2nd	Opposition

=== Nyasaland elections ===
Election	Leader	Seats	+/–	Position	Status
1961	Michael Hill Blackwood	5 / 28	New	2nd	Opposition
