= Hatcliffe (constituency) =

Constituency of the Parliament of Zimbabwe

- National Assembly constituency for the Parliament of Zimbabwe
- District: Harare
- Province: Harare
- Electorate: 35,326 (2023)

Current constituency
- Number of members: 1
- Party: Citizens Coalition For Change
- Member: Agency Gumbo
- Created from: Harare North

Hatcliffe is a constituency represented in the National Assembly of the Parliament of Zimbabwe, located in the northern suburbs of Harare. The current MP since the 2023 election is Agency Gumbo of the Citizens Coalition for Change.

== History ==
An older constituency, Salisbury North, (Note: Harare was called Salisbury until 1982.) existed in the Parliament of Rhodesia between 1924 and 1979. The last MP for Harare North following the 2018 general election was Rusty Markham of the Movement for Democratic Change Alliance.

For the 2023 general election, the constituency was renamed Hatcliffe from Harare North.

== Members ==
Election	Name	Party
Salisbury North
1924	Percival Fynn	Rhodesia Party
1924	Godfrey Huggins	Rhodesia Party
1928	Percival Fynn	Rhodesia Party
1928	Godfrey Huggins	Rhodesia Party
1933	Percival Fynn	Rhodesia Party
1933	Godfrey Huggins	Reform
1934	Percival Fynn	United
1934	Vernon Arthur Lewis	United
1936 (Note: By-election to replace Vernon Arthur Lewis, who resigned on 31 July 1936.)	Harry Bertin	United
1939	Godfrey Huggins	United
1946	Godfrey Huggins	United
1948	Godfrey Huggins	United
1954	Hardwicke Holderness	United
1958	Edgar Whitehead	United Federal
1962	Edgar Whitehead	United Federal
1965	Bertram Owen-Smith	Rhodesian Front
1970	Andre Sothern Holland	Rhodesian Front
1974	Andre Sothern Holland	Rhodesian Front
1977	Andre Sothern Holland	Rhodesian Front
Constituency abolished 1979–1990
Harare North
1990	Tirivanhu Mudariki	ZANU–PF
1995	Nyasha Chikwinya	ZANU–PF
2000	Trudy Stevenson	MDC
2005	Trudy Stevenson	MDC
2008	Theresa Makone	MDC–T
2013	Tongesayi Mudambo	ZANU–PF
2018	Rusty Markham	MDC Alliance
Hatcliffe
2023	Agency Gumbo	CCC

== Election results ==
Parliamentary Election 2008: Harare North
Party	Candidate	Votes	%	±%
MDC–T	Mrs Theresa Maonei Makone	6,710	63.83	−4.86
ZANU–PF	Justice Zvandasara	3,135	29.82	−1.49
Independent	Gladman Mukumbudzi	441	4.20	+4.20
UPP	Faith Kamutsungira	226	2.15	+2.15
Majority		3,575	34.01	−3.37
Turnout		10,512	42.60	
MDC–T hold				

== See also ==
- List of Zimbabwean parliamentary constituencies

== Notes and references ==
=== References ===
- Zimbabwe Electoral Commission, Elections to the House of Assembly
