= Hugh Beadle =

Rhodesian lawyer and politician

The Right Honourable Sir Hugh Beadle CMG OBE PC
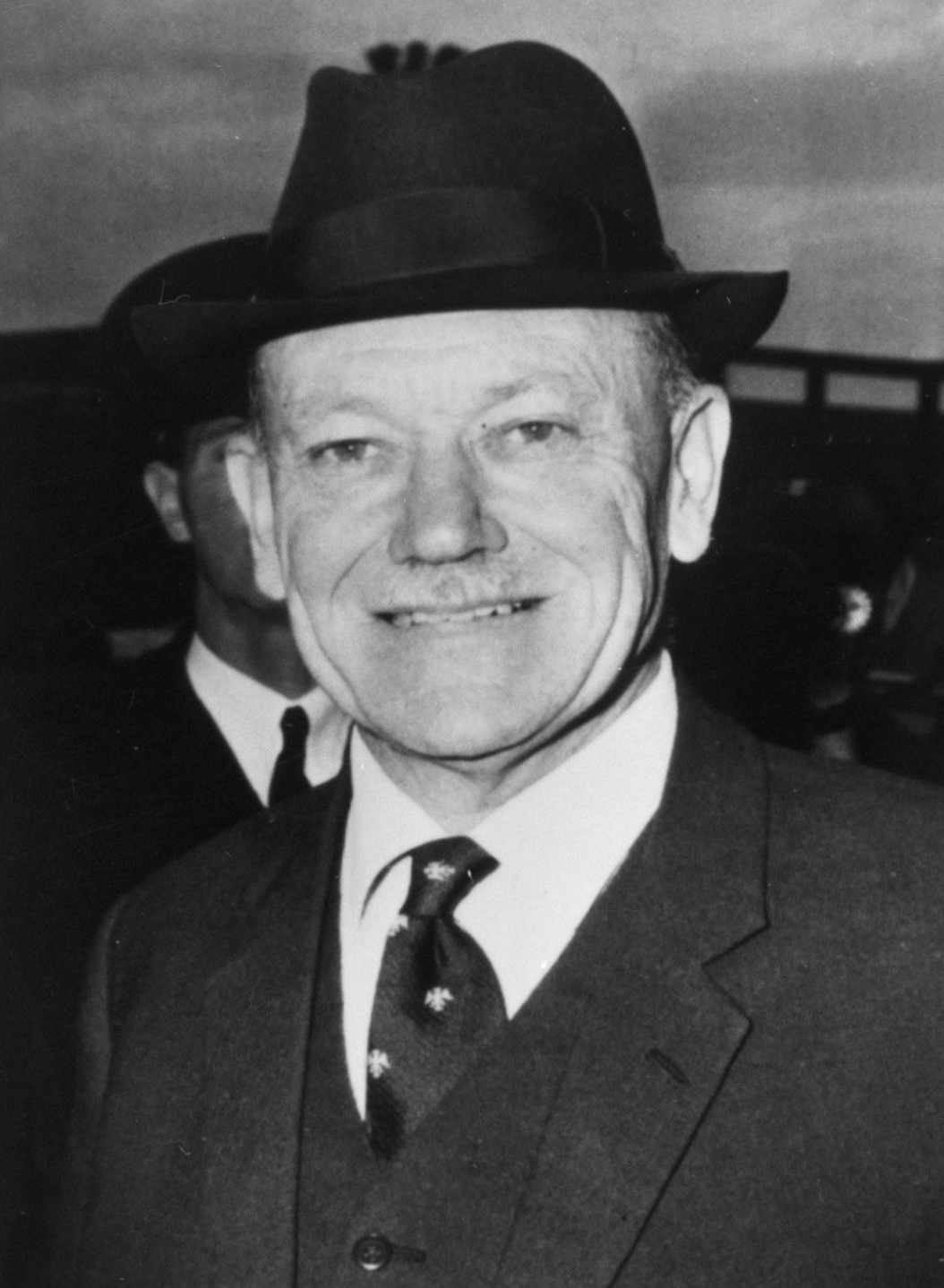
- Beadle in 1965

7th Chief Justice of Southern Rhodesia
- In office 9 March 1961 – 17 April 1977
- Preceded by: John Murray
- Succeeded by: Hector Macdonald

Minister of Health and Education
- In office 23 April 1948 – 20 July 1950
- Prime Minister: Godfrey Huggins
- Preceded by: New office
- Succeeded by: George Davenport (Education); William Winterton (Health)

Minister of Justice
- In office 10 May 1946 – 20 July 1950
- Prime Minister: Sir Godfrey Huggins
- Preceded by: Harry Bertin
- Succeeded by: Julian Greenfield

Minister of Internal Affairs
- In office 10 May 1946 – 20 July 1950
- Prime Minister: Sir Godfrey Huggins
- Preceded by: Sir Ernest Lucas Guest
- Succeeded by: Julian Greenfield

Parliamentary Secretary to the Prime Minister
- In office 1 June 1940 – 8 March 1946
- Prime Minister: Sir Godfrey Huggins

Member of the Southern Rhodesian Legislative Assembly for Bulawayo North
- In office 14 April 1939 – 20 July 1950
- Preceded by: John Banks Brady; Allan Ross Welsh
- Succeeded by: Cyril Hatty

Personal details
- Born: Thomas Hugh William Beadle; 6 February 1905 Salisbury, Southern Rhodesia
- Died: 14 December 1980 (aged 75) Johannesburg, South Africa
- Party: United Party
- Education: Cape Town University; The Queen's College, Oxford

Military service
- Allegiance: United Kingdom; Southern Rhodesia
- Branch: Royal Air Force; British Army
- Service years: 1928–1933; 1939–1940
- Rank: Flying Officer; Captain
- Wars: Second World War

Sir Thomas Hugh William Beadle, CMG, OBE, PC (6 February 1905 – 14 December 1980) was a Rhodesian lawyer, politician and judge who served as Chief Justice of Southern Rhodesia from March 1961 to November 1965, and as Chief Justice of Rhodesia from November 1965 until April 1977. He came to international prominence against the backdrop of Rhodesia's Unilateral Declaration of Independence (UDI) from Britain in November 1965, upon which he initially stood by the British Governor Sir Humphrey Gibbs as an adviser; he then provoked acrimony in British government circles by declaring Ian Smith's post-UDI administration legal in 1968.

Born and raised in the Southern Rhodesian capital Salisbury, Beadle read law in the Union of South Africa and in Great Britain before commencing practice in Bulawayo in 1931. He became a member of the Southern Rhodesian Legislative Assembly for Godfrey Huggins's ruling United Party in 1939. Appointed Huggins's Parliamentary Private Secretary in 1940, he retained that role until 1946, when he became Minister of Internal Affairs and Justice; the Education and Health portfolios were added two years later. He retired from politics in 1950 to become a Judge of the High Court of Southern Rhodesia. In 1961, he was knighted and appointed Chief Justice of Southern Rhodesia; three years later he became president of the High Court's new Appellate Division and a member of the British Privy Council.

Beadle held the Rhodesian Front, the governing party from 1962, in low regard, dismissing its Justice Minister Desmond Lardner-Burke as a "small time country solicitor". As independence talks between Britain and Southern Rhodesia gravitated towards stalemate, Beadle repeatedly attempted to arrange a compromise. He continued these efforts after UDI, and brought Harold Wilson and Smith together for talks aboard HMS Tiger. The summit failed; Wilson afterwards castigated Beadle for not persuading Smith to settle.

Beadle's de jure recognition of the post-UDI government in Rhodesia in 1968 outraged the Wilson government and drew accusations from the British Prime Minister and others that he had furtively supported UDI all along. His true motives remain the subject of speculation. After Smith declared a republic in 1970, Beadle continued as Chief Justice; he was almost removed from the Imperial Privy Council, but kept his place following Wilson's 1970 electoral defeat soon after. Beadle retired in April 1977 and thereafter sat as an acting judge in special trials for terrorist offences.

== Early life and education ==
Thomas Hugh William Beadle (generally known as Hugh) was born in Salisbury, Southern Rhodesia, on 6 February 1905, the only son and eldest child of Arthur William Beadle and his wife Christiana Maria (née Fischer). He had two sisters. The family was politically conservative and favoured joining the Union of South Africa during the latter years of Company rule, sharing a firm consensus that Sir Charles Coghlan and his responsible government movement were, in Beadle's recollection, "a pretty wild bunch of jingoes". Responsible government ultimately prevailed in the 1922 referendum of the mostly white electorate, and Southern Rhodesia became a self-governing colony the following year.

After attending Salisbury Boys' School, Milton High School in Bulawayo and Diocesan College, Rondebosch, Beadle studied law at the University of Cape Town. He completed his Bachelor of Laws degree in 1928, then continued his studies in England as a Rhodes Scholar at The Queen's College, Oxford. There he played rugby and tennis for the college, boxed for the university and qualified as a pilot with the Oxford University Air Squadron. On 16 July 1928, Beadle received his commission as a Pilot Officer (Class AA) in the Reserve of Air Force Officers, Royal Air Force. On 16 January 1930, he was promoted to the rank of Flying Officer, was transferred to Class C in 1931 and completed his service with the RAF on 16 July 1933. He graduated with a second-class Bachelor of Civil Law degree in 1930, and soon after was called to the English bar. He briefly read in London chambers before commencing practice in Bulawayo in 1931.

In 1934, he married Leonie Barry, a farmer's daughter from Barrydale in the Cape of Good Hope; they had two daughters.

== Political and judicial career ==
=== MP and Cabinet minister ===
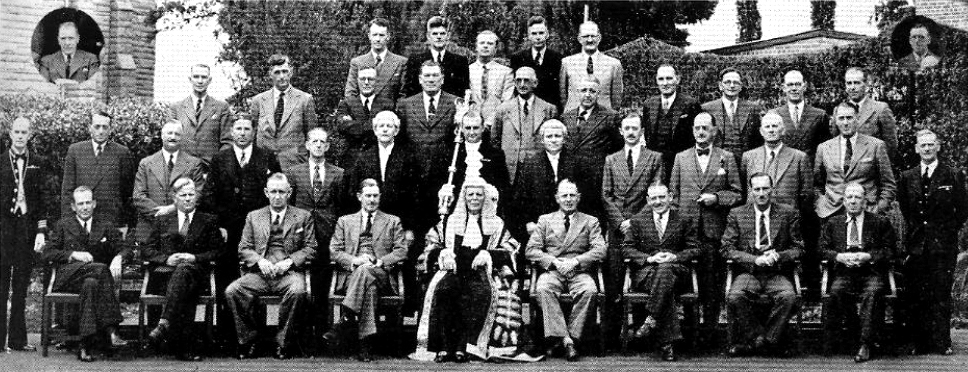
The seventh Southern Rhodesian Legislative Assembly, 1948. Beadle is third from the right in the front row, Huggins fourth from the left.

After returning to Southern Rhodesia, Beadle took an interest in politics; he joined the United Party, created from the former Rhodesia Party and the conservative faction of the Reform Party to contest the 1934 general election. He was attracted to the United Party not so much by its policies but by his admiration for its leading figures—he considered the Prime Minister Godfrey Huggins "a man of the calibre I think of Rhodes". The Southern Rhodesian electoral system allowed only those who met certain financial and educational qualifications to vote. The criteria were applied equally to all regardless of race, but since most black citizens did not meet the set standards, the electoral roll and the colonial Legislative Assembly were overwhelmingly from the white minority (about 5% of the population). The United Party broadly represented commercial interests, civil servants and the professional classes.

Beadle stood in Bulawayo South in the 1934 election, challenging Harry Davies, the Labour Party leader. Davies defeated Beadle by 458 votes to 430, but the United Party won decisively elsewhere and formed a new government with 24 out of the 30 parliament seats. Huggins, who remained prime minister, held Beadle in high regard and made him a close associate. In the 1939 election, Beadle won a three-way contest in Bulawayo North with 461 votes out of 869, and became a United Party MP. Beadle was seconded to the Gold Coast Regiment with the rank of temporary captain following the outbreak of the Second World War, but was released from military service at the request of the Southern Rhodesian government to serve as Huggins's Parliamentary Secretary, "with access to all ministers and top-ranking officials on the PM's business to speed up affairs". He held this post from 1940 to 1946, during which time he was also Deputy Advocate General for the Southern Rhodesian armed forces. In the 1945 New Year Honours, he was appointed an Officer of the Order of the British Empire (OBE). For his service during the war, Beadle was also honoured by the King of the Hellenes with the rank of Officer of the Order of the Phoenix.

In the first post-war election in 1946, Beadle defeated Labour's Cecil Maurice Baker in Bulawayo North by 666 votes to 196. He was appointed Minister of Justice and Minister of Internal Affairs. The same year he was made a King's Counsel. Two years later, after retaining his seat in the 1948 election with a large majority, he was assigned two more portfolios, those of Education and Health. Around this time he turned down an approach from a group of Liberal and rebel United Party MPs to challenge Huggins's premiership. Beadle had entered the Cabinet at a time when relations between the United Party and the British Labour Party were warming. He formed a good relationship with Aneurin Bevan, the UK Minister of Health, and put considerable work into attempting to create a Southern Rhodesian system similar to National Insurance in Britain. These efforts were largely unsuccessful, but did lead to a maternity grant for white mothers, nicknamed the "Beadle baby scheme". Beadle retired from politics in 1950 to accept a seat on the Southern Rhodesian High Court. This decision surprised many of his contemporaries; Beadle would explain later that he left politics as he did not feel he would work well under his United Party colleague Edgar Whitehead, whose subsequent rise to the premiership he correctly predicted. Having served for more than three years as a member of the Executive Council of Southern Rhodesia, he was granted the right in August 1950 to retain the title "The Honourable" for life.

=== Judicial career ===
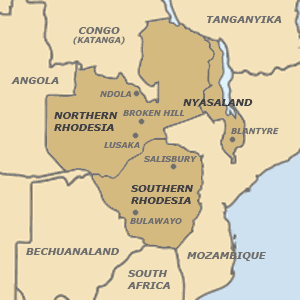
The three territories of the Federation of Rhodesia and Nyasaland (1953–63)

Beadle filled the seat on the High Court bench vacated by Sir Robert Tredgold, who had just been appointed Chief Justice of Southern Rhodesia. Despite his close relationship with Huggins, Beadle had strong misgivings regarding Federation with Northern Rhodesia and Nyasaland, which became Huggins's flagship project. (Note: Huggins and Northern Rhodesia's Sir Roy Welensky envisioned the amalgamation of the two Rhodesias into a unitary state that would eventually become a dominion or Commonwealth realm. British politicians rejected this idea, asserting that black Northern Rhodesians would never accept it, but agreed to consider a Federation on the condition that neighbouring Nyasaland was also included.) Beadle argued that since the British government would never devolve indigenous African affairs to Federal responsibility, native policy in the three territories would never be co-ordinated, meaning "the thing was bound to crash". Nevertheless, Huggins sent him to London in 1949 to discuss the legal problems of the proposed Federation with the British government. Beadle later expressed regrets that he had not played a bigger role in drawing up the constitution for the Federation, which was inaugurated as an indissoluble entity in 1953, following a mostly white referendum in Southern Rhodesia. Huggins spent three years as Federal Prime Minister before retiring in 1956. Whitehead became Prime Minister of Southern Rhodesia in 1958.

After Leonie's death in 1953, Beadle married Olive Jackson, of Salisbury, in 1954. He later said that he was repeatedly asked to resign from the bench to become the Federal Minister of Law or stand for Prime Minister of Southern Rhodesia, but "didn't regard any of the issues as crucial enough to warrant my going back". Beadle's biographer Claire Palley describes him as "a learned, fair but also adventurous judge". He was appointed a Companion of the Order of St Michael and St George (CMG) in the 1957 New Year Honours. In August 1959, amid rising black nationalism and opposition to the Federation, particularly in the two northern territories, Beadle chaired a three-man tribunal on the Southern Rhodesian government's preventive detention of black nationalist leaders without trial during the disturbances. He upheld the government's actions, reporting that the Southern Rhodesia African National Congress had disseminated "subversive propaganda", encouraged racial hatred, intimidated people into joining and undermined the authority of tribal chiefs, government officials and police.

In 1960, Beadle was a member of the Monckton Commission on the Federation's future. According to Aidan Crawley, a British member of the commission, Beadle began the process "as a radical advocate of white supremacy" but later expressed markedly different views. The commissioners "hardly agreed on anything", in Beadle's recollection. While not recommending dissolution, the Monckton report was strongly critical of the Federation. It advocated a wide range of reforms, rejected any further advance towards Federal independence until these were implemented, and called for the territories to be permitted to secede if opposition continued. Beadle was knighted in the 1961 New Year Honours and the same year appointed Chief Justice of the High Court of Southern Rhodesia. A primary school in Bulawayo was named after him. In Mehta v. City of Salisbury (1961), a case challenging the racial segregation of a public swimming pool, Beadle decided that apartheid made precedents in South African case law invalid, ruled that the plaintiff's dignity had been unlawfully affronted, and awarded him damages. (Note: Beadle ruled that while the City of Salisbury had provided "substantially equal swimming pools for different races", the effect was to arouse "feelings of humiliation, insult and of inferiority" among non-whites. The defence argument—that whites equally suffered by being excluded from facilities reserved for other races—was rejected by Beadle as disingenuous, under the reasoning that such pools only existed because of white "prejudice against ... mixed bathing".) Following continued black nationalist opposition to the Federation, particularly in Nyasaland, the British government announced in 1962 that Nyasaland would be allowed to secede. This was soon extended to Northern Rhodesia as well, and at the end of 1963 the Federation was dismantled.

Whitehead's United Federal Party was defeated in the 1962 Southern Rhodesian general election by the Rhodesian Front (RF), an all-white, firmly conservative party led by Winston Field whose declared goal was independence for Southern Rhodesia without major constitutional changes and without commitment to any set timetable regarding black majority rule. RF proponents downplayed black nationalist grievances regarding land ownership and segregation, and argued that despite the racial imbalance in domestic politics—whites made up 5% of the population, but over 90% of registered voters—the electoral system was not racist as the franchise was based on financial and educational qualifications rather than ethnicity. Beadle expressed an extremely low opinion of the RF. Ian Smith, who replaced Field as prime minister in 1964, was in Beadle's eyes an unconvincing leader; Desmond Lardner-Burke, the Justice Minister, was a "fascist" and a "small time country solicitor ... incapable of producing correct documents for an undefended divorce action". The same year Smith took over, Beadle became a member of the Privy Council in London and president of the new Appellate Division of the Southern Rhodesian High Court. In this latter role, he blocked a Legislative Assembly act to extend periods of preventive restriction outside times of emergency, ruling it against the declaration of rights contained in Southern Rhodesia's 1961 constitution.

=== UDI ===
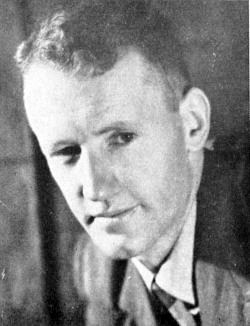
Ian Smith, the Rhodesian Prime Minister

Britain granted independence to Northern Rhodesia and Nyasaland, renamed Zambia and Malawi respectively, under black majority governments in 1964. As independence talks between the British and Southern Rhodesian governments continued with little progress, speculation began to mount that the colonial government might attempt a unilateral declaration of independence (UDI) if no accommodation could be found. The British High Commissioner in Salisbury, J B Johnston, had few doubts about how Beadle would respond to such an act, writing that he was "quite certain that no personal considerations would deflect him for a moment from administering the law with absolute integrity." Arthur Bottomley, the British Сommonwealth Secretary, took a similar line, describing Beadle to the Prime Minister Harold Wilson as "a staunch constitutionalist" who would be disposed to "frustrate any illegal action by Mr Smith's government".

Beadle told Wilson that he and the judiciary would stand by the law in the event of a UDI, but that he expected the armed forces and police to side with the post-UDI authorities. He thought UDI would be a political and economic mistake for Rhodesia, and attempted to dissuade Smith from this course of action, but at the same time asserted that if UDI occurred it was "not the function of a court to attempt to end the revolution and restore legality". He warned his High Court colleagues that he would not direct "a judicial rebellion against the Rhodesian government".

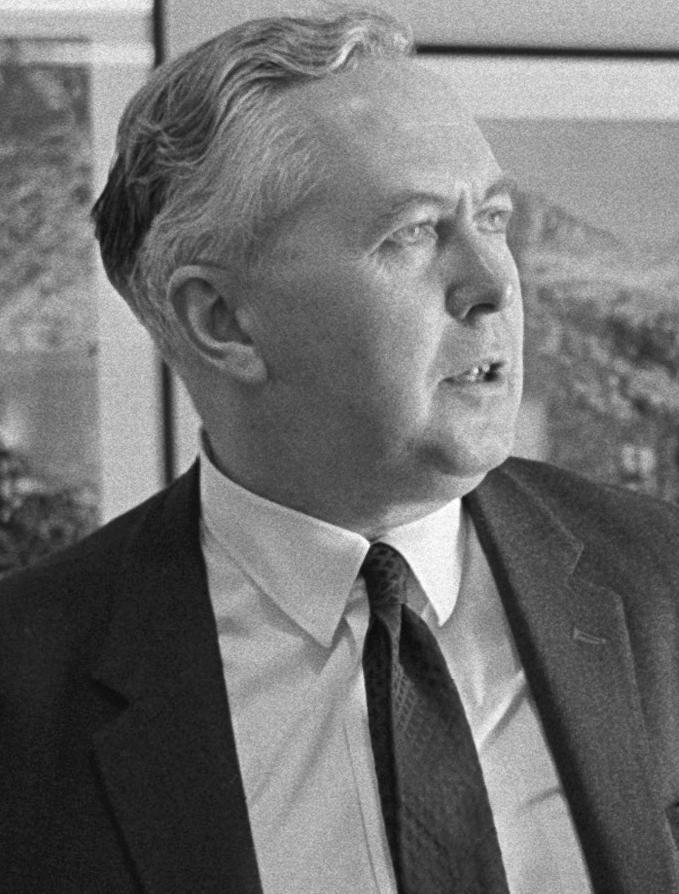
Harold Wilson, the British Prime Minister

Smith and Wilson made little progress towards a settlement during 1964 and 1965; each accused the other of being unreasonable. The RF won a decisive victory in the May 1965 general election. After efforts to forge a compromise in London in early October 1965 failed, Wilson, desperate to avert UDI, travelled to Salisbury later that month to continue negotiations. Beadle's "irrepressible ingenuity led to an incredible succession of proposals for a settlement", Wilson recalled, but these talks also failed. The two sides agreed on an investigatory Royal Commission, possibly chaired by Beadle, to recommend a path towards independence, but could not settle on the terms. Beadle continued to seek a compromise, and on 8 November persuaded Smith to allow him to go to London to meet Wilson again. Beadle told Wilson that he thought Smith was personally disposed to continue talks but under pressure from some of his ministers to abandon negotiations. Wilson told the British House of Commons that Beadle had provided "wise advice" to both governments, and was "welcome [in] this country not only for his sagacity, judgement, and humanity but as a man with the courage of a lion."

Beadle later wrote to his fellow High Court judge Benjamin Goldin that he thought he had "saved the situation" by going to London, having persuaded Wilson to give some ground on the terms for the Royal Commission, but his trip alarmed the pro-UDI camp in the Rhodesian Cabinet, who feared that Beadle might be carrying a message to the Governor Sir Humphrey Gibbs telling him to prorogue parliament. Smith and his Cabinet declared independence on 11 November 1965, while Beadle was at Lusaka Airport on his way home. Smith later rejected the suggestion that Beadle could have had anything significant to tell them on his return, saying that "the only thing that Beadle could have done when he got back was to have talked us out of insisting on our questions".

Before announcing UDI to the nation, Smith, Lardner-Burke and the Deputy Prime Minister Clifford Dupont visited Gibbs at Government House to inform him personally and ask him to resign. Gibbs made clear that he would not do so, but indicated that he would vacate Government House and return to his farm. When Beadle arrived later in the day, he not only persuaded Gibbs to stay at the official residence, but moved in himself to provide advice and moral support. On Beadle's counsel, Gibbs instructed those responsible for law and order in Rhodesia to stay at their posts and carry on as normal. When the Governor showed no sign of stepping down, Smith's government effectively replaced him with Dupont, appointing the latter to the post of Officer Administering the Government created by the 1965 constitution attached to UDI. Lardner-Burke asked Beadle to administer the oath of allegiance to Dupont, but was rebuffed; Beadle said he would be committing a criminal offence if he did so.

The UK government introduced extensive economic and political sanctions against Rhodesia and indicated that any dialogue had to take place through Gibbs. Beadle was told to liaise with Lardner-Burke regarding any proposals Smith's government might have. Beadle would later recount that the post-UDI government briefly threatened him, telling him to "go now, otherwise you lose your job", but he was ultimately left alone. The Chief Justice noted in his diary that Smith's government was "not prepared to force [a] showdown with the judges".

=== Madzimbamuto case and Tiger talks ===
During the immediate post-UDI period Beadle, in his role as Chief Justice, occupied a unique position as he could speak directly with all the main players—Gibbs, Smith and Wilson. He became the main intermediary between them, and received a dormant commission from the UK government to replace Gibbs as governor in case of necessity. He visited London in January 1966 and, according to Wilson's Attorney General Elwyn Jones, was "scornful of the 1965 constitution". Some in Rhodesia criticised Beadle for going to London, or accused him of siding with Gibbs against Smith. The Chief Justice insisted that he was just trying to do his best for Rhodesia, a claim Smith accepted, saying Beadle "thought more of his country than of his position". The UK Foreign Office remained wary, speculating in a January 1966 report that while the British government hoped to reclaim Rhodesia "in such a way that policy and thinking is reoriented, racial attitudes changed, and the path to majority rule firmly laid," the Chief Justice "would be content to see a 1961-type constitution, without independence, remain for a long time".

Beadle summarised the Rhodesian judiciary's position in light of UDI by saying simply that the judges would carry on with their duties "according to the law", but this non-committal stance was challenged by legal cases heard at the High Court. The first of these was Madzimbamuto v. Lardner-Burke N. O. and Others, concerning Daniel Madzimbamuto, a black nationalist detained without trial five days before UDI under emergency powers. When Lardner-Burke's ministry prolonged the state of emergency in February 1966, Madzimbamuto's wife appealed for his release, arguing that since the UK government had declared UDI illegal and outlawed the Rhodesian government, the state of emergency (and, by extension, her husband's imprisonment) had no legal basis. The High Court's General Division ruled on 9 September 1966 that the UK retained legal sovereignty, but that to "avoid chaos and a vacuum in the law" the Rhodesian government should be considered to be in control of law and order to the same extent as before UDI. Madzimbamuto appealed to Beadle's Appellate Division, which considered the case over the next year and a half.

Beadle arranged "talks about talks" between the British and Rhodesian governments during 1966, which led to Smith and Wilson meeting personally aboard HMS Tiger off Gibraltar between 2 and 4 December. Beadle had to be hoisted aboard because of a back injury. Negotiations snagged primarily over the matter of the transition. Wilson insisted on the abandonment of the 1965 constitution, the dissolution of the post-UDI government and a period under a British Governor—conditions that Smith saw as tantamount to surrender, particularly as the British proposed to draft and introduce the new constitution only after a fresh test of opinion under UK control. Indeed, Smith had warned Beadle before the summit that unless he "could assure his people that a reasonable constitution had been agreed", he would feel unable to settle. Smith said he could not agree without first consulting his ministers in Salisbury, infuriating Wilson, who declared that a central condition of the talks had been that he and Smith would have plenipotentiary powers to make a deal.

Beadle agreed with Smith that a deal ending UDI without any prior agreement on the replacement constitution would meet with widespread opposition among white Rhodesians, but still felt that Salisbury should agree. He asked Smith to commend the terms to his colleagues in Salisbury, speculating that if he did the Cabinet would surely accept. Smith refused to make such a commitment, much to the disappointment of Beadle and Gibbs, and signed the final document only to acknowledge it as an accurate record. Wilson was furious with Beadle, feeling that he should have taken a far firmer line to persuade Smith to settle; after Beadle left the meeting, Wilson said that he "could not understand how any man could have a slipped disc whom Providence had failed to provide with a backbone". Beadle and Gibbs urged Smith to reconsider during the journey home, but made little headway.

During the Rhodesian Cabinet meeting on the proposals, the judges were kept informed by the "expression on Sir Hugh's face and from comments of increasing despair", Goldin later wrote; the Chief Justice "spent the whole day in his chambers looking more anxious and despondent after each occasion on which he was smuggled into the Cabinet meeting to explain the meaning or effect of particular provisions". On 5 December 1966, when Beadle heard at Government House that Smith's ministers had rejected the terms, he stood "as though pole-axed", Gibbs's Private Secretary Sir John Pestell recalled, and appeared close to collapse. The judge's wife and daughter helped him to slowly return to his room.

=== De facto decision; rejection of royal prerogative ===
The United Nations instituted mandatory economic sanctions against Rhodesia in December 1966. Over the next year British diplomatic activity regarding Rhodesia was diminished; the UK government's stated policy shifted towards NIBMAR—"no independence before majority rule". Beadle grappled with the Rhodesian problem privately and in correspondence, attempting to reconcile the Smith administration's control over the country with the unconstitutional nature of UDI. Erwin Griswold, the United States Solicitor General, wrote to him that as he saw it the Rhodesian judges could not recognise the post-UDI government as de facto while also claiming to act under the Queen's commission.

Ruling on Madzimbamuto's appeal in January 1968, Beadle and three other judges decided that Smith's post-UDI order was not de jure but should be acknowledged as the de facto government by virtue of its "effective control over the state's territory". Sir Robert Tredgold, the former Southern Rhodesian and Federal Chief Justice, told Gibbs that Beadle had thereby "sold the pass" and "should be asked to leave Government House". The following month, considering the fate of James Dhlamini, Victor Mlambo and Duly Shadreck, three black Rhodesians sentenced to death before UDI for murder and terrorist offences, Beadle upheld Salisbury's power to execute the men. Whitehall reacted by announcing on 1 March 1968 that at the request of the UK government, the Queen had exercised the royal prerogative of mercy and commuted the sentences to life imprisonment. Dhlamini and the others promptly applied for a permanent stay of execution.

At the hearing for Dhlamini and Mlambo on 4 March 1968, Beadle dismissed the statement from London, saying it was a decision by the UK government and not the Queen herself, and that in any case the 1961 constitution had transferred the prerogative of mercy from Britain to the Rhodesian Executive Council. "The present government is the fully de facto government and as such is the only power that can exercise the prerogative," he concluded. "It would be strange indeed if the United Kingdom government, exercising no internal power in Rhodesia, were given the right to exercise the prerogative of clemency." The Judge President Sir Vincent Quenet and Justice Hector Macdonald agreed, and the application was dismissed. Dhlamini, Mlambo and Shadreck were hanged two days later.

Justice John Fieldsend of the High Court's General Division resigned in protest, writing to Gibbs that he no longer believed the High Court to be defending the rights of Rhodesian citizens. Beadle told reporters that "Her Majesty is quite powerless in this matter," and that "it is to be deplored that the Queen was brought into this". At Government House, the Chief Justice berated Gibbs for "dragging the Queen into the political argument". To the Governor's astonishment, Beadle conceded that for some time he had no longer considered himself to be sitting under the 1961 constitution, but had not made this clear as he had not fully accepted the 1965 constitution as valid. Gibbs told him to leave Government House forthwith. They never met again. (Note: Beadle's dormant commission was withdrawn on 15 March. He took with him most of the messages Wilson and Gibbs had exchanged during 1965 and 1966, and refused to return them. The British government briefly attempted to recover these but ultimately let Beadle keep them, deciding that their publication would be awkward but little more. Beadle wrote to Gibbs that he would keep the papers safe in South Africa.)

In his analysis of Beadle's behaviour, Manuele Facchini suggests that the Chief Justice considered the matter from a dominion-style viewpoint — by stressing the 1961 constitution and the rights held by Salisbury thereunder, he was repudiating not the royal prerogative itself, but rather the attempt to exercise it at the behest of British rather than Rhodesian ministers. Kenneth Young comments that the British government's involvement of the Queen inadvertently strengthened the post-UDI authorities' position; outraged, many in Rhodesia who had heretofore rejected UDI now threw their weight behind the RF. Beadle, deeply disillusioned, wrote to a friend that he was "thoroughly fed up with the way the Wilson government had behaved in this whole affair."

=== De jure decision ===
Madzimbamuto petitioned for the right to appeal against his detention to the Judicial Committee of the Privy Council in London; the Rhodesian Appellate Division ruled that he had no right to do so, but the Privy Council considered his case anyway. It ruled in his favour on 23 July 1968, deciding that orders for detention made by the Rhodesian government were invalid regardless of whether they were under the 1961 or 1965 constitution, and that Madzimbamuto was illegally detained. Harry Elinder Davies, one of the Rhodesian judges, announced on 8 August that the Rhodesian courts would not consider this ruling binding as they no longer accepted the Privy Council as part of the Rhodesian judicial hierarchy. Justice J R Dendy Young resigned in protest at Davies's ruling on 12 August and four days later became Chief Justice of Botswana. Madzimbamuto would remain in prison until 1974.

Beadle and his judges granted full de jure recognition to the post-UDI government on 13 September 1968, while rejecting the appeals of 32 black nationalists who one month earlier had been convicted of terrorist offences and sentenced to death. Beadle declared that while he believed the Rhodesian judiciary should respect rulings of the Privy Council "so far as possible", the judgement of 23 July had made it legally impossible for Rhodesian judges to continue under the 1961 constitution. He asserted that as he could not countenance a legal vacuum, the only alternative was the 1965 constitution. Referring to the Privy Council's decision that the UK might yet remove the post-UDI government, he said that "on the facts as they exist today, the only prediction which this court can make is that sanctions will not succeed in overthrowing the present government ... and that there are no other factors which might succeed in doing so". (Note: To support this argument, Macdonald referred to the assertion by the 17th-century Dutch jurist Hugo Grotius that "the purpose of governing and the purpose of destroying cannot subsist together". Ruling that Britain's sanctions campaign against Rhodesia constituted economic warfare, the court concluded that the UK could not concurrently be seen as governing the country.) UDI, the associated 1965 constitution and the government were thereafter considered de jure by the Rhodesian legal system.

The British Commonwealth Secretary George Thomson expressed outrage, accusing Beadle and the other judges of breaching "the fundamental laws of the land", while Gibbs stated that since his position as governor existed under the 1961 constitution he could only reject the ruling. An internal UK Foreign Office memorandum rejected Beadle's argument but recognised his belief that "because of the effect of the effluxion of time, he was entitled to take a different view", and concluded that the Chief Justice's argument was "sufficiently plausible to make it difficult to say that that position is manifestly improper or that, in adopting it, Sir Hugh Beadle is manifestly guilty of misconduct." Beadle explained in a 1972 interview: "We had been doing our best to try and uphold the law and when the thing was in the revolutionary stage we dug our toes in, we wouldn't budge. But then as the government became more and more entrenched we had to apply the principle of law, which says that if a revolution succeeds the law changes with it. Yet because we accepted the inevitable we're blamed by a lot of people for being responsible for the revolution, which is a very different thing."

=== Threatened removal from Privy Council; republican Chief Justice ===
Beadle's acceptance of the post-UDI order effectively placed him on the side of the RF and removed any chance of his regaining an intermediary role with Wilson. The British Prime Minister minimised the political impact of the Chief Justice's decision by presenting it as evidence that Beadle had furtively supported UDI all along, and subsequently excluded him from the diplomatic dialogue. Wilson pursued a second initiative which led to a fresh round of talks with Smith off Gibraltar aboard HMS Fearless in October 1968. Marked progress towards agreement was made but the Rhodesian delegation demurred on a new British proposal, the "double safeguard". This would involve elected black Rhodesians controlling a blocking quarter in the Rhodesian parliament, with the power to veto retrogressive legislation, and thereafter having the right to appeal passed bills to the Privy Council in London. Smith's team accepted the principle of the blocking quarter but agreement could not be reached on the technicalities; the involvement of the Privy Council was rejected by Smith as a "ridiculous" provision that would prejudice Rhodesia's sovereignty. The talks ended without success.

Smith's government held a referendum on 20 June 1969 in which the mostly white electorate overwhelmingly voted in favour of both a new constitution and the declaration of a republic. Four days later the UK Foreign Office released Gibbs from his post, withdrew the British residual mission in Salisbury and closed the post-UDI government's representative office at Rhodesia House in London. The 1969 constitution introduced a President as head of state, a multiracial senate, separate black and white electoral rolls (each with qualifications) and a mechanism whereby the number of black MPs would increase in line with the proportion of income tax revenues paid by black citizens. This process would stop once blacks had the same number of seats as whites; the declared goal was not majority rule, but rather "parity between the races".

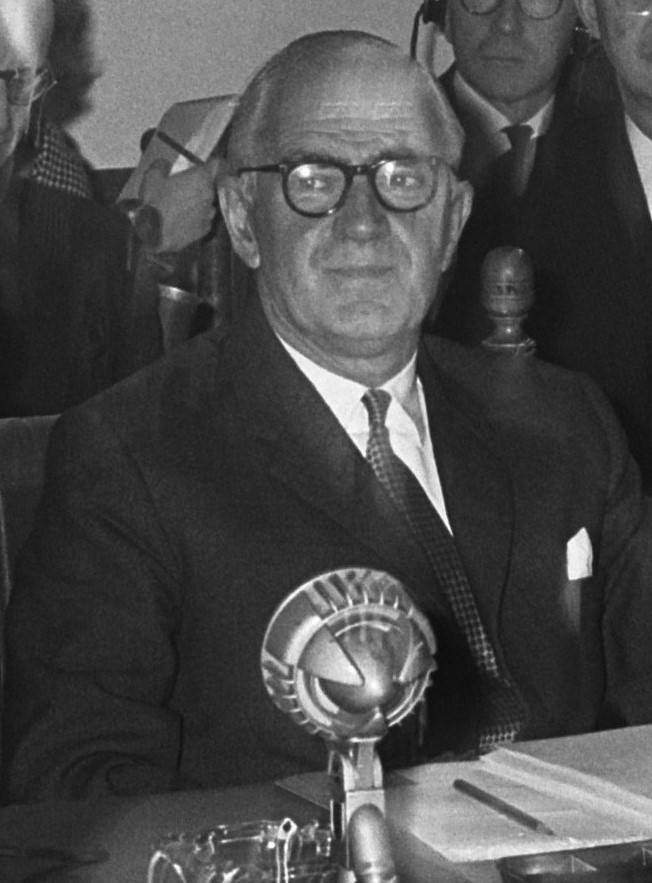
Michael Stewart, Wilson's Foreign Secretary, thought the UK should remove Beadle from the Privy Council.

Michael Stewart, Wilson's Foreign Secretary, recommended that Britain take preliminary steps towards removing Beadle from the Privy Council if the Chief Justice did not resign or dissociate himself from the republic "within a week or two" after the new constitution came into force. Given the gravity of such an action—only one privy counsellor, Sir Edgar Speyer, was struck off the list during the 20th century — and the likelihood that accusations of vindictiveness would result, the British government was loath to do this, and hoped that Beadle would remove the need for it by resigning.

Smith officially declared a republic on 2 March 1970, and on 10 April the RF was decisively returned to power in the first republican election, winning all 50 white seats out of a total of 66. Six days later, Dupont was sworn in as the first president of Rhodesia. British officials learned only from the Rhodesian radio that Dupont's oath of office was administered not by Beadle but by the "Acting Chief Justice", Hector Macdonald. Beadle's absence prompted speculation in British quarters, but this promptly dissipated after The Rhodesia Herald reported on 29 April that a High Court farewell to Sir Vincent Quénet, a retiring judge, would be presided over by the republic's Chief Justice Sir Hugh Beadle. (Note: A British government memorandum speculated that Beadle may have hoped to become President himself, and may have felt too disappointed to attend Dupont's swearing-in ceremony. Facchini suggests that it may have been a last gesture of personal loyalty to the Queen.)

On 6 May 1970, Stewart suggested to Wilson that they should formally advise the Queen to remove Beadle from the Privy Council. Wilson resolved to wait until after the British general election the following month. This decision proved decisive for Beadle as, to the surprise of many, the Conservatives won the election, and Edward Heath replaced Wilson as prime minister. Heath's government decided against removing Beadle from the Privy Council, surmising that this would only hinder progress towards an accommodation with Smith. Beadle remained a privy counsellor for the rest of his life.

=== Later years ===
In May 1973, Beadle chaired the High Court appeal hearing for Peter Niesewand, a freelance reporter for the overseas press who had been convicted of espionage under the Official Secrets Act, prompting outcry abroad. Niesewand had written three articles in November 1972 claiming to describe the Rhodesian military's plans for combating communist-backed black nationalist guerrillas, and had been sentenced by a magistrate to two years' hard labour, one year suspended. Beadle, Goldin and Macdonald rejected the state prosecution and unanimously overturned the conviction, ruling that Niesewand's reports had embarrassed the government but did not damage the Rhodesian state. "Factual evidence as opposed to opinion was never given," Beadle commented. The government promptly expelled Niesewand from Rhodesia.

After Olive's death in a motor accident in 1974, Beadle married Pleasance Johnson in 1976. He retired as Chief Justice in 1977; Macdonald succeeded him. For the rest of his life, Beadle served as an acting judge in special trials where suspected insurgents were tried for terrorist offences carrying the death penalty. In March 1977, he refused to try Abel Mapane and Jotha Bango, two Botswana citizens facing arms charges, ruling that since Rhodesia and Botswana were not at war and the Rhodesian Army had crossed into Botswana to capture the accused, the court had no jurisdiction. "Were it not so it would mean this Court condoned the illegal abduction of Botswana nationals," he explained.

Beadle continued to serve under the short-lived, unrecognised government of Zimbabwe Rhodesia, which replaced the Rhodesian republic in June 1979, and under the British interim authorities following the Lancaster House Agreement of December that year. Following fresh elections in February–March 1980, the UK granted independence to Zimbabwe under the leadership of Robert Mugabe in April. Beadle died, aged 75, in Johannesburg on 14 December 1980. Hugh Beadle Primary School in Bulawayo retains its name in the 21st century.

== Personality and appraisal ==
"A short, stocky man of ruddy complexion with a toothbrush moustache," Claire Palley writes, "Beadle had a blunt manner, looking hard at all whom he encountered. His drive and enthusiasm were overwhelming, whether at work, in charitable activities, or as a courageous hunter and fisherman. He had a warm family life and many friends." According to J.R.T. Wood, Wilson "hated Beadle perhaps because Beadle was clever but spoke his mind"; the British Prime Minister described Beadle to Lord Alport shortly after UDI as combining "the courage of a lion" with "the smartness of a fox". In Lord Blake's History of Rhodesia, Beadle is characterised as "an irrepressible, bouncy extrovert, who does not always perceive the reaction which he causes in others." Garfield Todd, Premier of Southern Rhodesia from 1956 to 1958, saw Beadle as "impulsive" and "always inclined to overstate his case".

The black nationalist movement regarded Beadle as a white supremacist, pointing to his 1959 preventive detention ruling as evidence.

Wilson and other British figures saw him as two-faced for first supporting Gibbs, then declaring Smith's post-UDI government legal, and concluded that the judge must have always been a furtive UDI supporter, a theory that many have accepted. Wilson's private assistant Marcia Falkender identified Beadle as "the villain of the piece", while Bottomley dubbed him UDI's "evil genius".

Others, including Palley, Wood and Facchini, contend that Beadle was determined to avert UDI and afterwards sincere in his search for an accommodation until he came to believe this was not possible. "Beadle accepted the rebellion when he realised that he was identifying himself with 'the code of an Empire that had ceased to exist'," Facchini concludes. "Thus, he retained his Privy Counsellorship as a vestige of the Rhodesia he had known all his life."

Palley asserts that but for UDI, "Beadle would have been remembered as a Commonwealth chief justice who upheld individual liberty".

"The thing that I've regretted most is this UDI and also I've regretted more than anything the fact that later it wasn't settled," Beadle said in 1972; "I think it could have been settled at a much earlier stage if Wilson had been a bit more reasonable."

Julian Greenfield, a close friend and colleague of Beadle, considered him "one who put service to the country first and foremost and laboured unceasingly on what he believed to be its true interests." According to Palley, Beadle's own view was similar — that "he did his best for his country in a time of difficult choices".

== Notes and references ==
Footnotes

Journal and newspaper articles

- Caminada, Jerome (3 May 1973). "The Press is the enemy to Rhodesia". The Age. Melbourne. p. 9.
- Facchini, Manuele (2007). "The 'Evil Genius': Sir Hugh Beadle and the Rhodesian Crisis, 1965–1972". Journal of Southern African Studies. 33 (3). London: Routledge: 673–689. doi:10.1080/03057070701475799. S2CID 144731347.
- Kilpatrick, James J (16 May 1973). "Ousted Rhodesian Newsman Got Off Easy". The Blade. Toledo, Ohio. p. 23.
- Pratt, R Cranford (1960). "Partnership and Consent: The Monckton Report Examined". International Journal. 16 (1). Toronto: Canadian International Council: 37–49. doi:10.2307/40198516. JSTOR 40198516.
- "Sir Hugh Beadle's Wise Advice: Courage of a Lion". The Glasgow Herald. 10 November 1965. p. 11.
- "The Press: Bittersweet Victory". Time. New York. 14 May 1973.
- "Rhodesian Judge does not condone abduction". The Glasgow Herald. 23 March 1977. p. 2.
- "Hector Macdonald". The Times. London. 10 March 2011.
- "Hugh Beadle pupil swept away by flooded Mazayi River". The Chronicle. Bulawayo. 17 January 2013.

Online sources

- Palley, Claire (2004). "Beadle, Sir (Thomas) Hugh William (1905–1980)". Oxford Dictionary of National Biography (online ed.). Oxford: Oxford University Press. doi:10.1093/ref:odnb/30799. (Subscription, Wikipedia Library access or UK public library membership required.)
- Wood, J R T (1999). "Four Tall NCOs of the Life Guards: Lord Mountbatten, Harold Wilson, and the Immediate Aftermath of UDI: The Proposed Mountbatten Mission". jrtwood.com. Durban.

Bibliography

- Berlyn, Phillippa (1978). The Quiet Man: A Biography of the Hon. Ian Douglas Smith. Salisbury: M O Collins. OCLC 4282978. also includes (on pp. 240–256) Rowland, J Reid. Constitutional History of Rhodesia: An outline.
- Blake, Robert (1977). A History of Rhodesia (First ed.). London: Eyre Methuen. ISBN 978-0-413-28350-4.
- Cary, Robert; Mitchell, Diana (1977). African Nationalist Leaders in Rhodesia: Who's Who. Bulawayo: Books of Rhodesia. ISBN 978-0-86920-151-0.
- Dugard, John (1978). Human Rights and the South African Legal Order. Princeton, New Jersey: Princeton University Press. ISBN 978-1-4008-6812-4.
- Feltoe, G (2010). A Guide to the Zimbabwean Law of Delict (Third ed.). Harare: Legal Resources Foundation. ISBN 978-0-908312-69-6.
- Gowlland-Debbas, Vera (1990). Collective Responses to Illegal Acts in International Law: United Nations action in the question of Southern Rhodesia (First ed.). Leiden and New York: Martinus Nijhoff Publishers. ISBN 978-0-7923-0811-9.
- Greenfield, J M (1978). Testimony of a Rhodesian Federal. Bulawayo: Books of Rhodesia. ISBN 978-0-86920-172-5.
- Weinrich, A K H (1973). Black and White Elites in Rural Rhodesia. Manchester: Manchester University Press. ISBN 978-0-7190-0533-6.
- Willson, F M G, ed. (1963). Source Book of Parliamentary Elections and Referenda in Southern Rhodesia, 1898–1962. Salisbury: Department of Government, University College of Rhodesia and Nyasaland. OCLC 219295658.
- Wood, J R T (1983). The Welensky Papers: A History of the Federation of Rhodesia and Nyasaland. Durban: Graham Publishing. ISBN 978-0-620-06410-1.
- Wood, J R T (2005). So Far and No Further! Rhodesia's Bid For Independence During the Retreat From Empire 1959–1965. Victoria, British Columbia: Trafford Publishing. ISBN 978-1-4120-4952-8.
- Wood, J R T (2008). A Matter of Weeks Rather Than Months: The Impasse Between Harold Wilson and Ian Smith: Sanctions, Aborted Settlements and War 1965–1969. Victoria, British Columbia: Trafford Publishing. ISBN 978-1-4251-4807-2.
- Young, Kenneth (1969) [1967]. Rhodesia and Independence: A Study in British Colonial Policy. London: J M Dent & Sons. OCLC 955160.
- Annual Report of the Under Secretary to the Federal Ministry of Works For the Year Ended 30th June, 1960. Salisbury: Ministry of Works, Government of the Federation of Rhodesia and Nyasaland. 1961. OCLC 124013842.

Southern Rhodesian Legislative Assembly
Preceded by John Banks Brady; Allan Ross Welsh	Member of Parliament for Bulawayo North; 1939 – 1950	Succeeded by Cyril Hatty
Political offices
New title	Parliamentary Secretary to the Prime Minister; 1940 – 1946	Office abolished
Preceded by Sir Ernest Lucas Guest	Minister of Internal Affairs; 1946 – 1950	Succeeded by Julius Greenfield as Minister of Justice and Internal Affairs
Preceded by Harry Bertin	Minister of Justice; 1946 – 1950	Succeeded by Julius Greenfield as Minister of Justice and Internal Affairs
New title	Minister of Health and Education; 1948 – 1950	Succeeded by George Arthur Davenport as Minister of Education
New title	Minister of Health and Education; 1948 – 1950	Succeeded by William Winterton as Minister of Health
Legal offices
Preceded by Sir John Murray	Chief Justice of Southern Rhodesia; 1961 – 1977	Succeeded by Hector Macdonald
