= 1934 Southern Rhodesian general election =

- 7 November 1934

All 30 seats in the Legislative Assembly 16 seats needed for a majority
- Turnout: 64.6%
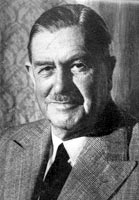
	First party	Second party	Third party
Leader	Godfrey Huggins	Harry Davies
Party	United	Labour	Reform
Leader's seat	Salisbury district	Bulawayo South
Last election	–	5 seats	16 seats
Seats won	24	5	1
Seat change	New	Steady	▼15
Popular vote	14,813	6,092	2,237
Percentage	64.01%	26.32%	9.67%
- Composition of the Legislative Assembly after the election
Prime Minister before election
Godfrey Huggins
United Party
Elected Prime Minister
Godfrey Huggins
United Party

General elections were held in Southern Rhodesia on 7 November 1934, fourth elections since the colony of Southern Rhodesia was granted self-government. The elections were called only a year after the previous elections when the Prime Minister, Godfrey Huggins, formed the United Party as a merger of the conservative section of his Reform Party and the former governing Rhodesia Party. Huggins succeeded in winning a landslide, defeating all but one of his Reform Party opponents.

== Electoral system ==
No changes were made to the franchise, the procedure of elections, or electoral boundaries since the previous election.

== Political parties ==
The Reform Party was believed by many in Rhodesia to be a left-wing party but Huggins had presented a cautiously conservative Cabinet after winning power in 1933. In particular, Finance Minister Jacob Smit was a strong believer in conventional economics and opponent of Keynesianism. The course of government led eventually to a confrontration in August 1934 with the left wing of the party over reform to the Rhodesian railways. Huggins decided to approach Sir Percy Fynn, leader of the Rhodesian Party, who pledged support for a National Government under Huggins.

However, the Acting Governor refused a dissolution on the grounds that the Assembly had many years left, and the government had not been defeated. Huggins persuaded the majority of the Executive of the Reform Party to suspend the party's constitution to allow a National Government on 17 September, and then formed the United Party with Fynn, asking a second time for a dissolution on the basis of a changed party alignment. This time the Acting Governor acceded.

== Results ==
Party	Votes	%	Seats	+/–
United Party	14,813	64.01	24	New
Rhodesia Labour Party	6,092	26.32	5	0
Reform Party	2,237	9.67	1	–15
Total	23,142	100.00	30	0
Registered voters/turnout	25,879	–		
Source: Willson

=== By constituency ===
- Lab – Rhodesia Labour Party
- Ref – Reform Party
- UP – United Party

Constituency Electorate and turnout	Candidate	Party	Votes
BULAWAYO CENTRAL; Two members 2,018 (61.4%)	†James Cowden	UP	683
BULAWAYO CENTRAL; Two members 2,018 (61.4%)	†Donald MacIntyre	Lab	654
BULAWAYO CENTRAL; Two members 2,018 (61.4%)	Arthur James Butler	UP	604
BULAWAYO CENTRAL; Two members 2,018 (61.4%)	Edward Jonathan Davies	Lab	536
BULAWAYO NORTH; Two members 1,989 (65.1%)	†John Banks Brady	UP	967
BULAWAYO NORTH; Two members 1,989 (65.1%)	†Allan Ross Welsh	UP	910
BULAWAYO NORTH; Two members 1,989 (65.1%)	David Bennie	Lab	421
BULAWAYO NORTH; Two members 1,989 (65.1%)	Frederick Martin	Lab	291
BULAWAYO SOUTH; 1,257 (70.6%)	†Harry Herbert Davies	Lab	458
BULAWAYO SOUTH; 1,257 (70.6%)	Hugh Beadle	UP	430
CHARTER; 623	†Ernest Lucas Guest	UP	unopposed
EASTERN; 886	†John Louis Martin	UP	unopposed
GATOOMA; 842 (77.3%)	†William Sydney Senior	UP	366
GATOOMA; 842 (77.3%)	Thomas Alfred Kimble	Lab	285
GWANDA; 677 (70.2%)	†Sir Hugh Grenville Williams	Ref	257
GWANDA; 677 (70.2%)	Herbert Hildeyard Phillips	UP	218
GWELO; 1,048 (63.2%)	†Frank Delano Thompson	UP	377
GWELO; 1,048 (63.2%)	Albert Hill	Lab	285
HARTLEY; 571 (79.5%)	James Joseph Conway	UP	256
HARTLEY; 571 (79.5%)	Arthur Bertram Shepherd-Cross	Ref	117
HARTLEY; 571 (79.5%)	Christopher Holderness	Lab	81
INSIZA; 644 (69.9%)	Robert Clarkson Tredgold	UP	273
INSIZA; 644 (69.9%)	Leo George Robinson	Lab	110
INSIZA; 644 (69.9%)	Joseph Hussey	Ref	67
INYATI; 756 (67.7%)	Frank Ernest Harris	UP	334
INYATI; 756 (67.7%)	John Bazeley	Lab	178
LOMAGUNDI; 818 (68.7%)	†Lewis Aloys MacDonald Hastings	UP	365
LOMAGUNDI; 818 (68.7%)	Frank Smith	Ref	197
MARANDELLAS; 812 (58.6%)	Alfred William Vincent Crawley	UP	251
MARANDELLAS; 812 (58.6%)	†Reginald Herbert Bruce Dickson	Ref	225
MATOPO; 966 (66.9%)	†Robert Alexander Fletcher	UP	412
MATOPO; 966 (66.9%)	Jonah William White	Lab	234
MAZOE; 891 (64.8%)	†Edward Walter Lionel Noaks	UP	467
MAZOE; 891 (64.8%)	Alexander Macintyre Hutchinson	Ref	110
QUE QUE; 793 (71.6%)	†Charles Walter Leppington	UP	290
QUE QUE; 793 (71.6%)	Edward Empson Webb	Lab	243
QUE QUE; 793 (71.6%)	John William Watkinson	Ref	35
RAYLTON; 1,243 (70.7%)	†Lawrence John Walter Keller	Lab	440
RAYLTON; 1,243 (70.7%)	William Hives Eastwood	UP	439
SALISBURY CENTRAL; Two members 2,257 (66.6%)	†Jacob Hendrik Smit	UP	1,125
SALISBURY CENTRAL; Two members 2,257 (66.6%)	Robert Thomson Anderson	UP	848
SALISBURY CENTRAL; Two members 2,257 (66.6%)	James Kerr Taylor	Lab	335
SALISBURY CENTRAL; Two members 2,257 (66.6%)	Roger Edward Downes	Lab	315
SALISBURY CENTRAL; Two members 2,257 (66.6%)	Charles Olley	Ref	245
SALISBURY CENTRAL; Two members 2,257 (66.6%)	†Neil Housman Wilson	Ref	204
SALISBURY DISTRICT; 966 (76.4%)	†Godfrey Huggins	UP	519
SALISBURY DISTRICT; 966 (76.4%)	† Thomas Nangle	Ref	219
SALISBURY NORTH; Two members 2,016 (69.7%)	Vernon Arthur Lewis	UP	1,208
SALISBURY NORTH; Two members 2,016 (69.7%)	†Percival Donald Leslie Fynn	UP	1,198
SALISBURY NORTH; Two members 2,016 (69.7%)	William Lane Mitchell	Ref	233
SALISBURY NORTH; Two members 2,016 (69.7%)	William Martin	Lab	172
SALISBURY SOUTH; 1,240 (71.5%)	†George Henry Walker	Lab	435
SALISBURY SOUTH; 1,240 (71.5%)	Alexander Daniel Kirstein	UP	350
SALISBURY SOUTH; 1,240 (71.5%)	Mrs. Otilia Liebermann	Ref	101
SELUKWE; 818 (68.7%)	†Robert Dunipace Gilchrist	UP	416
SELUKWE; 818 (68.7%)	Ernest Edward Fitzroy Blackwell	Ref	146
UMTALI NORTH; 864 (66.9%)	†Donald Murray Somerville	UP	429
UMTALI NORTH; 864 (66.9%)	Albert Holman	Lab	149
UMTALI SOUTH; 761 (75.7%)	†Jonathan Hunter Malcolm	Lab	329
UMTALI SOUTH; 761 (75.7%)	Edgar Cuthbert Fremantle Whitehead	UP	247
VICTORIA; 943 (76.6%)	†William Alexander Eustace Winterton	UP	641
VICTORIA; 943 (76.6%)	John Davidson	Ref	81
WANKIE; 689 (57.9%)	†Alexander Robert Thomson	UP	258
WANKIE; 689 (57.9%)	William McDonald	Lab	141

== Byelections ==
=== Hartley ===
James Joseph Conway died on 10 May 1935, leading to a byelection on 4 July 1935.

Constituency	Candidate	Party	Votes
HARTLEY	Roger Edward Downes	Ref	202
HARTLEY	Charles Malcolm Davenport	UP	146
HARTLEY	Thomas Alfred Kimble	Lab	79

=== Selukwe ===
Robert Dunipace Gilchrist resigned on 30 June 1935, leading to a byelection on 28 August 1935.

Constituency	Candidate	Party	Votes
SELUKWE	Max Danziger	UP	353
SELUKWE	Henry Frederick Edensor	Ref	182
SELUKWE	Ernest Millington	Ind UP	117

=== Umtali South ===
Following his death, there was a byelection to replace Jonathan Hunter Malcolm on 15 September 1936.

Constituency Electorate and turnout	Candidate	Party	Votes
UMTALI SOUTH; 800 (62.0%)	James Brown Lister	Lab	244
UMTALI SOUTH; 800 (62.0%)	Edgar Cuthbert Fremantle Whitehead	UP	153
UMTALI SOUTH; 800 (62.0%)	William Arthur Rail	Ref	99

=== Salisbury North ===
Following his resignation on 31 July 1936, there was a byelection to replace Vernon Arthur Lewis on 21 September 1936.

Constituency Electorate and turnout	Candidate	Party	Votes
SALISBURY NORTH; 2,035 (54.9%)	Harry Bertin	UP	595
SALISBURY NORTH; 2,035 (54.9%)	John Richard Dendy Young	Ref	522

=== Eastern ===
John Louis Martin died on 28 May 1938 and a byelection to replace him was held on 15 August 1938.

Constituency Electorate and turnout	Candidate	Party	Votes
EASTERN; 751 (81.4%)	Jacobus Petrus De Kock	UP	222
EASTERN; 751 (81.4%)	Douglas Abrahamson	UNP	160
EASTERN; 751 (81.4%)	Reginald Herbert Bruce Dickson	Ref	150
EASTERN; 751 (81.4%)	Roelof Hendrik Venter	Lab	79

=== Hartley ===
Following his death, there was a byelection to replace Roger Edward Downes on 30 August 1938.

Constituency Electorate and turnout	Candidate	Party	Votes
HARTLEY; 584 (76.7%)	Henry Hamilton Beamish	Ind	144
HARTLEY; 584 (76.7%)	Thomas James Golding	RP	125
HARTLEY; 584 (76.7%)	Leslie Manfred Noel Hodson	UP	118
HARTLEY; 584 (76.7%)	Thomas George Gibson	Ref	61
