= Ernest Lucas Guest =

Rhodesian politician (1882–1972)

Colonel The Honourable Sir Ernest Lucas Guest KBE CMG CVO
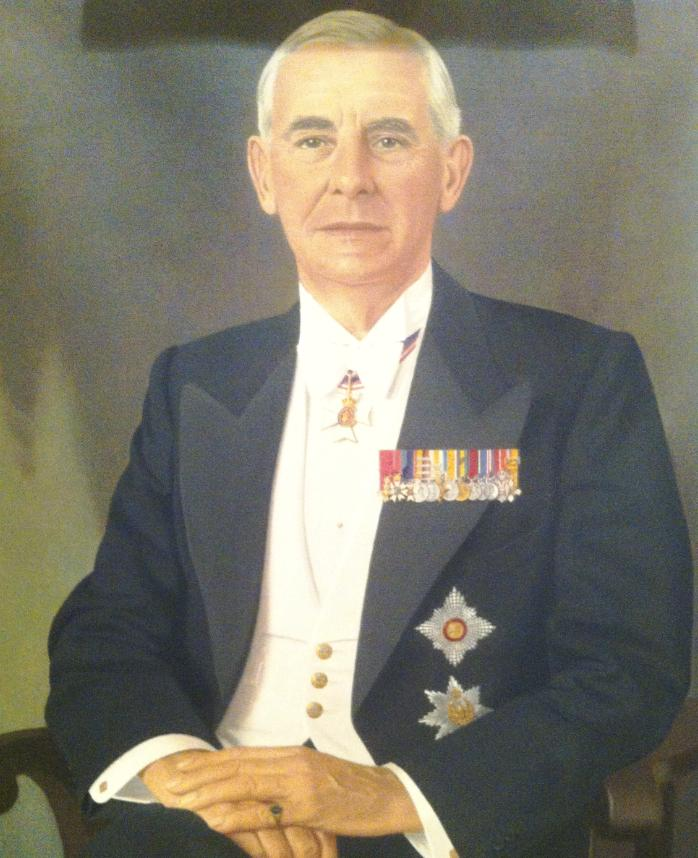
- Portrait of Col Ernest Lucas Guest

Minister of Mines and Public Works
- In office 1 June 1938 – 1 February 1944
- Prime Minister: Sir Godfrey Huggins
- Preceded by: Robert Tredgold
- Succeeded by: Leslie Fereday (Mines); Harry Bertin (Public Works)

Minister of Air
- In office 28 March 1940 – 6 May 1946
- Prime Minister: Sir Godfrey Huggins
- Preceded by: Robert Tredgold
- Succeeded by: Himself (Defence and Air)

Minister of Internal Affairs
- In office 2 February 1944 – 10 May 1946
- Prime Minister: Sir Godfrey Huggins
- Preceded by: Harry Davies
- Succeeded by: Hugh Beadle

Minister of Defence and Air
- In office 7 June 1946 – 15 September 1948
- Prime Minister: Sir Godfrey Huggins
- Preceded by: William Henry Ralston (Defence); Himself (Air)
- Succeeded by: Sir Godfrey Huggins

Minister of Finance
- In office 7 May 1946 – 26 September 1946
- Prime Minister: Sir Godfrey Huggins
- Preceded by: Max Danziger
- Succeeded by: Edgar Whitehead

Member of the Southern Rhodesian Legislative Assembly for Charter
- In office 19 September 1928 – 24 April 1946
- Preceded by: Charles Edward Gilfillan
- Succeeded by: Jacob Letterstedt Smit

Member of the Southern Rhodesian Legislative Assembly for Salisbury Gardens
- In office 25 April 1946 – 15 September 1948
- Preceded by: Sir Percival Fynn
- Succeeded by: Noel St. Quinton

Personal details
- Born: 20 August 1882 Grahamstown, Cape Colony (now South Africa)
- Died: 20 September 1972 (aged 90) Salisbury, Rhodesia
- Party: Rhodesia Party (1928–1933); United Party (1933–1946)
- Spouse: Lady Edie Guest
- Relations: Ivor Forbes Guest (nephew); Melville Guest (grandson)
- Children: Gwendolin Lucy; Maureen Edith; John Desmond Thomas; Ernest Melville Charles
- Parent: Herbert Melville Guest
- Education: St Andrew's College, Grahamstown
- Profession: politician, soldier, lawyer

Military service
- Allegiance: British Empire
- Years of service: 1899–1919
- Rank: Lieutenant-Colonel
- Battles/wars: Second Boer War; First World War

Sir Ernest Lucas Guest KBE CMG CVO (20 August 1882 – 20 September 1972) was a Rhodesian politician, lawyer and soldier. He held senior ministerial positions in the government, most notably as Minister for Air during the Second World War.

Guest was born in Grahamstown, Cape Colony. His grandfather had moved the family there, leaving Kidderminster, England, where it had been in the printing business for three generations. He saw active service in the Second Boer War, enlisting despite being underage, and again in the First World War, when he was injured in France. His legal career began while back in Southern Rhodesia between those two wars. He won a case against Sir Charles Coghlan, at the time Premier of Southern Rhodesia, and Coghlan invited him to become a partner in his firm, which became known as Coghlan, Welsh & Guest. On his return from the First World War, Guest took responsibility for the Salisbury practice.

He was elected to the Legislative Assembly in 1928 as a member of Coghlan's Rhodesia Party, representing the constituency of Charter, which he held until 1946. He first became a cabinet minister in Godfrey Huggins' government, appointed Minister of Mines and Public Works in June 1938. During the Second World War, Guest was Minister for Air and administered the Rhodesia Air Training Group. After the war he was also Minister of Defence, Minister of Finance and Leader of the House. At the 1946 elections he stood for Salisbury Gardens and held the seat until his retirement from office in 1948.

He married Edith May Jones and had two daughters and twin sons, both of whom were killed in action during the Second World War. At his death, both the High Court and Parliament paid public tributes to him. His continuing legacy is most evident in the Kariba Dam, a project that went ahead with his active support.

== Early life ==
Ernest Lucas Guest was born in Grahamstown, Cape Colony (in modern South Africa's Eastern Cape province) on 20 August 1882. Guest's grandfather had moved the family to South Africa in 1861 from Kidderminster, England, where they had been involved in the printing business for three generations. His grandfather was appointed manager of the Frontier Times, printed and published in Grahamstown. The family resided there until 1889 when Ernest's father, Herbert Melville Guest, moved them to Klerksdorp, Transvaal, after buying the local newspaper and printing business.

== Military career ==
=== Second Boer War ===
At the outbreak of the Second Boer War in 1899, Guest was below the minimum age of 18 for enlisting. He nevertheless managed to join the First City Volunteers, a Grahamstown regiment in which his father had served. Its task of guarding a bridge over a railway line was unappealing, so he took the opportunity of joining the Eastern Province Light Horse, attached to the Highland Brigade, which was recruiting volunteers who could both ride and shoot. Early in the Brigade's advance into the Orange Free State on its way to the relief of Kimberley, Guest got food poisoning and he returned to Grahamstown.

After recovering, he joined the Kimberley Mounted Corps and guided two officers from Lichtenburg to Klerksdorp, where they persuaded the Boers to surrender by bluffing that a strong British force was following close behind. The Boers soon retook the town and Guest was captured. He was sent with other prisoners to Pietersburg to be executed but he managed to escape and travelled to Warmbaths. After satisfying the authorities that he had actually been taken prisoner and had not surrendered voluntarily, he returned to his depot at Kimberley. His unit had been disbanded and he was discharged.

Guest joined up again, enlisting in Kitchener's Fighting Scouts on 2 January 1901. He was given the rank of sergeant, chasing Boer commandoes without success. He was recommended for a commission and posted to the Johannesburg Mounted Rifles, whose colonel decided that Guest was too young to lead a force composed of miners who were considerably older than him. Returning to Klerksdorp, Guest learned that the Bechuanaland Rifles were recruiting experienced officers; he went to Mafeking and was accepted into the unit, with whom he served until the end of the war. The Rifles were part of a mobile force, the Divisional Scouting Corps, whose function was to round up Boer detachments and to execute Kitchener's scorched earth policy, destroying Boer farm buildings and crops, and detaining women and children in concentration camps.

=== First World War ===
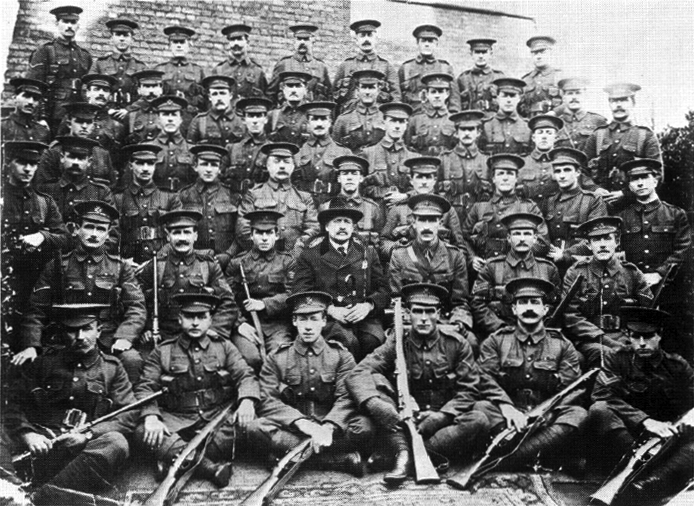
The original Rhodesian Platoon of the King's Royal Rifle Corps, at Sheerness, England in November 1914. Its commanding officer, Captain John Banks Brady, sits in the second row, third from the right.

Great Britain declared war on Germany on 4 August 1914, and as part of the British Empire, Southern Rhodesia was also now at war. The British South Africa Company (which then administered the territory) took no steps to aid recruiting for the forces, so many men paid their own fares to England to join up. A number of eligible recruits could not afford to go, so Guest, together with Captain Alwyn Knowles of the Bedfordshire Regiment, who as a reserve officer was awaiting his call-up, organised a private fund to pay their passages. When the recruits arrived in England they were enlisted by Captain (later Colonel) John Banks Brady (who was in 1934 to be elected to the Southern Rhodesian Legislative Assembly as member for Bulawayo North) to form a Rhodesian platoon in the King's Royal Rifle Corps.

Guest and Knowles were summoned to the Defence Department and told to stop recruiting. The Administration had decided to raise a regiment in Rhodesia, and Guest joined the Salisbury battalion of the 1st Rhodesian Regiment with the rank of Lieutenant. The battalion was sent to South Africa to assist in suppressing the 1914 Maritz Rebellion by Boers opposed to fighting for Britain. It was not, however, deployed against the Rebellion and when it ended the battalion was sent, with the Imperial Light Horse, to reinforce the South African troops in the South-West Africa Campaign in German South-West Africa, present-day Namibia. They landed at Lambert's Bay on Christmas morning 1914, but made no contact with the enemy until they were sent to Swakopmund.

When the campaign came to an end, the battalion returned to Salisbury. Guest then travelled to England and sought a commission, joining the South Lancashire Regiment with the rank of Lieutenant in September 1916. He was later promoted to captain. He went with his battalion to France where they were posted to the 59th Division, then in the line. The sector they occupied was not very active, but shelling and sniping from both sides were carried out fairly regularly. It was not long before Guest was wounded, and then he fell victim to an irritating and persistent skin complaint which was common in the trenches and did not respond to treatment. He was evacuated to England and after a brief period in hospital was sent to the Imperial Hydro at St Annes, where he was told that he would not be fit to return to his unit for six months.

Through a contact at the War Office, Guest had his name added to a list of officers available for special employment, and was selected to undertake a propaganda tour of the United States, delivering 160 lectures to approximately 282,000 people in total. He was then sent to France to promote the benefits of Southern Rhodesia to the large number of soldiers who had become unsettled and wished to emigrate. Guest then returned to Rhodesia with his family, who had spent most of the war in England.

Other members of the Guest family also served in the First World War. Ivor Guest, Ernest's eldest brother, was a lieutenant in the Witwatersrand Rifles in the South-West Africa Campaign. After the regiment was disbanded at the end of the campaign, he was commissioned as a machine gun officer in the Second Cape Corps for service in East Africa; he was killed in action on 6 November 1917 at the Battle of Mahiwa while checking the advance of a vastly superior enemy force. His gun crew had become casualties and he was handling the gun himself when he was killed.

Guest's two younger brothers also served in the Transvaal Scottish. The elder of them, Duke, was later commissioned in the South African Scottish and served in France. He was gassed and after a long stay in hospital was declared unfit for further service and remained in England until the end of the war.

== Legal career ==
=== Admission to the Rhodesian High Court ===
At the start of the Second Boer War, Guest had left school without any educational qualifications. Nevertheless, he managed to start his legal career when a Klerksdorp solicitor, Maurice Rood, offered him a job drawing up claims for compensation by farmers whose properties had been destroyed or damaged by the British forces. The claims were to be submitted to the "Compensation Committee", on which Guest's father served. When the committee ceased to function Rood suggested that Guest become articled to him.

The need to matriculate was an obstacle. He used a family connection with St. Andrew's College, Grahamstown, to attend as a day boy and passed his matriculation. He duly applied to the Supreme Court for admission as an attorney in the Transvaal, was accepted and took the oath. He was offered a post with the leading firm of attorneys in Klerksdorp, but a clause in his articles prohibited Guest from practising in competition with Rood's firm for some years without the latter's permission.

Guest became acquainted with Fred Hopley, who had recently been practising in Bulawayo. He informed Guest that a solicitor in Bulawayo, Louis Champion, wanted someone to take over his practice for six months while he was away on a shooting trip. Guest's application was accepted by return of post and he was asked to report early in July 1910. Champion's practice, as Deputy Sheriff, consisted mainly of debt-collecting and lending money to doubtful borrowers at a high rate of interest.

Guest prepared his petition for admission to the Southern Rhodesian High Court and briefed counsel to represent him before the Chief Justice, Sir Joseph Vintcent. The Judge dispensed with the requirement to apply first for admission in the Cape Colony and admitted him as an attorney of the High Court of Southern Rhodesia.

A few days after Guest's arrival a young man arrived to practise in Bulawayo as an advocate, Robert Hudson. So began a friendship that was to endure for the rest of Hudson's life and through many vicissitudes – in the legal profession, on active service in the First World War, and during the years when they were both members of the Cabinet. Hudson, who for some years was Minister of Justice, became Chief Justice of Southern Rhodesia.

=== Coghlan, Welsh & Guest ===
Bryce Hendrie, whose office was next door to Louis Champion's, had been appointed commanding officer of the Rhodesian contingent to attend the coronation of King George V on 22 June 1911. Before his departure to England, he offered Guest the management of his practice during his absence. Hendrie's brother was an estate agent and put all his property transfers through the firm, so Guest gained much valuable experience, especially in conveyancing, through a number of cases in the High Court, in the Magistrate's Court and in the Court of the Mining Commissioner.

Guest came up against Sir Charles Coghlan, the senior partner of Coghlan and Welsh, in a case before the Court of the Mining Commissioner. Coghlan represented a mining company, which had pegged some gold claims on Guest's client's farm. The Commissioner gave judgment in favour of Guest, who had been instructed to oppose their registration. Following this case, although initially irritated by Guest, Coghlan invited him to join his firm in Salisbury, which Guest did in January 1912. The Salisbury office had been opened by Bernard Tancred. His passing away provided the opportunity for Guest to join the firm as a partner. For a while, the firm was known as Coghlan, Welsh, Townsend and Guest, when Townsend, one of the 1820 Settlers in the Eastern Cape, joined the firm in Salisbury. It reverted to Coghlan, Welsh and Guest, when Townsend died a little time later.

On his return to Rhodesia after the First World War, Guest took over the Salisbury practice from Sir Charles, who returned to Bulawayo.

== Politics ==
=== Early career ===
After the First World War, Guest became involved in municipal affairs. He served on a committee to help returning soldiers adjust to civilian life. He was elected to the Salisbury Town Council, and during his second term was appointed Deputy Mayor. For the best part of a year, he acted as Mayor during the Mayor's absence in the United States.

Guest was one of several prominent citizens who were members of the Rhodesian Union Association, advocating joining the Union of South Africa in the 1922 government referendum; the alternative option was "responsible government", under which Southern Rhodesia would become a self-governing colony of Britain in its own right. The electorate returned a vote for the latter proposition, and in October 1923 Coghlan became the first Premier of Southern Rhodesia. Although Guest was on the opposite side to Coghlan the statesman was impressed by his capabilities, and when he drew up a list of those he would like to see stand for election to the next Legislative Assembly, just before his death, he put Guest's name at the head of it. Guest first stood for Charter, representing the Rhodesia Party at the 1928 elections. Despite the constituency being largely Afrikaans, he won the seat, defeating the incumbent Charles Edward Gilfillan of the Progressive Party with a majority of 283 votes to 211. He held Charter until 1946, being re-elected in 1933, 1934 (unopposed) and 1939. At the 1946 elections he stood for Salisbury Gardens and won, remaining there until his retirement from politics in 1948.

=== Cabinet Minister ===
At the 1933 elections, the Rhodesia Party was defeated by the Reform Party of Godfrey Huggins. Guest was a key advocate of accepting the merger of the two parties under the new name of the United Party and Huggins appointed him to his Cabinet in 1938.

Guest was Minister of Mines and Public Works, from 1 June 1938 to 1 February 1944. The Electricity Supply Commission came under his portfolio. It had responsibility for ensuring that the generation of electricity kept pace with the ever·growing needs of mining, farming and secondary industry. When Guest became Minister, the commission was constructing a thermal power station at Umsweswe, but kept running short of money. The Minister of Finance, Jacob Smit, was reluctant to grant further funds but would support a hydro-electric scheme. Guest proposed Kariba as a source of hydro-electric power and Smit provided the money for further investigation. Guest arranged with a civil engineer named Jeffares, who had earlier surveyed the route of the proposed Sinoia/Kafue railway and knew the country around Kariba, to survey the area, select a site for a power station and submit a report. When he eventually did so, Guest appointed a committee of engineers to examine the proposal. They reported favourably but did not recommend that the scheme be proceeded with immediately. Nor was the Cabinet particularly impressed, and the idea was strongly criticised by the Opposition in Parliament. The outbreak of the Second World War caused the project to be shelved but after the war the project was revived as a joint scheme to serve the two Rhodesias. The eventual construction of Kariba Dam was of enormous value to the development of both Rhodesia and the Zambian Copperbelt, and led to the creation of what was at the time the largest manmade lake in Africa south of the Sahara.

=== Second World War ===
The Hon. E Lucas Guest, Minister of Air for Rhodesia, with Air Comdre. C W Meredith AFC, in command of the Air Training Group (1941)

At a special sitting of Parliament on 28 August 1939, Rhodesia determined to stand by Great Britain in the event that war should break out, as was expected. Of a white population of just 65,000, only 10,000 were fit and available for active service. It was decided not to create a full Rhodesian formation: if it were wiped out, the colony's future prosperity would be put at risk. Instead mostly small groups of Rhodesians were distributed throughout the British Army, the Royal Navy, and the Royal Air Force. In the Defence Report of 1939, it was stated that forces would be trained and organised not only for internal security and defence but also to defend British interests in service outside its borders.

==== Empire Air Training Scheme ====
As early as 1936, an air training scheme was inaugurated at Cranborne, near Salisbury, where the civilian flying school instructed pilots. Facilities were later extended to Bulawayo. In August 1937, Squadron Leader G.A Powell and Flight Lieutenant V.E. Maxwell were seconded from the RAF to oversee service training. In September 1939, the Rhodesian Air Training Group, under the direction of Air Vice Marshal (later Sir) Charles Warburton Meredith, took in 500 recruits at Cranborne. An offer was made to British Air Ministry to run a flying school and to train personnel to man three squadrons, which was duly accepted.

The Southern Rhodesian Air Force effectively ceased to exist after its last training course was completed on 6 April 1940. Its three squadrons became 44, 237 and 266 Squadrons, Royal Air Force, bearing the name of Rhodesia. The Rhodesian Air Training Group invited the public to submit design proposals for the Squadrons' crests.

===== Rhodesia Air Training Group =====
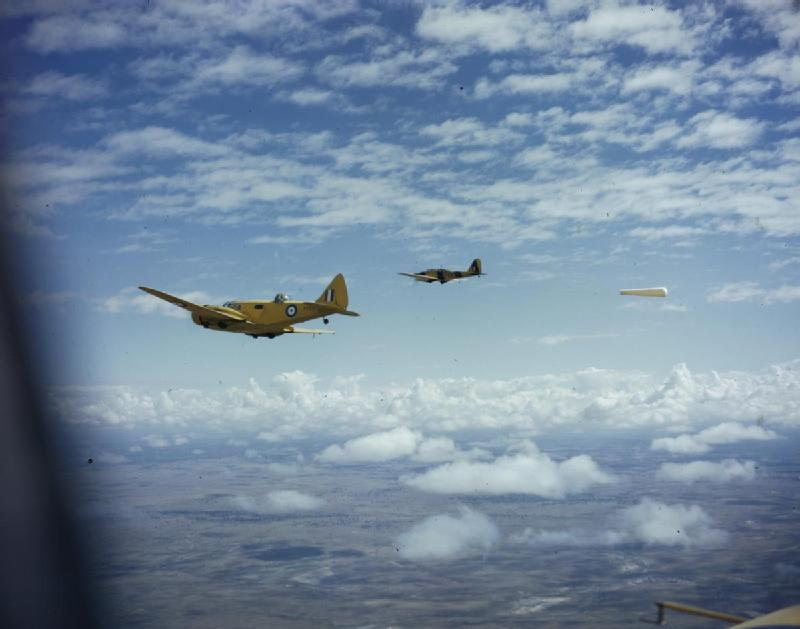
Allied pilots training over Southern Rhodesia in 1943

Meanwhile, preparations were underway in Rhodesia to expand facilities for the training of pilots. In January 1940 the government announced the creation of a Department of Air, completely separate from that of Defence. Guest was appointed Minister of Air, a post he held from 28 March 1940 to 6 May 1946. He inaugurated and administered what became the second largest Empire Air Training Scheme, beginning with the establishment of three units at Salisbury, Bulawayo and Gwelo, each comprising a preliminary and an advanced training school.

Rhodesia was the last of the Commonwealth countries to enter the Empire Air Training Scheme and the first to turn out fully qualified pilots. No.25 Elementary Flying Training School at Belvedere Air Station, Salisbury, was the first school to be opened, on 25 May 1940 by Air Chief Marshal Sir Robert Brooke-Popham. It was followed by a Service School at Cranborne. In Bulawayo, an Elementary School was established at Sauerdale, although due to the unsuitability of the ground surface, it was moved to RAF Induna, with a Service School at RAF Heany. Gwelo had an Elementary School at RAF Guinea Fowl and a Service School at Thornhill. The Elementary Schools were equipped with Tiger Moths and the Service Schools, single-engine Harvards and twin-engine Airspeed Oxfords. At RAF Moffat, the first gunners passed out in September 1941 from the only Bombing and Gunnery School in Southern Rhodesia.

The trainees came mainly from Britain, but also from Australia, Canada, South Africa, New Zealand, USA, Yugoslavia, Greece, France, Poland, Czechoslovakia, Kenya, Uganda, Tanganyika, Fiji and Malta. In total 8,500 British aircrew were trained in Southern Rhodesia during the War.

===== 237 (Rhodesia) Squadron =====
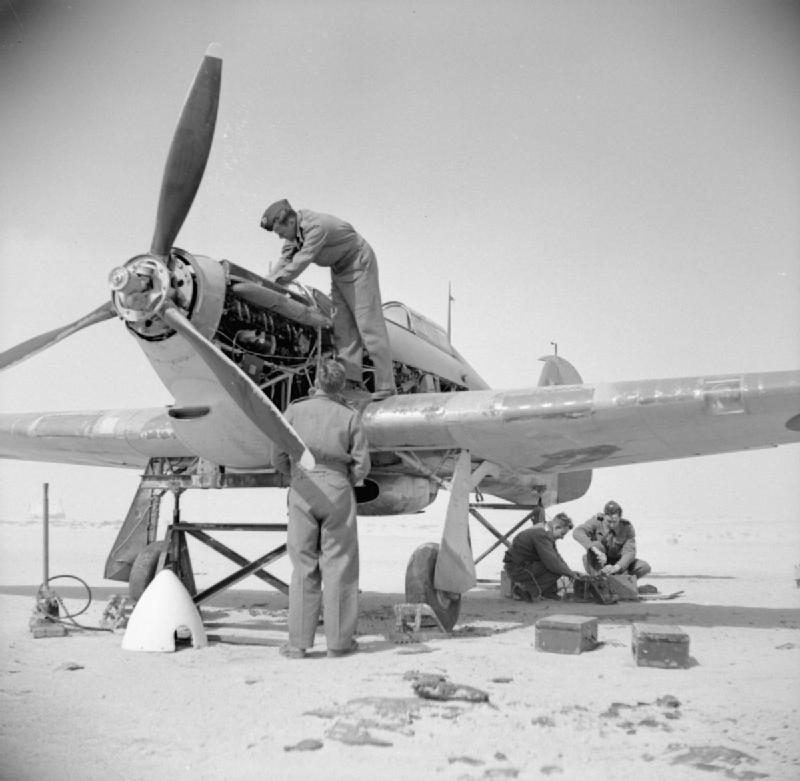
Fitters working on the engine of a Hawker Hurricane of No 237 (Rhodesian) Squadron in Iran.

No. 1 Squadron, Southern Rhodesian Air Force, was among the units posted to East African Force in Kenya in September 1939 to undertake the role of army co-operation, including reconnaissance and air-photography work, as well as dive-bombing operations and ground-strafing, and conducting artillery shoots. On 22 April 1940, the squadron was renamed No. 237 (Rhodesia) Squadron, Royal Air Force and took the Latin motto Primum Agmen in Caelo (The Vanguard in the Sky), being Rhodesia's first in the field.

In September 1940, 237 Squadron was relieved by units of the South African Air Force and redeployed in Sudan, where the Operations Record for the last three months of 1940 showed it was involved in reconnaissance, dive-bombing and pamphlet-dropping. At the start of 1941, the Squadron was re-equipped with less antiquated aircraft. The Hardys were replaced by Westland Lysander II army co-operation planes as well as Gloster Gladiator fighter biplanes. 237 Squadron moved out of East Africa after the defeat of the Italians in May 1941. They had seen active service in Kenya, Sudan, Eritrea and Abyssinia. The Squadron was involved in the Western Desert campaign against Rommel. After a lull in the summer of 1941, it took heavy casualties in the closing months inflicted on it by Me109F and Macchis. It was withdrawn to the Canal Zone in February 1942 after five months in the Western Desert.

The Squadron's crest was presented to it by Air Chief Marshal Sir Arthur Tedder on 30 March 1942.

===== 266 (Rhodesia) Squadron =====
266 Squadron, RAF, was formed at RAF Sutton Bridge on 30 October 1939. The majority of the Squadron were Rhodesian, with the exception of a few groundstaff and the commanding officer. Equipped with Spitfires, it was the Rhodesian fighter squadron and it took as its motto a Sindebele word Hlabezulu (Stabber of Skies). It first went into action over Dunkirk on 2 June 1940. By June 1941, the Squadron, led by Sqn Ldr T.B. de la P. Beresford, was stationed at RAF Wittering, near Peterborough. Its duties included patrolling, escorting convoys, offensive sweeps of northern France and the Belgian and Dutch coasts, as well as escorting bombing raids over France and the Rhine. In January 1942, the Squadron received Hawker Typhoons and later in the month moved to Duxford.

===== 44 (Rhodesia) Squadron =====
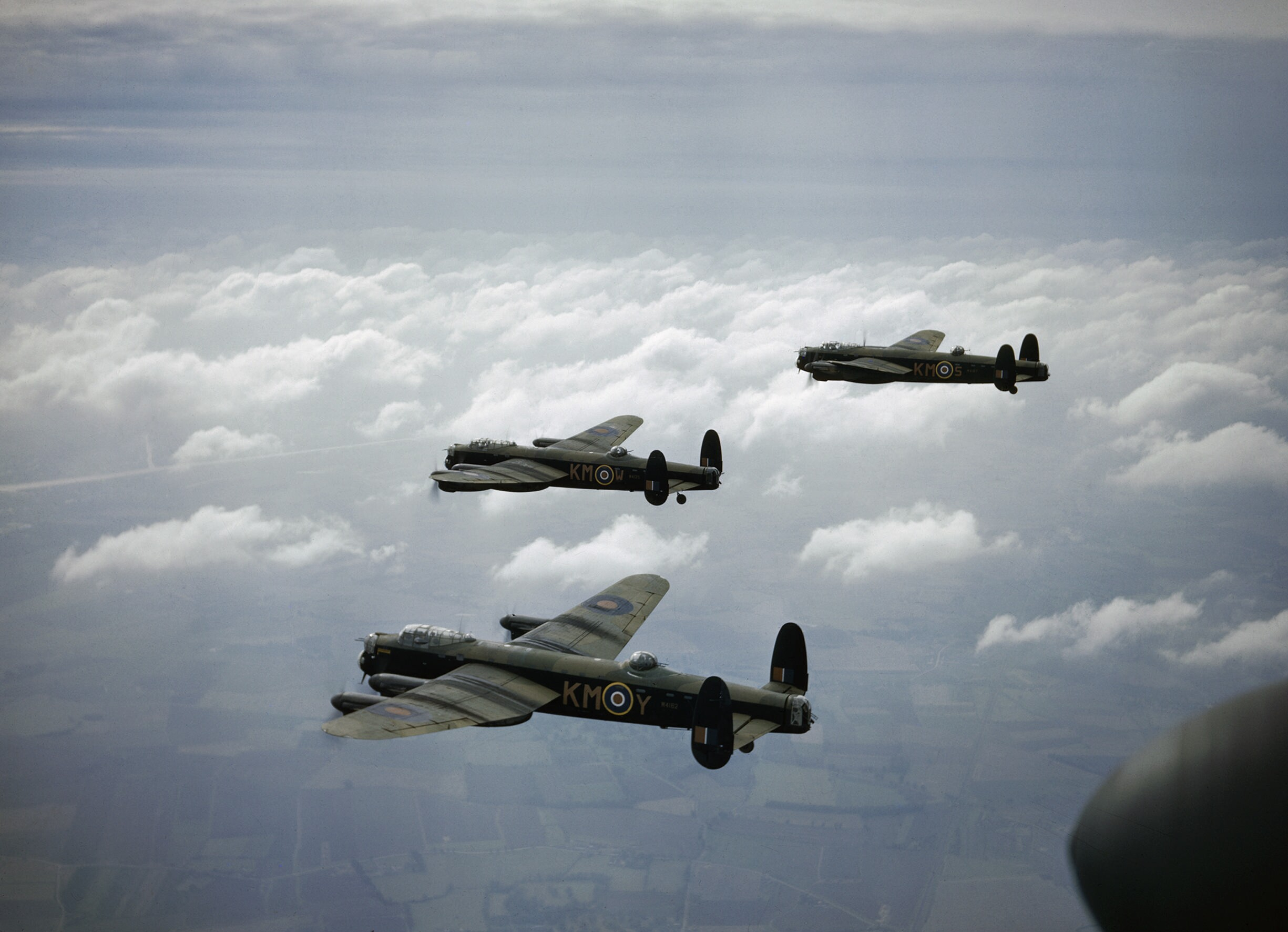
No.44 Sqn Avro Lancaster B.I (1942)

44 Squadron, RAF, stationed at Waddington, south of Lincoln, was renamed 44 (Rhodesia) Squadron in September 1941, and took as its motto Fulmina Regis Justa (The King's thunderbolts are righteous). The bomber Squadron, equipped with Hampdens, took part in raids on Berlin and many other targets, as well as mine-laying in sea traffic lanes.

It was also in September 1941 that the Squadron received the proto-type Lancaster bomber, the first squadron of the RAF to receive the new aircraft. On a visit to the Squadron in December, Guest and Meredith were taken on a flight in the new plane. Although the order was given in December to cease operations in the Hampdens, it was not until 3 March 1942 that the Lancaster was put on active service on its first battle mission for the entire RAF. The Squadron, with its Lancasters, was given key targets to bomb: on 17 April 1942, six Lancasters from 44 Squadron alongside six from 97 Squadron, bombed the MAN diesel engine factory, which produced more than half of the German U-boats, as well as engines for ships, tanks and transport vehicles. The success – at a cost of five planes and crew to 44 Squadron – earned the thanks of the Prime Minister himself. The Squadron was further involved in the obliteration of Rostock on 8 May and took part in the 1,000-aircraft attack on Cologne on 30 May.

=== After the war ===
From 1944, Guest was Leader of the House until he retired from political office in 1948. He retained his wartime role as Air Minister and Rhodesia capitalised on her experience to form her own highly efficient Air Force. He also tackled the problem of young airmen returning to civilian life, training aircrews for civilian duty as well as helping young men complete their academic education. He continued as Minister of Defence and Air from 7 June 1946 to 15 September 1948. He chaired the South African Air Transport Council in its deliberations in 1947 regarding air traffic control and the establishment of control centres at Nairobi, Salisbury and Johannesburg, as well as communications and the future needs of air transport in southern Africa.

During this time, he was also Minister of Internal Affairs from 1944 to 1946 and briefly Minister of Finance from 7 May 1946 to 26 September 1946. He acted as Prime Minister at various times in 1947 and 1948 during the absence of Huggins and acted for other ministers on a number of occasions.

Although he had retired from political office, Guest continued to be active in public life, for example in organising the 1953 Rhodes Centenary Exhibition in Southern Rhodesia.

== Family ==
Ernest Guest married Edith May, daughter of Thomas Jones of Singapore. The couple met in Johannesburg, where she had been brought up by an uncle. They had two daughters and twin sons. Both their sons were killed in action in the Second World War.

His second daughter, Maureen Edith Pilling, enlisted in the Women's Auxiliary Air Force (WAAF) soon after the outbreak of the Second World War and was eventually promoted to Flight Officer in July 1944. Posted to Cairo and Palestine, she married a Squadron Leader in the RAF and then remained in Cairo until the end of the war.

Ernest Melville Charles Guest (1920–4 October 1943) was commissioned as Pilot Officer in the Royal Air Force on 9 October 1939 and eventually promoted to Flight Lieutenant on 9 October 1941. He was initially posted to 206 Squadron in England, flying anti-submarine missions, then to 200 Squadron in West Africa before being transferred to 61 Air School at George in the Western Cape as a navigation instructor. He transferred back to England and soon after was killed in action. A fortnight later, his son, Melville Richard John Guest, was born. He received three Mentions in Despatches and was awarded the Distinguished Flying Cross in 1942.

John Desmond Thomas Guest (1920–21 November 1941), Melville's twin brother, turned down a Rhodes Scholarship at Trinity College, Oxford as the war broke out and enlisted in England instead, commissioned Second Lieutenant in the King's Royal Rifle Corps in June 1940. He served in the Abyssinian campaign and then in the Western Desert, where he was killed in a bayonet charge at the Battle of Sidi Rezegh on 21 November 1941.

== Honours ==
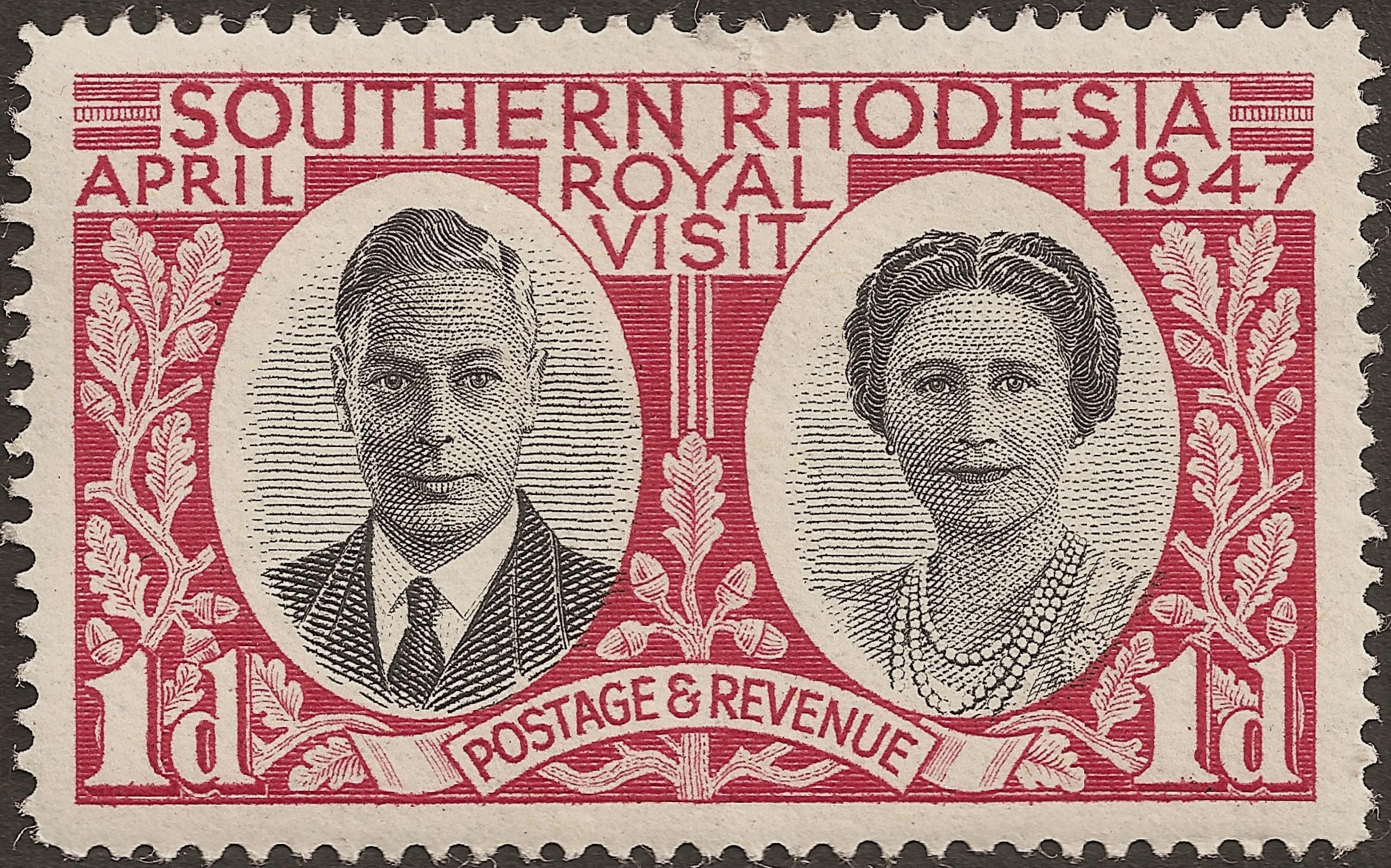
Stamp of Southern Rhodesia of 1947, issued for the royal visit in Southern Africa, in April 1947. This 1 penny red figured King George VI and Queen Elizabeth

Guest was appointed and Officer of the Order of the British Empire (OBE) in the 1938 Birthday Honours and promoted to a Knight Commander of the Order of the British Empire (KBE; Civil Division) in the 1944 New Year Honours List "for public services, especially in inauguration of Empire Air Training Scheme." He was also appointed a Commander of the Royal Victorian Order (CVO) by King George VI during the Royal Family's visit to Rhodesia in April 1947, and a Companion of the Order of St Michael and St George (CMG) in the 1949 New Year Honours List. Guest was also awarded the Order of the White Eagle. He was granted the right in December 1948 to retain the title Honourable, having served for more than three years as a member of the Executive Council of Southern Rhodesia.

In 1953, the University of the Witwatersrand, South Africa, recognised him with an Honorary Degree of a Doctor of Laws (HonLLD).

=== Medals and awards ===
Knight Commander of the Order of the British Empire (KBE; Civil Division)	NY 1944
Officer of the Order of the British Empire (OBE; Military Division)	KB 1938
Companion of the Order of St Michael and St George (CMG)	NY 1949
Commander of the Royal Victorian Order (CVO)	RV 1947
Queen's South Africa Medal	1899 (3 clasps)
King's South Africa Medal	1902 (2 clasps)
1914–15 Star	1919
British War Medal	1919
Victory Medal	MID Palm 1919
King George V Silver Jubilee Medal	1935
King George VI Coronation Medal	1937
Queen Elizabeth II Coronation Medal	1953
Knight's Cross (5th Class) of the Order of the White Eagle	Serbia

== Death ==
Sir Ernest Lucas Guest died on 20 September 1972 at the age of 90, in Salisbury, Rhodesia. A special sitting of both divisions of the High Court of Rhodesia was convened to pay tribute to Guest on 27 September 1972. In Parliament, a motion of condolence was moved on 14 November 1972 by Jack Howman, Minister of Foreign Affairs, Defence and Public Services – and a partner in Coghlan, Welsh & Guest – as Acting Leader of the House.

Southern Rhodesian Legislative Assembly
Preceded by Charles Edward Gilfillan	Member of Parliament for Charter; 1928 – 1946	Succeeded by Jacob Letterstedt Smit
Preceded by Sir Percival Fynn	Member of Parliament for Salisbury Gardens; 1946 – 1948	Succeeded by Noel St. Quinton
Political offices
Preceded by Robert Tredgold	Minister of Mines and Public Works; 1938 – 1944	Succeeded by Leslie Fereday as Minister of Mines
Preceded by Robert Tredgold	Minister of Mines and Public Works; 1938 – 1944	Succeeded by Harry Bertin as Minister of Public Works and Roads
Preceded by Robert Tredgold as Minister of Justice, Defence and Air	Minister of Air; 1940 – 1946	Succeeded by Himself as Minister of Defence and Air
Preceded by Harry Davies	Minister of Internal Affairs; 1944 – 1946	Succeeded by Hugh Beadle
Preceded by William Henry Ralston as Minister of Defence	Minister of Defence and Air; 1946 – 1948	Succeeded by Sir Godfrey Huggins as Minister of Defence
Preceded by Himself as Minister of Air	Minister of Defence and Air; 1946 – 1948	Succeeded by Sir Godfrey Huggins as Minister of Defence
Preceded by Max Danziger as Minister of Finance and Commerce	Minister of Finance; 1946	Succeeded by Edgar Whitehead
