= Robert Tredgold =

Rhodesian barrister, judge, and politician (1899–1977)

Sir Robert Clarkson Tredgold, KCMG, PC (2 June 1899 – 8 April 1977), was a Rhodesian barrister, judge and politician.

== Early life ==
He was born in Bulawayo to Clarkson Henry Tredgold, the Attorney-General of Southern Rhodesia, and Emily Ruth (née Moffat), and was the grandson of the missionary John Moffat. He attended first Prince Edward School and then South African College Schools in Cape Town, South Africa. He was a Rhodes Scholar and read law at Hertford College.

In 1923 he was called to the bar at Inner Temple and then returned to Rhodesia to practice law.

== Political career ==
In the 1934 general election, Tredgold was elected to the Southern Rhodesian Legislative Assembly seat of Insiza for the United Rhodesia Party of Godfrey Huggins. He rose quickly, becoming Minister of Justice and Defence in 1936, Minister of Justice, Defence and Air (1940–1943), Minister of Mines and Public Works (1938), and Minister of Native Affairs (1942–1943).

== Later life and career ==
Tredgold resigned his offices and Legislative Assembly seat in 1943, to take up an appointment as a Judge of the High Court of Southern Rhodesia. In 1950, on the retirement of Chief Justice Sir Robert Hudson, he was appointed to succeed him as chief justice of the court. Serving until 1955, in this capacity he served as acting Governor of Southern Rhodesia from 21 November 1953 to 26 November 1954. In 1953, the University of the Witwatersrand, Johannesburg, awarded Tredgold the honorary degree of a Doctor of Laws (Hon LLD).

Tredgold was appointed the first Chief Justice of the Federal Supreme Court of the Federation of Rhodesia and Nyasaland in 1955. In this capacity he served as acting Governor of Southern Rhodesia from 21 November 1953 to 26 November 1954, and as acting Governor-General of the Federation of Rhodesia and Nyasaland from 24 January 1957 to February 1957. In November 1960 he resigned in protest from his Central African Federation position, criticising the actions authorised by Sir Edgar Whitehead to suppress black nationalist opposition to the Federation in Nyasaland and Northern Rhodesia, through the introduction of the Law and Order (Maintenance) Bill. Tredgold noted that the bill "outrages almost every basic human right and is, in addition, an unwarranted invasion by the executive of the sphere of the courts. These are the custodians of individual rights and are my special responsibility."

Sir Robert Tredgold was named a Privy Counsellor in 1957. He retired to Marandellas with his second wife, Lady Margaret Tredgold, where he died on 8 April 1977 at 78. He had published the book The Rhodesia That Was My Life in 1968.

== Family ==
A widower in 1974, Tredgold married his second wife, Mrs. Margaret Helen Phear (née Baines; 1910-2012), a widow and mother of three children, originally from Aliwal North, South Africa. Together the couple researched the folklore of Rhodesia (formerly Southern Rhodesia) and published children's books based on them. They also researched edible plants, culminating in Food Plants of Zimbabwe, which she completed after his death and published in 1986.

A devout Roman Catholic, Lady Tredgold died in 2012 at age 102 in England, where she had relocated in 2004 due to the Mugabe government's policies. She was predeceased by one son, and survived by a second son and her daughter, with whom she lived in England.

== Honours ==
Robert Clarkson Tredgold was appointed Companion of the Order of St Michael and St George in the 1943 New Year Honours. He was appointed a Knight Bachelor in the 1951 New Year Honours. He was appointed a KCMG in 1955.

Southern Rhodesian Legislative Assembly
Preceded by Stephen O'Keeffe	Member of Parliament for Insiza; 1934 – 1943	Succeeded by Leslie Thomas Smith
Political offices
Preceded by Vernon Arthur Lewis as Minister of Justice and Defence	Minister of Justice; 1936 – 1940	Succeeded by Himself as Minister of Justice, Defence and Air
Preceded by Vernon Arthur Lewis as Minister of Justice and Defence	Minister of Defence; 1936 – 1940	Succeeded by Himself as Minister of Justice, Defence and Air
Preceded by Himself as Minister of Justice and Minister of Defence	Minister of Justice, Defence and Air; 1940	Succeeded by Himself as Minister of Justice and Defence
Preceded by Himself as Minister of Justice and Minister of Defence	Minister of Justice, Defence and Air; 1940	Succeeded by Ernest Lucas Guest as Minister of Air
Preceded by Himself as Minister of Justice, Defence and Air	Minister of Justice and Defence; 1940 – 1943	Succeeded by Harry Bertin as Minister of Justice
Preceded by Himself as Minister of Justice, Defence and Air	Minister of Justice and Defence; 1940 – 1943	Succeeded by Sir Godfrey Huggins as Minister of Defence
Preceded by William Sydney Senior	Minister of Mines and Public Works; 1938	Succeeded by Ernest Lucas Guest
Preceded by Sir Godfrey Huggins	Minister of Native Affairs; 1942 – 1943	Succeeded by Harry Bertin
Legal offices
Preceded by Vernon Lewis (acting)	Chief Justice of Southern Rhodesia; 1950 – 1955	Succeeded by Sir John Murray
New title	Chief Justice of the Federation of Rhodesia and Nyasaland; 1955 – 1960	Succeeded by Sir John Clayden
Government offices
Preceded by Sir John Kennedy	Governor of Southern Rhodesia; Acting; 1953 – 1954	Succeeded by Sir Peveril William-Powlett
Preceded by Lord Llewellin	Governor-General of the Federation of Rhodesia and Nyasaland; Acting; 1957	Succeeded by Sir William Lindsay Murphy (acting)
