= 1928 Southern Rhodesian general election =

- 19 September 1928

All 30 seats in the Legislative Assembly 16 seats needed for a majority
	First party	Second party	Third party
Leader	Howard Moffat
Party	Rhodesia Party	Progressive	Labour
Leader since	2 September 1927
Leader's seat	Victoria
Last election	26 seats	–	0 seats
Seats won	22	4	3
Seat change	▼4	New	▲3
Popular vote	11,177	6,358	2,474
Percentage	52.76%	30.01%	11.68%
Premier before election
Howard Moffat
Rhodesia Party
Subsequent Premier
Howard Moffat
Rhodesia Party

General elections were held in Southern Rhodesia on 19 September 1928, the second elections to the Legislative Assembly. The Rhodesia Party, which had won an overwhelming victory in the previous elections in 1924, was re-elected with a slightly reduced majority.

== Electoral system ==
The Electoral Act, 1928 added a procedure whereby electors could vote by post, but otherwise retained the same system as used previously.

At this election the franchise was codified for the first time by the Electoral Act, 1928. The basis for the act was a consolidation of the previous regulations created by Order in Council, but the opportunity was taken by the Legislative Assembly to change some of the regulations which they had come to dislike. The principal change in the franchise was to restrict registration to British subjects only, whether by birth or naturalisation; previously, resident aliens could take an oath of allegiance to qualify themselves.

A change was also made to the literacy requirements for voters, where the test of writing fifty words of English at the dictation of the registering officer was dropped and the would-be voter merely had to be able to fill in the form in their own handwriting. The financial means qualification was the subject of a minor wording change, whereby the word "income" was added as an alternative to salary or wages.

Having previously elected the Legislative Assembly by means of 15 electoral districts each returning two members, in 1927 a Delimitation Board was established to recommend new districts. The Board intended to recommend 30 single-member districts, but found this to be impractical given the strong population growth around Salisbury and Bulawayo and therefore recommended 22 single-member districts and four two-member districts. The retention of two-member districts was controversial. The Board found its work hampered by the inaccuracy of the electoral roll, and as a result registration procedure was tightened up in the Electoral Act, 1928.

== Political parties ==
The development of political parties had advanced since the colony was granted self-government. The Progressive Party, an opposition group opposed to monopolies and advocating more development of Matabeleland, had been formed in June 1927 from a group of independent members, and was able to nominate 22 candidates for the 30 seats. The Rhodesia Labour Party had increased its strength in the towns.

Also in 1927 the Country Party had been formed by dissident farmers in the Rhodesian Agricultural Union.

== Results ==
Party	Votes	%	Seats	+/–
Rhodesia Party	11,177	52.76	22	–4
Progressive Party	6,358	30.01	4	New
Rhodesia Labour Party	2,474	11.68	3	+3
Country Party	662	3.12	0	New
Independents	514	2.43	1	–3
Total	21,185	100.00	30	0
Registered voters/turnout	25,832	–		
Source: Willson

=== By constituency ===
- CP – Centre Party
- Lab – Rhodesia Labour Party
- PP – Progressive Party
- RP – Rhodesia Party

Constituency Electorate and turnout	Candidate	Party	Votes
BULAWAYO CENTRAL; Two members 2,138 (48.0%)	†James Cowden	RP	626
BULAWAYO CENTRAL; Two members 2,138 (48.0%)	Donald MacGillivray	RP	615
BULAWAYO CENTRAL; Two members 2,138 (48.0%)	†Francis Leslie Hadfield	PP	442
BULAWAYO CENTRAL; Two members 2,138 (48.0%)	Gilbert Samuel Hough	PP	368
BULAWAYO NORTH; Two members 1,915 (47.5%)	†Robert James Hudson	RP	774
BULAWAYO NORTH; Two members 1,915 (47.5%)	†Allan Ross Welsh	RP	711
BULAWAYO NORTH; Two members 1,915 (47.5%)	Ernest Richard Davies	PP	334
BULAWAYO SOUTH; 1,110 (62.3%)	Harry Herbert Davies	Lab	440
BULAWAYO SOUTH; 1,110 (62.3%)	George Johnson	RP	252
CHARTER; 791 (62.5%)	Ernest Lucas Guest	RP	283
CHARTER; 791 (62.5%)	†Charles Edward Gilfillan	PP	211
EASTERN; 842 (67.1%)	†John Louis Martin	Ind	344
EASTERN; 842 (67.1%)	†Ethel Tawse Jollie	RP	221
GATOOMA; 900 (68.8%)	George Munro	RP	440
GATOOMA; 900 (68.8%)	Sir Ernest William Sanders Montagu	PP	260
GATOOMA; 900 (68.8%)	William Martin	Lab	93
GWANDA; 671 (70.0%)	†George Mitchell	RP	173
GWANDA; 671 (70.0%)	Herbert Stephen Henderson	Ind RP	170
GWANDA; 671 (70.0%)	Daniel Judson	PP	127
GWELO; 902 (68.2%)	†Max Danziger	RP	412
GWELO; 902 (68.2%)	John William Watkinson	PP	203
HARTLEY; 744 (58.7%)	Roger Edward Downes	PP	250
HARTLEY; 744 (58.7%)	†Osmond Charteris Du Port	RP	187
INSIZA; 736 (64.3%)	Stephen Martin Lanigan O'Keeffe	PP	255
INSIZA; 736 (64.3%)	Joseph Ritchie Stewart	RP	218
INYATI; 717 (59.8%)	Charles Spearman Jobling	RP	252
INYATI; 717 (59.8%)	†Frederic Phillip Mennell	PP	177
LOMAGUNDI; 881 (55.3%)	†James Murdoch Eaton	RP	272
LOMAGUNDI; 881 (55.3%)	Thomas William Williamson	CP	215
MARANDELLAS; 793 (63.8%)	Luke Lot Green	RP	266
MARANDELLAS; 793 (63.8%)	Eric Arthur Nobbs	PP	167
MARANDELLAS; 793 (63.8%)	John Mitchell Moubray	CP	73
MATOPO; 749 (71.6%)	†Robert Alexander Fletcher	RP	385
MATOPO; 749 (71.6%)	Edmund Gilchrist Wrightson	PP	151
MAZOE; 775 (68.3%)	†John Wallace Downie	RP	345
MAZOE; 775 (68.3%)	Milton Evan Cleveland	CP	184
QUE QUE; 844 (70.6%)	†Arthur James Taylor	RP	327
QUE QUE; 844 (70.6%)	Alexander Louis Wynand Koch Worsthorne	PP	269
RAYLTON; 906 (64.6%)	Lawrence John Walter Keller	Lab	306
RAYLTON; 906 (64.6%)	†Henry Robert Barbour	RP	279
SALISBURY DISTRICT; 968 (61.2%)	†William Muter Leggate	RP	268
SALISBURY DISTRICT; 968 (61.2%)	John Arnold Edmonds	CP	190
SALISBURY DISTRICT; 968 (61.2%)	Edward Cuthbert Nangle	PP	134
SALISBURY NORTH; Two members 2,205 (64.0%)	†Godfrey Martin Huggins	RP	821
SALISBURY NORTH; Two members 2,205 (64.0%)	†Percival Donald Leslie Fynn	RP	771
SALISBURY NORTH; Two members 2,205 (64.0%)	†Frank William Frederick Johnson	PP	627
SALISBURY NORTH; Two members 2,205 (64.0%)	Vernon Arthur Lewis	PP	601
SALISBURY SOUTH; Two members 2,743 (63.1%)	†Harry Bertin	PP	639
SALISBURY SOUTH; Two members 2,743 (63.1%)	Gordon Ross Milne	RP	629
SALISBURY SOUTH; Two members 2,743 (63.1%)	Henry Fulton	RP	616
SALISBURY SOUTH; Two members 2,743 (63.1%)	John William Dunlop	Lab	600
SALISBURY SOUTH; Two members 2,743 (63.1%)	Frederick Eyles	Lab	505
SALISBURY SOUTH; Two members 2,743 (63.1%)	Walter Hill	PP	473
SELUKWE; 806 (67.6%)	†Robert Dunipace Gilchrist	PP	300
SELUKWE; 806 (67.6%)	James Baillie Macdonald	RP	245
SHAMVA; 473 (76.5%)	Mark Douglas Claxton	RP	259
SHAMVA; 473 (76.5%)	Trevor Fletcher	PP	103
UMTALI NORTH; 707 (76.0%)	†Charles Eickhoff	RP	292
UMTALI NORTH; 707 (76.0%)	Alexander Tulloch	PP	137
UMTALI NORTH; 707 (76.0%)	William Harrison	Lab	108
UMTALI SOUTH; 741 (71.9%)	Jonathan Hunter Malcolm	Lab	253
UMTALI SOUTH; 741 (71.9%)	Oswald Trevor Baker	RP	150
UMTALI SOUTH; 741 (71.9%)	Robert Chaloner Critchley Long	PP	130
VICTORIA; 797	†Howard Unwin Moffat	RP	unopposed
WANKIE; 775 (55.6%)	†Alexander Robert Thomson	RP	262
WANKIE; 775 (55.6%)	George Francis Scougal	Lab	169

== Changes during the Assembly ==
=== Mazoe ===
John Wallace Downie gave up his seat on 28 October 1930 on his appointment as High Commissioner of Southern Rhodesia in London, precipitating a byelection in his electoral district which was held on 5 December 1930.

Constituency	Candidate	Party	Votes
MAZOE	Edward Walter Lionel Noaks	Ind	361
MAZOE	Frank Smith	Reform Party	98
MAZOE	Cyril Allen	RP	63

=== Salisbury South ===
Due to the resignation of Gordon Ross Milne who was in ill health, a byelection in this electoral district was held on 13 March 1931.

Constituency	Candidate	Party	Votes
SALISBURY SOUTH	Jacob Hendrik Smit	Reform Party	564
SALISBURY SOUTH	Alexander Louis Wynand Koch Worsthorne	Lab	526
SALISBURY SOUTH	Guy Harcourt Peall	RP	310
SALISBURY SOUTH	Henry Fulton	PP	168

=== Gwelo ===
Max Danziger left the Rhodesia Party on 4 June 1931 and simultaneously decided to vacate his seat to test the opinion of his electors. The result of the election was:

Constituency	Candidate	Party	Votes
GWELO	Max Danziger	Ind	unopposed

=== Party changes ===
In October 1929 the Progressive Party merged with the Country Party to form the Reform Party.
