= Harry Davies (politician) =

Southern Rhodesian politician (1878–1957)

Leader of the Opposition in Southern Rhodesia
- In office 1934–1940
- Preceded by: Percy Finn
- Succeeded by: Donald MacIntyre

Minister of Internal Affairs
- In office 1939–1944
- Prime Minister: Godfrey Huggins
- Preceded by: Percival Fynn
- Succeeded by: Ernest Lucas Guest

Member of the Southern Rhodesian Legislative Assembly for Hillside
- In office 1939–1948
- Preceded by: New constituency
- Succeeded by: Julius Greenfield

Member of the Southern Rhodesian Legislative Assembly for Bulawayo South
- In office 1928–1939
- Preceded by: Henry Robert Barbour; Charles Folliot Birney
- Succeeded by: Donald MacIntyre

Personal details
- Born: Harry Herbert Davies; 9 June 1878 Wales
- Died: 31 August 1957 (aged 79) Salisbury, Southern Rhodesia
- Party: Rhodesia Labour Party
- Occupation: Estate agent, politician

Harry Herbert Davies (9 June 1878 – 31 August 1957) was a Welsh-born Southern Rhodesian politician who served in the Southern Rhodesian Legislative Assembly from 1928 to 1948. A leading member of the Rhodesia Labour Party, he served as Leader of the Opposition and as Minister of Internal Affairs in the wartime government of Prime Minister Godfrey Huggins.

== Early life and career ==
Davies was born in Wales on 9 June 1878. He moved to Southern Rhodesia in 1920 and established himself as an estate agent in Bulawayo.

He became involved in the Rhodesia Labour Party and contested the two-member Bulawayo District constituency in the 1924 Southern Rhodesian general election, but was unsuccessful.

== Political career ==
=== Labour Party leadership ===
Davies was elected to the Legislative Assembly for Bulawayo South in the 1928 Southern Rhodesian general election. He retained the seat in the 1933 and 1934 elections. In the 1939 Southern Rhodesian general election, he moved to the newly established Hillside constituency in southern Bulawayo, which he retained in 1946.

In 1929, Davies was elected leader of the Rhodesia Labour Party. He subsequently served as Leader of the Opposition, holding the parliamentary position from 1934 to 1940.

=== Wartime coalition government ===
Following the outbreak of the Second World War in September 1939, Prime Minister Godfrey Huggins invited members of the opposition to join a coalition government. Davies accepted and was appointed Minister of Internal Affairs, serving until 1944.

His participation in the government caused divisions within the Rhodesia Labour Party. Some Labour members supported co-operation with Huggins during the war, while others opposed participation in a government led by the United Party. The dispute led to a split within Labour.

The rival Labour factions reunited in 1943 and briefly posed a political challenge to Huggins. However, disagreements over whether the party should admit black members and become a multiracial organisation led to renewed divisions and its disintegration in 1944.

=== Later career ===
Davies continued to represent Hillside after leaving the government. He was defeated by Julius Greenfield of Huggins' United Party in the 1948 Southern Rhodesian general election, ending his 20-year parliamentary career.

Davies died in Salisbury on 31 August 1957, aged 79.

Southern Rhodesian Legislative Assembly
Preceded by Henry Robert Barbour; Charles Folliot Birney	Member of Parliament for Bulawayo South; 1928–1939	Succeeded by Donald MacIntyre
New constituency	Member of Parliament for Hillside; 1939–1948	Succeeded by Julius Greenfield
Political offices
Preceded by Percy Finn	Leader of the Opposition; 1934–1940	Succeeded by Donald MacIntyre
Preceded by Percival Fynn	Minister of Internal Affairs; 1939–1944	Succeeded by Sir Ernest Lucas Guest
