= Herbert Melville Guest =

Mayor of Klerksdorp
- In office 1910–1911
- Monarch: George V
- Governor General: Herbert Gladstone
- Prime Minister: Louis Botha

Personal details
- Born: 29 January 1853 Kidderminster, England
- Died: 29 June 1938 (aged 85)
- Resting place: Klerksdorp Old Cemetery
- Spouse: Lucy Charlotte Lucas (married 1877)
- Relations: Ernest Melville Guest (grandson); Ivor Forbes Guest (grandson)
- Children: Ernest Lucas Guest

Military service
- Allegiance: British Empire
- Battles/wars: Second Boer War

Herbert Melville Guest (29 January 1853 – 29 June 1938) was an author, newspaper owner and politician of the Transvaal. He acquired the Klerksdorp Mining Record in 1889. He wrote several books on the Second Boer War in the area of Klerksdorp. In 1903 he became one of the first city council members and was mayor from 1910 to 1911. One of his sons was Ernest Lucas Guest, the prominent government minister of Southern Rhodesia.

== Early life ==
Herbert Melville Guest was born on 29 January 1853 in Kidderminster, England, the son of Herbert and Mary Guest. In 1861, Guest's father moved the family to Grahamstown, Cape Colony (in modern South Africa's Eastern Cape), where he was appointed manager of the Frontier Times. At the age of 13, Herbert was apprenticed to the Grahamstown Journal.

In 1869, diamonds were discovered on a farm belonging to the De Beers brothers in Colesberg Kopje, which was to become Kimberley, sparking off a rush. The following year, Herbert Melville moved to Kimberley with the staff of the new Diamond News, published by the owners of the Grahamstown Journal.

After a few years he returned to Grahamstown and joined his father's printing, bookselling and stationer's business.

== Career ==
In 1889, three years after the discovery of the gold fields, Guest moved to Klerksdorp in the Transvaal, acquiring The Representative and renamed it the Klerksdorp Mining Record in August of the same year. It exists today, after several name changes, as the Klerksdorp Rekord.

In Klerksdorp, Guest participated in the local institutions and formed the Chamber of Mines and the Chamber of Commerce. Shortly before the outbreak of the Anglo Boer War, Guest ceased publication of the newspaper and took his family away from Klerksdorp. He returned in February 1901. During the last two years of the war, he wrote several short volumes about it. He was a member of the Town Guard in charge of a post. His son Ernest spoke of a night spent on picket duty with his father, describing how some mounted Boers, appearing at dusk about 1,000 yards away, took off when his father shot at them.

At the conclusion of the War in 1902, the Transvaal became a colony of the British Empire, under direct British Rule, as set out in the terms of the Treaty of Vereeniging. Farmers whose property had been damaged by British troops during the War were able to claim compensation and Guest was on the Compensation Committee handling the claims.

He became a city councillor in 1903 in the newly formed Klerksdorp city council. He also played a leading role in the Chamber of Commerce, the Transvaal Municipal Association and several other local institutions. In 1910, following the South Africa Act 1909 of the British Parliament, the Transvaal Colony was amalgamated with the Cape Colony, Orange River Colony and the Colony of Natal, into the British dominion of the Union of South Africa, becoming the Transvaal Province. Klerksdorp's first mayor was Herbert Guest from 1910 to 1911.

== Personal life ==
On 19 April 1877, Guest and Lucy Charlotte Lucas were married at St.Bartholomew’s Church, by the Lord Bishop of Grahamstown. They had five sons and two daughters.

The eldest son, Ivor (1879–1917), served as a lieutenant in the Engineers in the Boer War. He served again in the Witwatersrand Rifles in the South-West Africa Campaign of the First World War. After the regiment was disbanded at the end of the campaign, he was commissioned as a machine gun officer in the Second Cape Corps for service in East Africa; he was killed in action on 6 November 1917 at the Battle of Mahiwa while checking the advance of a vastly superior enemy force. His gun crew had become casualties and he was handling the gun himself when he was killed.

Harold Herman (1880–1939) joined his father in the family printing business, and was, like his father, mayor of Klerksdorp, from 1923 to 1926. He wrote a history of Klerskdorp, Voortrekkerdorp, after the Voortrekkers who first settled there in 1837. It was published posthumously in 1939.

Ernest Lucas (20 August 1882 – 20 September 1972), saw action in the Second Boer War and the First World War. Between the wars, he became a lawyer and was admitted to the High Court of Southern Rhodesia (present day Zimbabwe) and moved to Bulawayo and then joined the firm of Coghlan and Welsh in the Salisbury office. After WWI, Guest took over the firm's office, which became Coghlan, Welsh and Guest, and also served on the Salisbury Town Council, becoming Deputy Mayor. He was elected in 1928 to represent Charter in the Legislative Assembly for the Rhodesia Party and was appointed a cabinet minister in 1938 by Godfrey Huggins. During the Second World War, he was Minister of Air, overseeing the Rhodesia Air Training Group. Amongst his children was Ernest Melville Charles Guest, the distinguished Second World War RAF pilot.

Guest's two youngest sons, Cecil Marmaduke (1888–1954), known as Duke, and Oliver Basil (born 1891), served in the Transvaal Scottish in the First World War. The elder of them, Duke, was later commissioned in the South African Scottish and served in France. He was gassed and declared unfit for further service, remaining in England until the end of the war. Duke was married in England in 1918 and lived in Kent. One of his sons is the historian Ivor Forbes Guest.

Herbert Melville Guest died on 29 June 1938 and is buried in the Klerksdorp Old Cemetery.

== Work ==
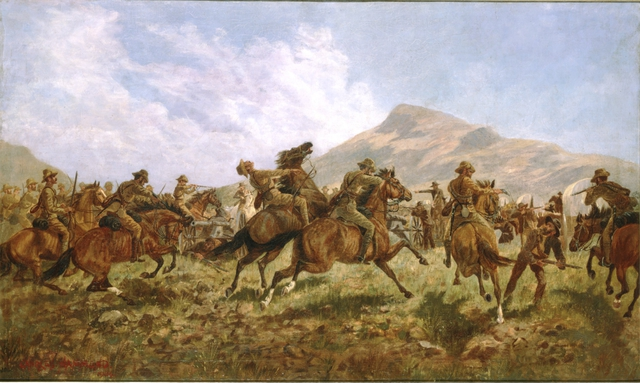
Australians and New Zealanders at Klerksdorp, 24 March 1901 during Lord Methuen's operations in the district against the Boer General De la Rey. Painting by Charles Hammond

Guest wrote a number of books about Klerksdorp and the Second Boer War.

- Vicissitudes of a Transvaal Dorp. Klerksdorp. 1901.
- With Lord Methuen: From October 1899 to December 1901. 1901.
- With Lord Methuen: From Belmont to Hartebeestfontein.
- With Lord Methuen and the First Division. 1902.
- The Anglo-Boer War: Incidents in the Western Transvaal. 1902.
- Prisoners' experiences.
- Portfolio of Klerksdorp Views. 1902.
- Klerksdorp and District. 1910.
- Some Reminiscences of Sixty Years Ago. 1925.
- History of the Guest Family. Vol. 1. 1915. (Vol. 2 (1938) by Reginal Steward Guest, one of his brothers)
- Boer War Episodes. 1939.
