= Hector Macdonald =

Hector Macdonald may refer to:

- Hector Macdonald (judge) (1915–2011), Rhodesian judge
- Hector Munro Macdonald (1865–1935), Scottish mathematician
- Hector MacDonald (1853–1903), British Army general
