= 1933 Southern Rhodesian general election =

General elections were held in Southern Rhodesia on 6 September 1933, the third elections since the colony of Southern Rhodesia was granted self-government. It is notable as one of only two general elections in Southern Rhodesia which led to a defeat for the sitting government, as the Reform Party won a narrow majority of two seats in the Legislative Assembly. Their victory was to be short-lived.

== Electoral system ==
No changes were made in the franchise or the procedure of elections since the previous election, the Electoral Act, 1928 being unamended.

== Electoral districts ==
Shortly before the election, a last-minute decision was made to revise the boundaries of electoral districts which were exceptionally large or exceptionally small. The Shamva district, to the north-east of Salisbury, was found to be too small and was abolished and merged with most of the Mazoe district; the remaining parts of both were added to Lomagundi district. In Salisbury itself, the two-member Salisbury South district was reduced to one member, and a new two-member Salisbury Central created, with knock-on effects to Salisbury North.

Outside of these changes the boundaries were the same as used in 1928.

== Political parties ==
The Progressive Party, which had won four seats to become the official opposition in 1928, merged with the County Party and reorganised itself as the Reform Party in October 1929.

== Results ==
Party	Votes	%	Seats	+/–
Reform Party	10,549	39.38	16	+12
Rhodesia Party	10,512	39.24	9	–
Rhodesia Labour Party	4,305	16.07	5	+2
Independents	1,424	5.32	0	–1
Total	26,790	100.00	30	0
Registered voters/turnout	28,515	–		
Source: Willson

=== By constituency ===
- Ind – Independent
- Lab – Rhodesia Labour Party
- Ref – Reform Party
- RP – Rhodesia Party

Constituency Electorate and turnout	Candidate	Party	Votes
BULAWAYO CENTRAL; Two members 2,114 (68.1%)	Donald MacIntyre	Lab	681
BULAWAYO CENTRAL; Two members 2,114 (68.1%)	†James Cowden	RP	616
BULAWAYO CENTRAL; Two members 2,114 (68.1%)	†Harry Bertin	RP	597
BULAWAYO CENTRAL; Two members 2,114 (68.1%)	Edward Jonathan Davies	Lab	467
BULAWAYO CENTRAL; Two members 2,114 (68.1%)	William Ewart Kay	Ref	271
BULAWAYO CENTRAL; Two members 2,114 (68.1%)	Henry Darling	Ref	249
BULAWAYO NORTH; Two members 2,092 (70.0%)	John Banks Brady	RP	681
BULAWAYO NORTH; Two members 2,092 (70.0%)	†Allan Ross Welsh	RP	761
BULAWAYO NORTH; Two members 2,092 (70.0%)	Patrick Bissett Fletcher	Ref	551
BULAWAYO NORTH; Two members 2,092 (70.0%)	William McDonald	Lab	322
BULAWAYO NORTH; Two members 2,092 (70.0%)	Francis Leslie Hadfield	Ref	303
BULAWAYO NORTH; Two members 2,092 (70.0%)	George Arthur Pingstone	Ind	148
BULAWAYO SOUTH; 1,279 (67.6%)	†Harry Herbert Davies	Lab	587
BULAWAYO SOUTH; 1,279 (67.6%)	Henry Arthur Cloete	RP	278
CHARTER; 685 (78.0%)	†Ernest Lucas Guest	RP	426
CHARTER; 685 (78.0%)	Servaas Daniel Le Roux	Ref	108
EASTERN; 951 (73.2%)	†John Louis Martin	RP	347
EASTERN; 951 (73.2%)	Ernest Plewman De Kock	Ref	147
EASTERN; 951 (73.2%)	William Hendrik Boshoff	Ind	125
EASTERN; 951 (73.2%)	Johannes Arnoldus Christiaan Kruger	Ind	77
GATOOMA; 878 (81.0%)	William Sydney Senior	Ref	318
GATOOMA; 878 (81.0%)	Thomas Alfred Kimble	Lab	261
GATOOMA; 878 (81.0%)	†George Munro	RP	132
GWANDA; 708 (75.1%)	Sir Hugh Grenville Williams	Ref	292
GWANDA; 708 (75.1%)	† George Mitchell	RP	240
GWELO; 1,070 (75.7%)	Frank Delano Thompson	Ref	345
GWELO; 1,070 (75.7%)	† Howard Unwin Moffat	RP	279
GWELO; 1,070 (75.7%)	William Harrison	Lab	186
HARTLEY; 634 (80.1%)	†Roger Edward Downes	Ref	281
HARTLEY; 634 (80.1%)	Robert Atherton Comyn	RP	121
HARTLEY; 634 (80.1%)	William Ernest Heydeman	Ind	106
INSIZA; 729 (70.0%)	†Stephen Martin Lanigan O'Keeffe	Ref	307
INSIZA; 729 (70.0%)	John Parke Richardson	RP	170
INSIZA; 729 (70.0%)	Leo George Robinson	Ind	33
INYATI; 782 (72.1%)	†Charles Spearman Jobling	Ref	329
INYATI; 782 (72.1%)	Benjamin Walter Durham	RP	235
LOMAGUNDI; 854 (71.6%)	Lewis Aloys MacDonald Hastings	RP	365
LOMAGUNDI; 854 (71.6%)	Thomas William Williamson	Ref	246
MARANDELLAS; 834 (70.6%)	Reginald Herbert Bruce Dickson	Ref	329
MARANDELLAS; 834 (70.6%)	†Luke Lot Green	RP	260
MATOPO; 998 (80.5%)	†Robert Alexander Fletcher	Ref	299
MATOPO; 998 (80.5%)	Ernest Arthur Maxwell	Lab	296
MATOPO; 998 (80.5%)	Roland Mortimer Daniel	RP	208
MAZOE; 893 (74.5%)	†Edward Walter Lionel Noaks	RP	346
MAZOE; 893 (74.5%)	†Mark Douglas Claxton	Ind	319
QUE QUE; 819 (74.5%)	Charles Walter Leppington	Ref	308
QUE QUE; 819 (74.5%)	†James Murdoch Eaton	RP	189
QUE QUE; 819 (74.5%)	Stanley James Edwards	Ind	113
RAYLTON; 1,271 (77.7%)	†Lawrence John Walter Keller	Lab	519
RAYLTON; 1,271 (77.7%)	Henry Robert Barbour	RP	370
RAYLTON; 1,271 (77.7%)	Carl Hoghoj Olsen	Ref	80
RAYLTON; 1,271 (77.7%)	William Davies	Ind	18
SALISBURY CENTRAL; Two members 2,294 (67.7%)	†Jacob Hendrik Smit	Ref	1,125
SALISBURY CENTRAL; Two members 2,294 (67.7%)	Neil Housman Wilson	Ref	835
SALISBURY CENTRAL; Two members 2,294 (67.7%)	Charles Olley	Ind	485
SALISBURY CENTRAL; Two members 2,294 (67.7%)	Milton Evan Cleveland	RP	343
SALISBURY CENTRAL; Two members 2,294 (67.7%)	Mrs. Gladys Maasdorp	RP	316
SALISBURY DISTRICT; 1,028 (74.1%)	Thomas Nangle	Ref	391
SALISBURY DISTRICT; 1,028 (74.1%)	†William Muter Leggate	RP	371
SALISBURY NORTH; Two members 1,978 (73.1%)	†Godfrey Martin Huggins	Ref	993
SALISBURY NORTH; Two members 1,978 (73.1%)	†Percival Donald Leslie Fynn	RP	747
SALISBURY NORTH; Two members 1,978 (73.1%)	Edgar Pope Vernall	Ref	642
SALISBURY NORTH; Two members 1,978 (73.1%)	William Smith	RP	508
SALISBURY SOUTH; 1,267 (79.6%)	George Henry Walker	Lab	458
SALISBURY SOUTH; 1,267 (79.6%)	William Harold Kimpton	Ref	314
SALISBURY SOUTH; 1,267 (79.6%)	Hyam Schwartz	RP	237
SELUKWE; 851 (78.4%)	†Robert Dunipace Gilchrist	Ref	507
SELUKWE; 851 (78.4%)	Mrs. Ethel Tawse Jollie	RP	160
UMTALI NORTH; 911 (77.1%)	Donald Murray Somerville	Ref	371
UMTALI NORTH; 911 (77.1%)	†Charles Eickhoff	RP	263
UMTALI NORTH; 911 (77.1%)	William Anderson Logan	Lab	68
UMTALI SOUTH; 843 (75.2%)	†Jonathan Hunter Malcolm	Lab	370
UMTALI SOUTH; 843 (75.2%)	Norman Innes	RP	264
VICTORIA; 1,032 (72.4%)	William Alexander Eustace Winterton	Ref	475
VICTORIA; 1,032 (72.4%)	Ernest George Birch	RP	272
WANKIE; 720 (65.1%)	†Alexander Robert Thomson	RP	246
WANKIE; 720 (65.1%)	Frederic Philip Mennell	Ref	133
WANKIE; 720 (65.1%)	William Doull	Lab	90

== Changes during the assembly ==
There were no byelections during this Assembly. In August 1934, most of the Reform Party merged with the Rhodesia Party to form the United Party.
