= John Murray (judge) =

South African judge, born 1888

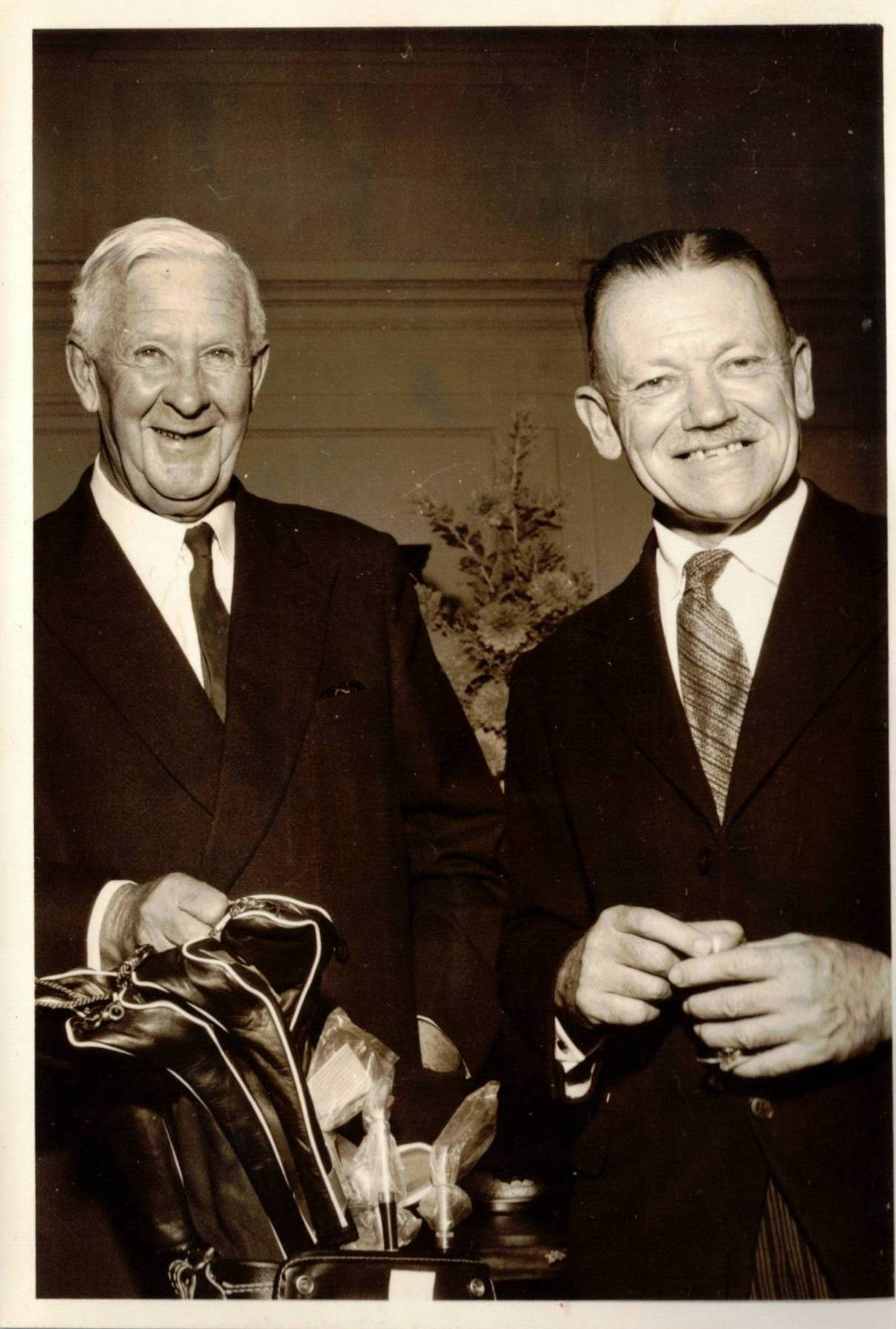

Sir John Murray Murray, QC (9 March 1888 – 10 May 1976) was a South African judge who served as Southern Rhodesia's Chief Justice from 1955 to 1961.

Murray was born in Stellenbosch in what was then known as the Cape Colony, scion of an old and prominent South African family. His father, Charles Murray, was Superintendent of Education in the colony, and his great-grandfather was the Christian pastor Andrew Murray. He read Classics at Victoria College (today the University of Stellenbosch), and then studied at Worcester College, Oxford University. He returned to South Africa in 1910 and soon thereafter was called to the bar in Pretoria.

In 1916 he married Fanny Izobel Eugene Booysen, a fellow student at Victoria College. They had 5 children - Neale, Eileen, Donald, Robert and Ewan - born between 1916 and 1925.

He was appointed Queen's Counsel in 1932, and five years later, he became a judge on the Transvaal bench. In 1955, he accepted an offer from the neighbouring territory of Southern Rhodesia to become its Chief Justice; he took office on 1 August that year. Murray was knighted on 14 August 1958. On 9 March 1961, which was his seventy-third birthday, he stepped down and was replaced by Sir Hugh Beadle. Murray retired to Plettenberg Bay, Cape Province, where he died at the age of 88 on 10 May 1976.
