= Reform Party (Southern Rhodesia) =

- Leader: Godfrey Huggins
- Founded: 1932
- Dissolved: 1939
- Headquarters: Salisbury, Southern Rhodesia
- Political position: Centre-left (perceived); Centre-right (in practice under Huggins)
- Legislative Assembly (1933): 16 / 30

The Reform Party was a political party that was formed in Southern Rhodesia in 1932, which went on to form the government under Godfrey Huggins in 1933, before splitting in 1934 and disappearing by the end of the decade. The party had support from disenchanted Rhodesian settlers including "railway men, civil servants, artisans without a job and farmers in economic distress." Its initial program proposed the creation of a central bank to regulate the colony's currency and credit and other measures to provide economic support for white workers and farmers facing competition from low paid African workers and manufacturers facing competition from cheaper South African imports.

The party won the 1933 general election, winning 16 out of 30 seats in the Southern Rhodesian Legislative Assembly and formed the government with party leader Godfrey Huggins becoming Prime Minister of Southern Rhodesia. However, the party failed to implement its promise of establishing a central bank or regulating the monetary system.

The Reform Party was believed by many in Rhodesia to be a left-wing party but Huggins presented a cautiously conservative Cabinet after winning power in 1933. In particular, Finance Minister Jacob Smit was a strong believer in conventional economics and opponent of Keynesianism. The course of government led eventually to a confrontration in August 1934 with the left wing of the party over reform to the Rhodesian railways. Huggins decided to approach Sir Percy Fynn, leader of the Rhodesia Party, who pledged support for a National Government under Huggins.

However, the Acting Governor refused a dissolution on the grounds that the Assembly had many years left, and the government had not been defeated. Huggins persuaded the majority of the Executive of the Reform Party to suspend the party's constitution to allow a National Government on 17 September, and then formed the United Party with Fynn, asking a second time for a dissolution on the basis of a changed party alignment. This time the Acting Governor acceded.

The November 1934 election resulted in a landslide for Huggins' United Party, which won 24 out of 30 seats, while the Reform Party returned only one seat in the new legislature. Huggins himself switched electoral districts and ran and defeated Reform Party MP Thomas Nangle who had been one of the Reform Party's founders.

The Reform Party contested the next election in November 1939, receiving 12% of the popular vote and losing its remaining seat in parliament and disappeared with some of its supporters moving to the Opposition Rhodesia Labour Party.

== Bibliography ==
- Source Book of Parliamentary Elections and Referenda in Southern Rhodesia 1898–1962 ed. by F.M.G. Willson (Department of Government, University College of Rhodesia and Nyasaland, Salisbury 1963)
- Holders of Administrative and Ministerial Office 1894–1964 by F.M.G. Willson and G.C. Passmore, assisted by Margaret T. Mitchell (Source Book No. 3, Department of Government, University College of Rhodesia and Nyasaland, Salisbury 1966)
