= Julian Greenfield =

Southern Rhodesian lawyer, politician and judge

Julian MacDonald Greenfield, CMG (Julius in some sources; 13 July 1907 – 1993) was a Southern Rhodesian lawyer, politician, and judge who held office in Southern Rhodesia and within the Federation of Rhodesia and Nyasaland.

== Biography ==
Born in Boksburg, South Africa, the son of a Canadian-born Presbyterian minister, Greenfield moved with his family to Southern Rhodesia in 1909. He was educated at Milton School, the University of Cape Town, where he read law, and University College, Oxford, where he was a Rhodes scholar and graduated BA and BCL. He was also admitted as a student to Gray's Inn.

Returning to Rhodesia, Greenfield was called to the bar and began private practice as a barrister in Bulawayo. He became involved with the new United Party, and in 1948 was elected for Hillside. In 1949, he became a KC. In 1950, he was appointed Minister of Internal Affairs and Minister of Justice.

A strong supporter of the formation of the Federation of Rhodesia and Nyasaland, he was nominated for the leadership of the United Party, which carried with it succession to Sir Godfrey Huggins as prime minister of Southern Rhodesia. In the first round, he and Garfield Todd tied, and Humphrey Gibbs gave his casting vote to Greenfield, who showed reluctance to accept the decision. A second vote was later taken, and Todd defeated Greenfield. In his memoirs, Greenfield claimed he had always meant to enter Federal politics and supported Todd, but had allowed his name to go forward to test Todd's acceptability to the party.

After serving under Todd during a transition phase, Greenfield served as the Federation of Rhodesia and Nyasaland's Minister of Education and Minister of Home Affairs, then Minister of Law.

After the dissolution of the Federation, Greenfield return to legal practice. He opposed Rhodesia's unilateral declaration of independence. In 1968, he became a judge on the Appellate Division of the High Court of Rhodesia, in succession to Sir John Fieldsend. He retired in 1974.

== Assessments ==
Lord Blake described Greenfield as "cautious, clear-headed, capable". Ian Smith described him as "having a good reputation practising as an advocate at our bar, and as a cabinet minister his performance was immaculate", but claimed that "he was such a quiet, retiring person that he never came up for consideration as a leader" when Huggins retired as federal prime minister.
