= Vernon Arthur Lewis =

Vernon Arthur Lewis, CMG, MC (died 1950) was a South Rhodesian politician and judge.

Born in Southern Rhodesia, Lewis was educated at the South African College and New College, Oxford, where he was a Rhodes scholar. He was called to the English bar by the Inner Temple in 1910. During the First World War, he commanded a battery and received the Military Cross.

He was elected to the Legislative Assembly of Southern Rhodesia for Salisbury North in the 1934 Southern Rhodesian general election as the United Party candidate, and served as Minister of Justice, Minister of Defence, and Minister of Internal Affairs.

He was appointed to the High Court of Southern Rhodesia in 1936. He was acting Chief Justice of Southern Rhodesia for a few days in 1950 until his death. He had been appointed a CMG in 1946.

He was the son-law of Sir Leander Starr Jameson, having married his daughter. Their son, John Vernon Radcliffe Lewis, was also a judge in Southern Rhodesia.
