= Max Danziger =

South Rhodesian politician

Max Danziger, CBE (1 March 1886 – 1953) was a Southern Rhodesian politician who served as Minister of Finance from 1942 to 1946.

== Early life ==
The son of Bernard Danziger, a pioneer jeweler, he was born at Worcester, Cape Colony and grew up in Johannesburg. He was educated at the Marist Brothers School and the South African College at Cape Town. He subsequently qualified as an attorney and moved to Gwelo, Southern Rhodesia.

== Career ==
Danziger was a member of the Legislative Assembly of Southern Rhodesia (M.P.) for Gwelo, then for Selukwe. Danziger was Minister of Finance and Commerce and Minister of Supply from 1942 to 1944 in the Cabinet of Sir Godfrey Huggins. He was Minister of Finance from 1944 to 1946.

He governed South Rhodesia's economy throughout WWII.

== Personal life ==
Danziger was Jewish. He was the first Jew to hold a cabinet position in Rhodesia.

He was described as "a man as notorious for his sarcasm as for his amorous exploits". Danziger was given permission to retain "The Honourable" in 1946 and was appointed a CBE in 1952.
