= Percy Fynn =

Rhodesian diplomat & politician (1872-1940)

Sir Percival Flynn CMG

Minister of Internal Affairs
- In office 13 November 1935 – 3 October 1939
- Prime Minister: Godfrey Huggins
- Preceded by: Vernon Arthur Lewis
- Succeeded by: Harry Davies

Minister without Portfolio
- In office 1934–1935

Member of the Parliament of Rhodesia for Salisbury North
- In office 1924–1934

Personal details
- Born: 16 August 1872
- Died: 25 April 1940 (aged 67)
- Party: Rhodesia Party; United Rhodesia Party

Sir Percival Donald Leslie Fynn, CMG (16 August 1872 – 25 April 1940) was a Rhodesian politician.

He was Treasurer in the First Cabinet of Southern Rhodesia.

In 1933, he pledged his support to Godfrey Huggins for a government of national unity: this led to the merger of the Rhodesia Party and the Reform Party into the United Party. Under Higgins, he was Minister without Portfolio from 1934 until 1935 and Minister of Internal Affairs from 1935 until 1939.
