= Ian Smith =

Prime Minister of Rhodesia from 1964 to 1979

The Right Honourable Ian Smith GCLM ID
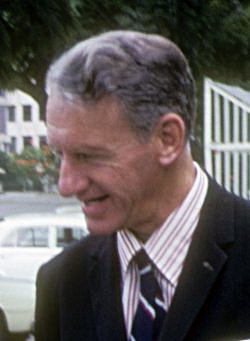
- Smith in 1975

8th Prime Minister of Rhodesia (Note: Known as Southern Rhodesia until October 1964)
- In office 13 April 1964 – 1 June 1979 (Note: In the eyes of the UK, Smith legally stopped being prime minister when his government declared independence on 11 November 1965. In practice, he remained in office until 1979.)
- Governor: Sir Humphrey Gibbs (until 1969)
- Monarch (until 1970): Elizabeth II (Note: Elizabeth II's representative in Rhodesia—the Governor, Sir Humphrey Gibbs— formally dismissed Smith upon the declaration of independence in 1965. The dismissal was not enforced, and the government remained a constitutional monarchy until 1970.)
- Presidents (from 1970): Clifford Dupont; Henry Everard (acting); John Wrathall; Henry Everard (acting); Jack Pithey (acting); Henry Everard (acting)
- Deputy: Clifford Dupont; John Wrathall; David Smith
- Preceded by: Winston Field
- Succeeded by: Office abolished Abel Muzorewa (as Prime Minister of Zimbabwe Rhodesia)

Leader of the Rhodesian Front
- In office 13 April 1964 – 6 June 1981
- Preceded by: Winston Field
- Succeeded by: Office abolished

Member of the House of Assembly of Rhodesia for Umzingwane
- In office 10 April 1970 – 10 April 1979
- Preceded by: New constituency
- Succeeded by: Parliament dissolved
Ministerial offices
Deputy Prime Minister of Southern Rhodesia
In office 17 December 1962 – 13 April 1964
Prime Minister	Winston Field
Preceded by	Position established
Succeeded by	Clifford Dupont
Minister of the Treasury
In office 17 December 1962 – 13 April 1964
Prime Minister	Winston Field
Preceded by	Geoffrey Ellman Brown
Succeeded by	John Wrathall
Minister of Posts
In office 29 November 1963 – 13 April 1964
Prime Minister	Winston Field
Preceded by	Position established
Succeeded by	John Wrathall
Minister of External Affairs and Defence
In office 13 April 1964 – 28 August 1964
Prime Minister	Himself
Preceded by	Winston Field
Succeeded by	Clifford Dupont (External Affairs); Himself (Defence)
In office 11 November 1965 – 1966
Prime Minister	Himself
Preceded by	Clifford Dupont
Succeeded by	The Duke of Montrose
Minister of Defence
In office 28 August 1964 – 4 September 1964
Prime Minister	Himself
Preceded by	Himself (Minister of External Affairs and Defence)
Succeeded by	Clifford Dupont
Minister without portfolio
In office 1 June 1979 – 12 December 1979
Prime Minister	Abel Muzorewa
Preceded by	Phillip van Heerden
Succeeded by	Position abolished
Constituencies
Member of the Southern Rhodesian Legislative Assembly for Selukwe
In office 15 September 1948 – 11 December 1953
Preceded by	George Baden-Powell Tunmer
Succeeded by	George Baden-Powell Tunmer
Member of the Rhodesia and Nyasaland Federal Assembly for Midlands
In office 15 December 1953 – 12 November 1958
Preceded by	New constituency
Member of the Rhodesia and Nyasaland Federal Assembly for Gwanda
In office 12 November 1958 – 27 April 1962
Member of the Southern Rhodesian Legislative Assembly for Umzingwane
In office 14 December 1962 – 10 April 1970
Preceded by	New constituency
Succeeded by	Parliament dissolved
Member of the House of Assembly of Zimbabwe Rhodesia for Southern Constituency
In office 10 April 1979 – 12 December 1979
Preceded by	New constituency
Succeeded by	Parliament dissolved
Member of the House of Assembly of Zimbabwe for Southern Constituency
In office 18 April 1980 – 1 July 1985
Preceded by	New constituency
Succeeded by	David Clive Mitchell
Member of the House of Assembly of Zimbabwe for Bulawayo Central
In office 1 July 1985 – September 1987
Preceded by	Patrick Francis Shields
Succeeded by	White roll abolished

Personal details
- Born: Ian Douglas Smith; 8 April 1919 Selukwe, Rhodesia (Note: Selukwe and Shurugwi are the same place; the town was renamed in 1982.)
- Died: 20 November 2007 (aged 88) Cape Town, South Africa
- Resting place: Near Shurugwi, Zimbabwe; (ashes scattered)
- Party: Liberal (1948–1953); United Federal (1953–1961); Rhodesian Front and successors (1962–1992); Forum Party (1992–1999); Movement for Democratic Change (1999–2007)
- Spouse: Janet Watt (m. 1948; died 1994)
- Children: 3, including Alec
- Education: Rhodes University (BComm)

Military service
- Allegiance: United Kingdom; Southern Rhodesia
- Branch/service: Royal Air Force
- Years of service: 1941–1945
- Rank: Flight lieutenant
- Battles/wars: Second World War
- Awards: Legion of Merit; Independence Decoration

Ian Douglas Smith (8 April 1919 – 20 November 2007) was a Rhodesian and Zimbabwean politician, farmer and Royal Air Force fighter pilot who served as Prime Minister of Rhodesia from 1964 to 1979. As leader of the Rhodesian Front, he headed a white-minority government that resisted the introduction of majority rule in Rhodesia. On 11 November 1965, his government issued a unilateral declaration of independence (UDI) from the United Kingdom. The declaration was not internationally recognised, and Smith's government subsequently faced United Nations economic sanctions and an increasingly protracted conflict with African nationalist movements.

Born in Selukwe (now Shurugwi), Southern Rhodesia, to British settler parents, Smith served in the Royal Air Force during the Second World War. After the war, he completed his studies at Rhodes University, became a farmer and was elected to the Southern Rhodesian parliament in 1948. Initially a member of the Liberal Party, he later joined the United Federal Party before co-founding the Rhodesian Front in 1962. He became deputy prime minister under Winston Field that year and succeeded Field as prime minister in April 1964.

Smith's government sought independence without accepting British conditions for progress towards majority rule. Following UDI, Rhodesia remained governed by a white minority, although black Africans constituted the overwhelming majority of its population. Electoral qualifications and the allocation of parliamentary seats restricted African political representation. In 1970, Smith's government declared Rhodesia a republic, but the country remained internationally isolated. During his premiership, the Rhodesian Bush War intensified as the Rhodesian security forces fought nationalist guerrilla movements, principally the Zimbabwe African National Union (ZANU) and the Zimbabwe African People's Union (ZAPU). By the late 1970s, military pressure, economic sanctions and changes in the regional political situation had weakened the government's position.

In 1978, Smith negotiated the Internal Settlement with several black nationalist leaders. The agreement led to the short-lived establishment of Zimbabwe Rhodesia in 1979, with Abel Muzorewa as prime minister, but excluded ZANU and ZAPU and failed to secure international recognition or end the war. Smith subsequently took part in the Lancaster House negotiations, which led to British-supervised elections and internationally recognised independence as Zimbabwe in April 1980. He remained a member of the Zimbabwean parliament until 1987 and continued to criticise the government of Robert Mugabe. Smith died in Cape Town, South Africa, in 2007. His political legacy remains associated with UDI, the maintenance of white-minority rule and the conflict that preceded Zimbabwean independence.

== Early life and education ==
=== Family, childhood and adolescence ===
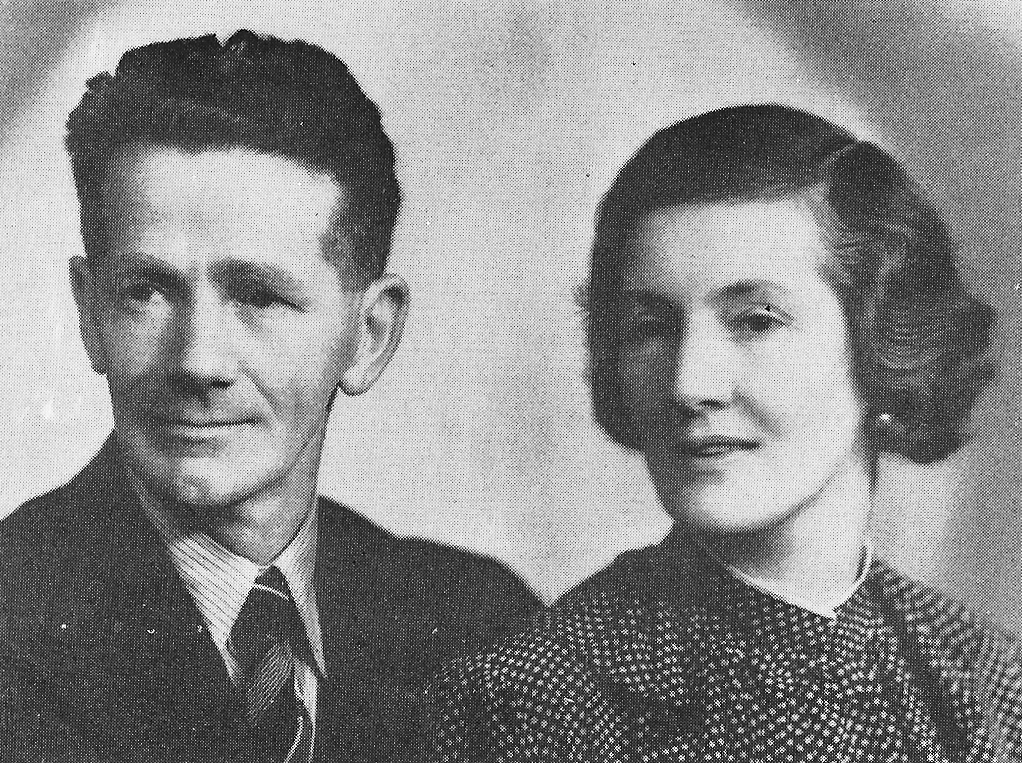
Smith's parents, Jock and Agnes, in 1935

Ian Douglas Smith was born on 8 April 1919 in Selukwe (now Shurugwi), a mining and farming town in Southern Rhodesia (now Zimbabwe). He was the son of John Douglas "Jock" Smith (1879–1956) and Agnes Smith (née Hodgson; 1891–1978), and had two elder sisters. His father, who had grown up in Scotland, emigrated to Southern Rhodesia in 1898 and established business interests in farming, mining and livestock. His mother came from a family that had emigrated from Cumberland in England.

The Smith family was involved in the civic and social institutions of Selukwe's white settler community. Jock Smith served on the local management board and was active in sporting organisations, while Agnes Smith helped establish the local Women's Institute. Both received appointments as Members of the Order of the British Empire for community service. Smith later identified his parents, particularly his father, as important influences on his values and political outlook.

Smith grew up in a society in which political power was concentrated in the white settler population, despite Africans constituting the great majority of Southern Rhodesia's inhabitants. His upbringing reflected the strong identification with Britain and the British Empire prevalent among white Rhodesian settlers. In later accounts of his childhood, Smith emphasised his family's attachment to Rhodesia and his father's influence on his understanding of relations between its white and black populations.

Smith attended primary school in Selukwe before boarding at Chaplin School in Gwelo (now Gweru). He participated in several sports and held leadership positions at school. In 1938, he enrolled at Rhodes University College in Grahamstown, South Africa, to study for a Bachelor of Commerce degree. He continued to participate in sport, particularly rugby and rowing. His university studies were subsequently interrupted by the Second World War.

=== Second World War; Royal Air Force pilot ===
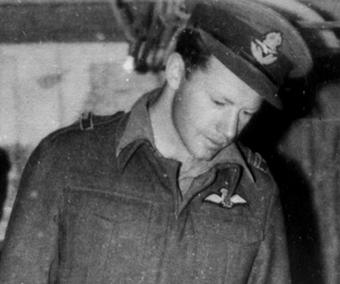
Smith with No. 237 (Rhodesia) Squadron RAF, c. 1943, in the Second World War's Middle Eastern theatre

At the outbreak of the Second World War in September 1939, Smith was studying at Rhodes University College in Grahamstown, South Africa. Southern Rhodesia, which had enjoyed responsible government since 1923, entered the war when Britain declared war on Germany on 3 September 1939, although its government also issued a separate, symbolic declaration. Smith later recalled feeling obliged to interrupt his studies to serve in the British armed forces, preferably as a fighter pilot.

Recruitment restrictions initially prevented university students from enlisting before graduation, part of a wider effort to preserve Southern Rhodesia's civilian workforce during the war. Smith approached air force recruitment officials in Salisbury during 1940 and was eventually accepted for pilot training. According to his autobiography, he initially concealed his university enrolment to avoid being rejected. He formally enlisted in the Royal Air Force (RAF) in September 1941, receiving service number 80463.

Smith trained in Southern Rhodesia under the Empire Air Training Scheme, through which the colony provided facilities for the training of Allied aircrew. He began at an initial training establishment in Bulawayo, before transferring to the Elementary Flying Training School at Guinea Fowl, near Gwelo. There he learned to fly de Havilland Tiger Moth and Harvard aircraft. He subsequently underwent officer-cadet training at Thornhill, also near Gwelo. He completed his training in September 1942 and was commissioned as a pilot officer.

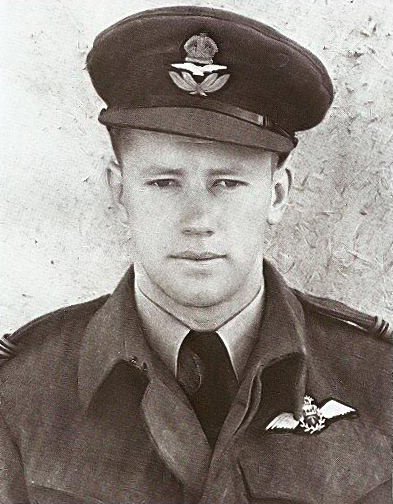
Smith in the 1940s

Although Smith had hoped to serve in Britain, he was posted to the Middle East. After arriving in Egypt, he underwent operational training on Hawker Hurricane fighters before joining No. 237 (Rhodesia) Squadron RAF. The squadron, which had originated in the Southern Rhodesian Air Force, had been incorporated into the RAF in April 1940. During Smith's early service, No. 237 Squadron was stationed in Iran and Iraq, where its duties included the protection of strategically important oil installations. It subsequently returned to North Africa, where Smith flew operational missions in Hurricanes. He was promoted to flying officer in March 1943.

On 4 October 1943, Smith was seriously injured when his Hurricane crashed during takeoff from an airfield at Idku, Egypt. The accident occurred while he was preparing to escort a shipping convoy. Accounts attribute the crash to a throttle malfunction and describe the aircraft striking sandbags at the end of the runway. Smith suffered severe facial injuries, a broken jaw and fractures to his leg and shoulder. He underwent reconstructive surgery in Cairo, including skin grafting, and was left with permanent facial scarring.

After approximately five months of recovery, Smith was declared fit to resume flying in March 1944. He declined an opportunity to return to Southern Rhodesia as an instructor and instead undertook refresher training before rejoining No. 237 Squadron in Corsica in May. By then the squadron had converted to Supermarine Spitfire Mk IX fighters. Operating from Corsica, Smith flew missions over northern Italy in support of the Allied Italian campaign. These included attacks on German transport and communications targets.

On 22 June 1944, during a strafing attack on railway facilities in the Po Valley, Smith's Spitfire was hit by German anti-aircraft fire. He abandoned the aircraft by parachute and landed in the Ligurian Alps, behind German lines. He avoided capture with assistance from local civilians, including members of the Zunino family, who sheltered him shortly after his landing.

Smith subsequently made contact with the Italian resistance movement. He spent approximately three months with partisans operating in the mountains of northwestern Italy. According to accounts published by Smith and his biographer Phillippa Berlyn, he participated in sabotage operations against German forces during this period. Following the withdrawal of German troops from the area around Sassello in October 1944, Smith attempted to reach Allied forces in southern France, where the Allies had landed during Operation Dragoon in August.

Assisted by Italian civilians and accompanied by other Allied servicemen, Smith travelled westwards across the Maritime Alps. The journey took more than three weeks and involved crossing mountainous terrain in increasingly severe autumn weather. The party eventually reached American forces in November 1944. Smith was subsequently returned to Allied control and arrived at an RAF transit camp in Naples later that month.

Smith was again offered an opportunity to return to Southern Rhodesia, but chose to resume operational flying. After refresher training in Britain, he joined No. 130 (Punjab) Squadron RAF, part of a fighter wing commanded by Johnnie Johnson. He reported to the squadron at Celle, Germany, on 23 April 1945 and flew combat missions during the final weeks of the European war. Following Germany's surrender on 8 May, he remained with the squadron, serving in Denmark and Norway before returning to Britain. He was demobilised towards the end of 1945 with the rank of flight lieutenant.

Smith's RAF service later became an important part of his public image and political identity. He repeatedly invoked Southern Rhodesia's contribution to the Allied war effort when criticising British policy towards Rhodesian independence, particularly during the constitutional dispute preceding Unilateral Declaration of Independence in 1965. His wartime record also featured in portrayals of him as a patriotic British figure, despite his subsequent leadership of an internationally unrecognised white-minority government. Historian Luise White has placed Smith's military service within the broader history of white Rhodesian participation in overseas conflicts and the later political significance attached to those experiences. Smith continued to wear an RAF pilot's tie during his political career, including near the end of his premiership in 1979.

=== Graduation, marriage and entrance to politics ===
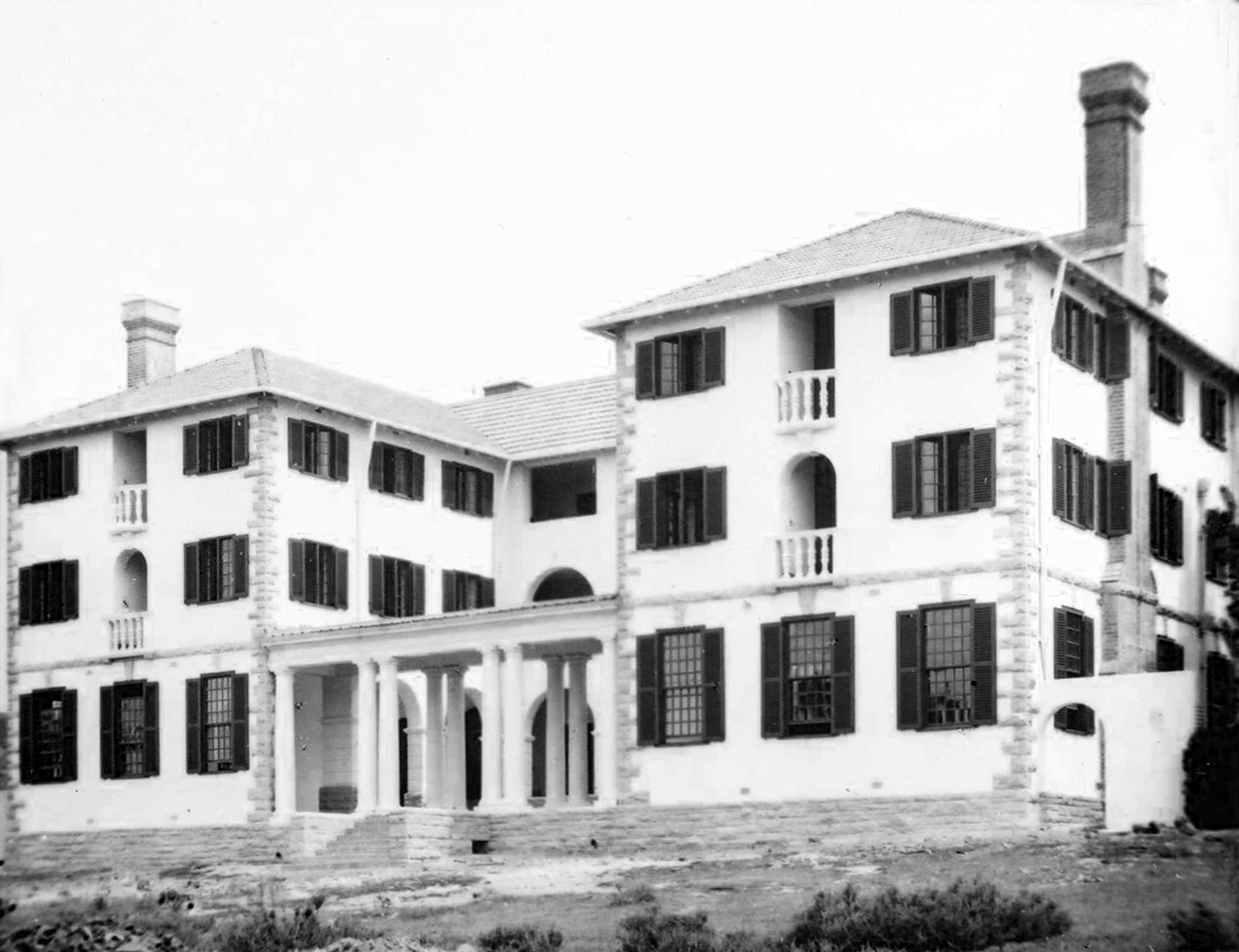
College House, a men's residence at Rhodes University in South Africa, Smith's alma mater

Following his demobilisation in 1945, Smith returned to Rhodes University in South Africa to complete his Bachelor of Commerce degree. He became chairman of the students' representative council and coached the university rowing team, which won the 1946 South African Inter-Varsity Boat Race. He then returned to Southern Rhodesia and studied agriculture at Gwebi College of Agriculture, near Salisbury, during 1947 and 1948, gaining practical experience in dairy and tobacco farming.

In 1947, Smith met Janet Duvenage (née Watt), a South African schoolteacher and widow with two children, Jean and Robert. They married in August 1948, and Smith adopted her children. Their son, Alec, was born the following year. Smith also purchased a 3,600-acre (15 km^{2}) property near Selukwe, which he named Gwenoro and developed into a cattle and tobacco farm.

Smith entered politics when the opposition Liberal Party invited him to contest Selukwe in the September 1948 general election. Although Southern Rhodesia's voting qualifications were formally non-racial, property, income and educational requirements excluded most black Africans, leaving the electorate overwhelmingly white.

Smith's campaign benefited from his family's local standing and his wartime service. On 15 September 1948, he defeated United Party candidate Petrus Cilliers and Labour Party candidate Egon Klifborg, receiving 361 of the 747 votes cast. At 29, he became the youngest member of the Southern Rhodesian Legislative Assembly. Despite his victory, the Liberals fell from 12 seats to five, and Raymond Stockil subsequently became party leader, renaming it the Rhodesia Party.

== Parliament ==
=== Backbencher ===
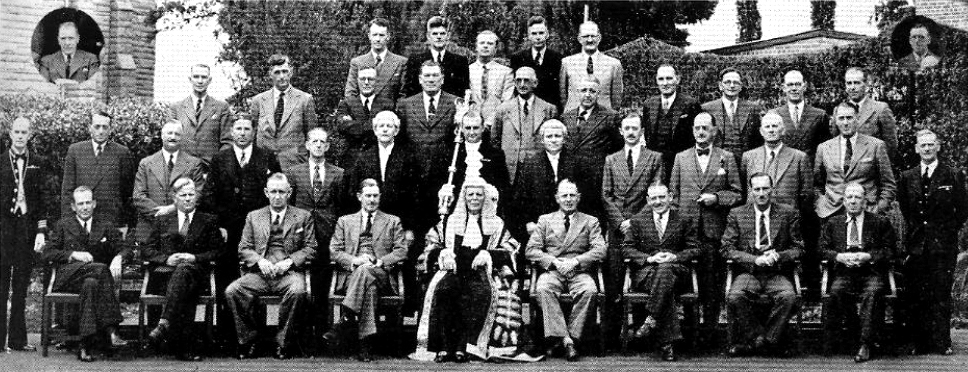
The seventh Southern Rhodesian Legislative Assembly in 1948, with Smith at the far left of the back row

Smith entered the Southern Rhodesian Legislative Assembly in November 1948, delivering his maiden speech during debate on a trade agreement with the Union of South Africa. His early parliamentary contributions focused largely on agriculture and mining, while he continued to manage his farm at Gwenoro. Although he initially attracted little attention in the legislature, he gained the confidence of Raymond Stockil, leader of the opposition Liberal Party, subsequently renamed the Rhodesia Party.

During the early 1950s, Southern Rhodesian politics increasingly centred on proposals for a federation with Northern Rhodesia and Nyasaland. Prime Minister Sir Godfrey Huggins supported federation as a means of strengthening the region economically and politically, with the eventual aim of achieving Dominion status. Smith, however, favoured securing Southern Rhodesian independence and questioned whether federation would advance that objective. He proposed a constitutional guarantee that Southern Rhodesia would receive Dominion status if the federation dissolved, but the governing United Party rejected the suggestion.

Despite his reservations, Smith accepted the outcome of the April 1953 referendum, in which the predominantly white electorate approved federation, and publicly called for the new arrangement to succeed. On 29 April 1953, he joined the Federal Party, led by Huggins and Northern Rhodesian politician Roy Welensky, alongside other members of the Rhodesia Party.

=== Federation; Chief Whip ===
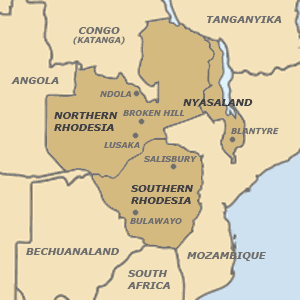
The three territories of the Federation of Rhodesia and Nyasaland

The Federation of Rhodesia and Nyasaland was established in 1953, with Salisbury as its capital and Sir Godfrey Huggins as its first prime minister. Smith resigned his seat in the Southern Rhodesian Legislative Assembly and was elected to the new Federal Assembly for Midlands in the December 1953 federal election. He remained a backbencher during the early years of federation, concentrating principally on agricultural and educational matters. Roy Welensky, who succeeded Huggins as federal prime minister in 1956, later recalled that Smith took relatively little part in parliamentary affairs.

In the November 1958 federal election, Smith was returned as the member for Gwanda. Welensky subsequently appointed him Chief Whip of the governing United Federal Party (UFP), declining a suggestion that Smith instead become a parliamentary secretary. Although Welensky recognised Smith's parliamentary experience, he considered that Smith had yet to demonstrate sufficient initiative for ministerial office.

Smith's tenure as Chief Whip attracted little public attention. His biographer Phillippa Berlyn described him as a diligent but unremarkable parliamentarian, while Clifford Dupont, Chief Whip of the opposition Dominion Party, attributed his limited prominence partly to the UFP's large parliamentary majority, which left few votes seriously contested.

=== Leaving the UFP ===
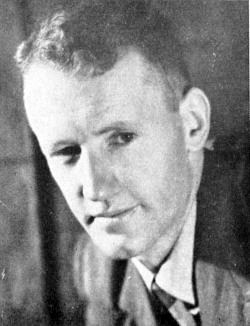
Smith in the 1950s

By the late 1950s, the Federation of Rhodesia and Nyasaland faced growing opposition from African nationalist movements, particularly in Northern Rhodesia and Nyasaland. As decolonisation accelerated, the British government increasingly opposed granting independence to territories governed by white minorities without provision for African majority rule. In Southern Rhodesia, Prime Minister Garfield Todd had lowered electoral qualifications in 1957 to increase black African participation, but registration remained limited, partly because nationalist organisations encouraged a boycott of the electoral system. The campaign was accompanied by intimidation and violence against some Africans who registered or voted.

Todd's successor, Sir Edgar Whitehead, negotiated a new constitution with Britain in 1961, hoping to secure Southern Rhodesian independence if the Federation dissolved. Although it contained no explicit guarantee of independence, Whitehead and federal prime minister Roy Welensky promoted it as a means of achieving eventual Commonwealth realm status.

The proposed constitution replaced the existing electoral roll with separate "A" and "B" rolls, distinguished by income, property and educational qualifications. The higher-qualified A roll would elect 50 members of the legislature, while the lower-qualified B roll would elect 15, with limited cross-voting between them. Although formally non-racial, the arrangements were expected to leave the A roll predominantly white and the B roll overwhelmingly black African, preserving white control of the legislature.

Smith opposed the constitution, principally because it offered no firm guarantee of independence and introduced separate electoral rolls. He argued that the division had racial implications and maintained that voting rights should depend on individual qualifications rather than race. In practice, however, the property, income and educational qualifications he supported excluded most black Africans from the electorate.

On 22 February 1961, Smith was the sole dissenter among 280 UFP members voting on the proposed constitution. He subsequently resigned from the party and continued in the Federal Assembly as an independent. He supported the United Group, an alliance of opponents of the constitution that included Winston Field's conservative Dominion Party and liberals associated with Sir Robert Clarkson Tredgold. Their objections differed substantially, particularly over the future of African political representation.

African nationalist leaders initially endorsed the constitutional proposals but soon withdrew their support and called for an electoral boycott, arguing that the arrangements did not provide an acceptable path to majority rule. In the referendum held on 26 July 1961, the predominantly white electorate approved the constitution with approximately 65% voting in favour.

=== Forming the Rhodesian Front ===
As Britain moved towards majority rule in Nyasaland and Northern Rhodesia, Smith became increasingly convinced that the Federation of Rhodesia and Nyasaland would dissolve. He advocated Southern Rhodesian independence without accepting British demands for majority rule and, with the support of businessman and rancher Douglas Lilford, established the Rhodesian Reform Party (RRP) in December 1961. The party attracted dissident members of the United Federal Party (UFP) who opposed the government's constitutional policies.

On 13 March 1962, Smith and Winston Field, leader of the conservative Dominion Party, agreed to merge their organisations into the Rhodesian Front (RF), with Field as leader. The new party brought together former UFP members and Dominion Party supporters with differing views on racial policy, ranging from advocates of gradual political reform to proponents of segregation. They were united by opposition to the reforms of Prime Minister Sir Edgar Whitehead and a commitment to maintaining white minority political control. The RF also adopted a strongly anti-communist position, presenting itself as a defender of Western interests in southern Africa. Smith declared that "The white man is the master of Rhodesia ... [he] has built it and intends to keep it".

Whitehead sought to broaden African participation in constitutional politics while restricting African nationalist organisations. He banned the National Democratic Party in December 1961 and its successor, the Zimbabwe African People's Union (ZAPU), in September 1962, when more than 1,000 of its members were arrested. He also proposed repealing the racially discriminatory Land Apportionment Act of 1930. These measures failed to secure substantial African electoral support and alienated some white voters, who increasingly turned to the RF.

The RF concentrated on the Southern Rhodesian general election rather than contesting the April 1962 federal election. Its campaign emphasised independence, opposition to compulsory racial integration and retention of the Land Apportionment Act, while warning of political instability similar to the Congo Crisis. Several businesses that had previously supported the UFP transferred their financial backing to the RF.

Shortly before polling, Whitehead announced that he intended to appoint a black African Cabinet minister if re-elected, with the possibility of further appointments. His statement, broadcast on the eve of the election, caused concern among some white voters. In the election held on 14 December 1962, the RF won 35 of the 65 seats in the Legislative Assembly, defeating the UFP, which won 29; an independent won the remaining seat. The RF secured its majority entirely from the predominantly white A-roll constituencies, while the UFP won 14 of the 15 B-roll seats. Smith was elected for Umzingwane, defeating UFP candidate Reginald Segar by 803 votes to 546. Field became prime minister, bringing the RF to power for the first time.

=== Deputy Prime Minister under Field ===
Following the Rhodesian Front's victory in the December 1962 election, Prime Minister Winston Field appointed Smith deputy prime minister and Minister of the Treasury. The new government's principal objective was to secure Southern Rhodesian independence upon the dissolution of the Federation of Rhodesia and Nyasaland. Two days after Field announced his Cabinet, British Deputy Prime Minister R. A. Butler confirmed that Nyasaland would be permitted to leave the Federation. With Northern Rhodesia also moving towards independence under an African nationalist government, the Federation's dissolution appeared inevitable.

The British government, however, was unwilling to grant Southern Rhodesia independence under its existing constitution, which preserved white minority rule. Such a move risked opposition from the Labour Party, as well as criticism from the United Nations and the Commonwealth.

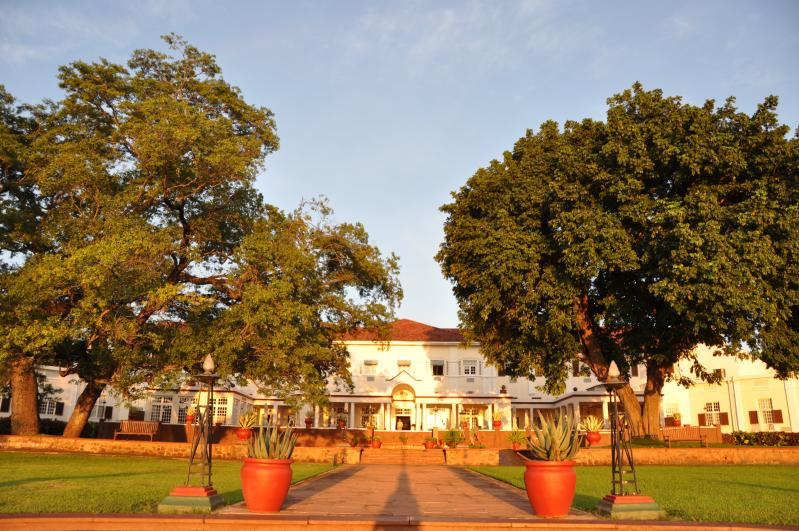
The Victoria Falls Hotel, venue of the 1963 conference on the Federation's dissolution

In March 1963, Butler announced a conference to determine the Federation's future. Southern Rhodesia's participation was considered essential because it had been a party to the original federal agreement. Field and Smith subsequently claimed that Butler had privately assured them that Southern Rhodesia would receive independence in return for its cooperation in dissolving the Federation. According to their accounts, Butler refused to put the assurance in writing, arguing that his word should be sufficient. No minutes were taken of the discussions, and Butler later denied making any such promise.

Southern Rhodesia attended the conference at the Victoria Falls Hotel, which began on 28 June 1963. The participants agreed to dissolve the Federation at the end of the year. When it formally ended on 31 December, Northern Rhodesia and Nyasaland were preparing for independence, but Southern Rhodesia's constitutional position remained unresolved.

Field's failure to obtain a firm British commitment to independence increasingly divided the Rhodesian Front. By early 1964, several senior party members regarded his negotiations with London as ineffective. On 2 April, at a parliamentary party meeting chaired by Smith, the RF passed a near-unanimous vote of no confidence in Field. He resigned as prime minister on 13 April, and Smith accepted the Cabinet's nomination to succeed him.

Smith became the first Southern Rhodesian prime minister born in the territory. (Note: Roy Welensky, prime minister of the Federation from 1956 to 1963, was also born in Southern Rhodesia, but had not served as prime minister of Southern Rhodesia itself.) He later attached particular significance to this distinction, arguing that his local origins gave him a different perspective on relations with Britain from that of his predecessors.

== Prime minister ==
=== First months; banning of PCC/ZAPU and ZANU ===
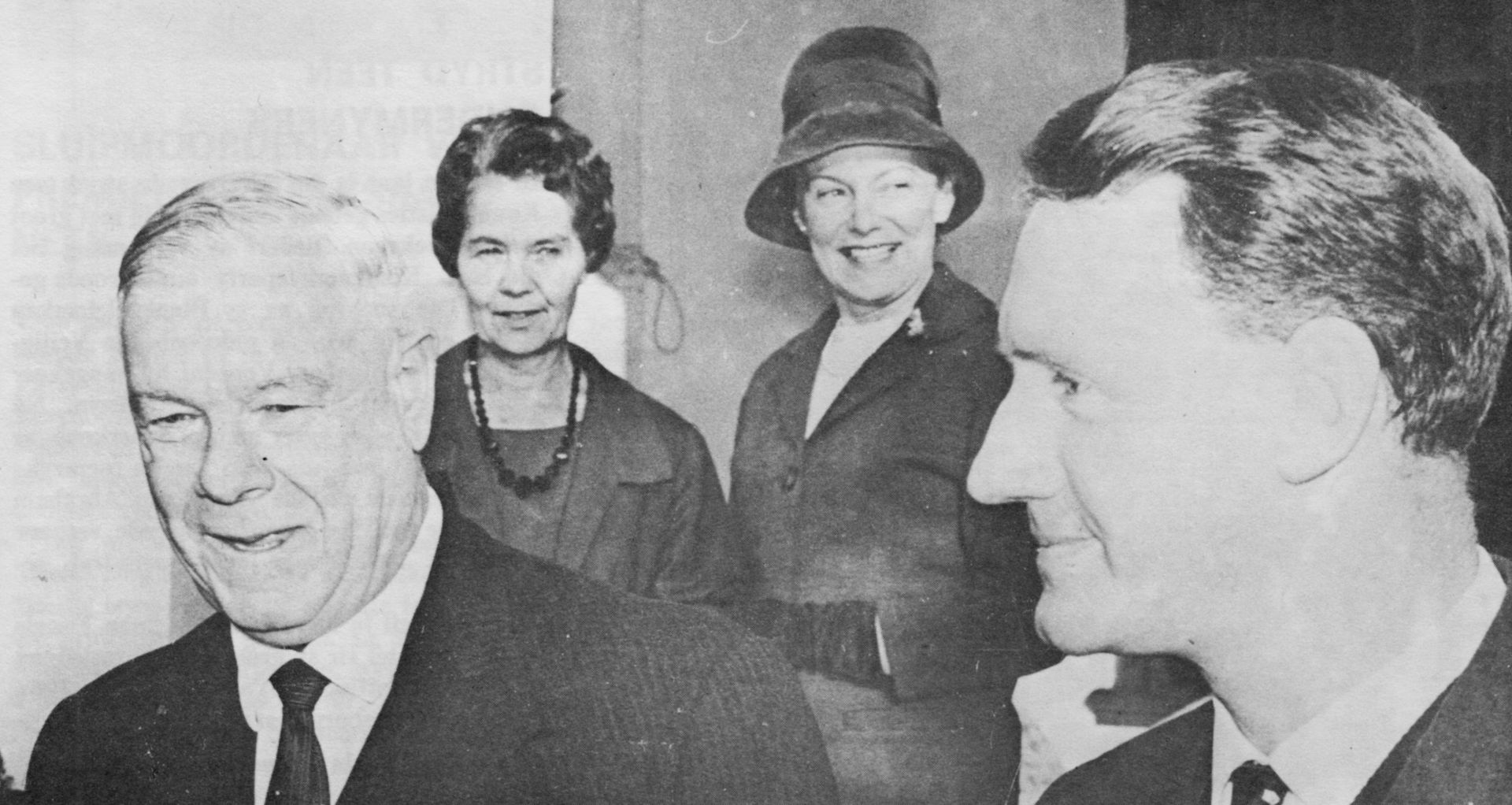
Smith with South African Prime Minister Hendrik Verwoerd in 1964

Smith's appointment as prime minister in April 1964 was met with scepticism by some sections of the Southern Rhodesian press. Former federal prime minister Roy Welensky was discussed as a possible partner in a coalition between the Rhodesian Front (RF) and the United Federal Party (UFP), although he considered such an arrangement unlikely to give him significant influence. British Labour leader Harold Wilson criticised the removal of Winston Field, while the British High Commissioner in Salisbury, John Johnston, initially declined to meet Smith.

Smith took office amid growing conflict between African nationalist organisations. The Zimbabwe African People's Union (ZAPU), led by Joshua Nkomo, had been banned in 1962 and subsequently operated through the People's Caretaker Council (PCC). In August 1963, a faction led by Ndabaningi Sithole broke away to form the Zimbabwe African National Union (ZANU). Both organisations sought African majority rule, but their rivalry led to violent clashes between supporters in black townships.

On 16 April 1964, the government restricted Nkomo and several other PCC leaders to Gonakudzingwa, a remote camp near the Mozambique border. The restrictions followed PCC calls for strikes, demonstrations and a boycott of government schools. Violence continued between nationalist groups and the security forces. On 4 July, members of a ZANU militant group known as the Crocodile Gang killed Pieter Oberholzer near Melsetter. The killing has been identified by historians as an early episode in the Rhodesian Bush War.

On 26 August 1964, Smith's government banned ZANU and the PCC amid political violence and unrest. Nationalist leaders were detained or restricted, the African Daily News was banned, and Highfield township was declared an emergency area. The bans ended the organisations' legal political activities within Southern Rhodesia. ZANU and ZAPU continued operating from abroad, and their armed wings, the Zimbabwe African National Liberation Army (ZANLA) and the Zimbabwe People's Revolutionary Army (ZIPRA), subsequently conducted guerrilla operations against the Rhodesian government.

=== Unilateral Declaration of Independence (UDI) ===
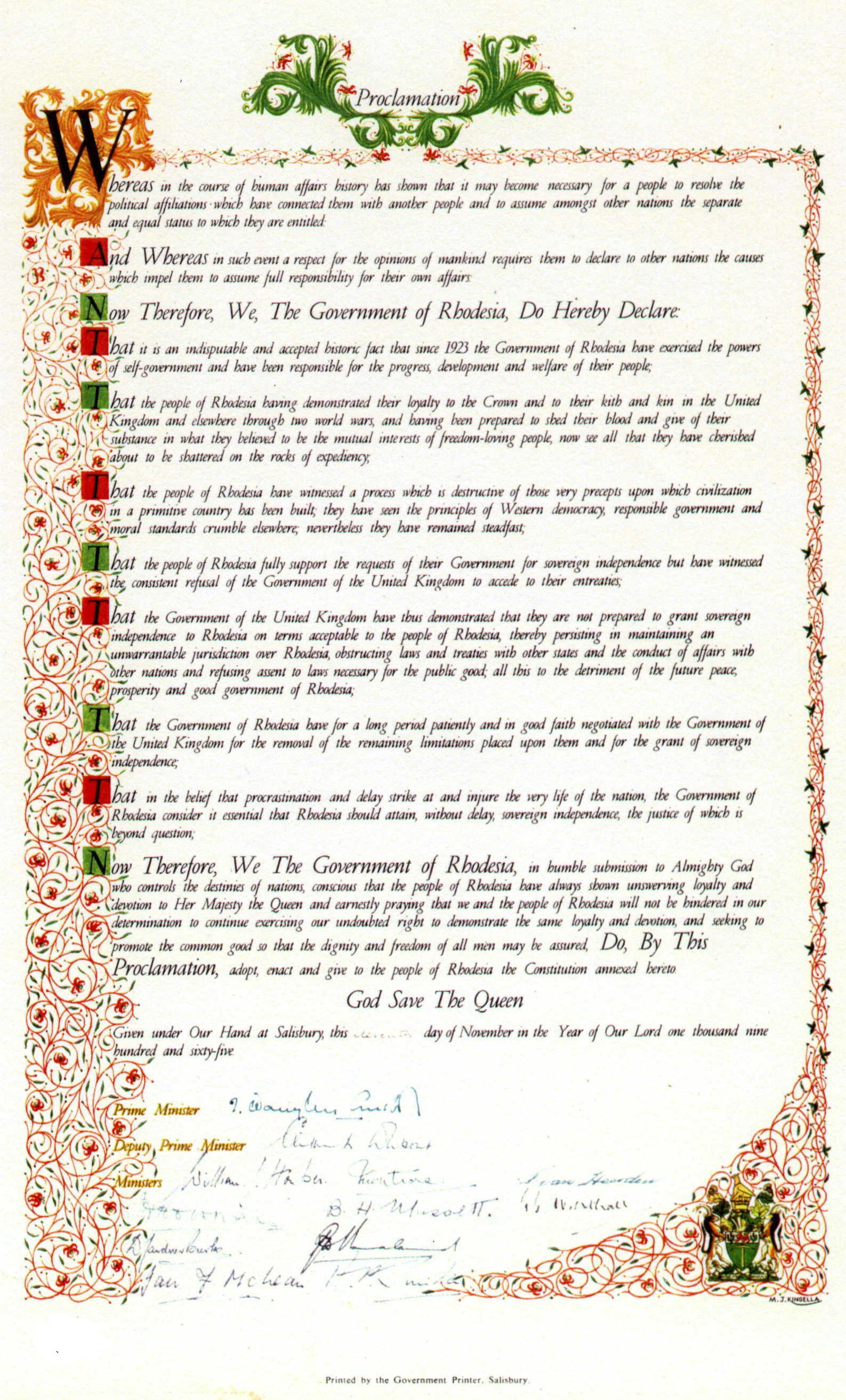
Document of Rhodesia's Unilateral Declaration of Independence signed by Ian Smith and members of his Cabinet

Smith sought independence from Britain under the 1961 constitution, which preserved white-minority political control. The British government required guarantees of progress towards African majority rule, while Smith maintained that the existing constitution provided for gradual political advancement.

Negotiations continued after Harold Wilson's Labour Party came to power in October 1964. Wilson's government established five principles for granting independence: guaranteed progress towards majority rule, safeguards against constitutional changes reversing that progress, improved African political representation, measures to reduce racial discrimination and acceptance of the settlement by Rhodesians as a whole. Smith accepted the principles as a basis for negotiation, but the governments disagreed over their implementation.

In the May 1965 general election, the Rhodesian Front won all 50 predominantly white constituency seats. Smith regarded the result as a mandate to pursue independence, although most black Rhodesians were excluded from those constituencies. Negotiations continued without agreement. Smith visited London in October 1965 for talks with Wilson, who subsequently travelled to Salisbury in a final attempt to reach a settlement.

On 11 November 1965, Smith and his Cabinet issued a Unilateral Declaration of Independence (UDI), declaring Rhodesia independent of Britain. The declaration drew on the American Declaration of Independence and professed continued loyalty to Elizabeth II, whom Smith's government recognised as Queen of Rhodesia. In a televised address, Smith accused Britain of refusing to negotiate an acceptable settlement and defended UDI as necessary to secure Rhodesia's future.

The British government declared UDI illegal. Governor Sir Humphrey Gibbs dismissed Smith and his ministers, but they refused to relinquish office and continued to exercise effective control over Rhodesia. Gibbs remained at Government House as the Crown's representative, while Smith's administration claimed authority under a new constitution.

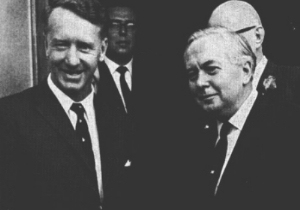
Smith with British Prime Minister Harold Wilson in 1965

UDI received no international recognition. On 12 November, the United Nations Security Council adopted Resolution 216, condemning the declaration and calling on states not to recognise or assist Smith's government. Resolution 217, adopted on 20 November, called for economic measures against Rhodesia, including restrictions on petroleum supplies.

Britain imposed economic sanctions and withdrew its High Commissioner, but Wilson ruled out military intervention. Smith's government remained in power despite international non-recognition, and the constitutional dispute with Britain continued until 1979.

=== Fallout from UDI ===
Britain responded to UDI with economic and financial sanctions intended to compel Smith's government to return to British constitutional authority. Rhodesia lost Commonwealth trade preferences and access to British financial markets, while imports of Rhodesian tobacco and other major exports were prohibited. Britain also sought international support for an oil embargo. Prime Minister Harold Wilson ruled out military intervention, a decision criticised by several African governments that favoured stronger measures against the minority government.

Smith's government retained control of Rhodesia despite the sanctions. It imposed press censorship and continued restrictions on African nationalist organisations, whose leaders were imprisoned, detained or in exile. The Rhodesian Front retained substantial support among white voters, while African nationalist movements opposed the continuation of minority rule. The dispute also affected neighbouring Zambia, whose economy depended heavily on Rhodesian transport routes and trade.

Sanctions reduced Rhodesia's exports and disrupted its economy. A United States government assessment in May 1967 estimated that exports had fallen by approximately 40% between 1965 and 1966. Their effect was limited by continued trade with South Africa and Portuguese-controlled Mozambique. In April 1966, Britain established the Beira Patrol, deploying Royal Navy vessels to intercept oil shipments bound for Rhodesia through the Mozambican port of Beira.

Following the failure of Anglo-Rhodesian negotiations in December 1966, Britain pursued mandatory sanctions through the United Nations Security Council. Resolution 232, adopted on 16 December 1966, restricted selected Rhodesian exports and imports, including petroleum products. The sanctions were extended by Resolution 253 in May 1968. Although they substantially reduced Rhodesia's international trade, they did not force Smith's government to relinquish power.

=== Tiger and Fearless talks with Wilson ===
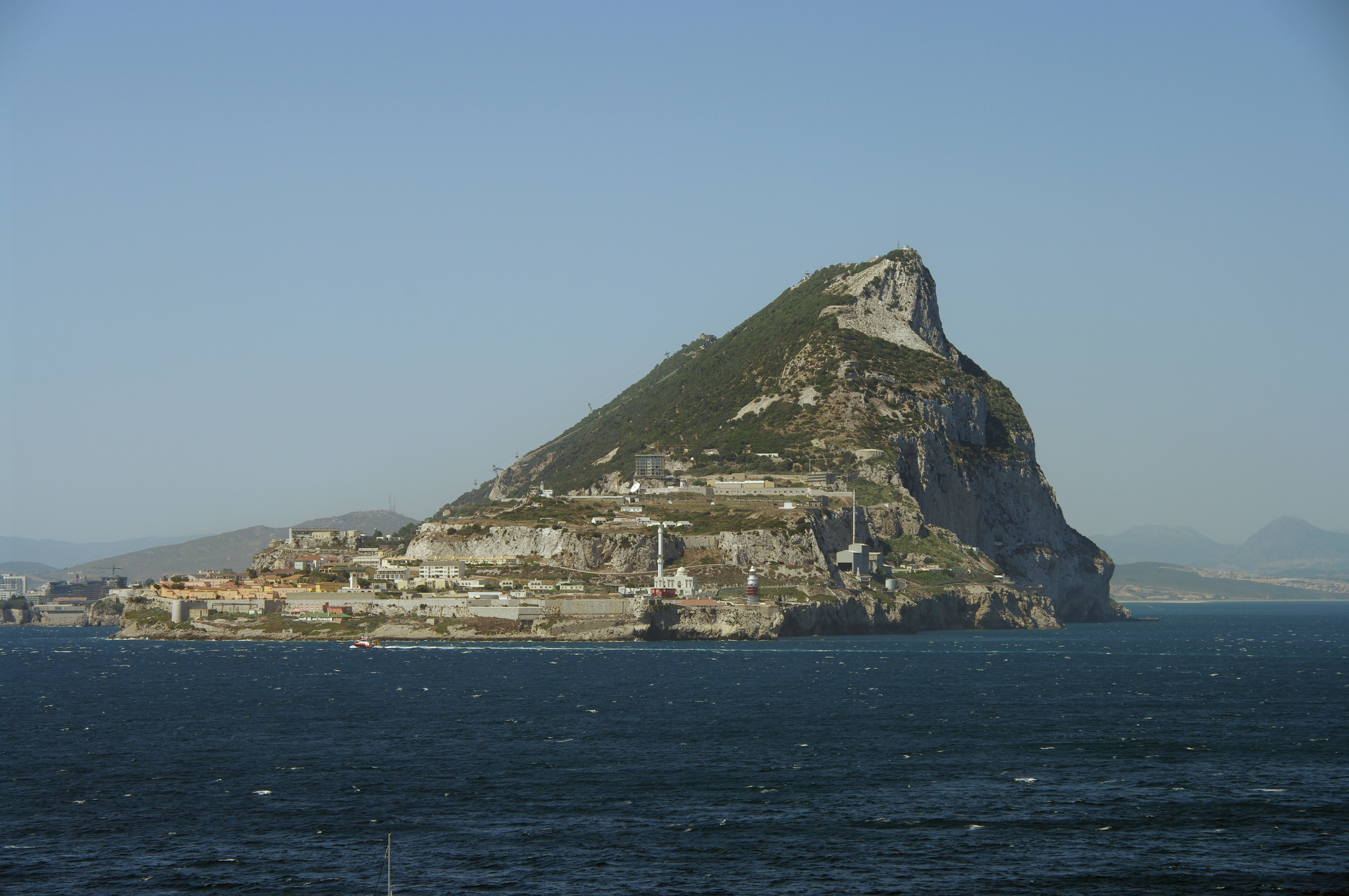
Gibraltar, where Smith and Wilson held talks in 1966 and 1968

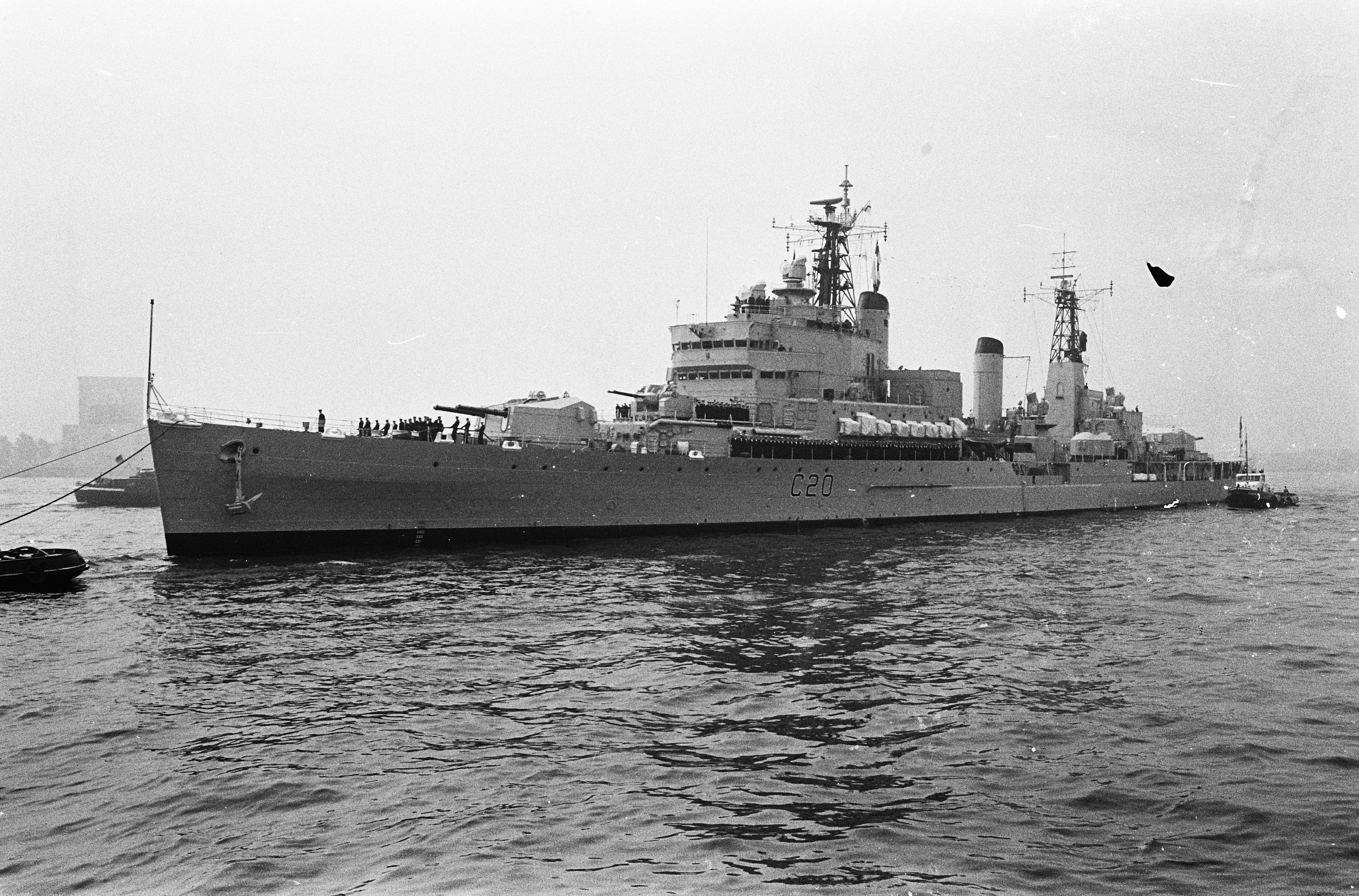
HMS Tiger, which hosted the 1966 Anglo-Rhodesian summit off Gibraltar

In January 1966, Wilson told the House of Commons that he would not negotiate with Smith's government unless it abandoned its claim to independence. British and Rhodesian officials nevertheless began preliminary discussions in London and Salisbury later that year. By November, Wilson had agreed to meet Smith personally. The two prime ministers subsequently held negotiations aboard Royal Navy ships off Gibraltar, first on HMS Tiger from 2 to 4 December 1966, and again on HMS Fearless from 8 to 13 October 1968.

The atmosphere aboard Tiger was strained. Wilson's political secretary, Marcia Falkender, later described the separation of the British and Rhodesian delegations outside the conference room as "apartheid ... on that ship". (Note: Wilson formally greeted the British-appointed governor, Humphrey Gibbs, but not Smith. British ministers and officials occupied the ship's senior officers' cabins, while the Rhodesian delegation was accommodated in petty officers' quarters.) Accounts from both delegations described Wilson's dealings with Smith as terse.

The principal disagreement concerned the transition to a constitutional settlement. Wilson proposed replacing the 1965 constitution with an interim multiracial administration operating under a British-appointed governor. A new constitution would follow a further test of public opinion. Smith opposed surrendering the existing government's authority before the terms of a replacement constitution had been settled. On 3 December, he insisted that any agreement required the approval of his Cabinet in Salisbury. Wilson maintained that both prime ministers had been expected to possess authority to conclude an agreement. (Note: Smith disputed the suggestion that he had agreed to negotiate with full authority, although he later acknowledged that he could have concluded an agreement had he considered its terms acceptable.)

A provisional working document was signed by Smith, Wilson and Gibbs, subject to acceptance by the British and Rhodesian cabinets. It provided for independence before majority rule, constitutional safeguards for progress towards majority rule and a temporary restoration of British authority. The British Cabinet accepted the proposals, but Smith's Cabinet rejected them on 5 December, objecting particularly to the proposed interim administration under the governor.

Rhodesia's Leader of the Opposition, Josiah Gondo, called for Smith's resignation, arguing that the Cabinet's rejection of a document negotiated by Smith amounted to a vote of no confidence. The Rhodesian Front did not act on the demand. Britain subsequently reaffirmed its position that independence would not be granted before majority rule and secured mandatory United Nations sanctions against Rhodesia.

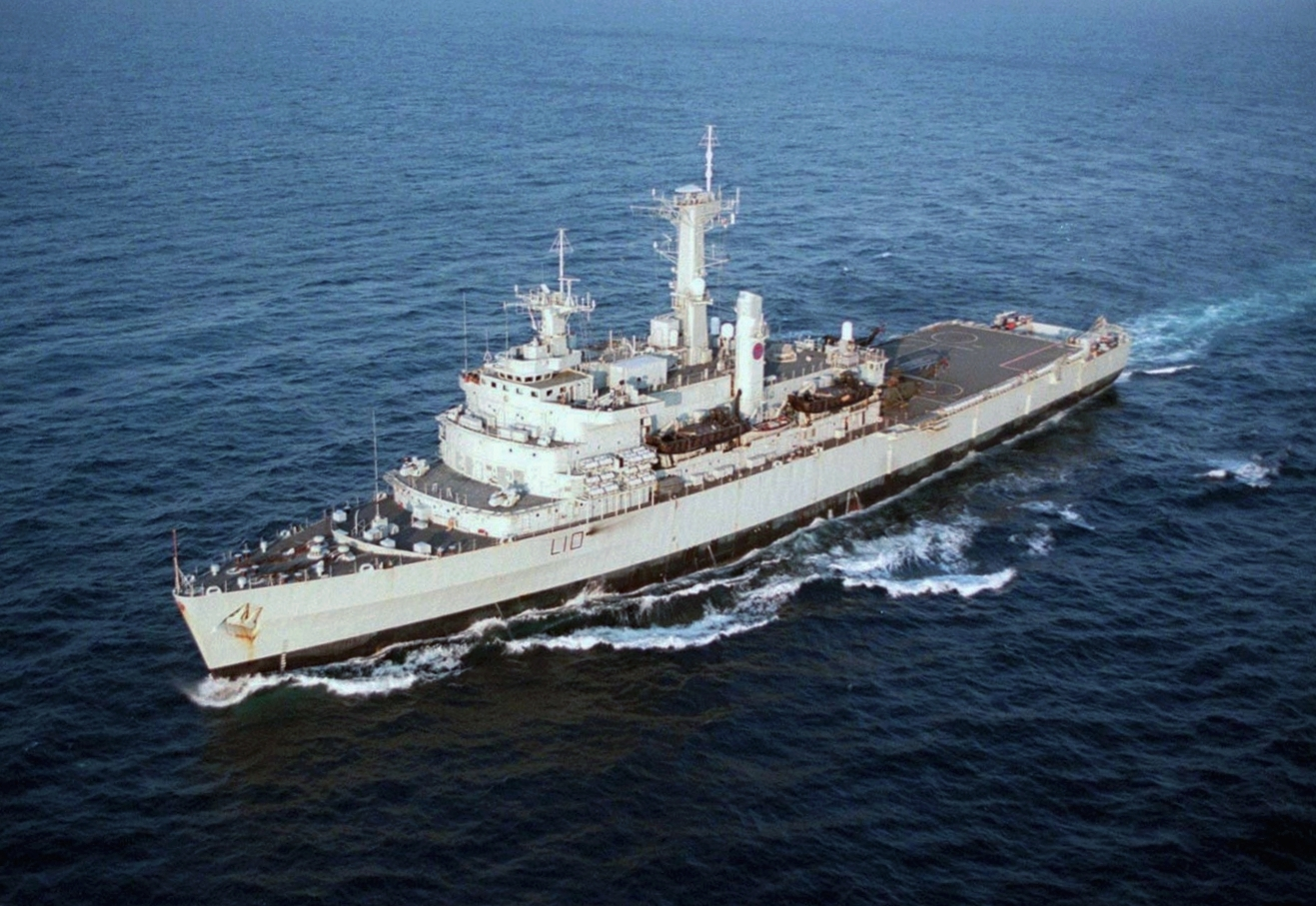
HMS Fearless, which hosted the 1968 Anglo-Rhodesian summit off Gibraltar

In April 1968, Smith's government lifted the press censorship introduced at UDI, although it retained powers to restrict the publication of information. On 13 September, the Rhodesian High Court, in a judgment delivered by a panel headed by Sir Hugh Beadle, recognised UDI, the 1965 constitution and Smith's government as de jure lawful. (Note: The judgment drew on Hugo Grotius's argument that the purposes of governing and destroying a government were incompatible. The judges also questioned Britain's decision to involve the United Nations, reasoning that an unlawful UDI would have remained a domestic constitutional matter.) British Commonwealth Secretary George Thomson condemned the ruling as contrary to Rhodesia's constitutional law.

At the October 1968 talks aboard Fearless, the British delegation adopted a less formal approach than at the previous summit. Smith was accommodated in the admiral's cabin aboard HMS Kent, moored alongside. Wilson abandoned his earlier demand for a transitional period under a British governor, but proposed a constitutional arrangement known as the "double safeguard". This would give elected black representatives a blocking minority of one-quarter of the seats in the Rhodesian parliament and permit appeals against legislation to the Privy Council in London. Smith's delegation accepted the principle of a blocking minority but disagreed with the British proposals for its operation. Smith also rejected the proposed role of the Privy Council as incompatible with Rhodesian sovereignty.

The summit ended without an agreement. A joint statement acknowledged that substantial differences remained, although both governments expressed willingness to continue negotiations in Salisbury. No further talks between Smith and Wilson took place.

=== A republic; failed accord with Douglas-Home ===
Rhodesian Sky Blue Ensign, used until 1968 (Note: This overall design dated back to 1923, but a darker blue field was used until 1964, when the shade was lightened to make the Rhodesian flag more recognisable.)

Rhodesian green-and-white triband, adopted in 1968

Following the failure of the Tiger talks in December 1966, Smith's government began considering the establishment of a republic, abandoning its claim to remain a Commonwealth realm. Supporters of the change argued that it would clarify Rhodesia's constitutional position and improve its prospects of obtaining international recognition. The government began preparing a republican constitution in March 1967. On 11 November 1968, the third anniversary of UDI, Rhodesia replaced its Sky Blue Ensign, incorporating the Union Jack, with a green-white-green triband bearing the national coat of arms.

In June 1969, voters approved a new constitution and the establishment of a republic in the constitutional referendum. Smith proclaimed the republic on 2 March 1970. The constitution replaced the monarch with a president as head of state and established a bicameral parliament with a multiracial senate. It retained separate electoral rolls for black and white voters, subject to different qualifications. Black representation in the House of Assembly was to increase according to the proportion of income tax paid by black citizens, but could not exceed that of white members. The government's stated objective was racial parity in parliamentary representation rather than majority rule.

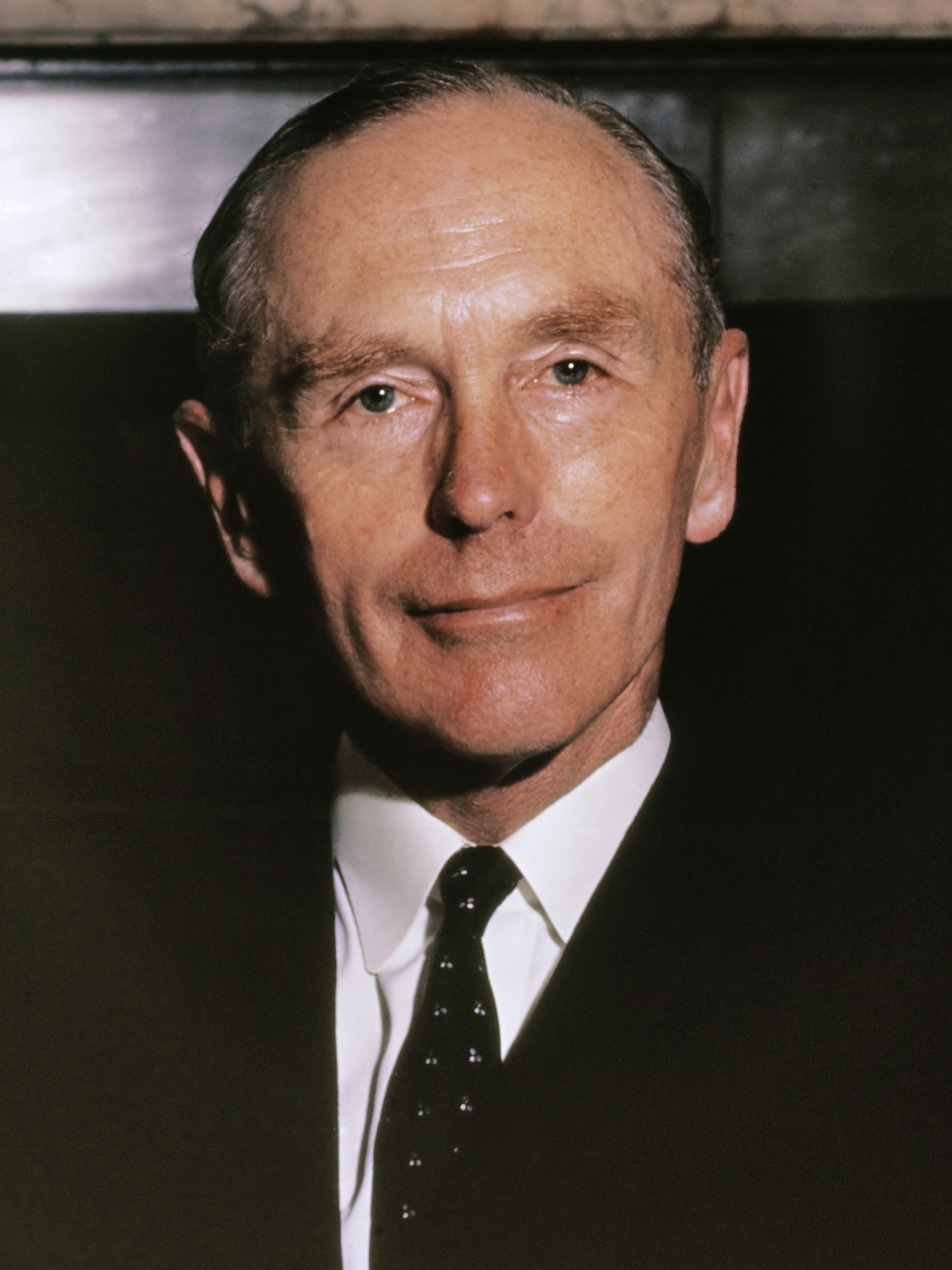
British Foreign Secretary Sir Alec Douglas-Home, who negotiated a proposed settlement with Smith in 1971

No country recognised the Rhodesian republic. In the general election on 10 April 1970, the Rhodesian Front won all 50 seats elected by the predominantly white electorate. The election of a Conservative government in Britain two months later renewed prospects for negotiations. Edward Heath became prime minister and Alec Douglas-Home was appointed Foreign Secretary.

Smith and Douglas-Home held discussions in Salisbury in April 1971 and continued negotiations over the following months. On 15 November, Douglas-Home returned with a British delegation that included Attorney General Sir Peter Rawlinson. After six days of talks, the two governments agreed on proposed settlement terms on 21 November.

The proposals retained much of the 1969 constitution but provided for a gradual increase in black parliamentary representation, intended eventually to produce majority rule. Black representation would increase immediately, and constitutional provisions would prevent legislation reducing existing safeguards without the approval of both black and white MPs. Historian Robert Blake noted that the arrangement would give black members an effective veto if they voted together. Smith later defended the proposals as providing for majority rule while avoiding an immediate transition to universal adult suffrage. Critics questioned how long the proposed electoral arrangements would preserve white political control.

The agreement was conditional on Britain determining that its terms were acceptable to the Rhodesian population as a whole. The British government appointed the Pearce Commission, chaired by Lord Pearce, to conduct the inquiry. (Note: The other commissioners were Sir Maurice Dorman, a former Governor-General of Malta; Sir Glyn Smallwood Jones, the last Governor-General of Malawi; and Lord Harlech.) Acceptance by the country's principal racial communities was considered necessary for the settlement to proceed.

Supporters of ZANU and ZAPU, whose senior leaders remained detained or imprisoned, joined with church leaders and other opponents of the settlement to organise a campaign against the proposals. They established the African National Council (ANC), led by Bishop Abel Muzorewa, which became a prominent organisation in African nationalist politics.

The Pearce Commission completed its inquiry in March 1972 and published its findings in May. It reported that the proposals were supported by most white, coloured and Asian Rhodesians, but rejected by a majority of black Africans. The commissioners concluded that the Rhodesian population as a whole had not accepted the proposed settlement. They also found that most people who had expressed opinions understood the proposals sufficiently to judge them, and that the evidence of intimidation did not invalidate the finding of majority African opposition.

Smith criticised the commission's methods and described its members as "naive and inept". (Note: Journalist Phillippa Berlyn, who accompanied the commission, argued that its members had consulted too few black Rhodesians and had failed to explain the proposals adequately. She also alleged intimidation by African nationalists and questioned the conduct of some British officials.) Britain accepted the commission's findings and did not implement the settlement. Douglas-Home nevertheless stated that the proposals remained available because Smith had neither withdrawn nor amended them.

=== Bush War ===
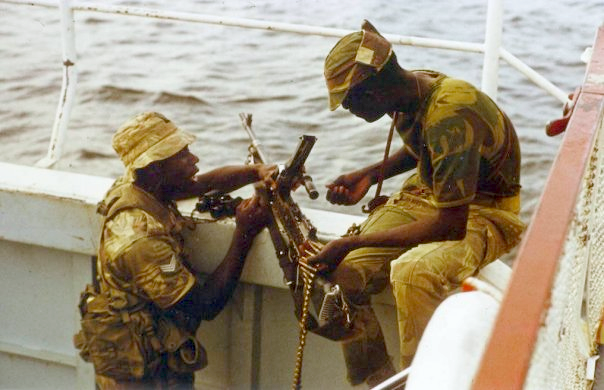
Rhodesian Army soldiers on Lake Kariba in 1976, during the Bush War

In an April 1975 speech, Smith warns Rhodesians against placing too much confidence in détente, referring to the fall of Saigon.

The Rhodesian Bush War, also known as the Second Chimurenga, had begun before UDI but intensified in December 1972, when the Zimbabwe African National Liberation Army (ZANLA), the armed wing of ZANU, attacked farms in north-eastern Rhodesia. The Rhodesian Security Forces conducted counter-insurgency operations over the following two years. In August 1973, Bishop Abel Muzorewa resumed negotiations with Smith and accepted the terms of the proposed 1971 Anglo-Rhodesian settlement. The two signed a statement on 17 August, but the executive of the United African National Council (UANC) repudiated the agreement in May 1974. Talks between Smith and Muzorewa nevertheless continued intermittently. In the July 1974 general election, the Rhodesian Front again won all 50 seats elected by the predominantly white electorate.

Rhodesia's regional position deteriorated following the Carnation Revolution in Portugal in April 1974. Portuguese withdrawal from Mozambique led to the territory's independence in June 1975 under a government aligned with ZANU, depriving Rhodesia of a neighbouring administration that had previously assisted its security operations. The change increased Rhodesia's dependence on South Africa, while the return of Harold Wilson's Labour government in Britain in March 1974 brought renewed diplomatic pressure. Smith maintained that his government could withstand the pressure. Addressing a Rhodesian Front congress on 20 September 1974, he declared that a settlement was desirable, "but only on our terms".

In December 1974, South African Prime Minister B. J. Vorster pressed Smith to participate in a regional détente initiative involving Zambia, Tanzania and Botswana. Vorster regarded continued white minority rule in Rhodesia as increasingly difficult to sustain and sought improved relations with black African governments. The initiative provided for a ceasefire and the release of detained ZANU and ZAPU leaders to facilitate negotiations under the UANC's auspices. Disagreements over compliance with the ceasefire and the release of prisoners soon disrupted the process. South Africa increased pressure on Smith by withdrawing South African Police personnel who had assisted Rhodesian security operations. (Note: In December 1974, ZANLA guerrillas led by Herbert Shungu killed six unarmed policemen, including five South Africans, after inviting them to discuss the guerrillas' surrender.) Smith continued to reject an immediate transfer of power to a black majority government, advocating instead a franchise based on voter qualifications.

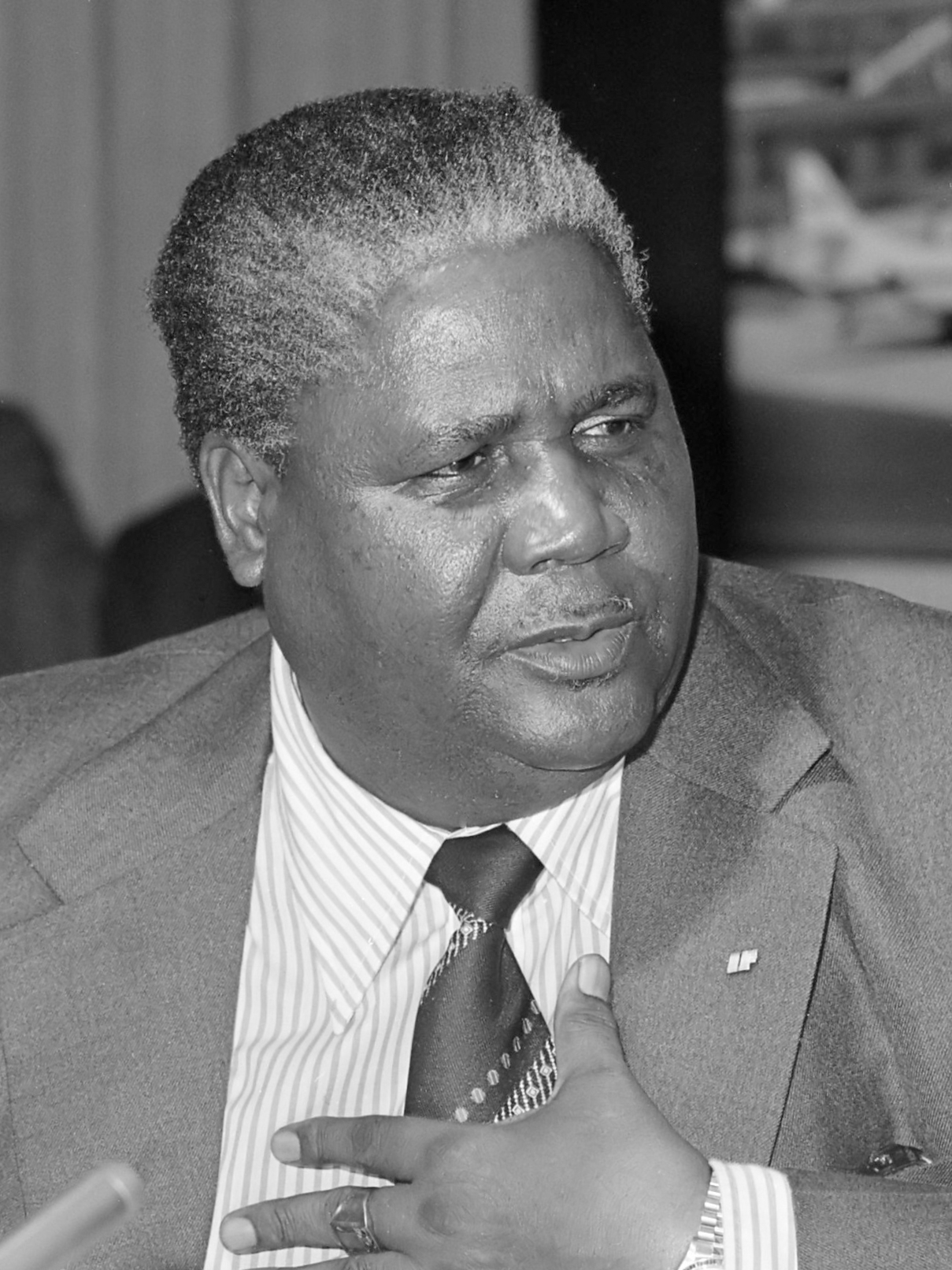
Joshua Nkomo, leader of ZAPU, one of the principal African nationalist organisations

Joshua Nkomo remained leader of ZAPU, while ZANU experienced a leadership struggle between its founding president, the Reverend Ndabaningi Sithole, and Robert Mugabe, who had gained support within the organisation while imprisoned. Following their release in December 1974, Mugabe travelled to Mozambique to consolidate his position within ZANU, while Sithole joined Muzorewa's negotiating delegation.

The parties disagreed over the location of the proposed constitutional conference. African nationalist representatives opposed meeting on Rhodesian territory, while Smith's government insisted that negotiations take place within the country. A compromise placed the conference aboard a train on the Victoria Falls Bridge, straddling the Rhodesia–Zambia border. The meeting on 26 August 1975, mediated by Vorster and Zambian President Kenneth Kaunda, ended without agreement. Smith subsequently held separate negotiations with Nkomo in Salisbury, but rejected Nkomo's proposal for an immediate transition to an interim government headed by Nkomo. Guerrilla activity intensified during the first months of 1976.

In a televised address on 20 March 1976, Smith declared: "I don't believe in majority rule ever in Rhodesia—not in 1,000 years." He also spoke of the need for black and white Rhodesians to share political power. The statement became widely cited as evidence of his opposition to majority rule. Journalist Peter Godwin later interpreted the remark as an attempt to reassure Rhodesian Front supporters opposed to any transfer of political power, rather than an absolute rejection of future power-sharing. Smith's biographer Phillippa Berlyn regarded the statement as a serious political mistake, irrespective of his intended meaning.

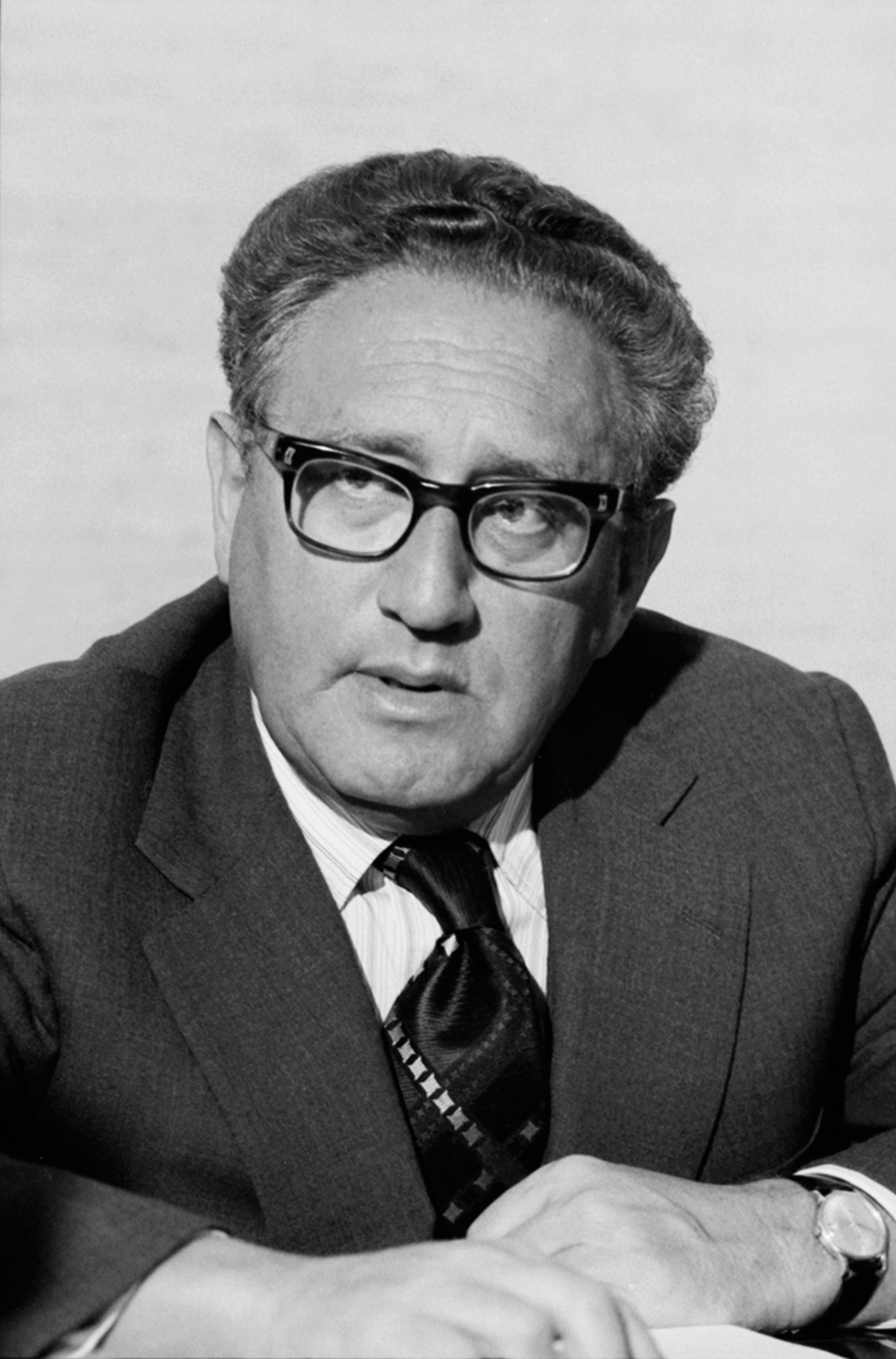
Henry Kissinger, the United States Secretary of State, who helped secure Smith's acceptance of a proposed transition to majority rule in 1976

In February 1976, United States Secretary of State Henry Kissinger became directly involved in efforts to negotiate a Rhodesian settlement. He held discussions with Britain, South Africa and the African Frontline States as part of an Anglo-American diplomatic initiative. On 18 September, Kissinger met Smith in Pretoria and proposed a transition to majority rule within two years. Smith initially resisted the proposal but accepted it on 24 September, following pressure from Vorster and the possibility that South Africa would reduce its financial and military assistance. His acceptance marked the first public commitment by his government to a transition based on universal adult suffrage and majority rule.

The proposed settlement subsequently encountered opposition from the Frontline States, which rejected aspects of the transition arrangements. Britain convened a constitutional conference in Geneva in an attempt to reach an agreement. ZANU and ZAPU participated under the joint designation Patriotic Front, although they remained separate organisations. The Geneva Conference, held from October to December 1976 under British mediation, ended without a settlement.

=== Internal Settlement and Lancaster House; becoming Zimbabwe ===
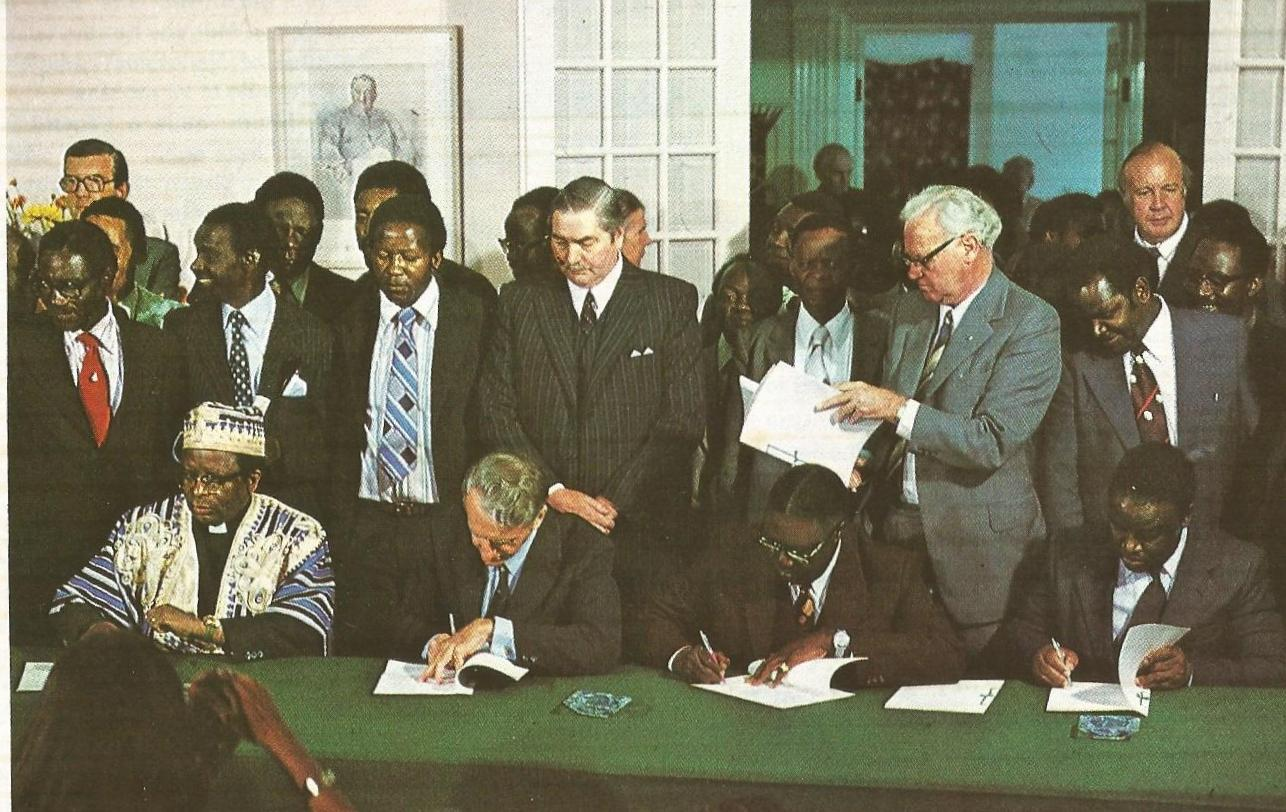
Smith signing the Rhodesian Internal Settlement in 1978

Smith's moves towards a settlement with black-nationalist groups prompted outrage in sections of Rhodesian Front's right wing, but he remained unassailable within the party as a whole, which had in late 1975 granted him a mandate to negotiate for the best possible settlement however he saw fit. The split in the party ultimately led to the defection in July 1977 of 12 RF MPs after Smith introduced legislation to remove racial criteria from the Land Tenure Act. (Note: The Land Apportionment Act had been slightly reformed and thus renamed in 1969.)

The loss of these seats to the breakaway Rhodesian Action Party, which opposed any conciliation with black nationalists, meant that Smith now only barely had the two-thirds majority in parliament he would need to change the constitution, as he would have to in the event of a settlement. He therefore called an early election, and on 31 August 1977 roundly defeated the defectors—"the dirty dozen", the RF called them—as well as all other opposition; for the third time in seven years, the RF had won all 50 white seats. The party revolt turned out to be a blessing in disguise for Smith, Berlyn comments, as it allowed him to "shed the dead wood of the right wing", giving him more freedom in negotiations with the nationalists. The need for a settlement was becoming urgent—the war was escalating sharply, white emigration was climbing and the economy was starting to struggle as the UN sanctions finally began to have a serious effect.

In March 1978, Smith and non-militant nationalist groups headed by Muzorewa, Sithole and Chief Jeremiah Chirau agreed what became the "Internal Settlement", under which the country would be reconstituted as Zimbabwe Rhodesia in June 1979 after multiracial elections. ZANU and ZAPU were invited to participate, but refused; Nkomo sardonically dubbed Smith's black colleagues "the blacksmiths". The deal was badly received abroad, partly because it kept the police, the military, the judiciary and the civil service in white hands. There would be a senate of 20 blacks and 10 whites, and whites would be reserved 28 out of 100 seats in the new House of Assembly. (Note: Whites would elect 20 of these on a separate electoral roll; these 20 MPs would then nominate a list of 16 candidates from whom eight would be elected by all registered voters.) Smith and Nkomo re-entered negotiations in August 1978, but these ended after ZIPRA shot down an Air Rhodesia passenger flight on 3 September and massacred survivors at the crash site. Smith cut off talks, introduced martial law across most of the country and ordered reprisal attacks on guerrilla positions. Smith, Muzorewa and Sithole toured the United States in October 1978 to promote their settlement, and met Kissinger, Ford and others including the future president Ronald Reagan. On 11 December, ZANLA attacked Salisbury's oil storage depot, causing a fire that lasted six days and destroyed a quarter of Rhodesia's fuel. Two months later ZIPRA downed another civilian flight, this time killing all on board.

After whites endorsed the Internal Settlement by 85% in a referendum on 30 January 1979, Smith dissolved the Rhodesian parliament for the last time on 28 February. The RF won all the white seats in the April 1979 elections while Muzorewa and the UANC won a majority in the common roll seats with 67% of the popular vote; the PF rejected this, however, as did the UN, which passed a resolution branding it a "sham". Sithole, astounded that his party had won only 12 seats to the UANC's 51, suddenly turned against the settlement and alleged that the polls had been stage-managed in Muzorewa's favour. Mugabe dismissed the bishop as a "neocolonial puppet" and pledged to continue ZANLA's campaign "to the last man"; Nkomo similarly committed himself to ZIPRA. On 1 June 1979, the day of the country's official reconstitution as Zimbabwe Rhodesia, Muzorewa replaced Smith as prime minister, at the head of a UANC–RF coalition Cabinet made up of 12 blacks and five whites. Smith was included as Minister without portfolio; Nkomo promptly dubbed him the "Minister with all the portfolios".

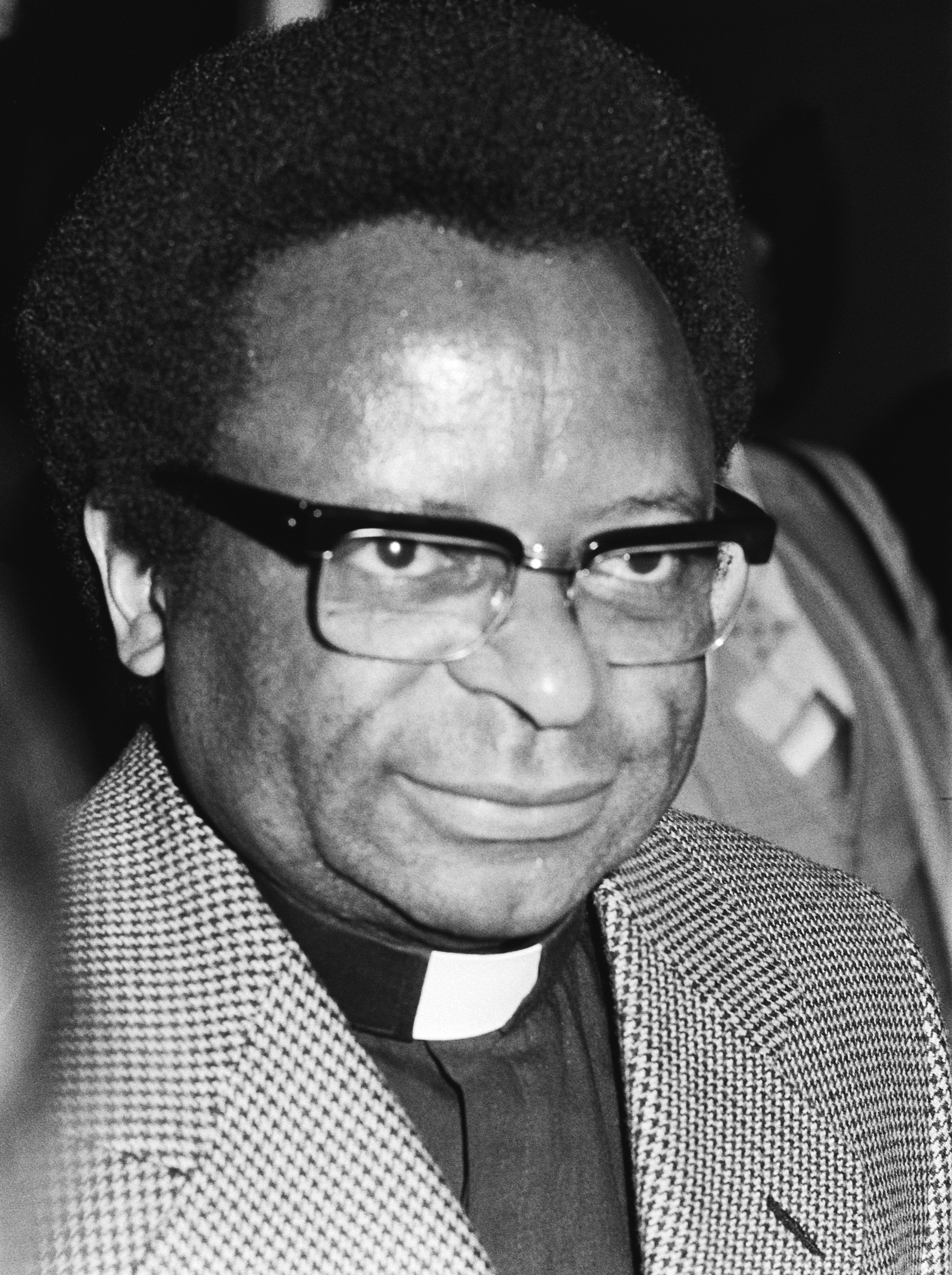
Bishop Abel Muzorewa, the country's first black prime minister, who succeeded Smith in June 1979 following the Internal Settlement

An observer group from the UK Conservative Party did regard the April 1979 elections as fair, and Margaret Thatcher, the Conservative leader, was personally disposed to recognise Muzorewa's government and lift sanctions. The potential significance of the Conservative victory in the May 1979 British general election was not lost on Smith, who wrote to Thatcher: "All Rhodesians thank God for your magnificent victory." The United States Senate passed a resolution urging President Carter to remove sanctions and declare Zimbabwe Rhodesia legitimate, but Carter and his Cabinet remained strongly opposed. Carter and Thatcher ultimately decided against accepting Zimbabwe Rhodesia, noting the continued international support for the guerrillas. After the Commonwealth Heads of Government Meeting in Lusaka in August 1979, the UK Foreign Secretary Lord Carrington invited the Zimbabwe Rhodesian government and the Patriotic Front to attend an all-party constitutional conference at Lancaster House in London, starting on 10 September.

Smith was part of Muzorewa's delegation at Lancaster House. Several aspects of the Internal Settlement constitution, such as a declaration of human rights and a guarantee that land redistributed by the government would be paid for, were retained; it was also agreed to have 20 reserved white seats out of 100 for at least seven years. Fresh elections would be held during a brief period under a British governor invested with full executive and legislative powers. The new constitution was agreed on 18 October, and on 12 December 1979 the House of Assembly voted to dissolve itself, ending UDI. Lord Soames arrived in Salisbury later the same day to become Southern Rhodesia's last Governor; among other things he announced that Smith would be granted amnesty for declaring independence. The final Lancaster House Agreement was signed on 21 December. Smith was the only member of any delegation to openly oppose the accords; he refused to attend the signing ceremony and boycotted the post-agreement party, instead having dinner with former RAF comrades and Group Captain Sir Douglas Bader.

The UK government and the international community ultimately declared the February 1980 general election free and fair, though many observers attested to widespread political violence and intimidation of voters, particularly by ZANU (which added Patriotic Front to its name to become "ZANU–PF"). British monitors in the ZANU–PF-dominated eastern provinces were strongly critical, reporting "brutal 'disciplinary murders' as examples of the fate awaiting those who failed to conform", name-taking and "claims to the possession of machines which would reveal how individuals had voted". The Commonwealth Observer Group acknowledged that irregularities were occurring but ruled that accounts were exaggerated. After the RF won all 20 white seats, Soames announced late on 4 March 1980 that Mugabe and ZANU–PF had won 57 of the 80 common roll seats, giving them a majority in the new House of Assembly.

Mugabe invited Smith to his house that evening and according to Smith treated him "most courteously"; Mugabe expressed joy at inheriting a "wonderful country" with modern infrastructure and a viable economy, outlined plans for gradual reform that Smith found reasonable, and said that he hoped to stay in regular contact. This meeting had a profound effect on the former prime minister. Having denounced Mugabe as an "apostle of Satan" before the election, Smith now publicly endorsed him as "sober and responsible". "If this were a true picture, then there could be hope instead of despair," he recalled in his autobiography. "When I got home I said to Janet that I hoped it was not an hallucination."

== Opposition ==
=== First years under Mugabe ===
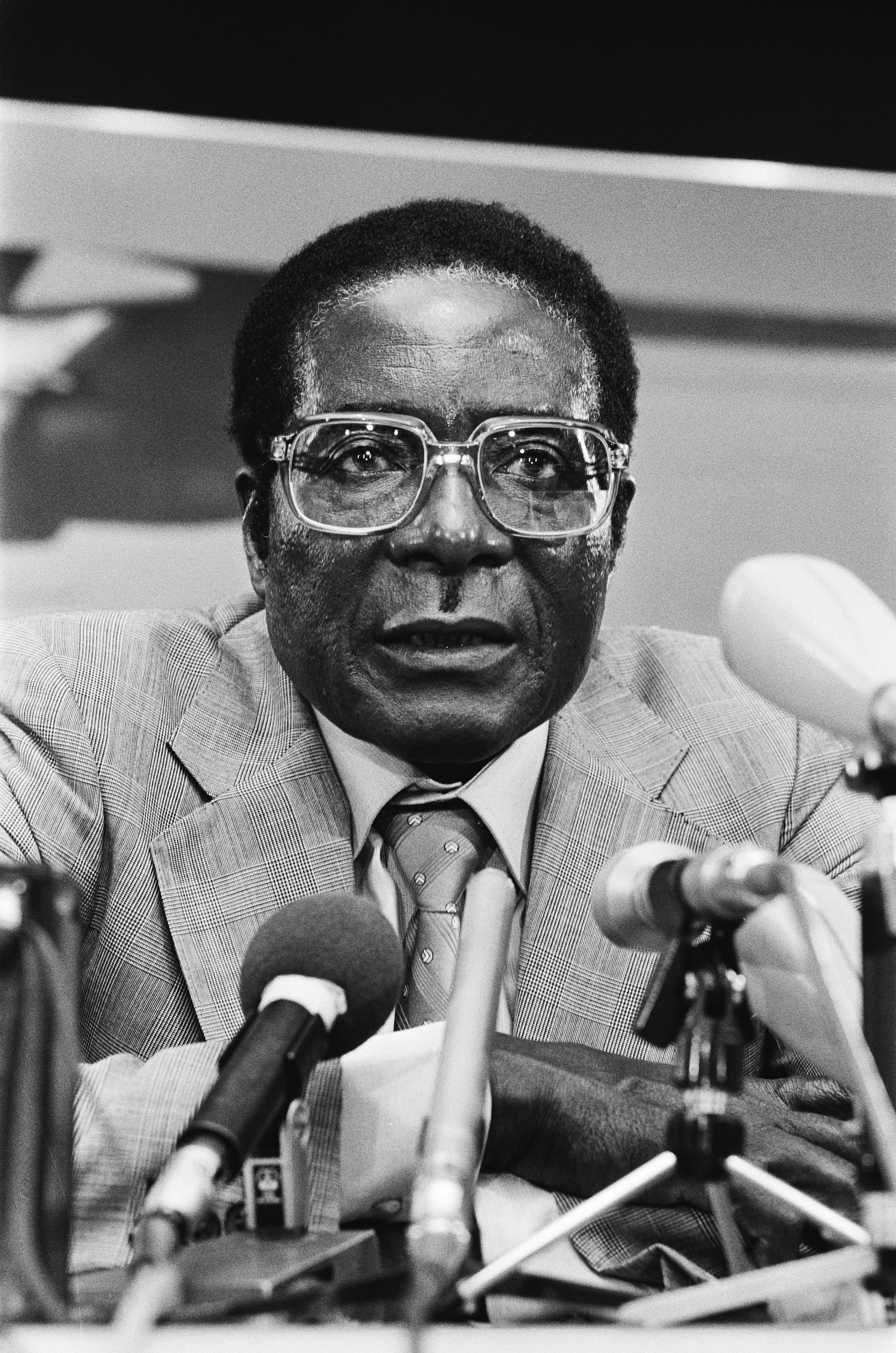
Robert Mugabe, who became prime minister in 1980, with Smith serving as Leader of the Opposition

The Parliament of Zimbabwe opened on 15 May 1980, a month after independence, with Smith as Leader of the Opposition. Mugabe and Smith entered the House together, followed by their respective MPs, in a gesture that historian Martin Meredith interpreted as reflecting the government's initial policy of reconciliation. Smith urged white Zimbabweans not to emigrate and to give the new government an opportunity to govern. Nevertheless, more than half of Zimbabwe's white population left during the first three years of independence.

Mugabe initially sought the cooperation of white commercial farmers, who accounted for much of Zimbabwe's agricultural production. Many supported his government during the favourable economic conditions of the early 1980s. Smith's relations with Mugabe deteriorated in 1981 after he criticised the prime minister's advocacy of a one-party state, arguing that it discouraged foreign investment. According to Smith, Mugabe subsequently refused to meet him.

The Rhodesian Front, renamed the Republican Front in 1981, represented the interests of much of the remaining white electorate. Smith opposed Mugabe's plans for a one-party system and accused his administration of corruption and mismanagement. Relations between the government and white opposition worsened amid allegations of South African espionage. Several white Zimbabweans were arrested and some were tortured. Smith criticised their detention without trial under emergency legislation, while ZANU–PF MPs pointed out that the same powers had been used to detain African nationalists under Smith's government.

During a visit to Britain and the United States in November 1982, Smith accused Mugabe of establishing a Marxist–Leninist dictatorship. Following his return, police questioned those attending an art exhibition at which he was guest of honour, searched his properties and confiscated his passport. The government cited his criticism of Zimbabwe abroad, while Smith described the measures as intimidation. Some Republican Front MPs subsequently left the party, disagreeing with Smith's confrontational approach to the government.

Smith experienced health problems during this period. He collapsed in Parliament in June 1982 and later sought treatment in South Africa for a circulatory condition. Unable to travel without his Zimbabwean passport, he obtained a British passport in April 1983. He maintained that Zimbabwe was his home and that he wished to recover his Zimbabwean documents, which were eventually returned. In 1984, he announced his intention to renounce British citizenship to comply with Zimbabwe's restrictions on dual nationality, although British authorities did not accept his attempted renunciation.

=== Gukurahundi; last years in politics ===
Relations between ZANU–PF and ZAPU deteriorated after Mugabe dismissed Joshua Nkomo from the government in February 1982, accusing him and ZAPU of plotting a coup. In 1983, the government deployed the North Korean-trained 5th Brigade to Matabeleland, where it carried out mass killings and other abuses against civilians suspected of supporting dissidents. The campaign became known as Gukurahundi. Estimates of the number killed between 1983 and 1987 vary, with some accounts placing the toll between 10,000 and 30,000.

Nkomo fled to Britain in March 1983, while Ndabaningi Sithole went into exile in the United States. Bishop Abel Muzorewa remained in Zimbabwe but was detained later that year on allegations of links with South Africa. Nkomo accused Mugabe's government of committing genocide; Mugabe rejected reports of abuses and blamed hostile foreign journalists.

Smith remained politically active. On 21 July 1984, he renamed the Republican Front the Conservative Alliance of Zimbabwe (CAZ), removed its racial membership restrictions and invited black Zimbabweans to join. In the 1985 parliamentary election, the CAZ won 15 of the 20 seats reserved for white voters, including Smith's constituency of Bulawayo Central. Mugabe denounced the result as a rejection of racial reconciliation and renewed his commitment to abolishing the reserved seats.

Relations between Smith and Mugabe worsened further in November 1985 after Smith criticised the government's educational qualifications in a BBC interview. Mugabe responded in Parliament by calling him an "incorrigible racist" who "should long ago have been hanged and hanged publicly". Later that month, Smith's friend and former political associate "Boss" Lilford was murdered at his farm. Smith declined to speculate publicly about the motive. (Note: Lilford was found beaten and shot, with his hands bound. A car taken from the property was subsequently recovered in Chitungwiza.)

In February 1987, Information Minister Nathan Shamuyarira accused Smith of acting as a "fifth columnist" after he advised South African businessmen that their country could withstand economic sanctions. Smith was subsequently suspended from Parliament for a year over his statements in South Africa and criticism of ZANU–PF. He resigned as CAZ leader in May 1987. The government also suspended his parliamentary salary, a decision the Supreme Court of Zimbabwe ruled unconstitutional in 1989.

Smith's parliamentary career ended in September 1987 when the government abolished the 20 seats reserved for white voters under the Lancaster House Agreement. Further constitutional changes abolished the office of prime minister, and Mugabe became executive president in December. That month, Mugabe and Nkomo signed the Unity Accord, which provided for the merger of ZAPU into ZANU–PF.

Gerald Smith, who was unrelated to Ian Smith, succeeded him as CAZ leader. Smith nevertheless remained involved in opposition politics. In July 1992, he chaired discussions among the CAZ, Muzorewa's UANC, Sithole's ZANU–Ndonga and Edgar Tekere's Zimbabwe Unity Movement. The parties formed the United Front, with Smith as chairman, but disagreements prevented it from contesting an election. Some participants subsequently established the Forum Party, in which Smith took no leading role. A further attempt at cooperation with Muzorewa and Sithole in 2000 was also unsuccessful.

== Retirement and final years ==
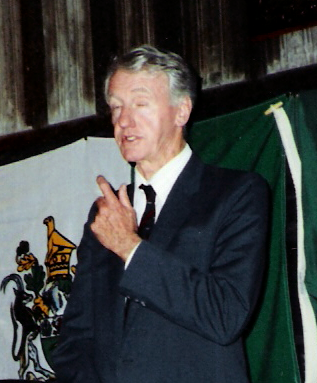
Smith in 1990, speaking at a dinner held in his honour by the Conservative Monday Club in England

Smith continued to live in Harare after retiring from politics. Journalist David Blair described his home as accessible to visitors, while Smith maintained that he had no intention of leaving Zimbabwe. He retained ownership of Gwenoro, employing a manager to operate the farm following his wife Janet's death in 1994.

In 1997, Smith published his autobiography, The Great Betrayal, (Note: The book was republished as Bitter Harvest: The Great Betrayal in 2001.) in which he defended his premiership and criticised Robert Mugabe's government and successive British administrations. He also praised Nelson Mandela, describing him as Africa's "first black statesman". The book attracted considerable interest among white Zimbabweans, with queues forming at a signing in Harare in December 1997. Historian Josephine Fisher noted that some attendees concealed their faces from television cameras, while other white Zimbabweans remained critical of Smith's political record.

=== 2000–2002: renewed public attention ===
Zimbabwe experienced increasing economic difficulties and political unrest around 2000. Historian Martin Meredith attributed the deterioration in living standards partly to government mismanagement and corruption. Mugabe's government introduced a fast-track land reform programme in 2000, under which white-owned commercial farms were occupied and redistributed. The programme was accompanied by violence against farmers and farm workers and contributed to a sharp decline in agricultural production.

In an April 2000 interview, Smith rejected suggestions that he was British rather than African, stating: "I was born here. My children were born here, and my grandchildren were born here. I'm African, not British." The following month, approximately 50 ZANU–PF supporters briefly occupied Gwenoro. Smith downplayed the incident, attributing it to unemployment rather than a political campaign against him.

While addressing the Oxford Union in October 2000, Smith described Mugabe as "mentally deranged". Mugabe subsequently threatened to arrest Smith on genocide charges if he returned to Zimbabwe. Smith challenged the government to proceed with the prosecution, but was not detained when he arrived at Harare airport on 7 November.

In September 2001, ZANU–PF supporters again attempted to occupy Gwenoro. Smith contacted the provincial governor, who arranged for police intervention. The occupiers reportedly left before police arrived.

Smith became involved in another dispute over citizenship in 2002. Amendments to Zimbabwe's citizenship legislation required citizens to renounce claims to foreign nationality. Smith refused to renounce his entitlement to British citizenship, maintaining that he was Zimbabwean by birth. The authorities declined to renew his Zimbabwean passport in March 2002, and state media reported that he had ceased to be a citizen. Smith disputed the decision and described himself as stateless. Home Affairs Minister John Nkomo maintained that Smith could remain in Zimbabwe but would not receive a new passport until he complied with the legislation.

By 2002, Zimbabwe's white population had declined to an estimated 50,000. Smith nevertheless attracted support from some opponents of Mugabe. According to journalist R. W. Johnson, he received a standing ovation after criticising the government during an address at the University of Zimbabwe. His opposition to Mugabe also drew favourable comment from some Zimbabweans who had previously opposed his premiership.

=== Final years and death ===
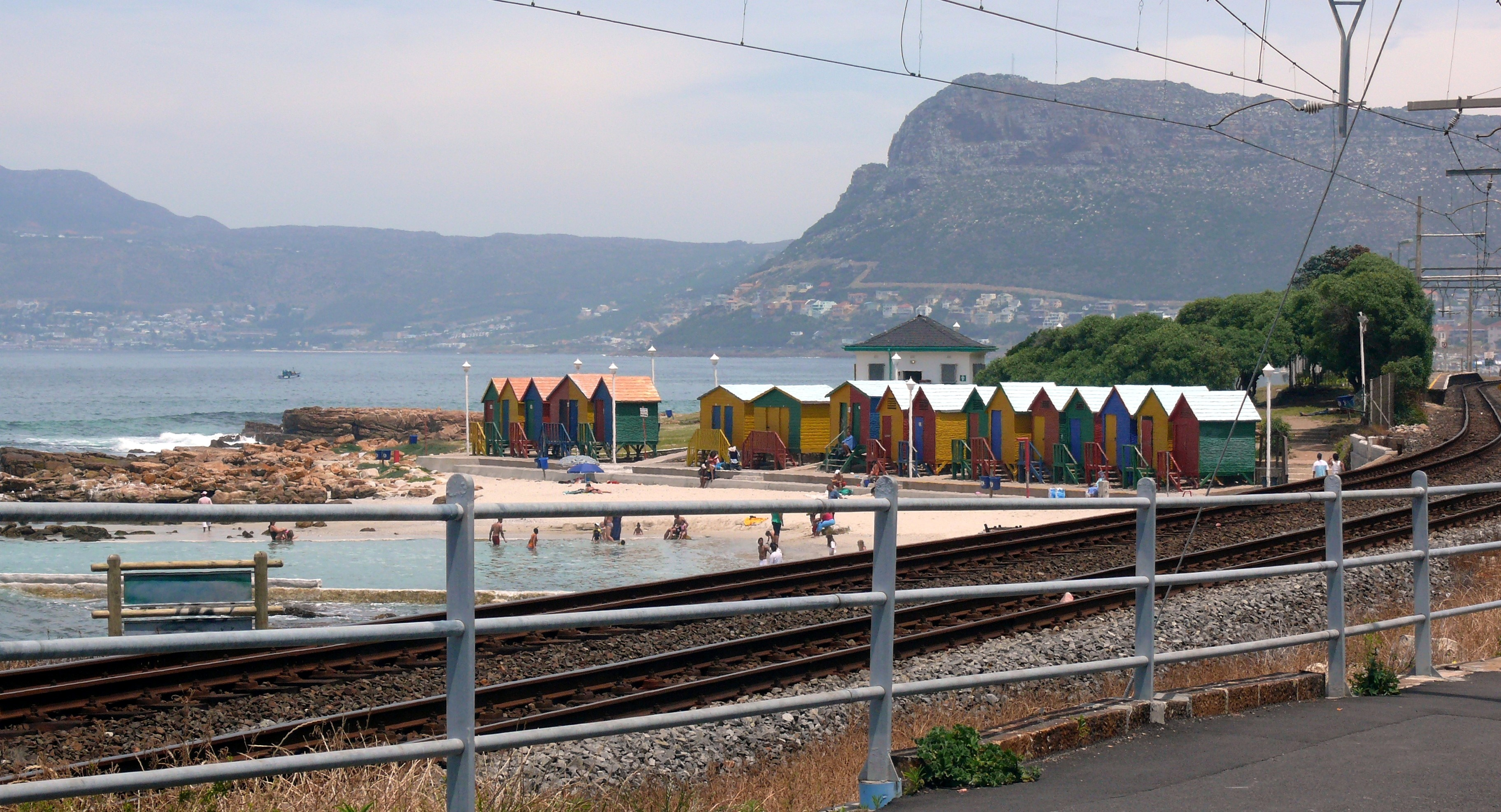
St James, the Cape Town suburb where Smith spent his final years

Smith travelled to South Africa for medical treatment in 2005 and subsequently moved into a retirement home in St James, near Cape Town. His son Alec died of a heart attack at London Heathrow Airport in January 2006. Although Alec had publicly disagreed with his father's political views, the two remained close. Smith's stepdaughter Jean, who had married Rhodesian singer-songwriter Clem Tholet in 1967, and his stepson Robert helped care for him during his final years.

Smith died in Cape Town on 20 November 2007, aged 88, following a stroke. Jean was with him at the time. His ashes were returned to Zimbabwe and scattered at Gwenoro. The farm remained under his stepchildren's ownership until December 2012, when the Zimbabwean government acquired it under its land reform programme and allocated it to a technical college.

Smith's name remained on Zimbabwe's electoral roll after his death. In April 2013, electoral authorities removed his name as part of a wider exercise that struck approximately 345,000 deceased people from the register.

== Character, reputation and legacy ==
As leader of the Rhodesian Front and its successor parties, Smith became closely identified with Rhodesia's white minority. Historian Mordechai Tamarkin described him as a "symbol and father figure" for that community and wrote that, as prime minister, he "personified white Rhodesia". His supporters credited him with defending Rhodesia against communism and maintaining political stability. Critics held him responsible for prolonging white-minority rule, racial inequality and the conflict preceding Zimbabwean independence.

Smith denied that his policies were racially motivated, stating in a 1987 interview that "it was Marxism I fought, not blacks". He expressed no regret for UDI or his premiership, arguing that Zimbabwe's subsequent political and economic difficulties under Robert Mugabe vindicated his warnings about majority rule. Critics disputed this interpretation, citing the consequences of Rhodesia's racial policies, international isolation and war.

Writers have associated Smith's outlook with the imperial values of white Rhodesian settler society. R. W. Johnson described his worldview as "almost Victorian", while historian Bill Schwarz argued that Smith and his supporters regarded themselves as custodians of British imperial traditions abandoned by Britain itself. Smith's service in the Second World War reinforced his identification with Britain. Johnson called the war "undoubtedly the central experience of his life", and Smith regarded Britain's subsequent opposition to UDI as a betrayal of Rhodesia's wartime contribution.

His relations with British politicians were frequently strained. Kenneth Young wrote that Smith appeared to many of them as "a foreigner in all but language", whose political assumptions belonged to an earlier era. Smith maintained that successive British governments had failed to honour their obligations to Rhodesia and had left his administration with no acceptable alternative to UDI.

Smith's refusal to accept majority rule became a defining feature of his reputation, particularly after his televised statement in March 1976 that he did not believe in majority rule in Rhodesia "not in 1,000 years". Peter Godwin later argued that the remark was frequently quoted without its accompanying discussion of black and white political cooperation, although he remained critical of Smith's record.

Contemporaries described Smith as a persistent negotiator whose unwillingness to compromise was variously interpreted as conviction or inflexibility. Colleagues including P. K. van der Byl praised his composure, while journalists noted his restrained speaking style and informal manner. Biographer Phillippa Berlyn attributed part of his popularity among white Rhodesians to his accessibility. Some political opponents also acknowledged his determination while rejecting his policies.

Smith's wartime injuries remained visible throughout his political career. Plastic surgery following his 1943 aircraft crash left the right side of his face partly paralysed, while other injuries caused a stoop, a slight limp and difficulty sitting for extended periods.

His death in 2007 prompted differing reactions. Bright Matonga, Zimbabwe's Deputy Minister of Information, said Smith would not be mourned by many Zimbabweans. Some Zimbabweans interviewed after his death contrasted Rhodesia's relative economic stability with conditions under Mugabe, without necessarily endorsing Smith's racial policies.

Zimbabwean opposition figures also offered differing assessments. Patrick Kombayi praised aspects of the infrastructure and economy inherited from Rhodesia. David Coltart described Smith personally as modest and principled but considered his premiership politically disastrous, arguing that his resistance to majority rule had radicalised African nationalism and contributed to the violence surrounding independence. Godwin similarly argued that the emergency powers employed against African nationalists under Smith established precedents subsequently used by Mugabe's government.

Several commentators observed that Smith's reputation among some Zimbabweans improved as dissatisfaction with Mugabe's government increased. Lord Carrington, who chaired the Lancaster House negotiations, remained highly critical of Smith, describing him in 2005 as a major contributor to Zimbabwe's subsequent difficulties.

== Newspaper and journal articles ==
- Bevan, Stephen (20 November 2007). "Zimbabweans praise 'generous' Ian Smith". The Daily Telegraph. London. Archived from the original on 12 January 2022.
- Blair, David (8 November 2000). "Ian Smith defies Mugabe's threats and flies home". The Daily Telegraph. London. Archived from the original on 12 January 2022.
- Blair, David (28 March 2002). "Ian Smith is stripped of Zimbabwe citizenship". The Daily Telegraph. London. Archived from the original on 12 January 2022.
- Blair, David (20 November 2007). "Ian Smith: Man whose folly unleashed Mugabe". The Daily Telegraph. London. Archived from the original on 12 January 2022.
- Blair, David; Thornycroft, Peta (20 November 2007). "Former Rhodesian PM Ian Smith dies". The Daily Telegraph. London. Archived from the original on 12 January 2022.
- Boynton, Graham (22 November 2007). "Ian Smith has sadly been proved right". The Daily Telegraph. London. Archived from the original on 12 January 2022.
- Chinaka, Cris (20 November 2007). "Former Rhodesian leader Ian Smith dies". Reuters. London. Archived from the original on 7 August 2016.
- Coltart, David (21 November 2007). "Statement on the death of Ian Douglas Smith". davidcoltart.com.
- Cowell, Alan (20 November 2007). "Ian Smith, former Rhodesian leader, dies at 88". The New York Times.
- Cowell, Alan (21 November 2007). "Ian Smith, Defiant Symbol of White Rule in Africa, Is Dead at 88". The New York Times.
- Faul, Michelle (30 November 1985). "Right-Wing Rancher-Politician Shot Dead". New York: Associated Press.
- Fields, Jane (18 April 2013). "Zimbabwe's last white ruler struck off voter roll". The Scotsman. Edinburgh.
- Godwin, Peter (25 November 2007). "If only Ian Smith had shown some imagination, then more of his people might live at peace". The Guardian. London.
- Hall, Lee (27 May 1966). "Rhodesia's Face of Defiance". Life. New York. pp. 22–30.
- Hempstone, Smith (19 February 1986). "The last hurrah of Zimbabwe's Ian Smith". Observer–Reporter. Washington, Pennsylvania. p. A4.
- Johnson, R. W. (25 November 2007). "Lost paradise of the big white chief". The Sunday Times. London. Archived from the original on 12 January 2014.(subscription required)
- Majendie, Paul (26 October 2000). "Arrest me, Smith tells Mugabe". News24. Cape Town. Archived from the original on 12 January 2015.
- McWilliam, Michael (January 2003). "Zimbabwe and the Commonwealth". The Round Table: The Commonwealth Journal of International Affairs. 92 (368). Newtonabbey, Northern Ireland: 89–98. doi:10.1080/750456746. S2CID 144538905.
- Meldrum, Andrew (15 May 2000). "Mugabe supporters invade Ian Smith's farm". The Guardian. London.
- Meldrum, Andrew; MacAskill, Ewen (6 September 2001). "Zimbabwe farm militants try to evict Ian Smith". The Guardian. London.
- Minetree, Harry (7 June 1976). "The Prime Minister of Besieged Rhodesia: 'no Bugger on Earth Can Tell Smithie What to Do'". People. Vol. 5, no. 22. New York.
- Mobley, Richard (Winter 2002). "The Beira patrol: Britain's broken blockade against Rhodesia". Naval War College Review. LV (1). Newport, Rhode Island: 63–84. Archived from the original on 14 September 2014.
- Moorcraft, Paul (1990). "Rhodesia's War of Independence". History Today. 40 (9). London. ISSN 0018-2753.
- Ndlovu, Tendai (13 March 2008). "My Country is Bleeding". The Zimbabwean. London. Archived from the original on 1 June 2015.
- Raath, Jan (23 November 2007). "Life was 'better under Smith'". The Australian. Sydney. Archived from the original on 2 June 2014.
- Ranger, Terence (1997). "Violence Variously Remembered: the Killing of Pieter Oberholzer in July 1964". History in Africa. 24. New Brunswick, New Jersey: 273–286. doi:10.2307/3172030. JSTOR 3172030. S2CID 159673826.
- Sakaike, Tonic (1 July 1985). "Mugabe pledges tougher policy towards whites". The Glasgow Herald. p. 4.
- Schuettler, Darren (14 May 2000). "Ian Smith shakes fist at Robert Mugabe". Independent Online. Cape Town. Archived from the original on 2 October 2015.
- Smith, David (21 January 2011). "Third of Zimbabwe's registered voters are dead". The Guardian. London.
- Smith, David (10 May 2013). "Robert Mugabe's land reform comes under fresh scrutiny". The Guardian. London.
- Thornycroft, Peta (6 December 2012). "Robert Mugabe seizes former Rhodesian PM's family farm". The Daily Telegraph. London. Archived from the original on 12 January 2022.
- Winn, Michael (7 May 1979). "Despite Rhodesia's Elections, Robert Mugabe Vows to Wage Guerrilla War 'to the Last Man'". People. 11 (18). New York. Archived from the original on 11 January 2014.
- Younghusband, Peter (17 March 1978). "The scars show on Ian Smith". The Sydney Morning Herald. p. 7.
- "Rhodesia: Christmas Postponed". Time. New York. 6 November 1964.(subscription required)
- "Ian Smith declares Rhodesia a republic". London: BBC. 2 March 1970.
- "Personality: Flight Lieutenant Ian Smith. The wartime story of the Rhodesian Prime Minister". After the Battle. No. 10. London. 1975. pp. 43–46.
- "1975: Rhodesia peace talks fail". London: BBC. 26 August 1975.
- "The Man who cried Uncle". Time. New York. 11 October 1976. Archived from the original on 24 November 2007.(subscription required)
- "Ian Smith collapses in Zimbabwe Parliament". The Glasgow Herald. 25 June 1982. p. 4.
- "Ian Smith granted a British passport to seek treatment". The Glasgow Herald. 7 April 1983. p. 4.
- "Ian Smith Invites Blacks to Join His Party". The New York Times. 23 July 1984. p. A5.
- "Mugabe Denounces Amnesty Report on Torture". New York: Associated Press. 20 November 1985.
- "Ian Smith branded 'enemy of state'". The Glasgow Herald. 21 February 1987. p. 4.
- "Ian Smith Still Stubborn, Forceful". Star-Banner. Ocala, Florida. 9 August 1987. p. 2F.
- "The Reverend Ndabaningi Sithole". The Daily Telegraph. London. 14 December 2000. Archived from the original on 12 January 2022.
- "Smith Fails to Renounce British Citizenship". The Herald. Harare. 28 March 2002.
- "Citizenship Pulled, Ex-Premier Says". Los Angeles Times. 28 March 2002.
- "Alec Smith – Unlikely reconciler in Zimbabwe". The Independent. London. 2 February 2006. Archived from the original on 13 October 2010.
- "Ex-Rhodesia leader Ian Smith dies". London: BBC. 21 November 2007.
- "Ian Smith". The Daily Telegraph. London. 21 November 2007. Archived from the original on 12 January 2022.
- "Robert Mugabe says 'only God' can remove him". The Daily Telegraph. London. 20 June 2008. Archived from the original on 12 January 2022.
- "Ian Smith". The Times. London. 21 November 2007. Archived from the original on 29 August 2008.(subscription required)
- "Mixed reactions in Zimbabwe over Ian Smith's death". The Week. London. 21 November 2007. Archived from the original on 11 January 2014.
- "Mugabe 'resigns'". London: BBC. 21 November 2017.

Online sources

- Wood, J.R.T. (1999). "Four Tall NCOs of the Life Guards: Lord Mountbatten, Harold Wilson, and the Immediate Aftermath of UDI: The Proposed Mountbatten Mission". jrtwood.com. Durban.
- "Colonial administrators and post-independence leaders in Zimbabwe (1923–2000)". Oxford Dictionary of National Biography. Oxford: Oxford University Press.
- "Resolution 448 (1979) Adopted by the Security Council at its 2143rd meeting". New York: UN Security Council. 30 April 1979. UN Document S/RES/448 (1979).

Bibliography

- Baxter, T. W.; Burke, E. E. (1970). Guide to the Historical Manuscripts in the National Archives of Rhodesia (First ed.). Salisbury: National Archives of Rhodesia. ASIN B0017HAKHI.
- Berlyn, Phillippa (1978). The Quiet Man: A Biography of the Hon. Ian Douglas Smith. Salisbury: M.O. Collins. OCLC 4282978.
  - Rowland, J Reid. "Constitutional History of Rhodesia: An outline". In Berlyn (1978), pp. 240–256.
- Binda, Alexandre (November 2007). Heppenstall, David (ed.). Masodja: The History of the Rhodesian African Rifles and its forerunner the Rhodesian Native Regiment. Johannesburg: 30° South Publishers. ISBN 978-1-920143-03-9.
- Binda, Alexandre (May 2008). The Saints: The Rhodesian Light Infantry. Johannesburg: 30° South Publishers. ISBN 978-1-920143-07-7.
- Blake, Robert (1977). A History of Rhodesia (First ed.). London: Eyre Methuen. ISBN 978-0-413-28350-4.
- Bolze, Louis; Ravn, Klaus (1966). Life With UDI. Salisbury: Mardon Printers. OCLC 9116649.
- Brownell, Josiah (2011). The Collapse of Rhodesia: Population Demographics and the Politics of Race. New York: I.B. Tauris. ISBN 978-1-84885-475-8.
- Caute, David (June 1983). Under the Skin: The Death of White Rhodesia (First ed.). Evanston, Illinois: Northwestern University Press. ISBN 978-0-8101-0658-1.
- Chikuhwa, Jacob (March 2004). A Crisis of Governance: Zimbabwe (First ed.). New York: Algora Publishing. ISBN 978-0-87586-286-6.
- Cilliers, Jakkie (December 1984). Counter-Insurgency in Rhodesia. London, Sydney & Dover, New Hampshire: Croom Helm. ISBN 978-0-7099-3412-7.
- Cowderoy, Dudley; Nesbit, James (1987). War in the Air: Rhodesian Air Force 1935–1980. Johannesburg: Galago. ISBN 978-0-947020-13-2.
- Daume, Daphne, ed. (1980). Britannica Book of the Year. Chicago, Illinois: Encyclopædia Britannica, Inc. ISBN 978-0-85229-372-0.
- DeRoche, Andrew (2003). Andrew Young: Civil Rights Ambassador. Lanham, Maryland: Rowman & Littlefield. ISBN 978-0-8420-2957-5.
- Falkender, Marcia (October 1972). Inside Number 10. London: Weidenfeld & Nicolson. ISBN 978-0-297-99511-1.
- Fedorowich, Kent; Thomas, Martin, eds. (2001). International Diplomacy and Colonial Retreat. London: Frank Cass. ISBN 978-0-7146-5063-0.
- Fisher, J.L. (2010). Pioneers, settlers, aliens, exiles: the decolonisation of white identity in Zimbabwe. Canberra: ANU E Press. ISBN 978-1-921666-14-8.
- Fontein, Joost (September 2006). The Silence of Great Zimbabwe: Contested Landscapes and the Power of Heritage (First ed.). London: University College London Press. ISBN 978-1-84472-123-8.
- Godwin, Peter; Hancock, Ian (1995). Rhodesians Never Die: The Impact of War and Political Change on White Rhodesia, 1970–1980. Harare: Baobab Books. ISBN 978-0-908311-82-8.
- Gowlland-Debbas, Vera (1990). Collective Responses to Illegal Acts in International Law: United Nations action in the question of Southern Rhodesia (First ed.). Leiden and New York: Martinus Nijhoff Publishers. ISBN 978-0-7923-0811-9.
- Hill, Geoff (2005) [2003]. The Battle for Zimbabwe: The Final Countdown. Johannesburg: Struik Publishers. ISBN 978-1-86872-652-3.
- Holland, Heidi (February 2009). Dinner with Mugabe: The Untold Story of a Freedom Fighter Who Became a Tyrant. London: Penguin Books. ISBN 978-0-14-104079-0.
- Jackson, Robert H. (1990). Quasi-States: Sovereignty, International Relations and the Third World. Cambridge, England: Cambridge University Press. ISBN 978-0-521-44783-6.
- Kalley, Jacqueline; Schoeman, Elna; Andor, L E (February 1999). Southern African Political History: A Chronology of Key Political Events from Independence to Mid-1997 (First ed.). Westport, Connecticut: Greenwood Publishing Group. ISBN 978-0-313-30247-3.
- Kriger, Norma (2003). Guerrilla Veterans in Post-war Zimbabwe: Symbolic and Violent Politics, 1980–1987. Cambridge: Cambridge University Press. ISBN 978-0-521-81823-0.
- Loney, Martin (1975). Rhodesia: White Racism and Imperial Response. Penguin African Library (First ed.). London: Penguin Books. ISBN 978-0-14-041041-9.
- Martin, David; Johnson, Phyllis (July 1981). The Struggle for Zimbabwe (First ed.). London: Faber and Faber. ISBN 978-0-571-11066-7.
- Meredith, Martin (September 2007) [2002]. Mugabe: Power, Plunder and the Struggle for Zimbabwe. New York: PublicAffairs. ISBN 978-1-58648-558-0.
- Moorcraft, Paul L.; McLaughlin, Peter (April 2008) [1982]. The Rhodesian War: A Military History. Barnsley: Pen and Sword Books. ISBN 978-1-84415-694-8.
- Moore, Charles (2013). Margaret Thatcher: The Authorized Biography. Volume One: Not for Turning (First ed.). London: Allen Lane. ISBN 978-0-7139-9282-3.
- Mungazi, Dickson A. (February 2000). In the Footsteps of the Masters: Desmond M Tutu and Abel T Muzorewa. Westport, Connecticut: Praeger Publishers. ISBN 978-0-275-96680-5.
- Ndlovu-Gatsheni, Sabelo J. (2009). Do 'Zimbabweans' Exist? Trajectories of Nationalism, National Identity Formation and Crisis in a Postcolonial State (First ed.). Bern: Peter Lang AG. ISBN 978-3-03911-941-7.
- Nelson, Harold D., ed. (1983). Zimbabwe, a Country Study. Area Handbook Series (Second ed.). Washington, D.C.: Department of the Army, American University. OCLC 227599708.
- Nkiwane, Tankeda C. "Opposition Politics in Zimbabwe: The Struggle within the Struggle". in Olukoshi, Adebayo O., ed. (February 1998). The Politics of Opposition in Contemporary Africa. Uppsala: Nordic Africa Institute. pp. 91–112. ISBN 978-91-7106-419-6.
- Olson, James Stuart; Shadle, Robert, eds. (1996). Historical Dictionary of the British Empire: K–Z. Westport, Connecticut: Greenwood Publishing Group. ISBN 978-0-313-27917-1.
- Palley, Claire (1966). The Constitutional History and Law of Southern Rhodesia 1888–1965, with Special Reference to Imperial Control (First ed.). Oxford: Clarendon Press. OCLC 406157.
- Rowe, David M. (2001). Manipulating the Market: Understanding Economic Sanctions, Institutional Change, and the Political Unity of White Rhodesia (First ed.). Ann Arbor, Michigan: University of Michigan Press. ISBN 978-0-472-11187-9.
- Schwarz, Bill (2011). The White Man's World (First ed.). Oxford: Oxford University Press. ISBN 978-0-19-929691-0.
- Smith, Ian (June 1997). The Great Betrayal: The Memoirs of Ian Douglas Smith. London: John Blake Publishing. ISBN 978-1-85782-176-5.
- Smith, Ian (February 2001). Bitter Harvest: The Great Betrayal. London: John Blake Publishing. ISBN 978-1-903402-05-4.
- Smith, Whitney, ed. (1976). The Flag Bulletin. Volumes 15–17. Winchester, Massachusetts: Flag Research Center.
- Strack, Harry R. (May 1978). Sanctions: The Case of Rhodesia (First ed.). Syracuse, New York: Syracuse University Press. ISBN 978-0-8156-2161-4.
- Tamarkin, Mordechai (April 1990). The Making of Zimbabwe: Decolonization in Regional and International Politics. London: Frank Cass. ISBN 978-0-7146-3355-8.
- Van Rensburg, A. P. J. (1975). Contemporary Leaders of Africa. Cape Town: HAUM. ISBN 978-0-7986-0156-6. OCLC 1676807.
- Wessels, Hannes (July 2010). PK van der Byl: African Statesman. Johannesburg: 30° South Publishers. ISBN 978-1-920143-49-7.
- White, Matthew C. (1978). Smith of Rhodesia: A Pictorial Biography. Cape Town: Don Nelson. ISBN 978-0-909238-36-0.
- Williams, Gwyneth; Hackland, Brian (July 1988). The Dictionary of Contemporary Politics of Southern Africa (First ed.). London: Routledge. ISBN 978-0-415-00245-5.
- Willson, F.M.G., ed. (1963). Source Book of Parliamentary Elections and Referenda in Southern Rhodesia, 1898–1962. Salisbury: Department of Government, University College of Rhodesia and Nyasaland. OCLC 219295658.
- Wilson, Harold (1974) [1971]. The Labour Government, 1964–70: A Personal Record. London: Penguin Books. ISBN 978-0-14-021762-9.
- Windrich, Elaine (1978). Britain and the Politics of Rhodesian Independence. London: Croom Helm. ISBN 978-0-85664-709-3.
- Wood, J.R.T. (June 2005). So Far and No Further! Rhodesia's Bid For Independence During the Retreat From Empire 1959–1965. Victoria, British Columbia: Trafford Publishing. ISBN 978-1-4120-4952-8.
- Wood, J.R.T. (April 2008). A Matter of Weeks Rather Than Months: The Impasse Between Harold Wilson and Ian Smith: Sanctions, Aborted Settlements and War 1965–1969. Victoria, British Columbia: Trafford Publishing. ISBN 978-1-4251-4807-2.
- Young, Kenneth (1969) [1967]. Rhodesia and Independence: A Study in British Colonial Policy. London: J M Dent & Sons. OCLC 955160.
- SouthScan. Volume 7. London: SouthScan. 1992. OCLC 955160.
- Petter-Bowyer, Peter J. H. (2005). Winds of Destruction: The Autobiography of a Rhodesian Combat Pilot. Johannesburg: 30 Degrees South Publishers. ISBN 978-0-9548490-3-0.
- White, Luise (2021). Fighting and Writing: The Rhodesian Army at War and Postwar. Durham, North Carolina: Duke University Press. ISBN 978-1-4780-1172-9.

Southern Rhodesian Legislative Assembly
Preceded by George Baden-Powell Tunmer	Member of Parliament for Selukwe; 1948 – 1953	Succeeded by George Baden-Powell Tunmer
Rhodesia and Nyasaland Federal Assembly
New title	Member of Federal Parliament for Midlands; 1953 – 1958	Succeeded by
New title	Member of Federal Parliament for Gwanda; 1958 – 1962	Succeeded by
Southern Rhodesian Legislative Assembly
New title	Member of Parliament for Umzingwane; 1962 – 1970	Parliament dissolved
House of Assembly of Rhodesia
New title	Member of Parliament for Umzingwane; 1970 – 1979	Parliament dissolved
Political offices
New title	Deputy Prime Minister of Southern Rhodesia; 1962 – 1964	Succeeded by Clifford Dupont
Preceded by Geoffrey Ellman Brown	Minister of the Treasury; 1962 – 1964	Succeeded by John Wrathall as Minister of Finance
New title	Minister of Posts; 1963 – 1964	Succeeded by John Wrathall
Preceded by Winston Field	Prime Minister of Southern Rhodesia; 1964 – 1965	Succeeded by Himself as Prime Minister of Rhodesia
Preceded by Winston Field	Minister of External Affairs and Defence; 1964	Succeeded by Clifford Dupont
Preceded by Himself as Prime Minister of Southern Rhodesia	Prime Minister of Rhodesia; 1965 – 1979	Succeeded by Abel Muzorewa as Prime Minister of Zimbabwe Rhodesia
Preceded by Clifford Dupont	Minister of Foreign Affairs and Defence; 1965 – 1966	Succeeded by The Duke of Montrose
Parliament of Zimbabwe Rhodesia
New title	Member of Parliament for Southern Constituency; 1979	Parliament dissolved
Political offices
New title	Minister without Portfolio; 1979	Zimbabwe Rhodesia dissolved
Parliament of Zimbabwe
New title	Member of Parliament for Southern Constituency; 1980 – 1985	Succeeded by David Clive Mitchell
Preceded by Patrick Francis Shields	Member of Parliament for Bulawayo Central; 1985 – 1987	White roll abolished
Political offices
New title	Leader of the Opposition of Zimbabwe; 1980 – 1987	Succeeded by Joshua Nkomo
