= Alec Smith =

Zimbabwe National Army chaplain

- Smith in 2002
- Born: Alexander Douglas Smith; 25 May 1949; Gwelo, Southern Rhodesia
- Died: 19 January 2006 (aged 56); London, England
- Occupation: Chaplain
- Spouse: Elisabeth Knudsen (m. 1979)
- Children: 3
- Parents: Ian Smith; Janet Watt

Alexander Douglas "Alec" Smith (25 May 1949 – 19 January 2006) was a Zimbabwe National Army chaplain and son of Rhodesian Prime Minister Ian Smith.

== Early life and education ==
Smith grew up on the 21,500-acre (87 km^{2}) family farm in Selukwe (now Shurugwi), a small mining and farming town with a population in the 1950s of around 8,500 (8,000 black and 500 white).

His father, Ian Smith, had married Janet Watt in late 1948, after returning from war service with a facial disfigurement resulting from crashing his Hurricane whilst taking off from an airfield in Egypt. Watt was a South African school teacher who had previously been married to Piet Duvenage, a South African who had died as the result of a sporting accident while playing rugby. At the time that Watt met Smith, she was struggling to support herself and two young children on a modest teacher's salary. Ian Smith brought up Watt's two children, Robert and Jean, from her earlier marriage, as his own, with his son Alec.

In April 1964, one month before his 15th birthday, Smith's father became Prime Minister of Southern Rhodesia. The younger Smith later suggested that this had caused his family life to suffer. He attended Chaplin High School, and in 1970, Smith began studying law at Rhodes University in South Africa.

He was expelled from the university at the end of his first year in 1971. Whilst returning from a subsequent holiday in Portuguese-ruled Mozambique, Smith was found to be in possession of 200 grams (7 oz) of cannabis at the Tete/Nyamapanda border post between Mozambique and Rhodesia and taken to Salisbury Central Police Station. He was convicted of drug trafficking, fined and given a suspended prison sentence.

Returning to Rhodesia, Smith held a number of odd jobs. He also served without distinction as a conscript in the Rhodesian Security Forces.

In 1972, Smith declared himself a born-again Christian, stating that God had freed him from his past debauchery and helped him to see the injustice of racial discrimination. He aligned himself with the Moral Rearmament group, held public meetings promoting majority rule, and became a close friend of the Reverend Arthur Kanodereka, a black-nationalist leader who was assassinated at the end of 1978.

== Life abroad ==
By 1976, the Rhodesian Bush War was escalating and many white soldiers were recalled to active duty.

Smith met Elisabeth Knudsen, a Norwegian staff member of Moral Rearmament, at the organization's conference centre in Caux, Switzerland. The couple married in Oslo in June 1979, but the Norwegian government denied his parents entry to attend the ceremony. Ian Smith later discussed his bitterness over the refusal of the international community to recognise Rhodesia, and described the Norway incident as "the final straw".

== Life in Zimbabwe ==
After their wedding in Oslo, the couple returned to Zimbabwe later in 1979, and went on to have three children.

During the 1980s and early 1990s, Smith held a number of jobs, including, from 1991 to 1996, managing director of a professional football team, the Black Aces. Although not an ordained priest, he became a reserve chaplain in the new Zimbabwe National Army.

Smith later worked with his father on the farm close to Shurugwi In 1984, he wrote a semi-autobiographical account of the struggle for majority rule in Rhodesia titled Now I Call Him Brother. The book was ghost-written for Alec by the professional writer Rebecca de Saintonge.

== Political involvement ==
During the period 1975 to 1979, Rhodesia descended into an increasingly violent civil war between the white minority government and the two black-nationalist armies, the Zimbabwe African National Liberation Army (ZANLA) and Zimbabwe People's Revolutionary Army (ZIPRA).

The Christian Moral Rearmament (MRA) group, of which Smith was a prominent member, was involved in trying to bring the conflict to an end. The black-nationalist party ZANU-PF won the 1980 election, but elements in the white ruling class were plotting a military coup (Operation Quartz) to prevent it from taking control of the government.

In an attempt to prevent a renewal of the war, MRA members brokered a face-to-face meeting between Robert Mugabe (leader of ZANU-PF) and Ian Smith. MRA member Joram Kucherera (a senior civil servant) used contacts inside ZANU-PF to approach Mugabe, while Alec Smith approached his father. Ian Smith went to Robert Mugabe's house on the night of 3/4 March 1980, accompanied only by Kucherera. The meeting lasted several hours, was reportedly cordial, and settled the discussion; Ian Smith accepted the verdict of the election while Mugabe agreed to continued white participation in the government and administration.

Alec Smith took no further role in politics, although he remained active in community issues through the development of sport. It is believed that he declined an invitation to participate in the Movement for Democratic Change in the late 1990s.

== Death ==
In January 2006, Smith travelled from Tel Aviv, where his wife was working for the Norwegian Embassy, to Harare. Whilst in the transit lounge at Heathrow Airport, Smith suddenly suffered a fatal heart attack, having previously been in good health. His body was cremated in London and returned to Norway for a memorial service in the church where he had been married. He was buried at a local graveyard in Oslo, and a memorial service was also held at the Anglican cathedral in Harare.

Alec Smith was described by Rebecca de Saintonge, the ghost-writer of his memoir, as "...a pale, slow-walking, slow-talking man with watery eyes and a gentle sense of humour. There was nothing overtly animated about him. He was a will-o'-the-wisp: you never knew quite where he'd come from or where he was going."
