= Janet Smith (Rhodesia) =

Teacher, wife of Ian Smith, PM of Rhodesia

Janet Smith CLM

Spouse of the Prime Minister of Rhodesia
- In role 13 April 1964 – 1 June 1979
- Prime Minister: Ian Smith
- Preceded by: Barbara Field
- Succeeded by: Maggie Muzorewa

Personal details
- Born: Janet Watt; 1915 Cape Town, Cape Province, South Africa
- Died: 3 December 1994 (aged 79) Harare, Zimbabwe
- Resting place: Shurugwi, Zimbabwe
- Spouse(s): Piet Duvenage (m. 1942; died 1947) Ian Smith (m. 1948)
- Relations: Owen Horwood (brother-in-law); Clem Tholet (son-in-law)
- Children: Robert; Jean; Alec
- Education: University of Cape Town (BA)
- Occupation: Teacher; farmer
- Awards: Legion of Merit CLM

Janet Duvenage Smith CLM (née Watt; 1915 – 3 December 1994) was the wife of Ian Smith, Prime Minister of Rhodesia from 1964 to 1979. Born in Cape Town, South Africa, she studied history at the University of Cape Town and became a teacher. In 1942, she married Piet Duvenage, a rugby player, and had two children. He died in an accident on the rugby field in 1947. The next year, a short visit with family in Southern Rhodesia became permanent when she accepted a teaching job in Selukwe. There, she met her future husband, Ian Smith, who had recently come home from the Second World War. In 1948, the couple got married and bought a farm, and Ian was elected to the Southern Rhodesian Legislative Assembly.

In 1964, when Ian Smith became Prime Minister of Rhodesia, the family moved to the premier's residence in Salisbury. Smith split her time between state functions and managing the farm back in Selukwe. After Zimbabwean independence from the United Kingdom, her husband was defeated at the 1980 election, but remained in the Parliament of Zimbabwe until 1987. Smith continued to divide her time between Harare and the farm until her death from cancer in 1994.

== Early life, education, and first marriage ==
Janet Watt was born in Cape Town in the Union of South Africa in 1915. Her parents were from Scotland, and her father was a surgeon. She attended the University of Cape Town, where she studied history, geology, and some philosophy, and was a star field hockey player. She was quite well known for playing hockey for Western Province. There, she briefly met her future husband, Ian Smith, who was on campus as a member of the visiting Rhodes University rugby team.

After graduating, Watt earned her teaching qualification and became a history teacher. In 1942, she married Piet Duvenage, a physician and rugby player. Together they had a son, Robert, and a daughter, Jean. Piet Duvenage died in a freak accident on the field during a club rugby practice in May 1947. A young widow, she was left to support her two young children on a teacher's salary.

== Move to Southern Rhodesia and Ian Smith ==
In 1947, Duvenage took her two children to Selukwe, Southern Rhodesia, to stay with family for a short holiday. The move became permanent when she accepted a job offer from Selukwe Primary School. That year, through her sister, she became reacquainted with Ian Smith, who had recently returned to his hometown and was taking courses at Gwebi College of Agriculture. He later wrote that the qualities that had attracted him most to Janet were her intelligence, courage and "oppos[ition] on principle to side-stepping or evading an issue ... her tendency was to opt for a decision requiring courage, as opposed to taking the easy way out." In 1948, she and Smith became engaged, and she started a new position as the mathematics and geography mistress at Chaplin High School in nearby Gwelo.

== Farming and politics ==
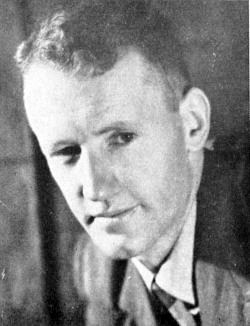
Ian Smith, circa 1954

In July 1948, a general election was called in Southern Rhodesia after the United Party government, headed by the Prime Minister, Sir Godfrey Huggins, unexpectedly lost a vote in the Legislative Assembly. In August, about a month before election day, Ian Smith was approached by members of the opposition Liberal Party who asked him to run for election in Selukwe. Jacob Smit's Liberals, despite their name, were decidedly illiberal, chiefly representing commercial farming, mining and industrial interests. Smith was initially reluctant, saying he was too busy organising his life to stand, but agreed after one of the Liberal officials suggested that a political career might allow him to defend the values he had fought for in the Second World War. With their wedding barely a fortnight away, Smith was astonished to learn of her husband's decision to run for the Southern Rhodesian Legislative Assembly, having never before heard him discuss politics. She asked him, "Are you interested in politics—party politics?" He replied, "I can't say that I am really interested in party politics, but I've always been most interested in sound government."

In addition to becoming a politician, August 1948 was important for the Smiths in two other ways: it was the month they got married, and the month they purchased their first farm. The 3,600-acre (15 km^{2}) farm was a plot of rough land near Selukwe, bounded by the Lundi and Impali Rivers and bisected by a clear stream. They called it "Gwenoro", using the name that the local Karanga people used to refer to the stream, (Note: Previously part of the vast Aberfoyle estate, the property was officially called "Remainder of Subdivision 4 of Aberfoyle Ranch" when Smith bought it from the Bechuanaland Exploration Company, which had owned it since the late-nineteenth century. "Gwenoro" means "Place of the Kudu" (gwe meaning "the place" and noro kudu).) and set up a ranch where they ran cattle and grew tobacco and maize. Ian adopted her children, taking up the responsibilities of instant fatherhood, partially, as he explained, "because I knew [Piet Duvenage] so well" from playing rugby against him. After the wedding, and a few days' honeymoon in Victoria Falls, the Smiths returned home and went straight into the election campaign. On election on 15 September, Ian Smith won with 361 votes, a substantial 100+ vote majority over the second place Labour candidate. At 28 years old, he became the youngest MP in Southern Rhodesian history.

Having grown up in an area of Cape Town so pro-Smuts that she had never had to vote, Smith did not think her husband's entry to parliament would alter their lives at all. "First of all I was marrying a farmer," she later said, "now he was going to be a politician as well. So I said, 'Well, if you are really interested in it, carry on.'... It never dawned on me—being so naive about politicians—that our lives would be affected in the slightest degree." However, it soon became evident that her husband's political office necessitated that he spend a lot of time away from Selukwe working in Salisbury, meaning she would have to run the farm during his absences. On 20 May 1949, their only son, Alec, was born in Gwelo.

== Wife of the Prime Minister ==
Ian Smith defected from the Liberal Party to the United Federal Party, and served as Chief Whip from 1958 onwards. He left in 1961 in protest at the territory's new constitution, and the following year helped Winston Field to form the all-white, firmly conservative Rhodesian Front (RF), which called for independence without an immediate shift to black majority rule. Her husband's right-wing views were no problem for Smith, whose views on race were even more hardline than his. Ian became Deputy Prime Minister following the Rhodesian Front's December 1962 election victory, and stepped up to the premiership after Field resigned in April 1964. The Smiths left management of the farm to others, and relocated to Salisbury to move into the Prime Minister's official residence, later known as Independence.

On 11 November 1965, in the wake of a number of failed negotiations with Britain, Ian Smith and his Cabinet unilaterally declared independence as Rhodesia. Smith would hold the premiership for about the next decade and a half. As the Prime Minister's wife, Smith spent much of her time involved with matters of state, so much so that her son Alec described her as "a trace of perfume on the air" to him in those days. Free from parental supervision, the teenaged Alec became a frequent partier and consumer of alcohol and drugs. Meanwhile, both Janet and Ian enjoyed his time in the premiership. Janet, a charming, intelligent, and determined woman, adapted well to her role as the Prime Minister's wife. A common, if unfounded, smear used against Ian by his domestic political opponents was that his wife was "the power behind the throne."

In the face of United Nations economic sanctions, and with the support of apartheid South Africa, and, until 1974, Portugal, Rhodesia's government endured. Several bouts of talks with the UK came to nothing, and Ian Smith and the Rhodesian Front remained in power through several more decisive electoral victories. The Rhodesian Bush War ramped up beginning in 1972, with African nationalists fighting a white government that was increasingly under siege and isolated.

== Later life and death ==
In 1978, Ian Smith and non-militant nationalists including Abel Muzorewa signed the Internal Settlement, under which he stepped down from the premiership and the country became Zimbabwe Rhodesia effective 1 June 1979. Following the Lancaster House Agreement, Robert Mugabe and other militant nationalists came to power in an independent Zimbabwe in 1980. Though no longer premier, Ian remained Leader of the Opposition and held a seat in the Parliament of Zimbabwe until 1987. The couple still maintained a residence in Harare (the new name for Salisbury), and Smith continued managing Gwenoro Farm while her husband focused on politics.

She died of cancer in Harare on the night of 3 December 1994. She was buried in her long-time hometown, Shurugwi (previously Selukwe). After her death, her husband employed a manager to run their farm.

== Personal life and family ==
Smith had two children with her first husband, Jean and Robert. In 1967, Jean married Clem Tholet, a singer-songwriter best known for his Rhodesian patriotic songs like "Rhodesians Never Die". Janet and Ian Smith had one son, Alec, who later became chaplain of the Zimbabwe National Army. All three of their children attended Chaplin High School in Gweru. Smith's sister Helen was married to Owen Horwood, who was Minister of Finance in the South African government.

Smith, like her husband, was a church-going Presbyterian, socially conservative, and an avid sportsperson.
