= Umzingwane =

- Village
- Location within Zimbabwe
- Coordinates: 21.0666°S 29.3666°E
- Country: Zimbabwe
- Province: Matabeleland South
- Time zone: UTC+1 (CET)
  - Summer (DST): UTC+1 (CEST)

Umzingwane is a village and the seat of Umzingwane District, Matabeleland South Province, Zimbabwe.

It has one of the most important railway stations in the nation, connecting the Beira–Bulawayo railway and the Beitbridge-Bulawayo railway.
