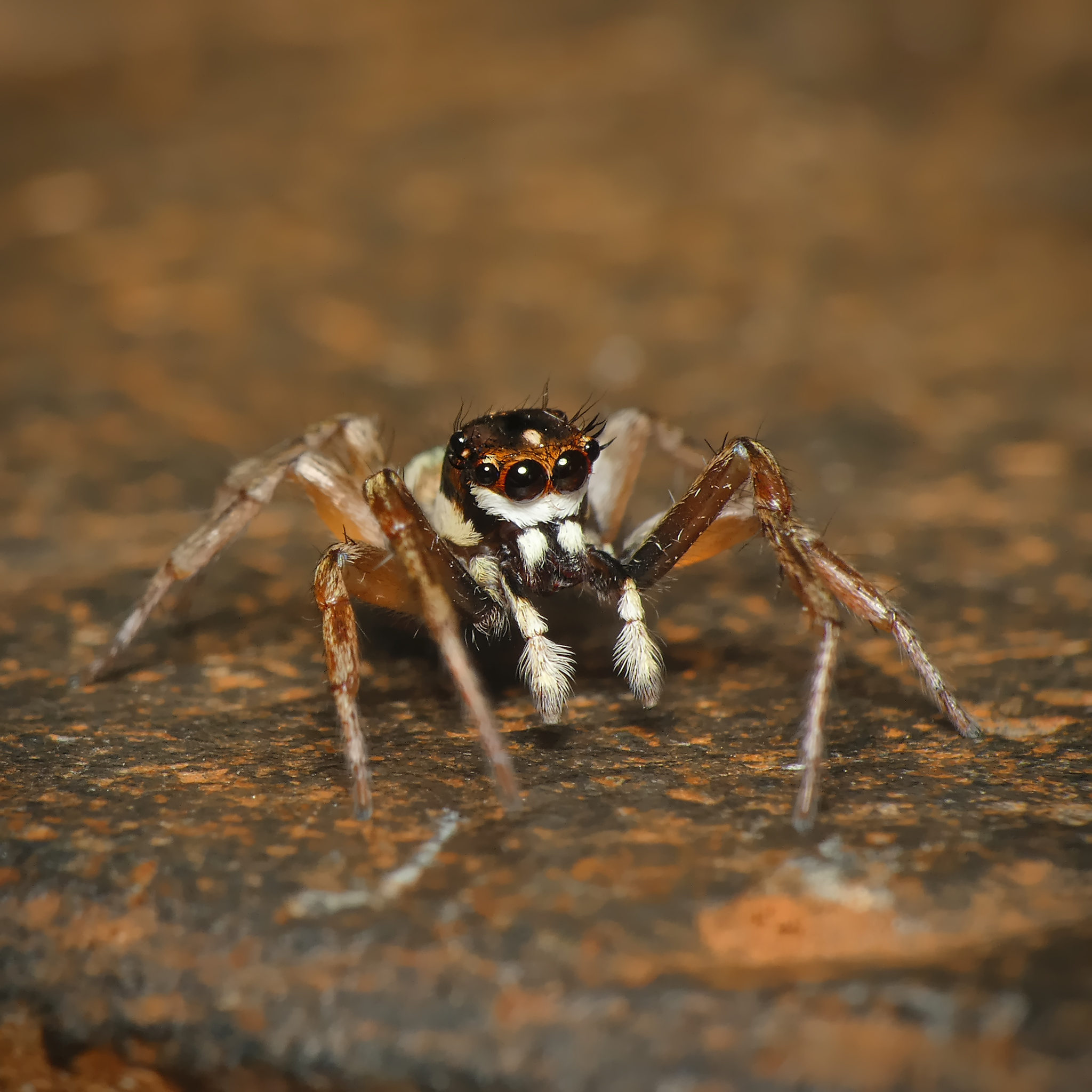
- A specimen from Harare, Zimbabwe

Conservation status
- Least Concern (IUCN 3.1)

Scientific classification
- Kingdom: Animalia
- Phylum: Arthropoda
- Subphylum: Chelicerata
- Class: Arachnida
- Order: Araneae
- Infraorder: Araneomorphae
- Family: Salticidae
- Genus: Parajotus
- Species: P. refulgens

Binomial name
- Parajotus refulgens Wesołowska, 2000

= Parajotus refulgens =

Species of jumping spider

Parajotus refulgens is a species of jumping spider that lives in Africa. A member of the genus Parajotus, the species was first described based on a holotype from Zimbabwe and paratypes from Democratic Republic of Congo, but has been also seen in Botswana, Ivory Coast and Nigeria, and is likely to be more widespread across the continent. The spider has a dark brown round forward section or cephalothorax that is between 1.6 and 2.1 mm (0.06 and 0.08 in) long and, behind that, a greyish or reddish-brown more ovoid abdomen that is between 1.5 and 2.7 mm (0.06 and 0.11 in) long, the female being smaller than the male. This distinctive coloration help distinguish the species from its relatives. The male also has characteristic long black scale-like hairs near the rearmost set of its large central eyes. The male has long light brown or yellow legs, the female's being yellowish-white with dark grey and greyish sections.

== Taxonomy and etymology ==
Parajotus refulgens is a species of jumping spider, a member of the family Salticidae, that was first described by the arachnologist Wanda Wesołowska in 2000. It was one of over 500 species described by Wesołowska during her career, making her one of the most prolific in the field. The holotype is stored at the Natural History Museum of Zimbabwe in Bulawayo. It has a name derived from the Latin word refulgens, which can be translated as 'dazzling'.

Wesołowska allocated the spider to the genus Parajotus, first circumscribed in 1903 by George and Elizabeth Peckham. The genus only contains a few species. Spiders in the genus resemble those in the genus Jotus. In 2015, Wayne Maddison listed the genus in the subtribe Plexippina, which is part of the tribe Plexippini. He considered this provisional as it is based on the shape of the spider's body and the presence of tufts near its eyes. He allocated the tribe to the subclade Simonida in the clade Saltafresia in the clade Salticoida. In 2017, Jerzy Prószyński allocated the genus to a group of genera that he called Hyllines.

== Description ==
Parajotus refulgens found in South Africa and Zimbabwe
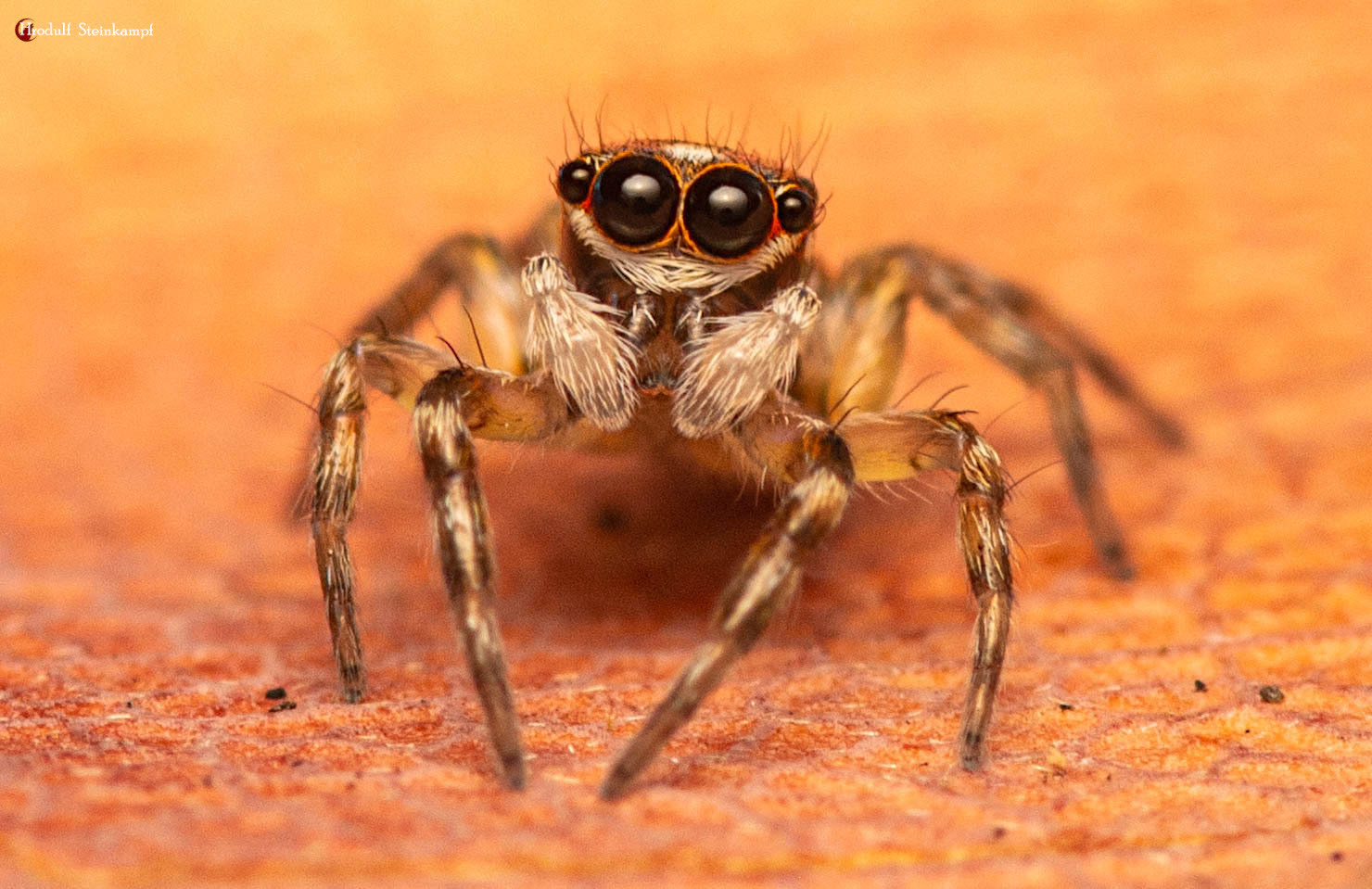

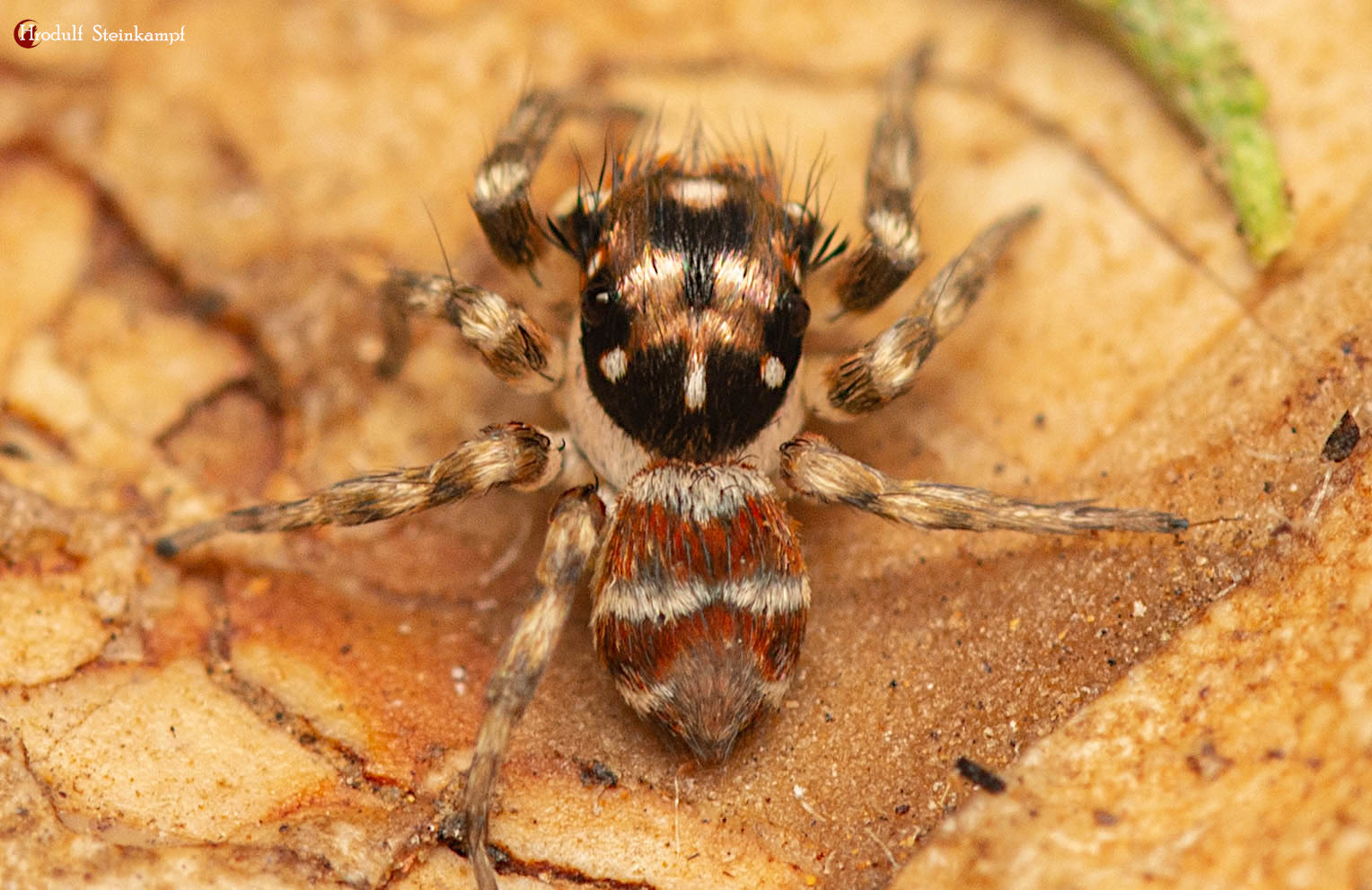

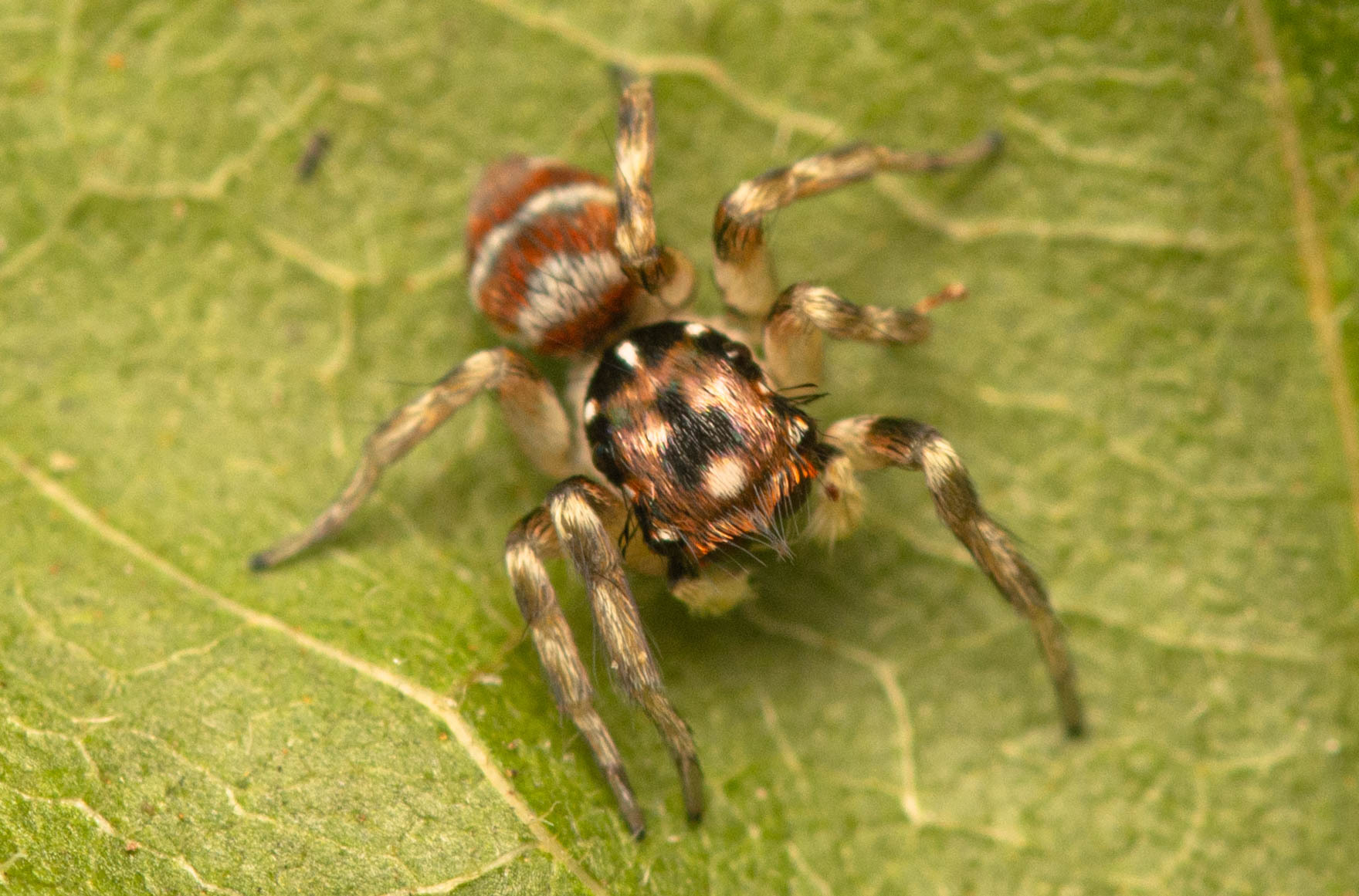

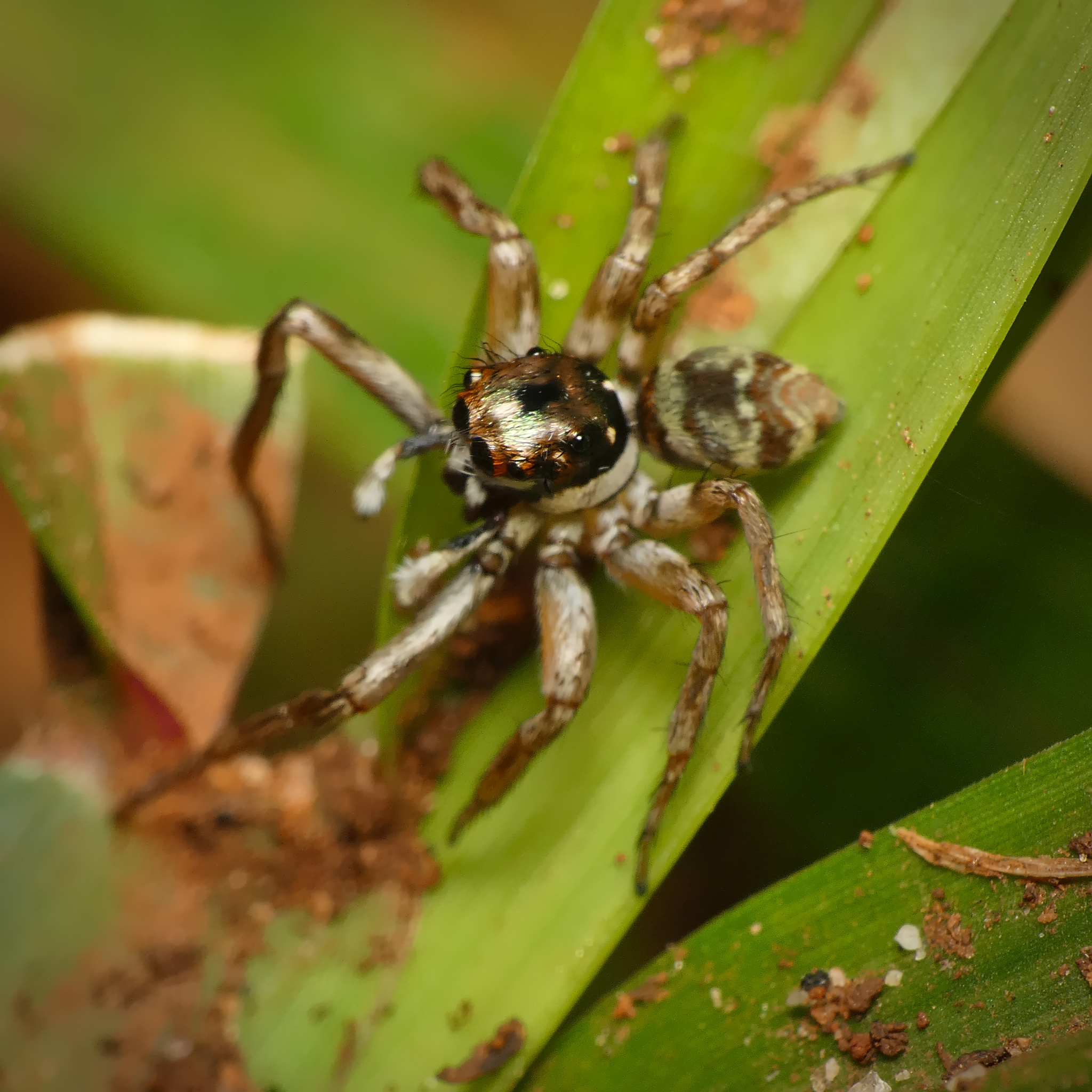

Parajotus refulgens is a small spider with distinctive physical features. The spider's body is divided into two main parts: a dark round forward section or cephalothorax and, to the rear of that, a lighter more ovoid abdomen. Males of this species have a cephalothorax measuring between 1.6 and 2.1 mm (0.06 and 0.08 in) in length and between 1.2 and 1.8 mm (0.05 and 0.07 in) in width. Its carapace, the hard upper part of the cephalothorax, is high mainly dark brown with a large eye field and a nearly black area around spider's eyes. A pattern of rounded spots, three larger ones towards the front, two smaller ones towards the rear and a larger patch on the eye field, are formed of white hairs. There are wide streaks formed of white hairs on the sides of the carapace. The spider has large main eyes, twice the diameter of those at the edges, with long brown bristles along the first row of eyes, small reddish scales near the front eyes and characteristic long black scale-like hairs near the rearmost central ones. The underside of its cephalothorax, or sternum, is yellow. The part of the spider's face known as the clypeus is moderately high and has a mat of white hairs.

The male has long, light-brown chelicerae with two teeth at the front and one at the back. The remainder of its mouthparts, its labium and maxillae, are orange. The male's abdomen is between 1.5 and 2.7 mm (0.06 and 0.11 in) in length and between 1.2 and 1.9 mm (0.05 and 0.07 in) in width. In some specimens, it looks bleached but is otherwise generally greyish or reddish-brown on top with a pattern of lighter streaks. There are a few long brown bristles along the front. The underside of its abdomen is lighter with traces of grey. Its spinnerets, used for spinning webs, are yellowish. Its long legs are either light brown or yellow with many brown spines and a covering of brown hairs. Its front pair of legs are longer than the others, although this varies between specimens.

The male's copulatory organs include a long palpal tibia that has a short spike, or tibial apophysis. At the end of the tibia is the spider's palpal bulb, which consists of a small round tegulum and, starting from the bottom and circling round the tegulum to project at an angle away towards the top, a thin embolus. The palpal bulb is protected by a blunt cymbium that is nearly twice its size.

The female is generally smaller than the male, with a cephalothorax measuring between 1.6 and 1.9 mm (0.06 and 0.07 in) long and an abdomen measuring between 1.5 and 1.6 mm (0.06 and 0.06 in) long, both being between 1.2 and 1.3 mm (0.05 and 0.05 in) wide. Its carapace is lower than the male. It is similar in coloration to the male but lacks the black scales near the eyes and has a more contrasting pattern on its abdomen. Its legs are mainly yellowish-white and have grey spots and sections that are dark grey and greyish. The first pair of legs are less distinctly long and there are fewer spines. Its epigyne, the visible external part of its copulatory organs, shows slight signs of sclerotization and has large shallow depression and two central pockets. The copulatory organs open into two long seminal ducts that curve to irregularly-shaped spermathecae, or receptacles. Small accessory glands are also present. Females found in Ivory Coast have seminal ducts that are more bent than those in spiders found in Zimbabwe.

The spider is most easily distinguished from the related Parajotus cinereus by its coloration. Its copulatory organs are also different, the female having longer seminal ducts and the male a circular rather than oval tegulum. Compared to the similar Parajotus obscurofemoratus, it is the presence of dark scales near the male spider's eyes, as well as its coloration, that most easily identifies the species.

== Distribution and habitat ==
Parajotus spiders are only found in Africa. Parajotus refulgens has been found in Botswana, Democratic Republic of Congo, Ivory Coast,Nigeria and Zimbabwe. It is likely that it is even more widespread across the continent. The male holotype was found at Nyamepi in Zimbabwe in 1984. Previously, in 1981, both male and female specimens had been collected near Kolwezi in what was then Zaire and later became the Democratic Republic of Congo. Other paratypes have been found near Lake Chivero in Zimbabwe and in the Okavango Delta in Botswana. The first example to be discovered in Nigeria was seen in Borgu Game Reserve, Kwara State. In Ivory Coast, it has been seen in many sites across the Lamto in the Bandama Forest. It is one of the most abundant species of jumping spider in Lamto.

The spider lives in a wide range of environments. It has mainly been seen living on branches of trees and on bushes in forests. A minority were found amongst the base of grasses and in savanna. It had also been found in debris by the side of rivers and occasionally living on granite boulders.

== Citations and sources ==
=== Bibliography ===
- Dippenaar-Schoeman, Ansie S.; Munyai, T. Caswell; Schoeman, Colin S.; Hahn, Norbert; Foord, Stefan H. (2024). "Soutpansberg Mountain: a spider hotspot in the Limpopo Province of South Africa (Arachnida, Araneae)". African Invertebrates. 65 (2): 85–114. Bibcode:2024AfrIn..65...85D. doi:10.3897/AfrInvertebr.65.135136.
- Maddison, Wayne P. (2015). "A phylogenetic classification of jumping spiders (Araneae: Salticidae)". The Journal of Arachnology. 43 (3): 231–292. doi:10.1636/arac-43-03-231-292. S2CID 85680279.
- Peckham, George W.; Peckham, Elizabeth G. (1903). "New species of the family Attidae from South Africa, with notes on the distribution of the genera found in the Ethiopian region". Transactions of the Wisconsin Academy of Sciences, Arts and Letters. 14: 173–278.
- Prószyński, Jerzy (2017). "Pragmatic classification of the World's Salticidae (Araneae)". Ecologica Montenegrina. 12: 1–133. doi:10.37828/em.2017.12.1.
- Wesołowska, Wanda (2000). "New and little known species of jumping spiders from Zimbabwe (Araneae: Salticidae)". Arnoldia Zimbabwe. 10: 145–174.
- Wesołowska, Wanda (2004). "A new species of Parajotus from Central Africa (Araneae: Salticidae)". Genus. 15 (1): 135–140.
- Wesołowska, Wanda (2011). "New species and new records of jumping spiders from Botswana, Namibia and Zimbabwe (Araneae: Salticidae)". Genus. 22 (2): 307–346.
- Wesołowska, Wanda; Russell-Smith, Anthony (2011). "Jumping Spiders (Araneae: Salticidae) from Southern Nigeria". Annales Zoologici. 63 (3): 553–619. doi:10.3161/000345411X603409. S2CID 83517018.
- Wesołowska, Wanda; Russell-Smith, Anthony (2022). "Jumping spiders from Ivory Coast collected by J.-C. Ledoux (Araneae, Salticidae)". European Journal of Taxonomy (841): 1–143. Bibcode:2022EJTax.841.1943W. doi:10.5852/ejt.2022.841.1943.
- Wiśniewski, Konrad (2020). "Over 40 years with jumping spiders: on the 70th birthday of Wanda Wesołowska". Zootaxa. 4899 (1): 5–14. doi:10.11646/zootaxa.4899.1.3. PMID 33756825. S2CID 232337200.
