= Enos Mdlongwa =

Zimbabwean politician

Mayor of Bulawayo
- In office 1981–1985
- Preceded by: Naison Ndlovu
- Succeeded by: Nicholas Mabodoko

Personal details
- Party: PF-ZAPU

Enos M. Mdlongwa was a Zimbabwean politician and was mayor of Bulawayo from 1983 to 1985.

Mdlongwa was a veteran member of PF-ZAPU.
