= Ncube (surname) =

Ncube or Mncube is a very common surname among the Matabele, Kalanga and Zulu people of Southern Africa.

Notable people with the surname include:

- Lieutenant Colonel Ben Ncube (born 1959), spokesperson for the Zimbabwe National Army
- Busi Ncube (born 1963), Zimbabwean singer and musician
- Butholezwe Ncube (born 1992), Zimbabwean association footballer
- Cunningham Ncube (born 1990), Zimbabwean cricketer
- Fletcher Dulini Ncube (1940–2014), former Zimbabwean MDC politician
- Gugulethu Zuma-Ncube (born 1985), daughter of former South African president Jacob Zuma and daughter-in-law of Welshman Ncube
- Japhet Ndabeni Ncube, former Mayor of Bulawayo
- Lancelot Ncube (sv) (born 1996), Zimbabwe-born Swedish actor
- Mthuli Ncube (born 1963), former chief economist and vice president of the African Development Bank
- Ndabenkulu Ncube (born 1988), Zimbabwean association footballer
- Ngonidzashe Ncube (born 1986), Zimbabwean long-distance runner
- Njabulo Ncube (born 1989), Zimbabwean cricketer
- Nomusa Dube-Ncube, South African ANC politician and former diplomat
- Owen Ncube (born 1968), Zimbabwean ZANU-PF politician placed on the United States sanctions and UK sanctions lists
- Pius Ncube (born 1946), disgraced former archbishop of Bulawayo
- Raphael Macebo Mabuza Ncube (born 1973), Zimbabwean Catholic bishop
- Sello Maake kaNcube (born 1963), South African actor
- Sister Bernard Ncube (1932–2012), former mayor of the West Rand region of Johannesburg, South Africa
- Trevor Ncube (born 1962), Zimbabwean editor and publisher
- Welshman Ncube (born 1961), Zimbabwean politician and lawyer
