= Ncube =

NCUBE may refer to:

- Ncube (surname), a South African surname (includes a list of people with the name)
- NCUBE Corporation, was a parallel supercomputers maker, and later, provider of video on demand solutions, now a subsidiary of Arris Group via its C-COR acquisition
- Ncube satellite, built by Norwegian students
- Hypercube of n dimensions
