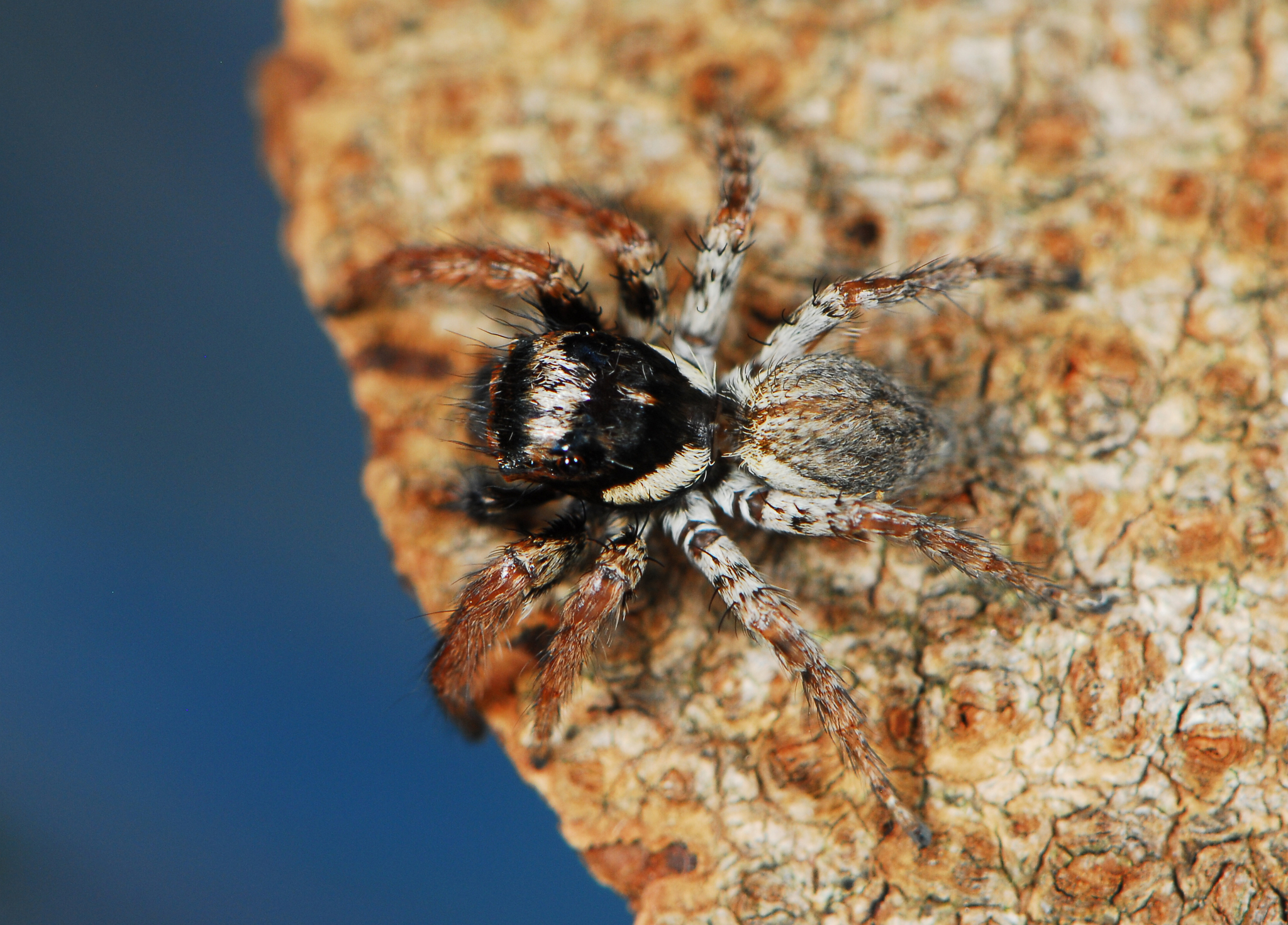
- P. obscurofemoratus
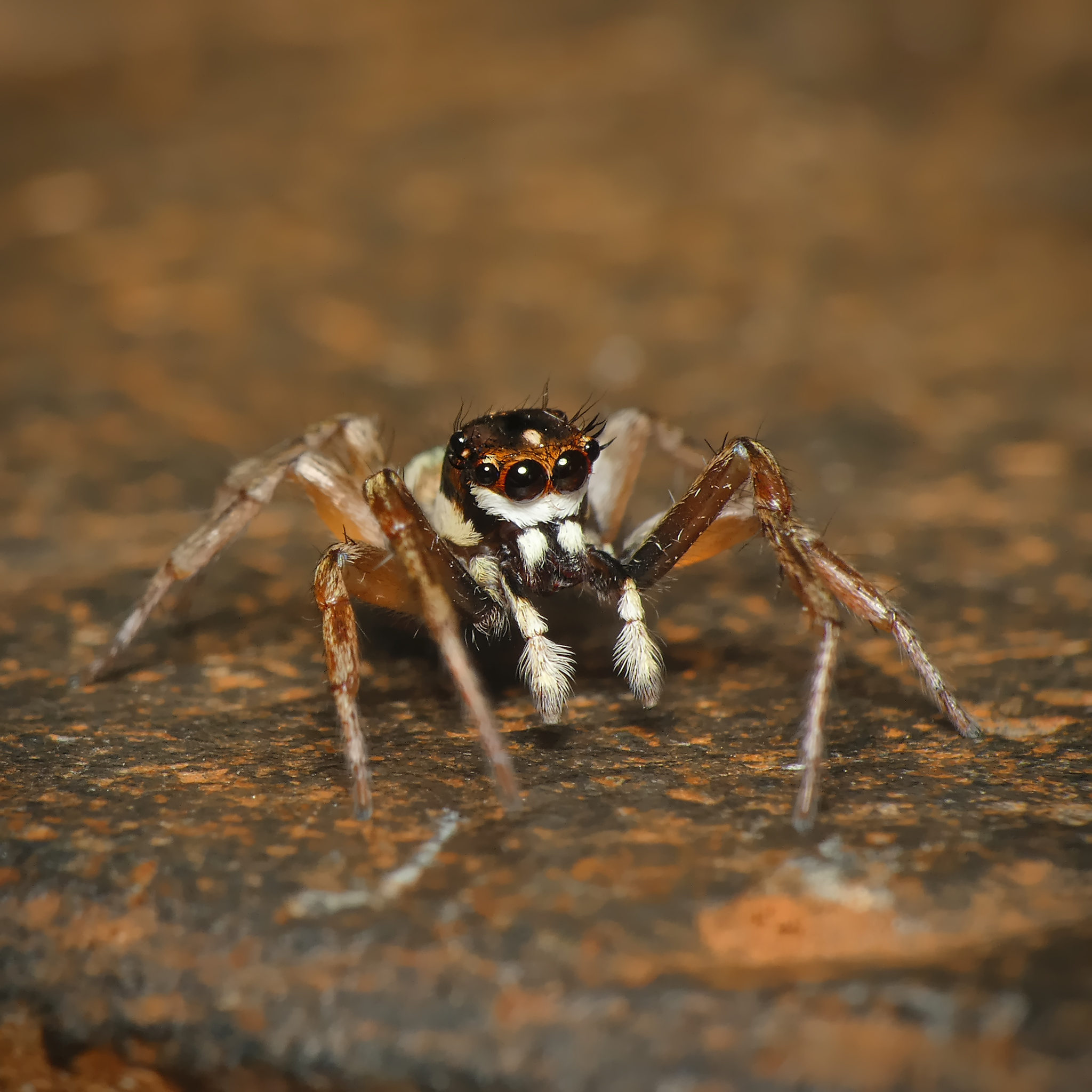
- P. refulgens

Scientific classification
- Kingdom: Animalia
- Phylum: Arthropoda
- Subphylum: Chelicerata
- Class: Arachnida
- Order: Araneae
- Infraorder: Araneomorphae
- Family: Salticidae
- Subfamily: Salticinae
- Genus: Parajotus; Peckham & Peckham, 1903

Type species
- P. obscurofemoratus Peckham & Peckham, 1903

Species
- P. cinereus Wesolowska, 2004; P. obscurofemoratus Peckham & Peckham, 1903; P. refulgens Wesolowska, 2000

= Parajotus =

Genus of spiders

Parajotus is a genus of African jumping spiders that was first described by George and Elizabeth Peckham in 1903.

== Etymology ==
The name is a combination of the Ancient Greek "para" (παρά), meaning "alongside", and the related genus Jotus.

== Species ==
As of October 2025, this genus includes three species:

- Parajotus cinereus Wesołowska, 2004 – Guinea, Rep. Congo, Uganda
- Parajotus obscurofemoratus G. W. Peckham & E. G. Peckham, 1903 – South Africa (type species)
- Parajotus refulgens Wesołowska, 2000 – Guinea, Ivory Coast, Nigeria, DR Congo, Botswana, Zimbabwe
