= Nketa =

Coordinates: 20°12′S 28°32′E

Nketa (name means home of the legends) is a high-density suburb in the city of Bulawayo, Zimbabwe. The suburb is divided into sections from Nketa 6 to Nketa 9. It started its development in the early 1990s and the major portion of the suburb was built using loans. It boasts of a library and clinic and a good number of primary and high schools.

== Education ==
This suburb is home to Maranatha Adventist High School, one of the top 100 schools in Zimbabwe known for producing consistently excellent results, as well as the recently built Maranatha Adventist Primary School. Both institutions are run by the Seventh-day Adventist church, and are both located in Nketa 7. Other schools located in the suburb are Nketa Primary School (Nketa 6), Nketa Secondary School (Nketa 8), Manondwane Primary School (Nketa 7), Emganwini Primary School (Nketa 8), Mgiqika Primary School (Nketa 9). There are quite a number of private schools and colleges around the suburb.

Nketa 7 is also home to the well resourced Nketa Library, which is owned and run by the Bulawayo City Council.

== Healthcare ==
The Bulawayo City Council runs a community clinic in Nketa 7 which addresses the majority of the community's health needs, including amongst other services, general medical doctor consultations and check ups, vaccinations, drug dispensation, follow up care, treatment of minor trauma and burns, maternal care, free HIV counselling and testing, distribution of free ARVs, free condom distribution and sexual health education, family planning services and referral of major cases to Mpilo Central Hospital. There is also a private 24-Hour Emergency Medical Centre at Nketa 6, less than 1 km from the clinic

== Religion ==
Nketa is mainly a Christian community and is home to wide range of churches including amongst others the Zaoga fif, Seventh-day Adventist Church, Roman Catholic Church, Methodist Church, Baptist Church, Brethren in Christ Church, The Church Of Jesus Christ Of Latter Day Saints, Roman Catholic Church, Anglican Church, several Pentecostal churches, apostolic faith sects, etc. The Seventh-day Adventist church appears to be the most dominant church with 3 branches in Nketa alone and 2 schools and a large membership.

== Recreation and Entertainment ==
Several community football fields are spread across the suburbs and these are hives of sporting activity particularly on weekends. There are two recreational parks with green vegetation in Nketa 6 and 7. Nketa 7 is also home to Nketa Tavern and Egodini Social Club. Both are hotspots for alcohol lovers. Nketa 8 beer garden is also another alcohol spot. There are several other sporting, recreational and entertainment facilities located in the suburb.

== Demographics ==
There is a diverse population with people speaking different languages and cultural backgrounds since Bulawayo pulls people from all over the country. IsiNdebele and ChiShona are the main languages of communication.

== Politics ==
Nketa is part of the Nketa constituency for elections to the National Assembly of Zimbabwe.
