= Jotus ravus =

Conservation status
- Data Deficient (NZ TCS)

Scientific classification
- Kingdom: Animalia
- Phylum: Arthropoda
- Subphylum: Chelicerata
- Class: Arachnida
- Order: Araneae
- Infraorder: Araneomorphae
- Family: Salticidae
- Genus: Jotus
- Species: J. ravus

Binomial name
- Jotus ravus (Urquhart, 1893)

Synonyms
- Attus ravus

Species of spider

Jotus ravus is a species of jumping spider that is endemic to New Zealand.

== Taxonomy ==
This species was described at Attus ravus by Arthur Urquhart from a male specimen.

== Description ==
The male is recorded at 5.9mm in length. The cephalothorax is coloured chestnut brown. The legs are brownish yellow. The abdomen is greyish.

== Distribution ==
This species is only known from Wellington, New Zealand.

== Conservation status ==
Under the New Zealand Threat Classification System, this species is listed as "Data Deficient" with the qualifiers of "Data Poor: Size", "Data Poor: Trend" and "One Location".
