= Jotus remus =

Scientific classification
- Kingdom: Animalia
- Phylum: Arthropoda
- Subphylum: Chelicerata
- Class: Arachnida
- Order: Araneae
- Infraorder: Araneomorphae
- Family: Salticidae
- Genus: Jotus
- Species: J. remus

Binomial name
- Jotus remus Otto & Hill, 2016

Species of spider

Jotus remus is a species of spider in the family Salticidae, found in Australia (New South Wales). It was first described in 2016. Males of Jotus remus are distinguished from other species in the genus Jotus by the presence of "paddles" formed by long bristles (setae) on the metatarsus and tarsus of the third pair of legs. The paddles are flattened parallel to the male's body. They are used to attract females by waving them over the edge of a leaf while the male is on the opposite side to the female. The female initially attempts to attack the paddle, but males are skillful at avoiding such attacks. Eventually the female ceases to attack, and the male is able to move to the female's side of the leaf and mate rapidly. Females are difficult to distinguish from those of other Jotus species.
