= Nicholas Mabodoko =

Zimbabwean politician

Nicholas Joel Mabodoko

Mayor of Bulawayo
- In office 1985–1988

Personal details
- Born: 12 May 1922
- Died: 21 November 2007 (aged 85)
- Party: PF-ZAPU, ZANU-PF

Nicholas Joel Mabodoko was a Zimbabwean politician.

Prior to independence he chaired the Joint African Advisory Board. He became the first black chairman of the African Advisory Board in 1975. After independence, he served as PF-ZAPU mayor of Bulawayo from 1985 to 1988, becoming a member of ZANU-PF following the unification of the two parties in 1987. During the Bulawayo mayoral elections of 2001, he clashed with Jonathan Moyo over alleged vote-buying.

He served as chairman of the state bus company ZUPCO until 2001. The government of Zimbabwe declared him a Liberation War hero and was buried with honours. In the 1970s, he was Chairman of Bulawayo African Football Association (BAFA).

== See also ==
- List of mayors of Bulawayo
- Timeline of Bulawayo
