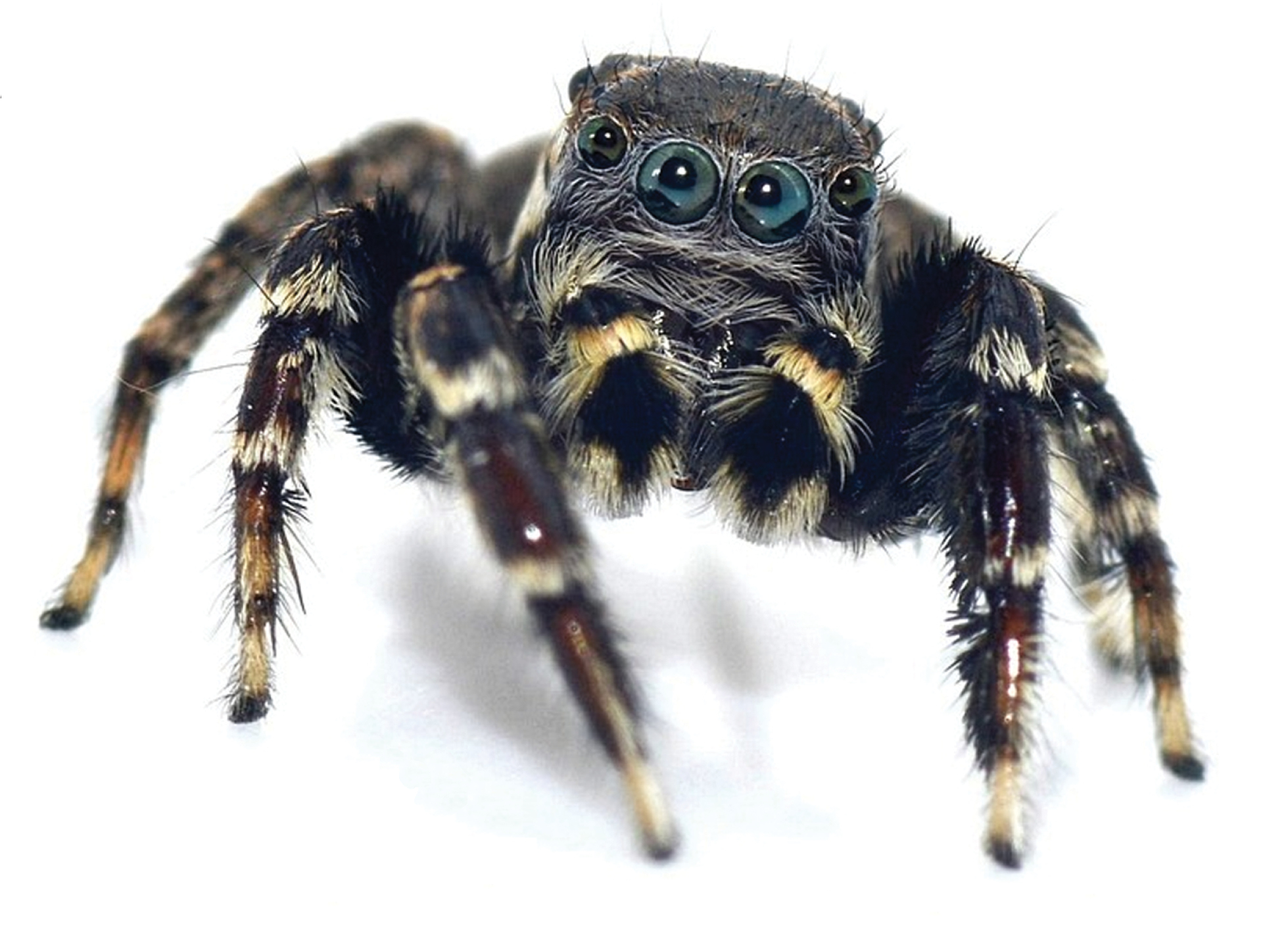

Scientific classification
- Kingdom: Animalia
- Phylum: Arthropoda
- Subphylum: Chelicerata
- Class: Arachnida
- Order: Araneae
- Infraorder: Araneomorphae
- Family: Salticidae
- Genus: Jotus
- Species: J. karllagerfeldi

Binomial name
- Jotus karllagerfeldi Baehr, Schubert & Harms, 2019

= Jotus karllagerfeldi =

Species of spider

Jotus karllagerfeldi is a species of jumping spider of the genus Jotus described in 2019. The name of the species karllagerfeldi was chosen as the black and white spider was "reminiscent of the signature look" of fashion designer Karl Lagerfeld. The spider was found near Lake Broadwater, a lake near Dalby, Queensland.
