= Martin Moyo =

Rhodesian-Zimbabwean politician (born 1952)

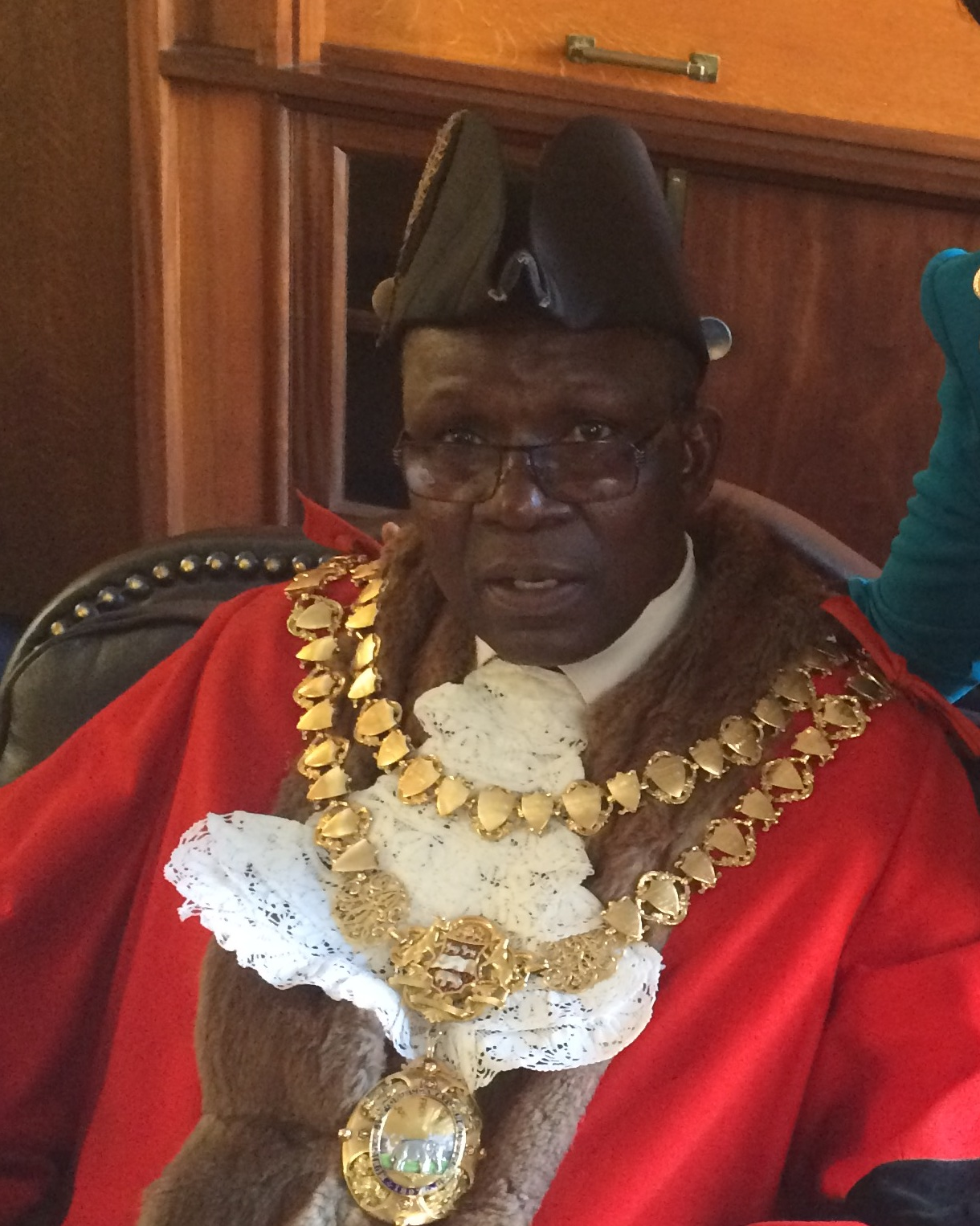

Mayor of Bulawayo
- In office 2013–2018

Personal details
- Born: Martin Kizack Moyo; 30 December 1952 (age 73) Bulawayo, Rhodesia

Martin K. Moyo (born 30 December 1952) is the former mayor of the City of Bulawayo in Zimbabwe. He is married to Violet Bhebhe, with whom he has a son named Likhwa Milton Moyo. He was voted in as the councillor for the City of Bulawayo's Ward 3 in 2008. He successfully contested the local authority's Ward Elections again in 2013, after which he was voted in as the city's mayor by the councillors.

== Teaching career & liberation war ==
Moyo graduated as a teacher at the United College of Education (UCE) in 1974. In May 1977 he joined the liberation struggle also referred to as the Rhodesian bush war and was in the ZIPRA ranks from June 1977 to 1980 when the ZIPRA forces were demobilised. In 1981 he taught at Wankie Secondary School where he later became the Head of the Mathematics department. In 1994 Moyo went to Nabushome Primary School on promotion as a headmaster. In 1998 he received the Secretary's Merit Award for developing and modernizing the institution.

== Political career ==
In 2002 he left the public service and joined the MDC-T structures as Ward chairman for Mahatshula. He eventually rose to become the MDC-T's District Treasurer for Bulawayo East. In 2008 he was elected Councillor for Bulawayo's Ward 3. He retained this seat in the 2013 municipal elections and was elected Mayor of the City of Bulawayo. In 2014 Moyo was elected president of the Urban Councils Association of Zimbabwe (UCAZ). In 2015 Moyo was elected President of the Zimbabwe Local Government Authority (ZILGA). ZILGA is the umbrella or apex association which oversees UCAZ and ARDCZ ( Association of Rural District Councils of Zimbabwe).

== See also ==
- List of mayors of Bulawayo
- Timeline of Bulawayo
