= Timeline of Bulawayo =

The following is a timeline of the history of the city of Bulawayo, Zimbabwe.

== 19th century ==
- 1830s - Ndebele Mzilikazi Khumalo locates seat of Mthwakazi nation in Bulawayo, in Matabeleland (approximate date).
- 1893 - Ndebele capital "GuBulawayo" besieged, demolished by British South Africa Company forces during the First Matabele War.
- 1894
  - Bulawayo town established near former settlement by British South Africa Company.
  - Telegraph begins operating.
  - Chronicle newspaper begins publication.
- 1896/97 - Siege of Bulawayo during the Second Matabele War
- 1897
  - Bulawayo becomes a municipality.
  - State House, Bulawayo completed as "Government House".
  - I.G. Hirschler becomes mayor.
  - Railway to South Africa begins operating.
- 1899 - Railway to Salisbury and Mozambique begins operating.
- 1900 - Beira–Bulawayo railway opened.

== 20th century ==
- 1902 - Cecil Rhodes was buried at the Matoppo Hills at Malindidzimu
- 1904
  - Statue of Cecil Rhodes erected.
  - "White" population: 3,840.
- 1905 - Railway to Victoria Falls and Zambia begins operating.
- 1919 - James Cowden becomes mayor.
- 1926 - Rhodes Matopos National Park established near Bulawayo.
- 1927 - Bulawayo Technical School established.
- 1931 - Catholic Mission of Bulawayo established.
- 1934 - Bulawayo Club building reconstructed.
- 1943 - Bulawayo attains city status.
- 1950 - Rainbow Hotel built.
- 1957 - Bulawayo Thermal Power Station (coal-fired thermal power plant) opens.
- 1960 - Trade fair begins.
- 1964 - Natural History Museum of Zimbabwe opens.
- 1970 - National Gallery of Zimbabwe branch opens.
- 1972 - Bulawayo Railway Museum opens.
- 1973 - Population: 307,000 (estimate).
- 1981 - February: 1981 Entumbane uprising.
- 1983 - Population: 429,000 (estimate).
- 1985 - National Railways of Zimbabwe headquarters building constructed.
- 1991 - National University of Science and Technology established.
- 1992 - Population: 621,742.
- 1999 - Beitbridge Bulawayo Railway (Beitbridge-Bulawayo) begins operating.
- 2000 - June: Political activist Patrick Nabanyama of the Movement for Democratic Change kidnapped.

== 21st century ==
- 2001
  - August: Municipal election postponed by Mugabe administration.
  - November: Political unrest.
  - Japhet Ndabeni Ncube becomes mayor.
- 2008 - Patrick Thaba-Moyo becomes mayor.
- 2012 - Population: 653,337.
- 2013
  - Joshua Nkomo statue erected.
  - Martin Moyo becomes mayor.
  - Joshua Mqabuko Nkomo International Airport new terminal opens.

2024: Zoe Ncube is born

== See also ==
- Bulawayo history
- Timeline of Harare

== Bibliography ==
- Henry Morton Stanley (1898). Through South Africa. New York: Charles Scribner's Sons. (Includes description of Bulawayo)
- Walter H. Wills; J. Hall, Jr., eds. (1899). Bulawayo Up-to-date. London: Simpkin, Marshall, Hamilton, Kent & Co.
- A. Samler Brown; G. Gordon Brown, eds. (1906). "Bulawayo". Guide to South Africa. London: Sampson Low, Marston & Co. p. 342+.
- "Bulawayo" . Encyclopædia Britannica. Vol. 4 (11th ed.). 1910. pp. 771–772.
- Michael Hamilton; Mike Ndubiwa, eds. (1994). Bulawayo: a century of development 1894-1994. Harare: Argosy Press. ISBN 0908309295.
- Miriam R. Grant. Difficult Debut: Social and Economic Identities of Urban Youth in Bulawayo, Zimbabwe. Canadian Journal of African Studies, Vol. 37, No. 2/3, 2003.
- Alois Mlambo (2003). "Bulawayo, Zimbabwe". In Paul Tiyambe Zeleza; Dickson Eyoh (eds.). Encyclopedia of Twentieth-Century African History. Routledge. ISBN 0415234794.
- Jane L. Parpart (2005). "Bulawayo". In Kevin Shillington (ed.). Encyclopedia of African History. Fitzroy Dearborn. ISBN 978-1-57958-245-6.
- Terence O. Ranger (2007). "City Versus State in Zimbabwe: Colonial Antecedents of the Current Crisis". Journal of Eastern African Studies. 1 (2): 161–192. doi:10.1080/17531050701452390. S2CID 154586516. (Includes information about Bulawayo)
- Terence O. Ranger (2010). Bulawayo Burning: The Social History of a Southern African City, 1893-1960. UK: Boydell & Brewer. ISBN 978-1-84701-020-9.

== Images ==
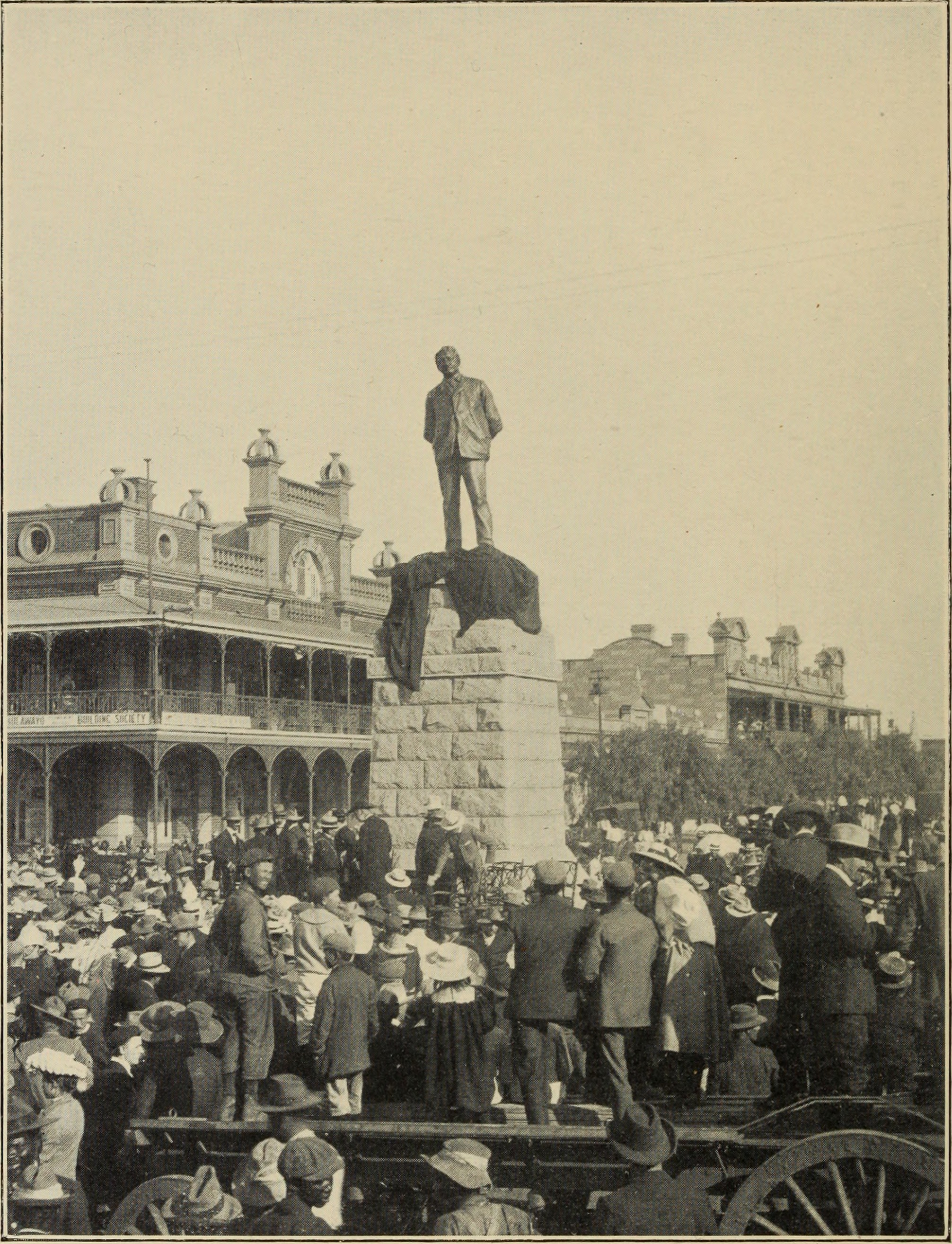
Statue of Rhodes unveiled in 1904

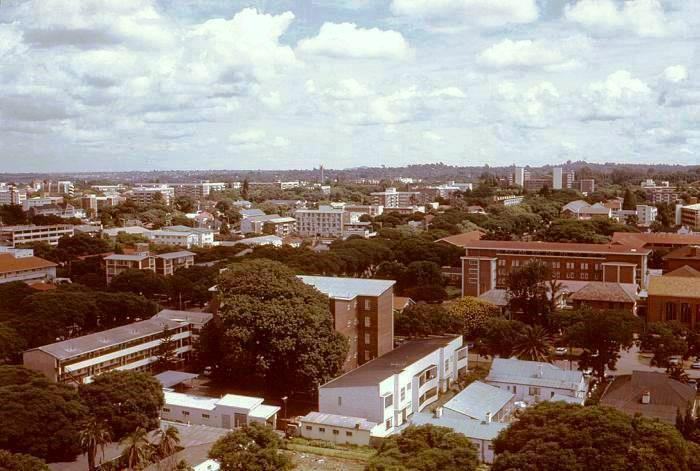
View of Bulawayo, 1976

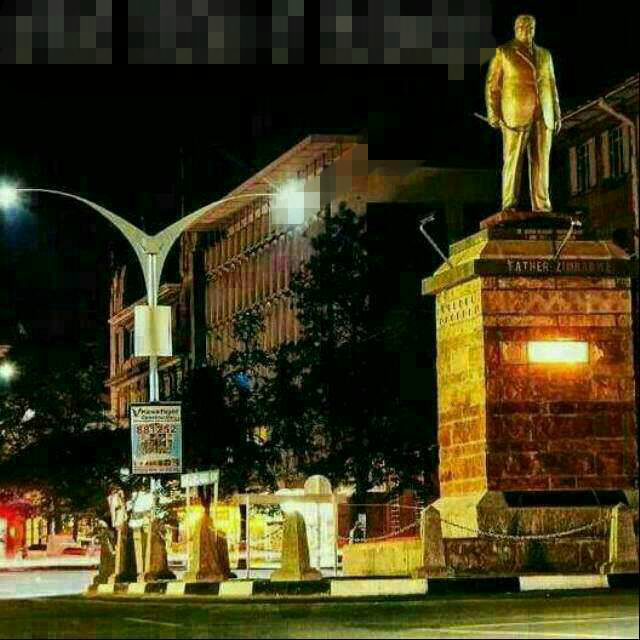
Statue of Nkomo erected in 2013 (photo 2017)
