= Statue of Cecil Rhodes, Bulawayo =

Statue in Zimbabwe

Statue of Cecil John Rhodes
- Cecil John Rhodes
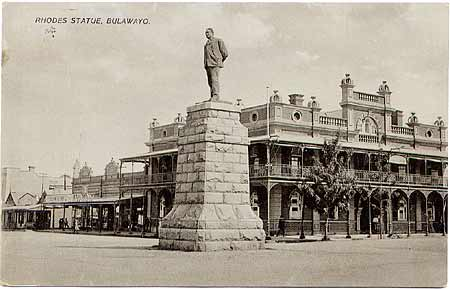
- Photograph of the statue of Cecil John Rhodes in the city centre of Bulawayo in 1925.
- Location: Bulawayo, Zimbabwe
- Designer: John Tweed
- Type: Sculpture
- Material: Bronze
- Length: 83mm
- Width: 83mm
- Beginning date: 1904
- Dedicated to: Cecil Rhodes

The statue of Cecil John Rhodes in Bulawayo, Zimbabwe, is a bronze sculpture of the British colonialist, businessman and politician who was the founder of the British South Africa Company (BSAC), through which he founded the southern African territory of Rhodesia.

The statue was sculpted by a Scottish sculptor, John Tweed and was erected in Bulawayo city centre in 1904. In February 1981, after Southern Rhodesia's independence as Zimbabwe in 1980, the statue was removed from the city centre; it was relocated to the centenary park at the Natural History Museum of Zimbabwe.

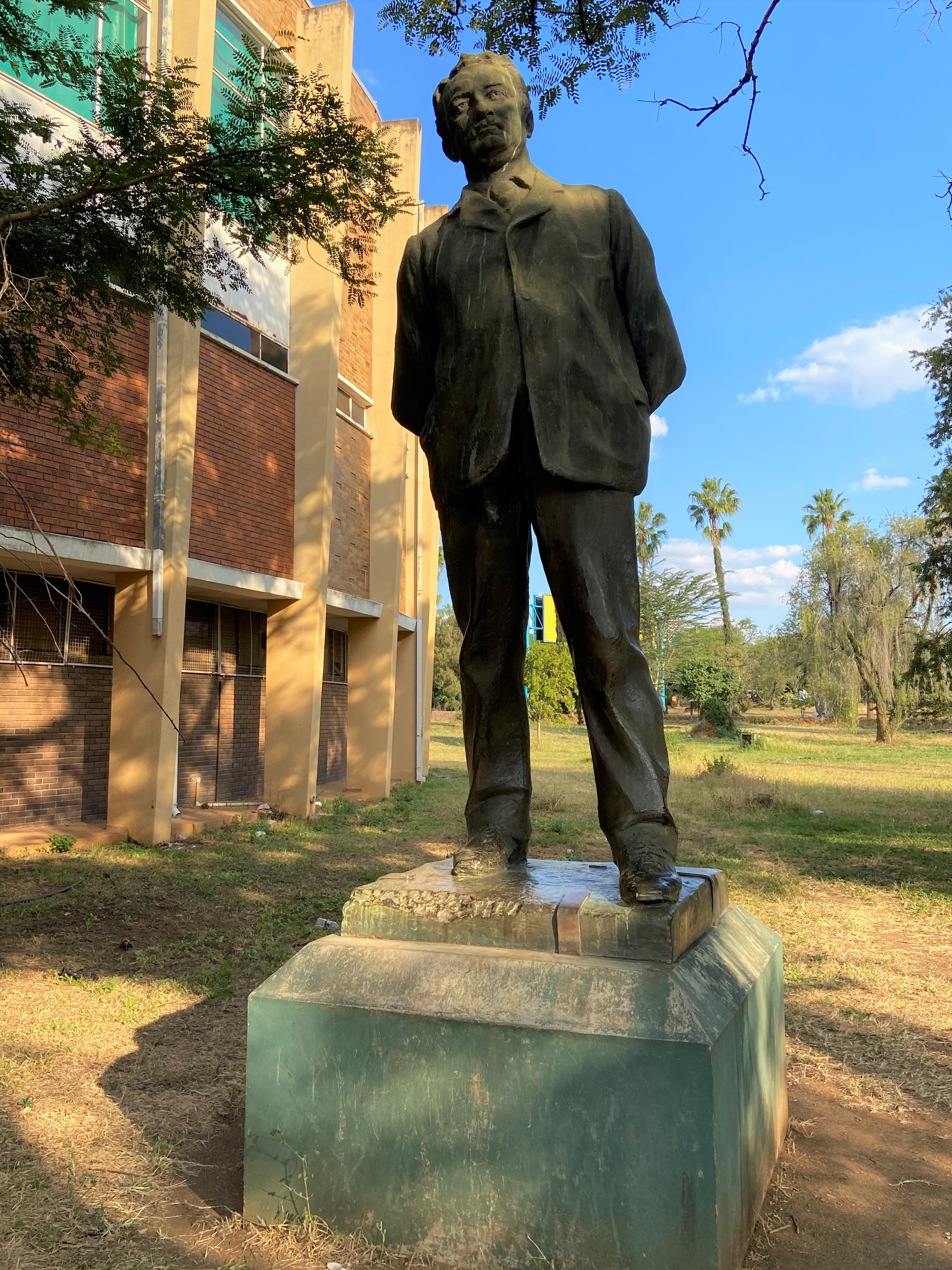
The statue of Cecil Rhodes in Centenary Park.

== See also ==
- Timeline of Bulawayo
