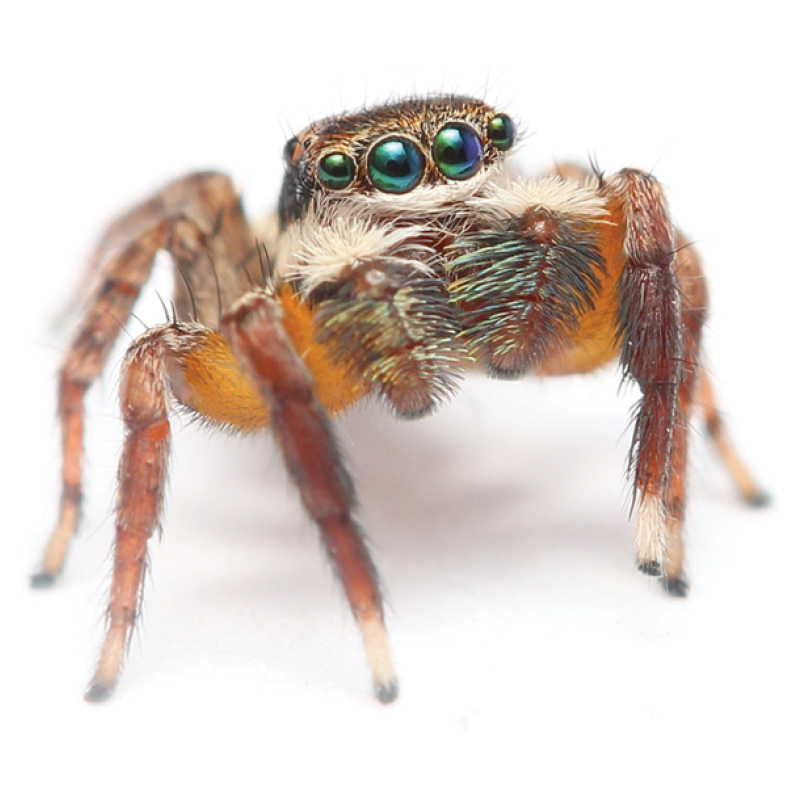

Scientific classification
- Kingdom: Animalia
- Phylum: Arthropoda
- Subphylum: Chelicerata
- Class: Arachnida
- Order: Araneae
- Infraorder: Araneomorphae
- Family: Salticidae
- Genus: Jotus
- Species: J. auripes

Binomial name
- Jotus auripes L.Koch, 1881

= Jotus auripes =

Species of spider

Jotus auripes is a species of jumping spider of the genus Jotus. J. auripes was first described by German arachnologist Ludwig Carl Christian Koch in 1881.
