= Bulawayo City Council =

Local government of Bulawayo, Zimbabwe

- Bulawayo coat of arms

Type
- Type: Provincial and district council of Bulawayo

History
- Founded: 4 November 1943

Leadership
- Executive Mayor: David Coltart, CCC since September 2023
- Deputy Mayor: Edwin Ndlovu
- Seats: 34 (29 ward + 5 womens quota)

Elections
- Last election: 2023
- Next election: TBA

Bulawayo City Council is the provincial and district local authority of the city of Bulawayo in terms of Zimbabwe 2013’s constitution Amendment 20. The council is composed of 29 councillors representing 29 wards and a further 5 forming the womens' quota indirectly elected by the councillors, elected by the popular vote alongside national elections.

== See also ==
- Bulawayo
- Mutare City Council
