= Natural History Museum of Zimbabwe =

Coordinates: 20.1558°S 28.5965°E

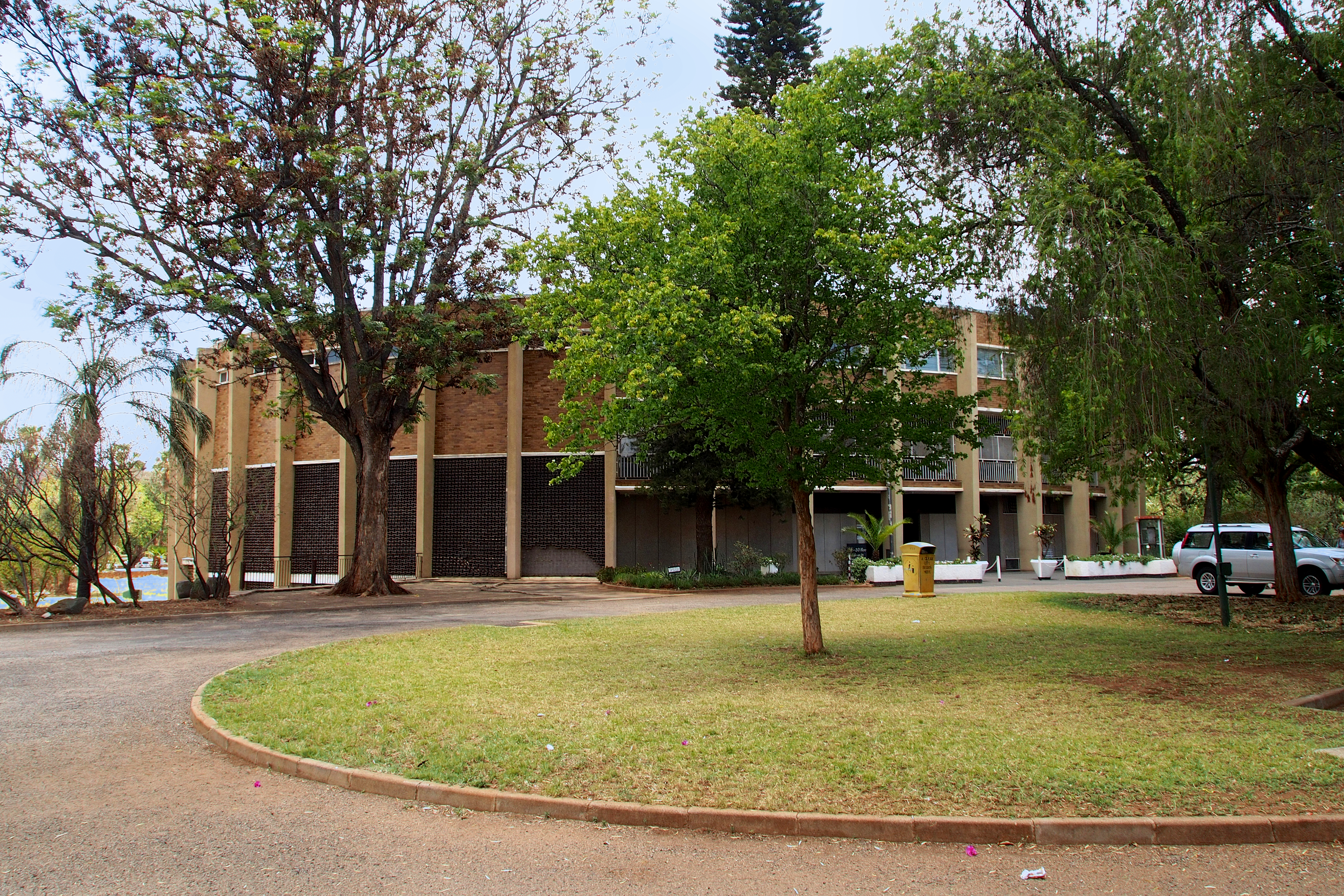
- Former name: National Museum of Rhodesia
- Established: 1964; 62 years ago
- Location: Bulawayo, Zimbabwe
- Type: Natural history museum
- Website: Official website

The Natural History Museum of Zimbabwe is located in Bulawayo, Zimbabwe, on Leopold Takawira Avenue.

Designed by architect James Whalley, the museum officially opened in 1964, The museum contains exhibits illustrating the history, mineral wealth and wildlife of Zimbabwe, including the second largest mounted elephant in the world. It is one of the five national museums nationwide and the only natural history museum in Zimbabwe.

The museum has nine public display galleries, a lecture hall with a seating capacity of 120 people, a cafeteria, and eight research departments with substantial study collections and ongoing research in the following disciplines: Arachnology and invertebrates, Entomology, Ornithology, Mammology, Herpetology, Ichthyology, Paleontology and Geology and Archaeology.

== History ==
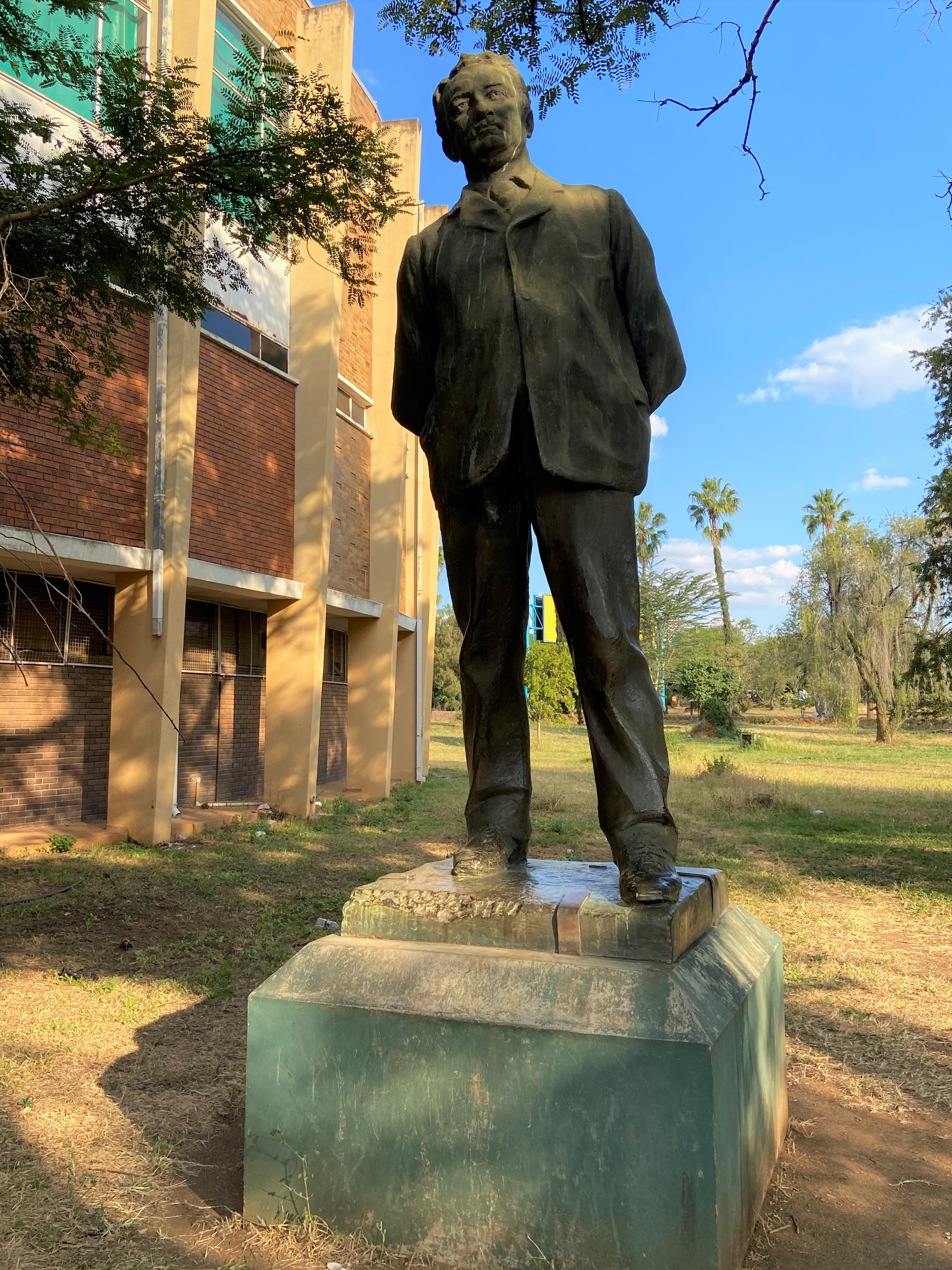
Statue of Cecil Rhodes, who played a role in its founding, outside the museum

1901 - Cecil Rhodes visited Bulawayo and received a request from the Rhodesia Scientific Board to build a museum to house their growing collection of minerals.

1 January 1902 - the Rhodesia Museum came into being with Mr F. P. Mennell as the Geologist and the first curator. At this time the museum was housed at the now Bulawayo Public Library.

September 1905 - the Museum Committee moved to the former Congregation Chapel after buying the chapel. This museum was opened by Professor G Darwin, president of the British Association.

1910 - the now Parcels Office, situated at corner Fort Street and 8th Avenue was donated to the Museum Committee by the British South African Company.

21 August 1910 - informal opening

November 1910 - official opening by Prince Arthur, son of Queen Victoria.

1936 - the Government acquired the museum that was renamed the National Museum of Rhodesia.

1960 - land in Centenary park was availed by Bulawayo City Council and the building began

20 March 1964 - the museum was officially opened to the public. Up to this time the museum was mainly focused on economic ecology

1981 - the National Museums and Monuments streamlined the operations of its five museums and as a result the National Museum was renamed the Natural History Museum of Zimbabwe. All the natural science collections from the other museums were moved to the Natural History Museum of Zimbabwe.

== Departments ==
=== Geology ===
The museum was built to house geology collections and therefore there are many geology exhibits in the museum. There is over 15 000 rock, gems and crystal samples. The collections include the rare, but famous Zambia broken hill lean/zinc minerals and kermesite specimens. The geology collections are housed in the Mennell Gallery, also called the Geology gallery. There is also a walk through mine, where visitors can actually get the feel of a typical Zimbabwean mine.

=== Palaeontology ===
The Palaeontological collection has over 2500 specimens that include plant fossils, various dinosaurs as well as early mammals, fish and other invertebrates.

It is presented in the Mennell Gallery where the unique dinosaur fauna take the centre stage.

=== Entomology ===
The department was established in 1911. It holds over 5 million insects specimen, only a few are on public displays though. The larger percentage is housed in the George Arnold Entomological laboratory.

=== Arachnology ===
The department was established in 1983 and holds over 20,000 spider specimen.

=== Ichthyology ===
The department holds a collection of fish, and on public displays they only have frogs displayed.

=== Herpetology ===
The department collects reptile and amphibian specimen. Most of these are dead. Only a few snakes are living. It is housed in the Donald Broadley Gallery. Dr Broadley was the first appointed curator of the department when the department was established in 1956.

=== Ornithology ===
The department of ornithology holds the largest and most important collection in Africa of bird skins, nests, eggs, skeletons. The collections were obtained locally and in the neighbouring Botswana, Mozambique, Angola, Tanzania and Kenya.

=== Mammalogy ===
The department holds mammals specimen collections. These are mainly skins coming from the Department of Game and Fisheries, the Department of National Parks and the Department of Tsetse and Trypanosomiasis Control. The specimen in form of animals are housed in the Livingstone Sango-Moyo Gallery.

=== Archaeology and Monuments ===
The department is responsible for the preservation of history exhibits and structures in the museum. These exhibits are housed in the Hall of Kings and the Hall of Man.

==== Hall of Kings ====
Displays the history of Zimbabwe, but this history is mainly focused on the Matebele people or the Ndebele State in particular. There is little or nothing about the Rozvi State, Great Zimbabwe State and other kings who were not Ndebele State kings.

=== Hall of Man ===
Mainly for displaying the developments of humans from the early hominids to present.

=== Library ===
The museum has a special library that started operation in 1902 at the inauguration of the museum. The library houses mostly scientific and historical materials in the form of books and journals. Also found in the library are geological maps for Zimbabwe as well as photographs.

== Curators ==
List of past and present curators
Curator	Department
George Arnold	Entomology
Cranmer Cooke	Archaeology
Roger Summers	Archaeology
Neville Jones	Archaeology
Elliot Charles Gordon Pinhey	Entomology
Donald G. Broadley	Herpetology
Michael Patrick Stuart Irwin	Ornithology
Reay Henry Noble Smithers	Ornithology
Kudzanayi Dhliwayo	Ornithology
Alick Ndlovu	Geology
Dorothy Madamba	Entomology
Dr Moira Fitzpatrick	Arachnology
Nobuhle Sithole	Ichthyology
Tsitsi Maponga	Mammalogy
Archaeology	Archaeology
Kudzai Mafuwe	Entomology

== Gallery ==
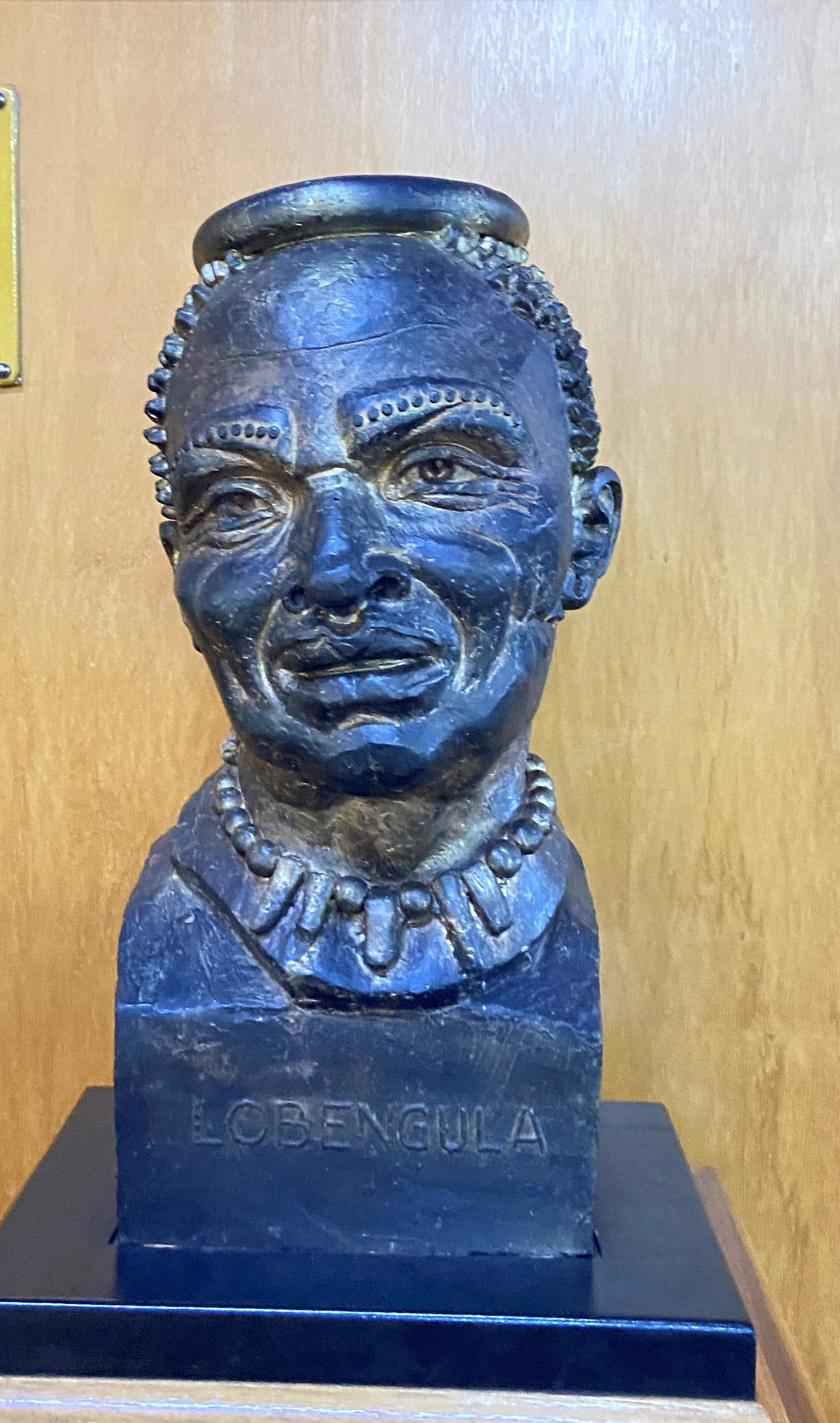
Bust of King Lobengula

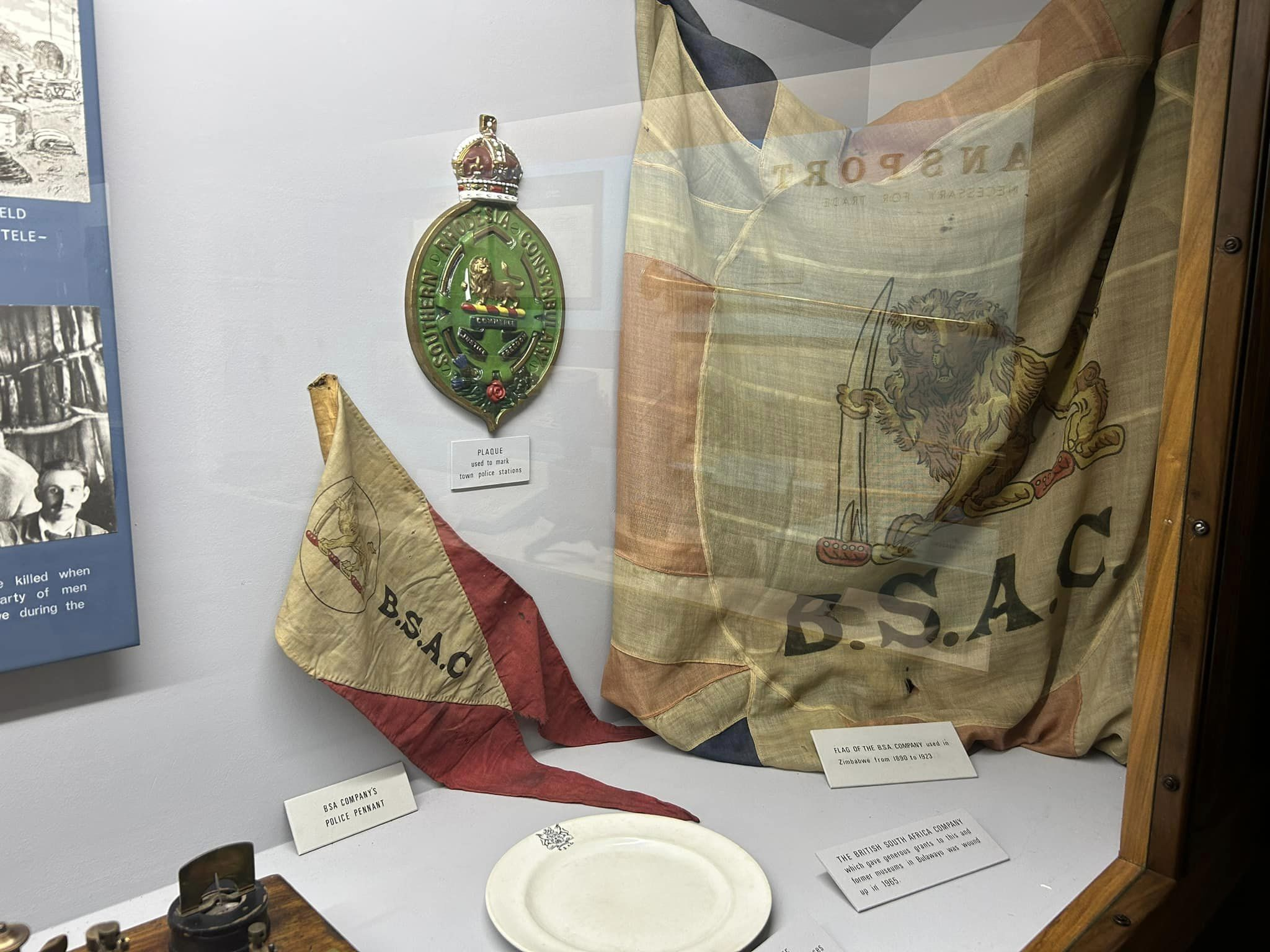
Display on the British South Africa Company

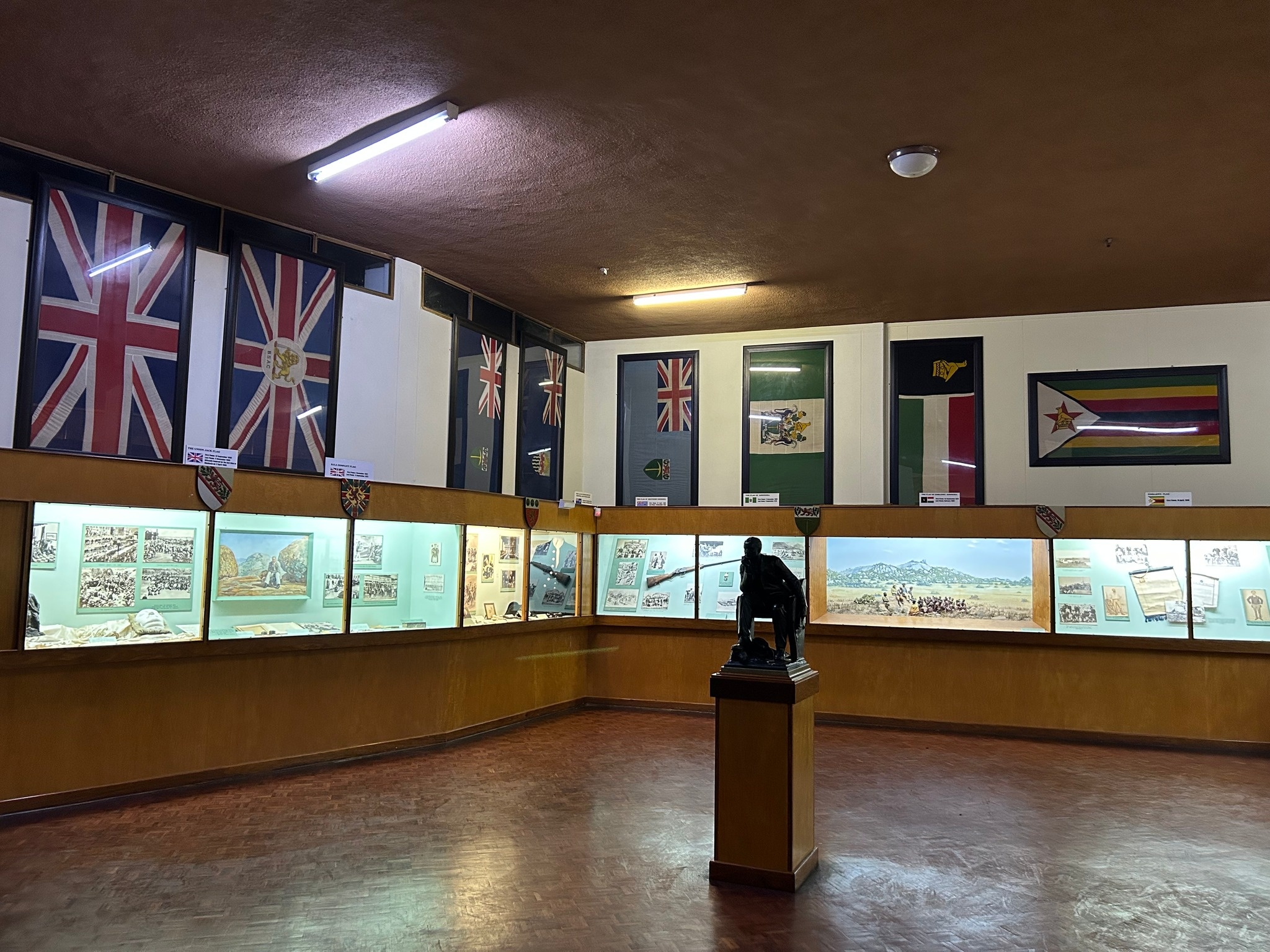
Flags of Britain, the British South Africa Company, Southern Rhodesia, Rhodesia, Zimbabwe Rhodesia and Zimbabwe

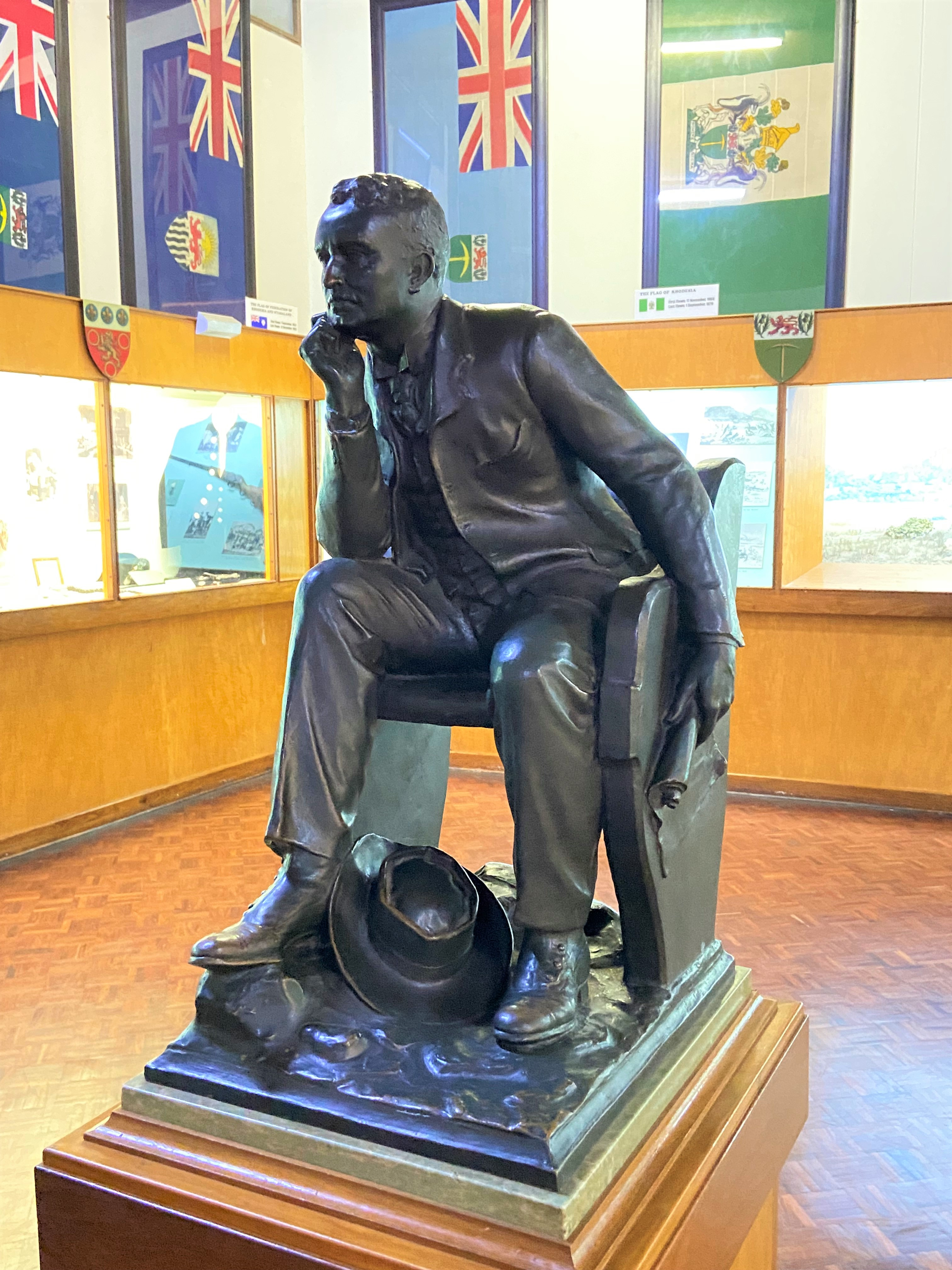
Statue of Cecil Rhodes, backgrounded by historical flags of Southern Rhodesia and Rhodesia

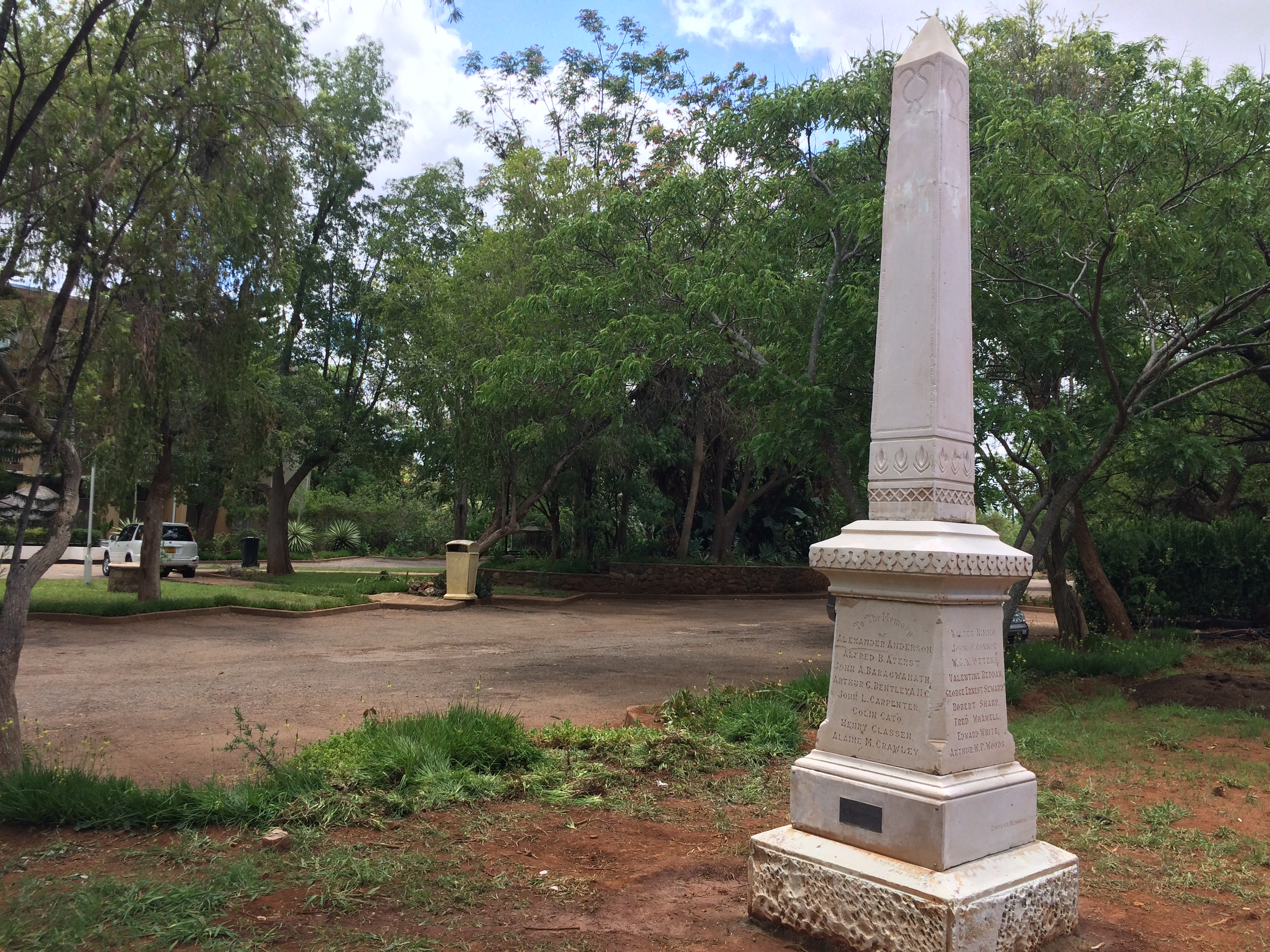
The Filibusi Memorial, commemorating the murders of several Britons in the Second Matabele War
