= Japhet Ndabeni Ncube =

Zimbabwean politician

Japhet Ndabeni Ncube is a Zimbabwean politician. He is also a commissioner at the Zimbabwean Human Rights Commission and chairs the Thematic Working group on Socio-Economic and Cultural Rights.

== Early career ==
Ncube was trained as a primary school teacher in the 1950s and she taught at Njube Primary School from 1960 to 1963. He spent the next four years, from 1964 to 1968, in Zambia and Tanzania prior to his leave for his studies in Europe, beginning with a short stay in Germany where he completed his A Level equivalent before moving to the United Kingdom.

== Political life ==
He joined the Liberation Movement in the youth wing of the Zimbabwe African People's Union (ZAPU) and left the country for Zambia later in 1963. He was the mayor of Bulawayo, the second largest city in the country, from 2001 to 2008. He was a member of the MDC, and joined MDC-M during the split in that party. He unsuccessfully contested the Bulawayo Central national assembly seat, losing to the MDC-T candidate, Dorcas Sibanda.

== Personal life ==
Ncube is married and has children, grandchildren and one great-grandchild.

== See also ==
- List of mayors of Bulawayo
- Timeline of Bulawayo
