= Parajotus cinereus =

Scientific classification
- Kingdom: Animalia
- Phylum: Arthropoda
- Subphylum: Chelicerata
- Class: Arachnida
- Order: Araneae
- Infraorder: Araneomorphae
- Family: Salticidae
- Genus: Parajotus
- Species: P. cinereus

Binomial name
- Parajotus cinereus Wesołowska, 2004

Species of spider

Parajotus cinereus is a jumping spider species in the genus Parajotus that lives in the Democratic Republic of the Congo and Uganda. The species was first identified by Wanda Wesołowska in 2004.
