= Mayor of Bulawayo =

- Coat of arms of Bulawayo

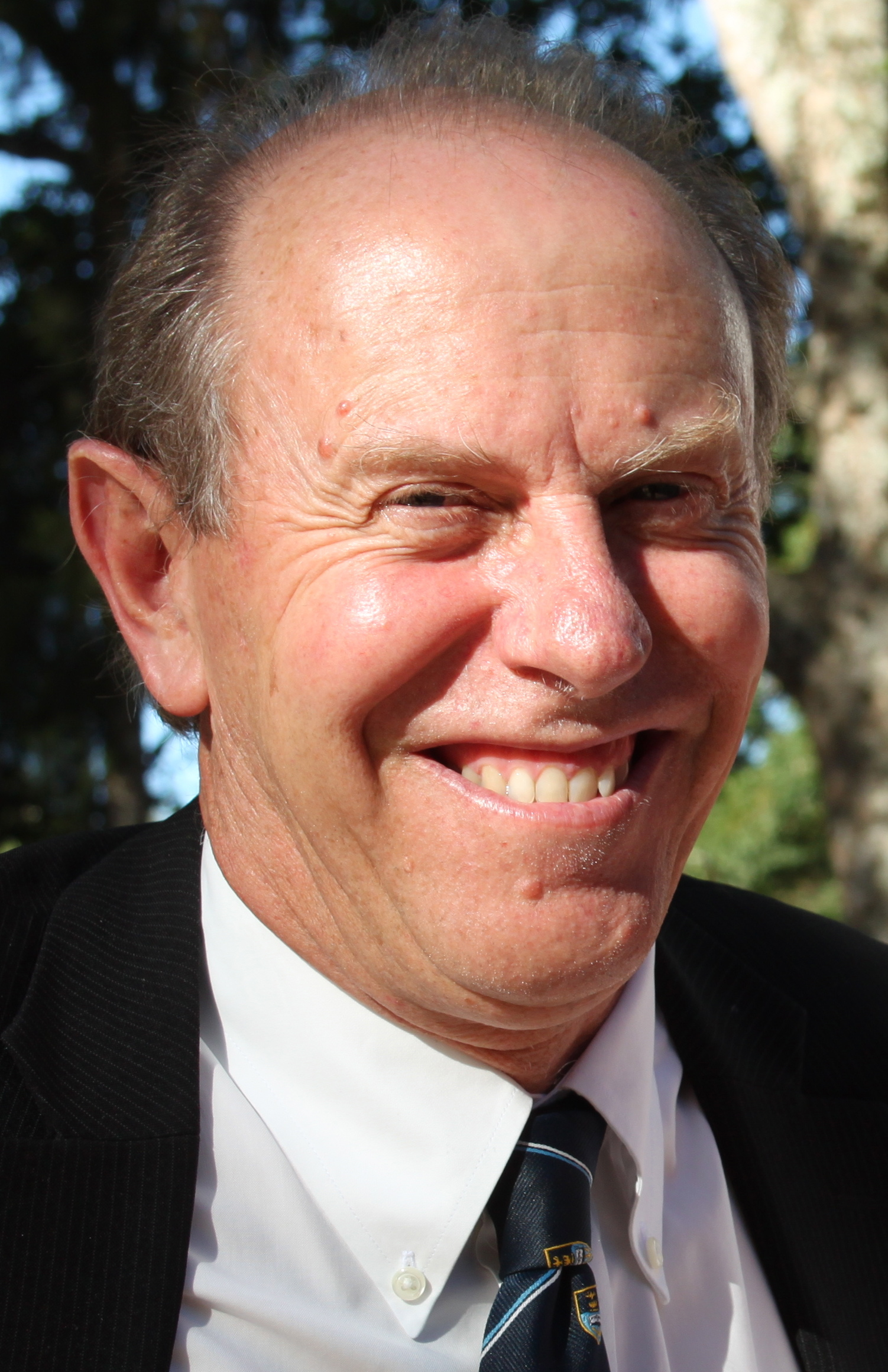
- Incumbent; David Coltart since 11 September 2023
- Style: His Worship
- Inaugural holder: Isidore Hirschler
- Formation: 25 November 1897; 128 years ago

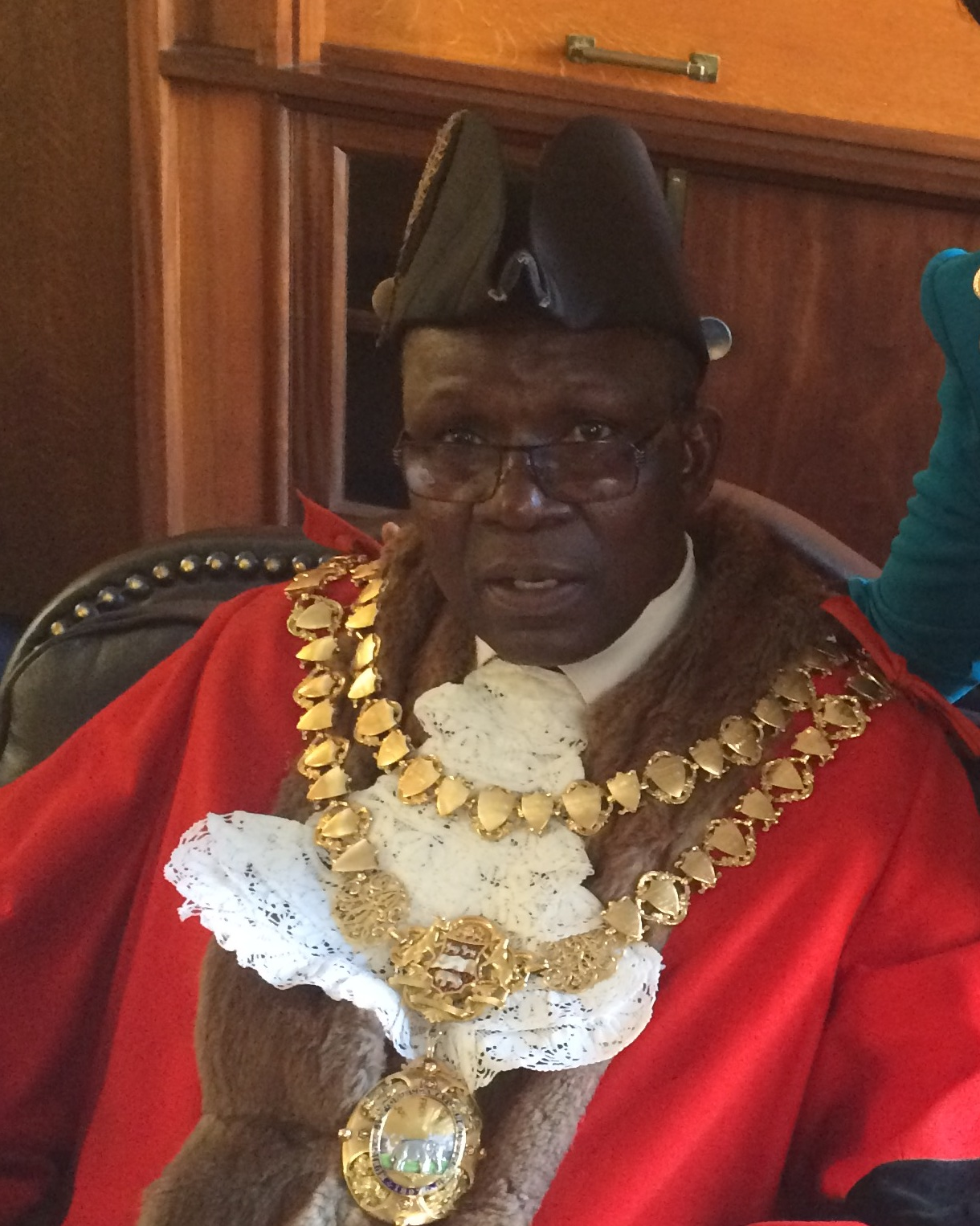
Mayor Martin Moyo wearing mayoral regalia

The Executive Mayor of Bulawayo is the executive of the government of Bulawayo, Zimbabwe. The Mayor is a member of the Bulawayo City Council, and is assisted by a deputy mayor. The Mayor uses the style "His Worship". The current mayor is David Coltart since 11 September 2023.

== History ==
Bulawayo's first mayor, Isidore Hirschler, took office on 25 November 1897. In 1981, following Zimbabwe's independence from the United Kingdom, Bulawayo's first black mayor, Naison Ndlovu, took office.

== List of mayors ==
The following is a list of past mayors of Bulawayo.

Mayor	Term start	Term end	Party	Ref
Isidore Hirschler	25 November 1897	2 August 1898		
Charles Theodore Holland	2 August 1898	1899		
Henry Frederick White	1899	1900		
William H. Haddon	27 September 1900	1901		
John Kerr	1901	1902		
J. E. Scott	1902	1904		
Walter Baxendale	1904	1906		
E. F. Philip	1906	1907		
Emanuel Basch	1907	1911		
Alex Fraser	1911	1912		
Walter Baxendale	1912	1913		
Alex Fraser	1913	1914		
W. B. Bucknall	1914	1915		
W. J. Atterbury	1915	1917		
George Stewart	1917	1918		
W. J. Atterbury	1918	1919		
James Cowden	1919	1923	RGA	
J. H. Bookless	1923	1924		
Henry Robert Barbour	1924	1927	Rhodesia Party	
H. B. Ellenbogen	1927	1929		
W. H. Peard	1929	1932		
William Maver	1932	1933		
Theodore Holdengarde	1933	1934	United Party	
Cessy Harris	1934	1936		
Donald MacIntyre	1936	1938	Labour Party	
Theodore Holdengarde	1938	1940	Liberal Party	
D. W. Young	1940	1942		
Edward Jonathan Davies	1942	1944	Labour Party	
Donald MacIntyre	1944	1947	Labour Party	
Henry Alfred Holmes	1947	1949	United Party	
J. H. Butcher	1949	1951		
C. M. Newman	1951	1953		
John Morrison MacDonald	1953	1955	Liberal Party	
John William Phillips	1955	1957		
M. M. McNellie	1957	1959		
Sydney Henderson Millar	1959	1960		
Margot Brett	1960	1961		
Jack Graham Pain	1961	1962	Dominion Party	
Sydney Henderson Millar	1962	1963	Rhodesian Front	
Aubrey M. Butcher	1963	1964		
A. C. Dold	1964	1964		
Abraham Menashe	1965	1967	Independent	
William Kinleyside	1967	1968		
Jurick Goldwasser	1968	1969		
Max Logan	1969	1970		
T. H. Doyle	1970	1971	Independent	
H. Coronel	1971	1972		
Ralph S. Harris	1972	1973		
Eugene D. Gordon	1973	1974		
Charles McKenzie Scott	1974	1975	Rhodesian Front	
Len Sexon	1975	1976		
Eric Hoyle	1976	1977		
Joanna Sharland	1977	1978		
D. J. Rowland	1978	1979		
Mike Constandinos	1979	1981		
Naison Ndlovu	1981	1983	PF–ZAPU	
Enos Mdlongwa	1983	1985	PF–ZAPU	
Nicholas Mabodoko	1985	1988	PF–ZAPU	
J. M. Ndlovu	1988	1989	ZANU–PF	
A. L. Ncube	1989	1990	ZANU–PF	
Dennis Ndlovu	1990	1991	ZANU–PF	
Nelson Sidanile	1991	1992	ZANU–PF	
Israel Gadhlula	1992	1993	ZANU–PF	
Joshua Malinga	1993	1995	ZANU–PF	
Abel Siwela	1996	2000	ZANU–PF	
Japhet Ndabeni Ncube	2001	2008	MDC (before 2005)	
Japhet Ndabeni Ncube	2001	2008	MDC–M (after 2005)	
Patrick Thaba-Moyo	2008	2013	MDC–T	
Martin Moyo	2013	2018	MDC–T	
Solomon Mguni	7 September 2018	2023	MDC Alliance	
David Coltart	11 September 2023		CCC	
