= Naison Ndlovu =

Zimbabwean politician (1930–2017)

Naison Khutshwekhaya Ndlovu

Deputy president of the Senate of Zimbabwe
- In office 2005–2013

Mayor of Bulawayo
- In office 1981–1983

Personal details
- Born: 22 October 1930
- Died: 29 May 2017 (aged 86)
- Party: PF-ZAPU, ZANU-PF

Naison Khutshwekhaya Ndlovu (22 October 1930 – 28 May 2017) was a Zimbabwean politician and deputy president of the Senate of Zimbabwe.

== Political career ==
Ndlovu was a veteran member of PF-ZAPU, serving as ZAPU representative at the Lancaster House talks, and then of ZANU-PF following the unification of the two parties. He was the first mayor of Bulawayo, the second largest city in the country, to be elected after Zimbabwe's independence, a post he held until 1985.

Ndlovu served as the ZAPU (and subsequently ZANU-PF) member of parliament for Insiza from 1985 until he lost the seat to the MDC in 2000. He was elected senator for Insiza in 2005 and returned to the senate under the proportional representation system in 2013, representing ZANU-PF in Matabeleland South.

From 2003 to his death in 2017, he was on the United States sanctions list as well as the European Union sanctions list.
