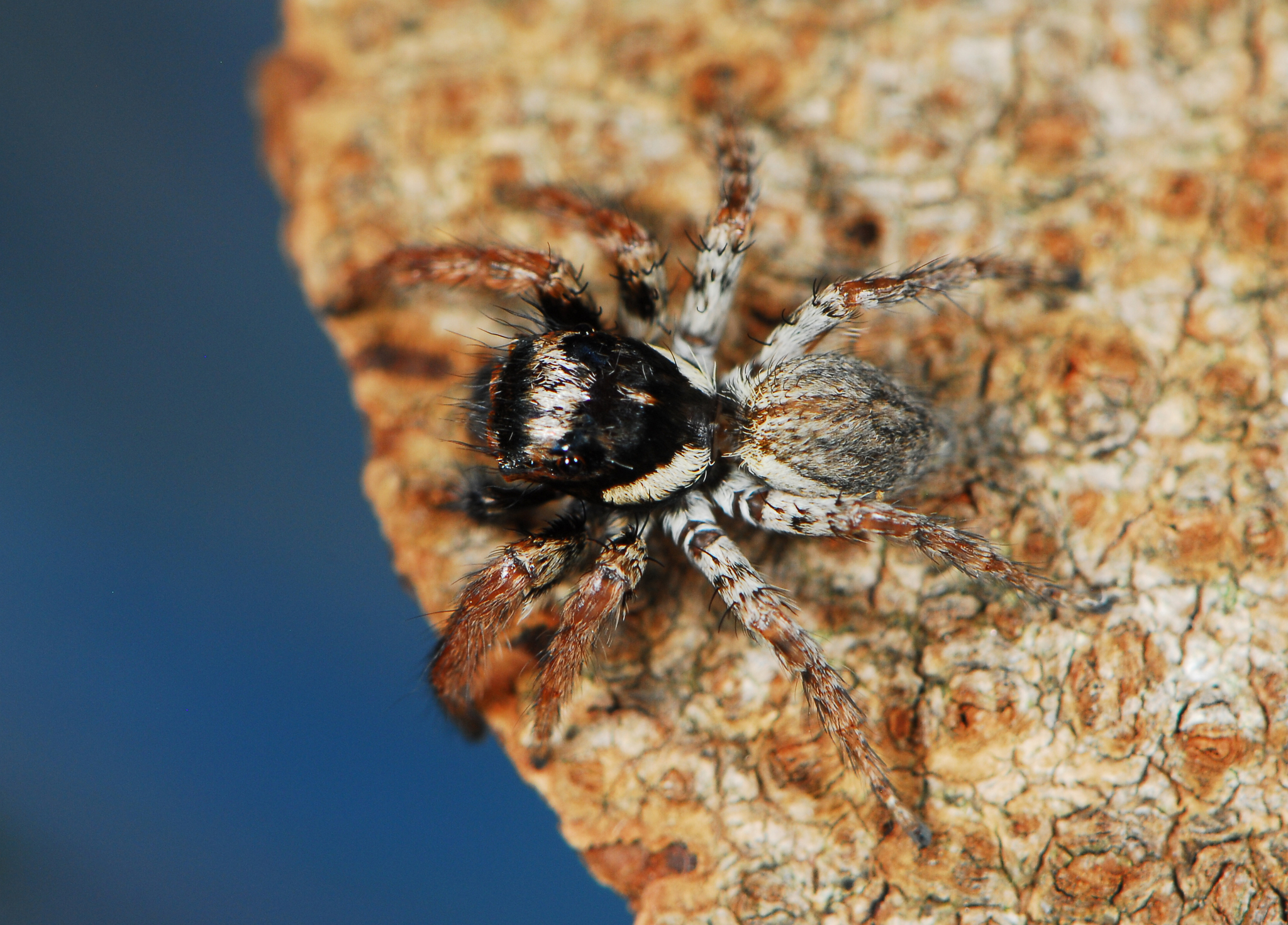

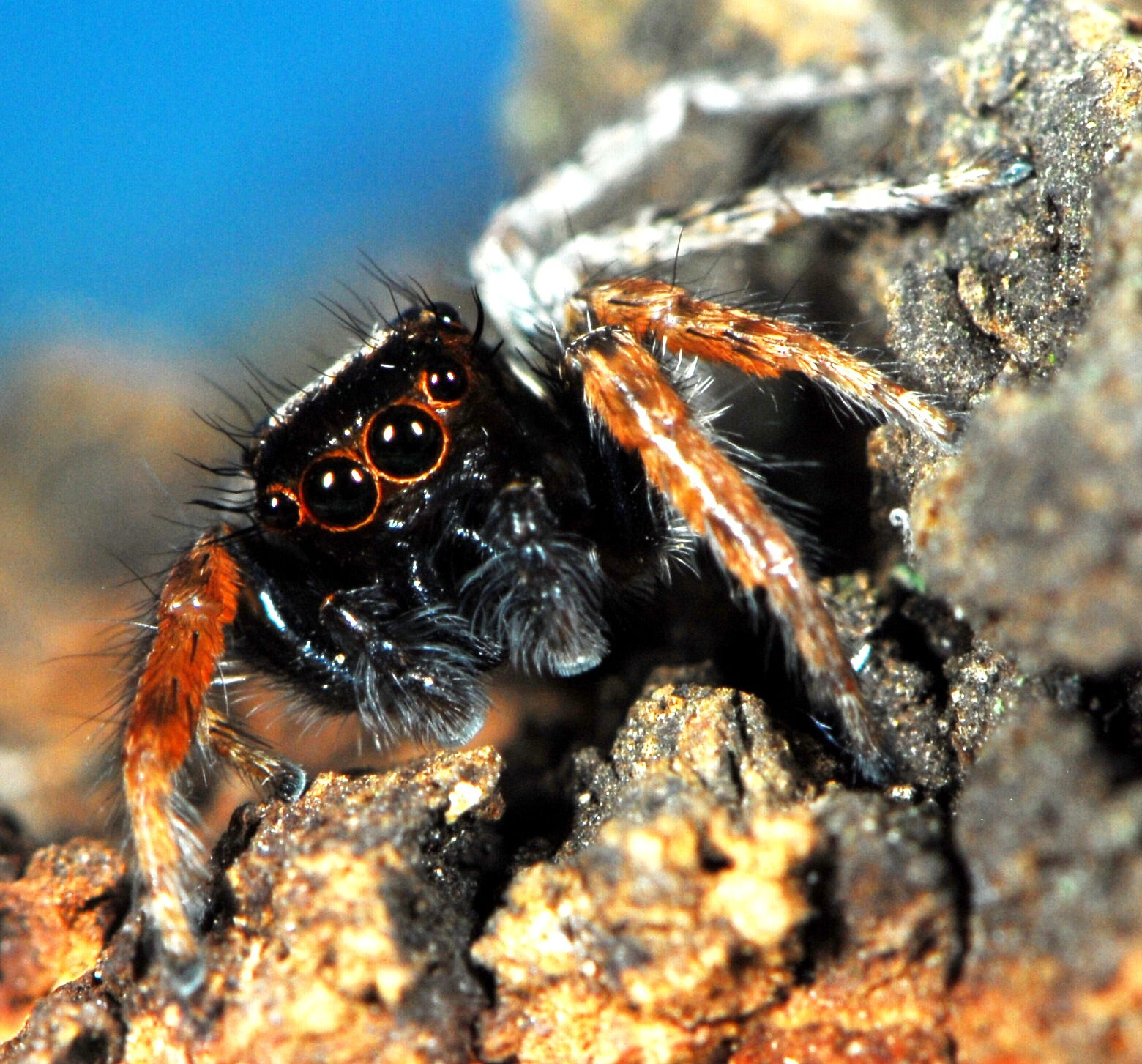

Scientific classification
- Kingdom: Animalia
- Phylum: Arthropoda
- Subphylum: Chelicerata
- Class: Arachnida
- Order: Araneae
- Infraorder: Araneomorphae
- Family: Salticidae
- Genus: Parajotus
- Species: P. obscurofemoratus

Binomial name
- Parajotus obscurofemoratus Peckham & Peckham, 1903

= Parajotus obscurofemoratus =

Species of spider

Parajotus obscurofemoratus is a jumping spider species in the genus Parajotus that lives in the South Africa. It is the only member of the species from the country. The male of the species was first identified by George and Elizabeth Peckham in 1903.

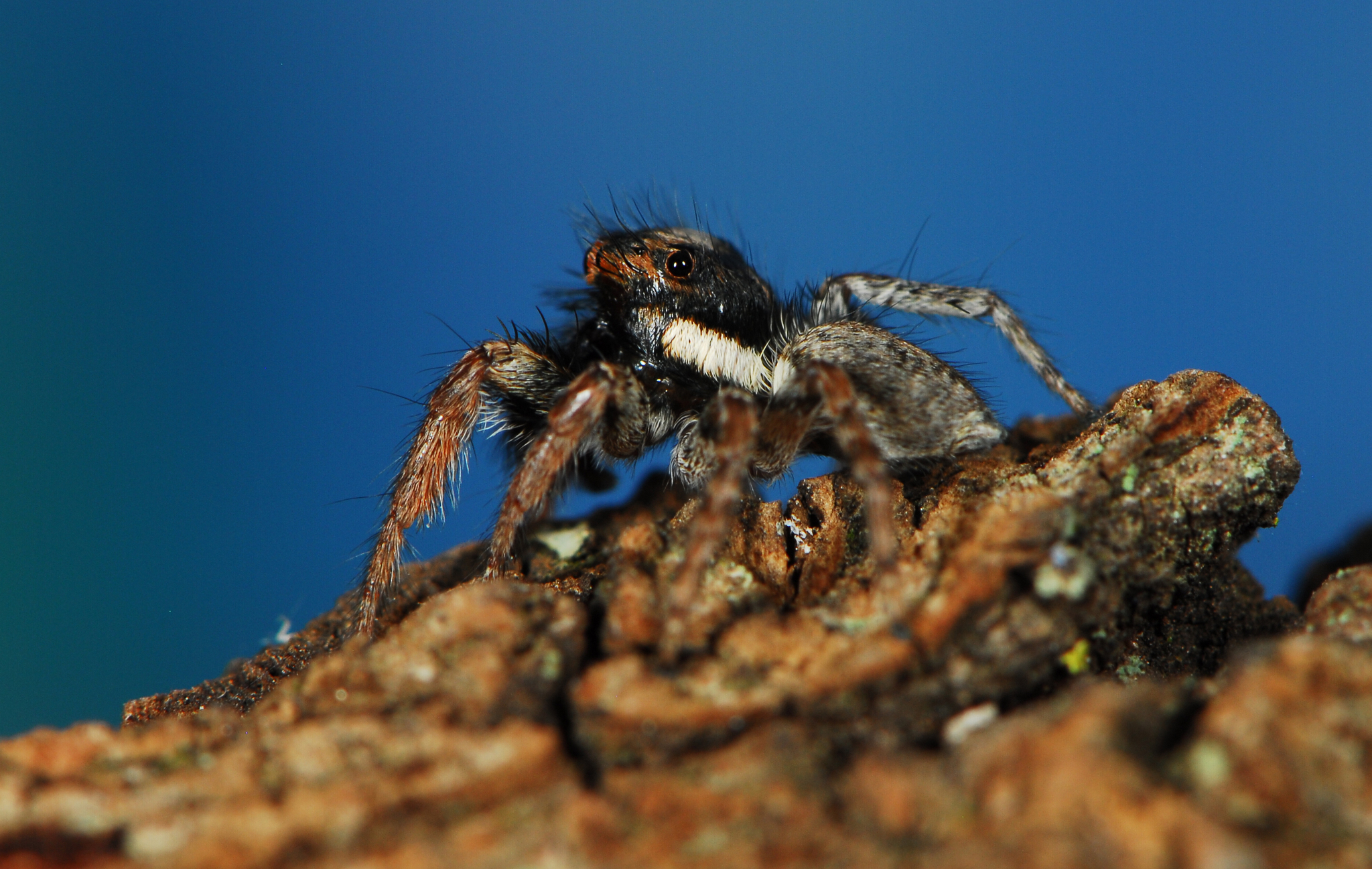

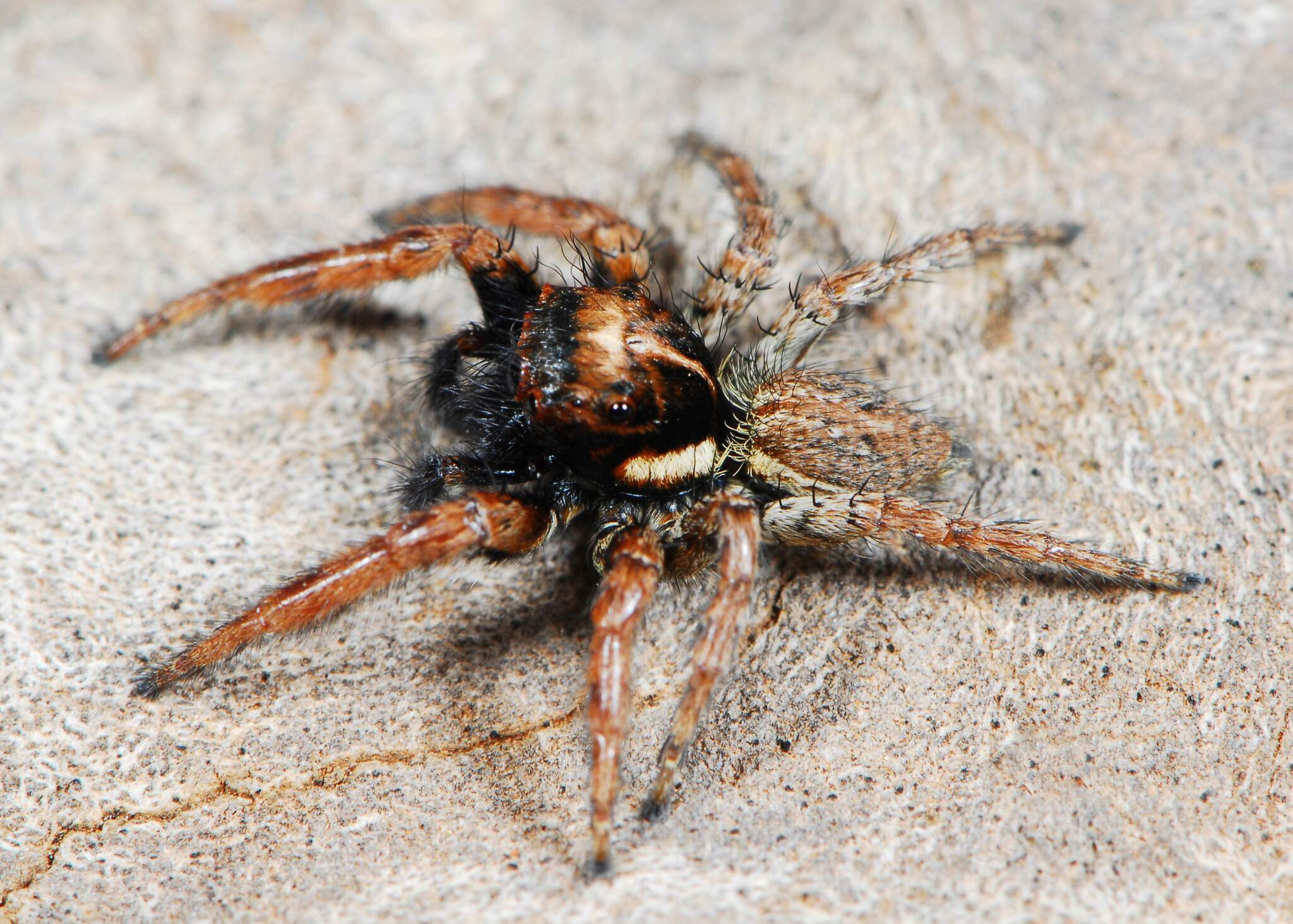

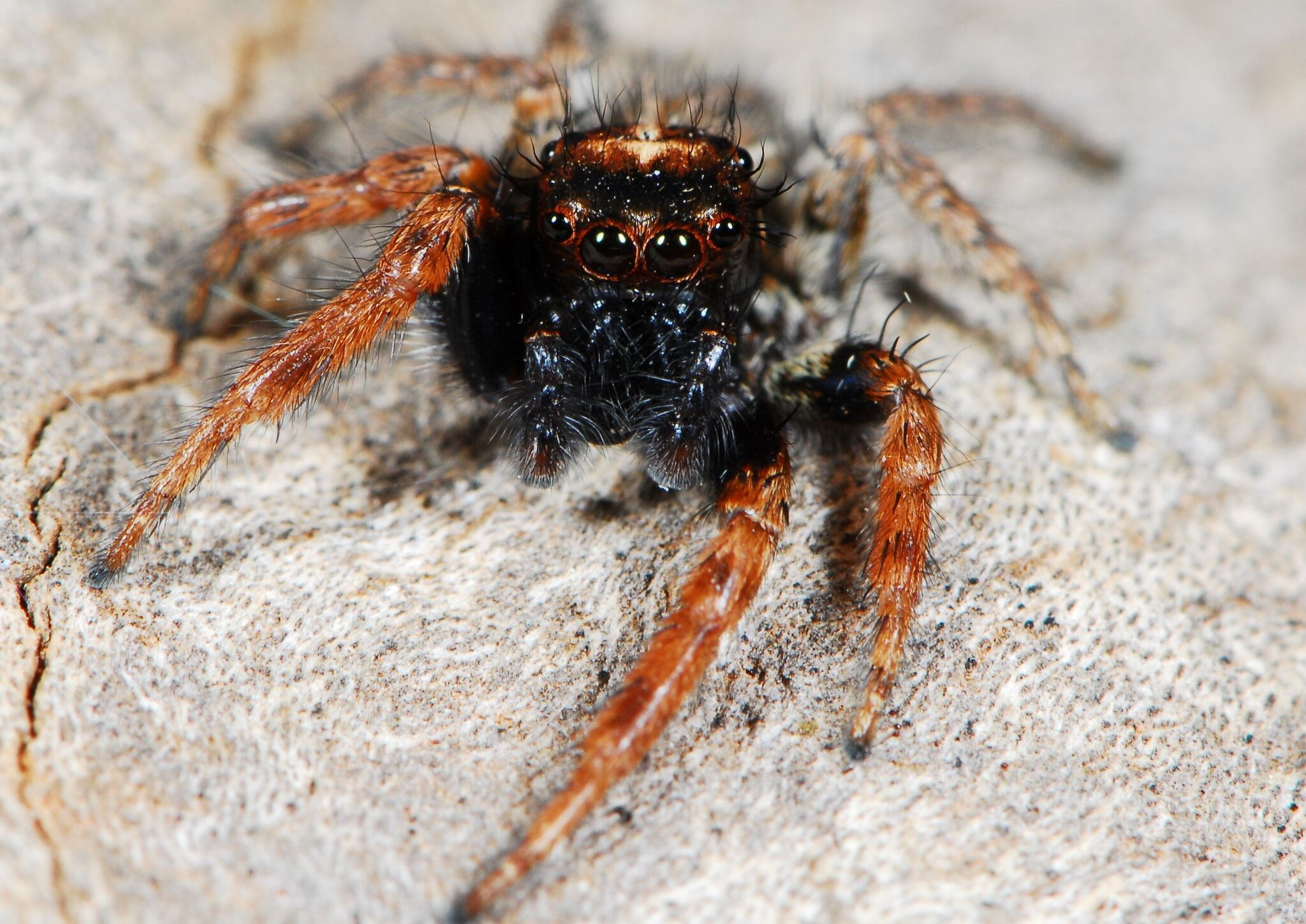
