= Butholezwe Ncube =

Zimbabwean footballer (born 1992)

Personal information
- Date of birth: 24 April 1992 (age 34)
- Place of birth: Zimbabwe
- Position: Midfielder

Team information
- Current team: AmaZulu
- Number: 6

Senior career*
Years	Team	Apps	(Gls)
2015–2016	Tsholotsho FC		
2016–2021	AmaZulu	102	(3)

International career^{‡}
2018–2021	Zimbabwe	6	(0)
- * Club domestic league appearances and goals as of 23 April 2024 ‡ National team caps and goals as of 23 April 2024

Butholezwe Ncube (born 24 April 1992) is a Zimbabwean professional footballer who played as a midfielder for South African Premier Division club AmaZulu and the Zimbabwe national team.

== Career ==
=== AmaZulu ===
Ncube joined South African club AmaZulu in 2016, making his debut for the club on the opening day of the season against Black Leopards. In September 2018, Ncube signed a three-year contract extension with the club.

=== International ===
Ncube made his senior international debut on 24 March 2018 in a 4–2 penalty defeat to Angola, following a 2–2 draw in regulation time.

== Career statistics ==
=== Club ===
As of match played 5 June 2021

Appearances and goals by club, season and competition
Club	Season	League			Cup		Other		Total	
Club	Season	Division	Apps	Goals	Apps	Goals	Apps	Goals	Apps	Goals
AmaZulu	2016–17	National First Division	25	0	0	0	—	—	25	0
AmaZulu	2017–18	South African Premier Division	21	0	3 (Note: Includes 2 appearances in the Nedbank Cup and 1 in the Telkom Knockout)	0	—	—	24	0
AmaZulu	2018–19	South African Premier Division	20	2	1 (Note: Includes appearance(s) in the Telkom Knockout)	0	—	—	21	2
AmaZulu	2019–20	South African Premier Division	20	1	1	0	—	—	21	1
AmaZulu	2020–21	South African Premier Division	16	0	1 (Note: Includes appearance(s) in the Nedbank Cup)	0	—	—	17	0
Career total			102	3	6	0	—	—	108	3

=== International ===
As of matches played 29 March 2021.

National team	Year	Apps	Goals
Zimbabwe	2018	1	0
Zimbabwe	2019	3	0
Zimbabwe	2021	2	0
Total		6	0
