= Mutare City Council =

Mutare governing authorities

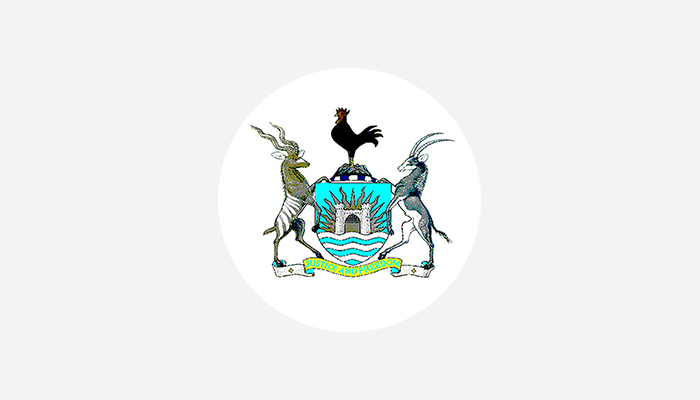

Type
- Type: City council

Leadership
- Mayor: Sophia Gwasira
- Town Cleck: Kumbirai Madanha

Structure
- Seats: 25
- Political groups: Elected (19); CCC (19): Appointed (6); Women’s Quota (6)

Elections
- Voting system: First-past-the-post
- Last election: 2023
- Next election: 2028

Meeting place
- Civic Center

Website
- Official Website

Constitution
- Mutare City Bylaws

Mutare City Council is a local governing board that oversees within Mutare City limits. It is a statutory body established in terms of Constitution Amendment 20 of 2013's Zimbabwean Constitution.

== Councilors ==
=== Elected councilors ===
Councilor	Ward	Constituency	City
John Nyamhoka	1		Mutare
Gift Kadozora	2		Mutare
Tichaenzana Maita	3		Mutare
Edison Kalulu	4		Mutare
Simon Mapuvire	5		Mutare
Sekai Mukodza	6		Mutare
Daniel Saunyama	7		Mutare
Sophia Gwasira	8		Mutare
Blessing Murindashaka	9		Mutare
Calvin Matsiya	10		Mutare
Simon Chabuka	11		Mutare
Cloud Nengomasha	12		Mutare
Takesure Musorowenzou	13		Mutare
Patrick Masenyama	14		Mutare
Itayi Chisoni	15		Mutare
Gift Chatikobo	16		Mutare
Jeffrey Nyamana	17		Mutare
James Mugorosa	18		Mutare
Zvichauuya Mukombero	19		Mutare

Under the Women's Quota:

- Miriam Tandire
- Lilian Chipiro
- Tapiwa Manyarara
- Sarah Manjengwa
- Victoria Chimonyo
- Charity Chirara
