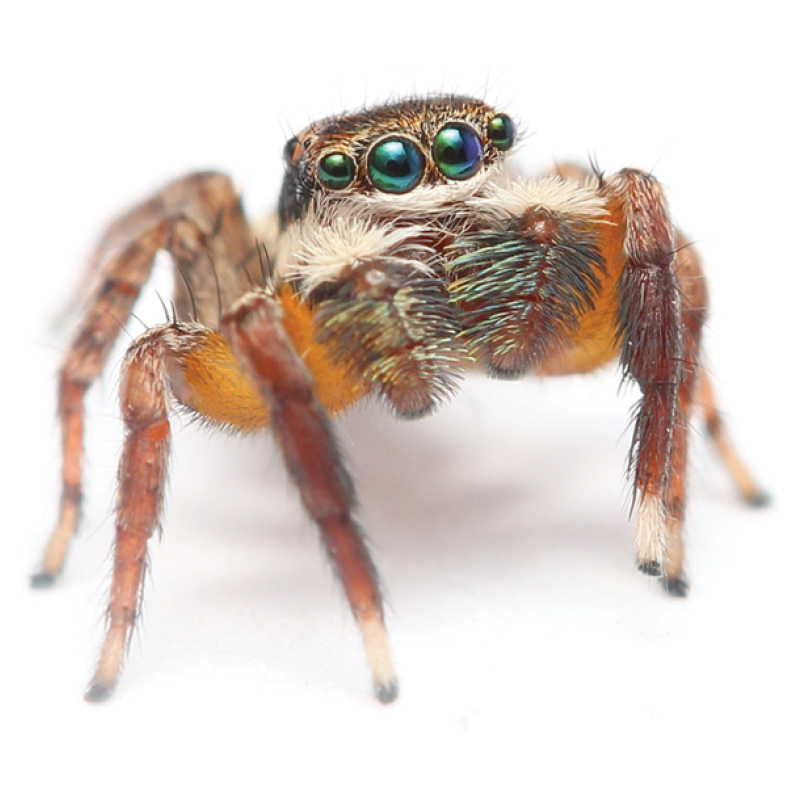
- Jotus auripes

Scientific classification
- Kingdom: Animalia
- Phylum: Arthropoda
- Subphylum: Chelicerata
- Class: Arachnida
- Order: Araneae
- Infraorder: Araneomorphae
- Family: Salticidae
- Subfamily: Salticinae
- Genus: Jotus; L. Koch, 1881

Type species
- Jotus auripes L. Koch, 1881

Species
- See text

= Jotus =

Genus of spiders

Jotus is a spider genus of the family Salticidae (jumping spiders), native to Australia, New Zealand, and Indonesia. Many as yet undescribed species are thought to exist in southern Australia.

== Species ==
As of December 2020, the World Spider Catalog accepted these species:

- Jotus albimanus Baehr, Schubert & Harms, 2019 – Australia (New South Wales)
- Jotus auripes L. Koch, 1881 (type species) – Australia (New South Wales, Victoria)
- Jotus braccatus L. Koch, 1881 – Australia (Queensland)
- Jotus debilis L. Koch, 1881 – Australia (New South Wales)
- Jotus fortiniae Baehr, Schubert & Harms, 2019 – Australia (Queensland)
- Jotus frosti Peckham & Peckham, 1901 – Australia (Victoria, South Australia)
- Jotus insulanus Rainbow, 1920 – Australia (Lord Howe Island)
- Jotus karllagerfeldi Baehr, Schubert & Harms, 2019 – Australia (Queensland)
- Jotus maculivertex Strand, 1911 – Indonesia (Kei Islands)
- Jotus minutus L. Koch, 1881 – Australia (Queensland)
- Jotus moonensis Baehr, Schubert & Harms, 2019 – Australia (Queensland)
- Jotus newtoni Baehr, Schubert & Harms, 2019 – Australia (Queensland)
- Jotus ravus (Urquhart, 1893) – New Zealand
- Jotus remus Otto & Hill, 2016 – Australia (New South Wales)
