= Prime Minister of the Federation of Rhodesia and Nyasaland =

Head of government of the Federation of Rhodesia and Nyasaland

- Coat of arms of the Federation

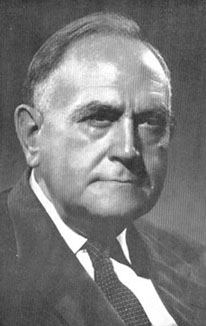
- Last in office Roy Welensky; 2 November 1956 – 31 December 1963
- Style: The Right Honourable
- Residence: Salisbury, Southern Rhodesia (now Harare, Zimbabwe)
- Appointer: Governor-General of the Federation of Rhodesia and Nyasaland
- Formation: 7 September 1953
- First holder: Godfrey Huggins
- Final holder: Roy Welensky
- Abolished: 31 December 1963

The prime minister of the Federation of Rhodesia and Nyasaland (also known as the Central African Federation) served as the country's head of government. The federation was formed on 1 August 1953 from the former colonies of Southern Rhodesia, Northern Rhodesia and Nyasaland, and was formally dissolved on 31 December 1963.

== List of prime ministers of the Federation of Rhodesia and Nyasaland ==
Parties

United Rhodesia Party / United Federal Party (Note: Merged in 1957 with the Federal Party to become the United Federal Party.)

No.	Portrait	Name (Birth–Death) Constituency	Term of office			Elected (Parliament)	Political party
No.	Portrait	Name (Birth–Death) Constituency	Took office	Left office	Time in office	Elected (Parliament)	Political party
1		Godfrey Huggins (1883–1971); MP for Salisbury North	7 September 1953	2 November 1956	3 years, 56 days	1953 (1st)	United Rhodesia Party
1		Godfrey Huggins (1883–1971); MP for Salisbury North	First Prime Minister of the Federation of Rhodesia and Nyasaland. Served as Prime Minister of Southern Rhodesia for 20 years before becoming Prime Minister of the Federation. Huggins became an advocate of federating Southern Rhodesia with some of the neighbouring British colonies in the region so that they would become an independent state within the British Empire while maintaining white minority rule with only a small number of educated blacks qualifying for the vote in addition to most whites. As a result of his effort the Federation of Rhodesia and Nyasaland was created in 1953 uniting Northern Rhodesia, Southern Rhodesia and Nyasaland with Huggins as the federation's first Prime Minister. Huggins remained in office until 1956 and was elevated to the British peerage as Viscount Malvern on 17 February 1955, prior to his retirement.				
2		Roy Welensky (1907–1991); MP for Broken Hill	2 November 1956	31 December 1963	7 years, 59 days	— (1st); 1958 (2nd); 1962 (3rd)	United Federal Party
2		Roy Welensky (1907–1991); MP for Broken Hill	During his tenure as Prime Minister of the Federation, Welensky opposed British moves towards Black majority rule, and used force to suppress politically motivated violence in the territories. In foreign policy, his government supported the United Kingdom during the Suez Crisis and got involved in the Congo Crisis, accepting white refugees and supporting the State of Katanga and its leader Moïse Tshombe. After the advent of black majority rule in two of the Federation's three territories under 'one man, one vote' constitutions (Northern Rhodesia and Nyasaland, now Zambia and Malawi respectively), the Federation was dissolved in late 1963.				

== See also ==
- Governor-General of the Federation of Rhodesia and Nyasaland

== Sources ==
- Bidwell, Robin Leonard (1974). The British Empire and Successor States, 1900–1972. London: Frank Cass. p. 153. ISBN 0-7146-3017-9.
