= Governor-General of the Federation of Rhodesia and Nyasaland =

Representative of the monarch

- Coat of arms of the Federation

- Flag of the governor-general
- Style: His Excellency The Right Honourable
- Residence: Government House, Salisbury (now Harare)
- Appointer: Monarch of the United Kingdom
- Formation: 4 September 1953
- First holder: John Llewellin, 1st Baron Llewellin
- Final holder: Sir Humphrey Gibbs (Acting)
- Abolished: 31 December 1963

The governor-general of the Federation of Rhodesia and Nyasaland (also known as the Central African Federation) served as the representative of the British monarch in the country. The federation was formed on 1 August 1953 from the former colonies of Southern Rhodesia, Northern Rhodesia and Nyasaland, and was formally dissolved on 31 December 1963.

As Salisbury (now Harare) became the capital of the Federation as well as Southern Rhodesia, Government House, previously used as the residence of the Governor of Southern Rhodesia, became the residence of the Governor-General of the Federation. During this time, the Governor of Southern Rhodesia resided in Governor's Lodge in the suburb of Highlands.

== List of governors-general of the Federation of Rhodesia and Nyasaland ==
No.	Portrait	Name (Birth–Death)	Term of office			Monarch
No.	Portrait	Name (Birth–Death)	Took office	Left office	Time in office	Monarch
1		John Llewellin, 1st Baron Llewellin (1893–1957)	4 September 1953	24 January 1957†	3 years, 142 days	Elizabeth II
–		Sir Robert Tredgold (1899–1977); Acting	24 January 1957	February 1957	8 days	Elizabeth II
–		Sir William Lindsay Murphy (1888–1965); Acting	February 1957	8 October 1957	249 days	Elizabeth II
2		Simon Ramsay, 16th Earl of Dalhousie (1914–1999)	8 October 1957	May 1963	5 years, 205 days	Elizabeth II
–		Sir Humphrey Gibbs (1902–1990); Acting (Note: Simultaneously served as the Governor of Southern Rhodesia.)	May 1963	31 December 1963	244 days	Elizabeth II

== See also ==
- Prime Minister of the Federation of Rhodesia and Nyasaland
- Governor of Southern Rhodesia
- Governor of Northern Rhodesia
- List of colonial governors of Nyasaland

== Sources ==
- Bidwell, Robin Leonard (1974). The British Empire and Successor States, 1900–1972. London: Frank Cass. p. 153. ISBN 0-7146-3017-9.
