= Flag of Rhodesia =

Rhodesia
- 'The green and white'
- Use: National flag and ensign
- Proportion: 1:2
- Adopted: 11 November 1968
- Relinquished: 2 September 1979
- Design: A vertical bicolour triband of green, white and green with the coat of arms of Rhodesia in the centre of the white panel.
- Designed by: Geoffrey Turner-Dauncey
- Presidential flag of Rhodesia
- Use: Presidential flag
- Proportion: 1:2
- Adopted: 2 March 1970
- Design: A sky blue field with the coat of arms of Rhodesia in the centre.
- Flag of the prime minister of Rhodesia
- Use: Flag of the prime minister
- Adopted: 1970
- Design: A dark green triangular pennant with the coat of arms of Rhodesia on the wider near-side of the flag.

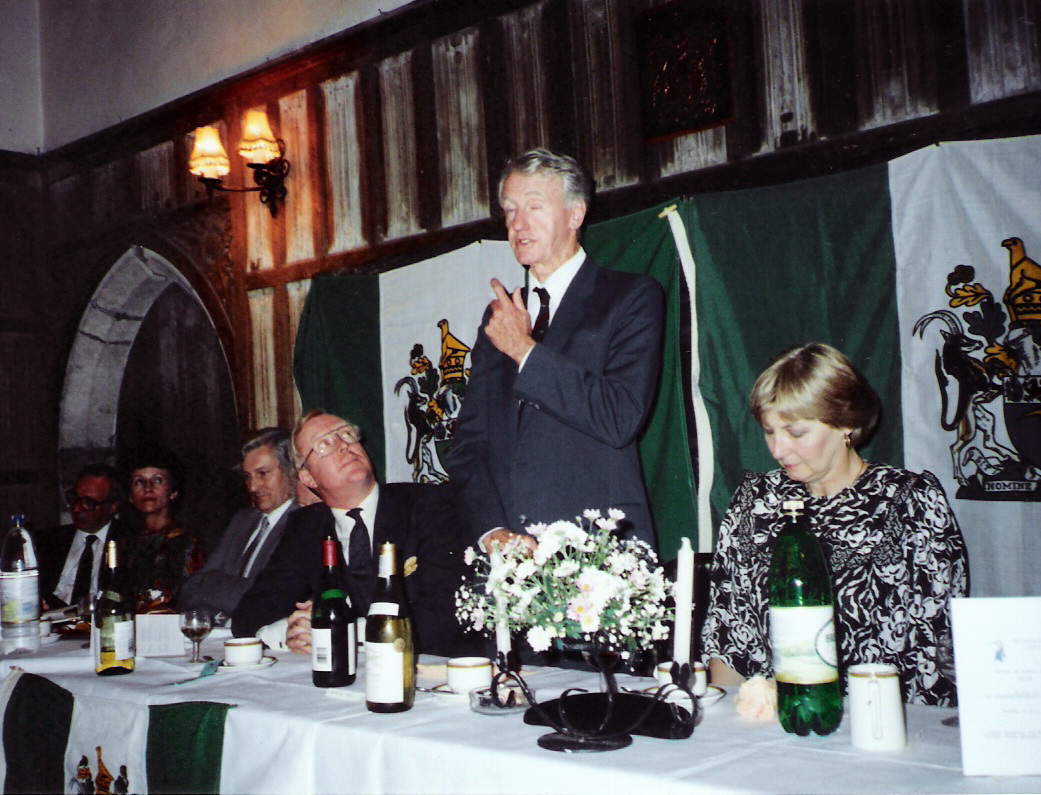
Ian Smith speaking at a dinner in England, with Rhodesian flags behind him.

The flag of Rhodesia (modern-day Zimbabwe) changed with political developments in the country. At independence in 1965, the recently adopted sky blue flag of Southern Rhodesia was used, until a new flag (the green and white triband) was adopted in 1968. The 1968 flag remained in use following the declaration of the republic in 1970 and thus is associated with the end of the crown in Rhodesia. It was also initially the flag of Zimbabwe Rhodesia until a new flag was adopted in September 1979.

== History ==
Flag of Rhodesia (1964–1968)

Between the late 1920s and 1953, the then Colony of Southern Rhodesia followed British colonial practice, by using a Blue Ensign with the Union Flag in the canton and the shield from the colony's coat of arms in the fly.

In 1953, Southern Rhodesia federated with Northern Rhodesia and Nyasaland to form the Federation of Rhodesia and Nyasaland. The federal flag was used between September 1953 until 31 December 1963 when the federation was dissolved. Less than a year after the break-up of the Federation, Northern Rhodesia and Nyasaland became the independent states of Zambia and Malawi respectively. Southern Rhodesia became known simply as Rhodesia, although its legal name remained the Colony of Southern Rhodesia. In April 1964 Rhodesia adopted a light Royal Air Force blue ensign with the shield from the coat of arms of Rhodesia in the fly. This was the first time the lighter shade of blue ensign was used by a British colony, although Fiji and Tuvalu both subsequently adopted national flags based on the light blue ensign.

Following the Unilateral Declaration of Independence (UDI) on 11 November 1965, the flag was retained, but three years later on the anniversary of UDI it was replaced by a green and white flag (similar to that of Nigeria) with the full coat of arms in the centre. On 2 March 1970, the country declared itself a republic but there was no change to the flag.

Prior to its closure, the Rhodesian mission in London flew the newly adopted flag in a provocative gesture, as the Commonwealth Prime Ministers arrived for their Conference. This was considered illegal by the Foreign Office, and prompted calls by Labour MP Willie Hamilton, who condemned it as "the flag of an illegal Government in rebellion against the Crown", for its removal.

Throughout this time, the UK refused to recognise Rhodesia's independence and maintained that the dark-blue ensign remained the official flag of the country, but in 1972, the Rhodesian Olympic team raised the earlier pre-1953 dark Blue Ensign at the Olympic Village in Munich, while "God Save The Queen" was played. This was before its expulsion from the International Olympic Committee, four days before the opening of the 1972 Summer Olympics.

In 1979, the country became known as Zimbabwe-Rhodesia and a new flag was adopted on 4 September that year featuring the pan-African colours of red, black, yellow and green, and the Zimbabwe Bird. However, under the terms of the Lancaster House Agreement, the country briefly returned to British rule under the Union Jack from 12 December 1979 although the Zimbabwe Rhodesia flag remained de facto in use. Thus it was the British Union Flag that was lowered during the ceremony on 17/18 April 1980 marking the country's attainment of independence as the Republic of Zimbabwe when the new flag of Zimbabwe was adopted.

== Official description ==
The following was published as a supplement to the Government Gazette issued on Friday 9 August 1968.

1968 Flag of Rhodesia No. 40 / p. 285
Rhodesia Act
To provide for the adoption of a national flag for Rhodesia; to provide for the making of regulations to restrict or control the application to any goods of a reproduction of such flag; to amend section 16 of the Merchandise Marks Act, 1957, and to provide for matters incidental to the foregoing.
BE IT ENACTED by His Excellency the Officer Administering Government as representative of the Queen's Most Excellent Majesty, by and with the advice and consent of the Parliament of Rhodesia, as follows: -
1. This Act may be cited as the Flag of Rhodesia Act, 1968.
2. The Flag of Rhodesia shall be a flag consisting of three vertical stripes of equal width, green, white and green, on which there appears in the centre of the white stripe the coat of arms of Rhodesia, with -
(a) the length of the flag equal to twice the width of the flag; and
(b) the coat of arms of Rhodesia equal in height to three-fifths of the heights of the flag.
3. The Minister of Justice shall cause a copy of the Flag of Rhodesia to be prepared and deposited in the National Archives of Rhodesia established in terms of the National Archives Act, 1963 (No. 76 of 1963).
4. (1) Where, in the opinion of the Officer Administering the Government, it is necessary to regulate and control the use of the Flag of Rhodesia in order that it is not used for purposes which, in his opinion, are improper he may make such regulations restricting, regulating or controlling the application to any goods or the importation into Rhodesia of any goods to which there has been applied a reproduction of the Flag of Rhodesia or of a flag which resembles or is intended to resemble the Flag of Rhodesia as he may consider to be necessary or expedient for the purpose.
(2) Regulations made in terms of subsection (1) may provide for penalties for any contravention thereof, including provision for the forfeiture of any goods to which a reproduction of the Flag of Rhodesia or of a flag which resembles or is intended to resemble the Flag of Rhodesia has been applied or which have been imported in contravention of such regulations: Provided that no such penalty shall exceed a fine of five hundred pounds or imprisonment for period of two years, excluding the value of any goods forfeited.
5. Any person who burns, mutilates or otherwise insults the Flag of Rhodesia or a flag which resembles or is intended to resemble the Flag of Rhodesia or any reproduction thereof in circumstances which are calculated or likely to show disrespect for the Flag of Rhodesia or to bring the Flag of Rhodesia into disrepute shall be guilty of an offence and liable to a fine not exceeding five hundred pounds or to imprisonment for a period not exceeding two years.
6. Section 16 of the Merchandise Marks Act, 1957 is amended, in subsection (1), by repeal of subparagraph (iii) of paragraph (b).
[[Coloured sheet]]

== Flag of the governor of Southern Rhodesia ==
The first flag of the governor of Southern Rhodesia

The first flag used by the governor of Southern Rhodesia followed the usual pattern for representatives of the British Crown. It consisted of a defaced Union Flag (Union Jack) with a white disc in the center of the flag. Within the centre of the disc was the shield from the Southern Rhodesian Coat of Arms.

In common with most other British colonies, the flag used by the governor, as the Sovereign's representative in Southern Rhodesia, initially flew a Union Flag with a white roundel in the centre, charged with the shield from the colony's arms granted on 11 August 1924. Unique among the flags of the governors of British Colonies, this shield of Arms was not surrounded by the customary wreath presumably because Southern Rhodesia was not a full dominion. Southern Rhodesia became a British Colony on 12 September 1923. This flag was put into use on 1 October 1924 and was flown until 30 July 1951.

On 31 July 1951, a new flag was put into use for the governor of Southern Rhodesia. This was dark blue and charged in the centre with a Royal Crown, its height being four-sevenths of the hoist. Initially the Tudor Crown would have been used, but after her accession to the throne in 1952, Queen Elizabeth II indicated her preference for the St Edward's Crown and this version would have been used thereafter. Although the colony had attained 'Responsible Government' in 1923, it was never a fully fledged Dominion, and so did not have a Governor-General, whose flag in other Dominions would be dark blue, charged in the centre with the Royal Crest above a Crown, with the name of the Dominion written in a yellow scroll below.

== Flag of Zimbabwe Rhodesia ==
Zimbabwe Rhodesia
- Use: National flag and ensign
- Proportion: 1:2
- Adopted: 2 September 1979
- Relinquished: 12 December 1979
- Design: A horizontal tricolour of red, white, and green with a black vertical stripe, fimbriated in white at the hoist, defaced with a representation of the Zimbabwe Bird in the canton in yellow.
- Designed by: Cedric Herbert
- Adopted: 1 June 1979
- Relinquished: 1 September 1979

When Rhodesia became Zimbabwe Rhodesia in 1979, a new flag was adopted with more African elements on 2 September of that year. This flag was, however, short-lived, as the self-declared state soon reverted to British rule before gaining independence as Zimbabwe in 1980.

The black symbolised the importance of majority rule, the white the role of whites in the country. The red stripe symbolised the struggle for independence, while the green represented the land and agriculture. The yellow of the Zimbabwe bird represented the country's mineral wealth. Many of these colours, and associated symbolism, were adopted in the flag of Zimbabwe in 1980.

== 21st century ==
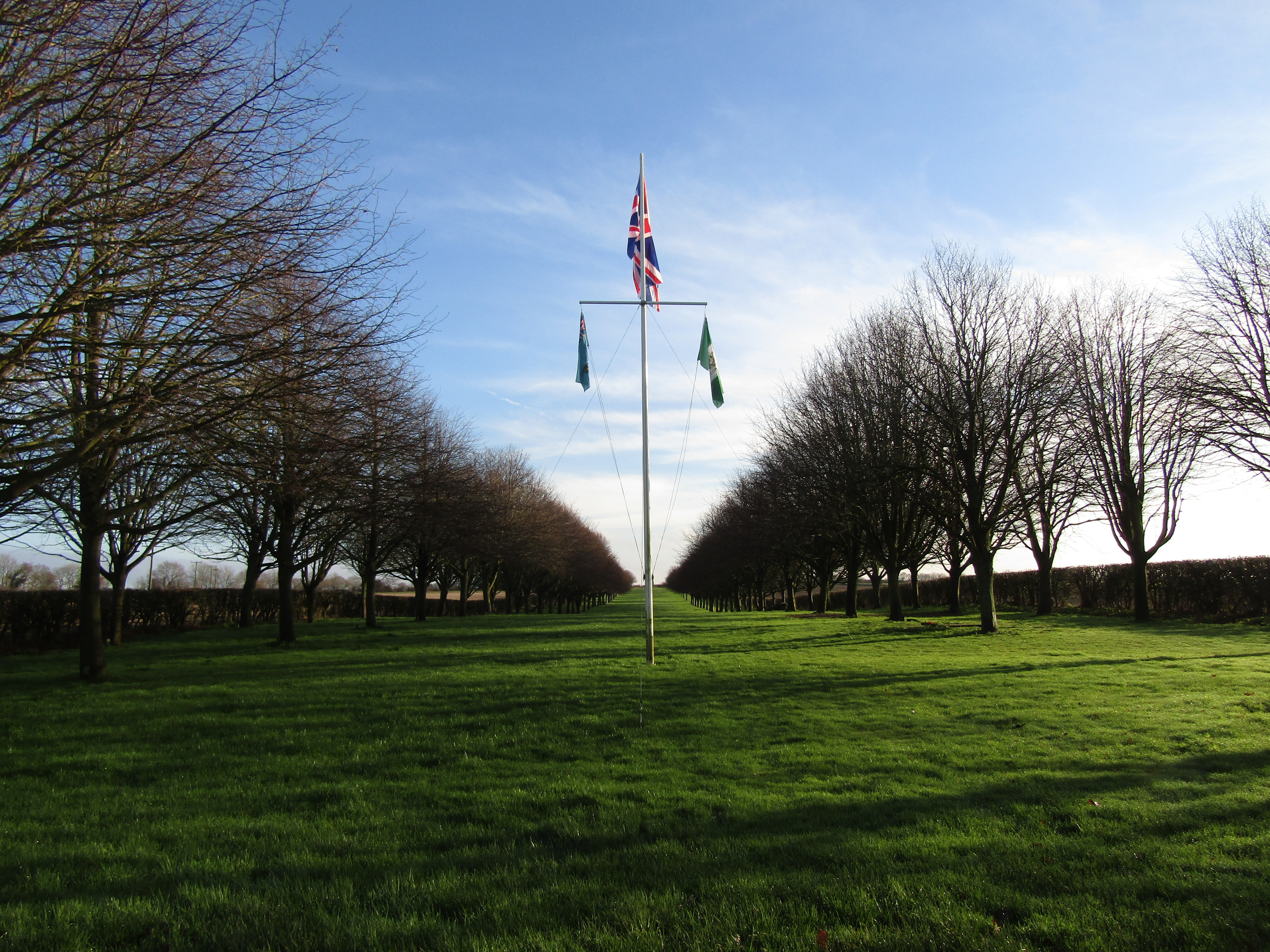
Rhodesian flags on the "Southern Rhodesia memorial avenue", Southrepps, England; established in 1990 by Peter Sladden, it has sparked controversy in recent years.

The Rhodesian flag has been used since the 2010s by various racist, alt-right, and white supremacist groups. Dylann Roof posted a manifesto onto a website named "The Last Rhodesian", before carrying out the mass murder of nine African Americans in the 2015 Charleston church shooting; he also wore a jacket with a Rhodesian flag patch on it, as well as the flag of apartheid South Africa. According to a Vox article, Roof and others see Rhodesia as "proof that countries are better off when white people run them. […] The lesson of Rhodesia, for white supremacists, is that black people are a threat to a healthy white-run society. And they need to be kept down."

In an article for The New York Times, writer John Ismay noted that the flag's popularity among the alt-right stems from its lack of recognizability compared to other white supremacist symbols. Ismay stated that "If such symbols and slogans, for a North American audience, lack the instant shock effect of a Confederate or Nazi flag, that is part of the point," noting how alt-right online storefront Commissar Clothing describes Rhodesian imagery as "inside jokes and references that the general public will not understand." Other commenters note that most Rhodesian exile groups reject these fringe uses.

In August 2026, French Army soldiers stationed in Nimes and The United Arab Emirates were subject to disciplinary proceedings for posing with the flag.

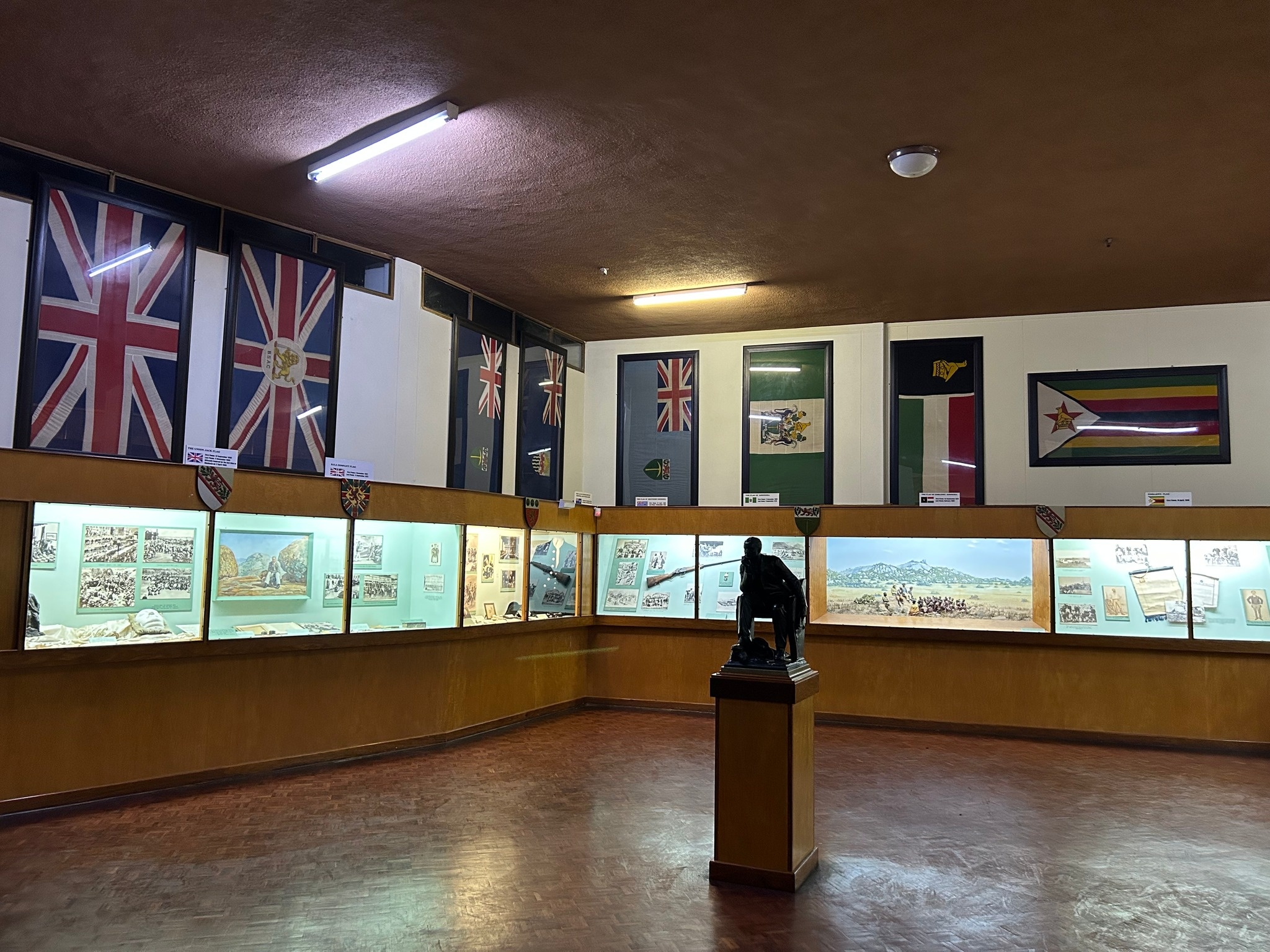
The Rhodesian flag and other historical flags behind a statue of Cecil Rhodes in the Natural History Museum of Zimbabwe, Bulawayo

== Gallery ==
Flag of the governor of Southern Rhodesia (1951–1952)

Flag of the governor of Southern Rhodesia (1952–1970)

Household flag of the governor of Southern Rhodesia (1940–1952)

Government House car flag for distinguished visitors of the governor of Southern Rhodesia (1952–1963)

Flag of the president of Rhodesia (1970–1979)

Car pennant of the prime minister of Rhodesia (1970–1979)

Car flag of the prime minister of Zimbabwe Rhodesia (1979)

Royal Rhodesia Air Force ensign (1953–1963)

Royal Rhodesia Air Force ensign (1964–1970)

Rhodesian Air Force ensign (1970–1979)

Zimbabwe Rhodesia Air Force ensign (1979)

== See also ==
- Flag of Nigeria
- Flag of South Africa (1928–1994)
- Flag of Zimbabwe
- Governor of Southern Rhodesia
- List of Rhodesian flags
