= List of Rhodesian flags =

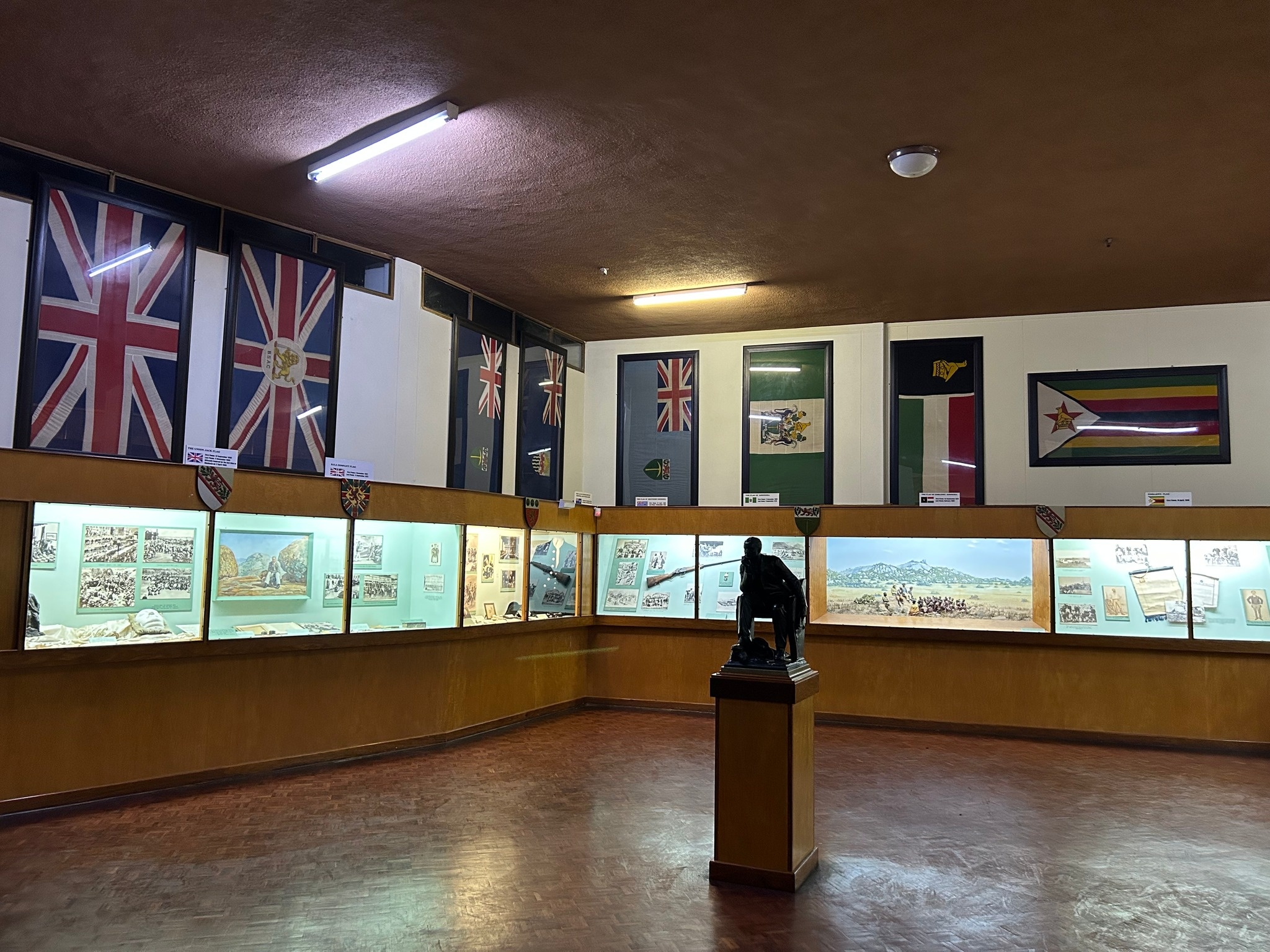
Flags at the Natural History Museum of Zimbabwe in Bulawayo

This is a list of flags used in Southern Rhodesia between 1890–1964 and 1979–1980 and Rhodesia between 1964 and 1979. The evolution of Southern Rhodesia from a British South Africa Company concern, to a British colony, then to a member of a federation, and then to a self-declared state is reflected by the different flags used.

In 1890, the Union Jack was raised at Fort Salisbury (Harare). The flag of the British South Africa Company was used from 1892. Southern Rhodesia achieved responsible government in 1923, and thereby became a British self-governing colony. Following the granting of responsible government, a flag was adopted which followed the standard British colonial practice, being a Blue Ensign, defaced with the shield from the Southern Rhodesian coat of arms. This basic design was used until 1968, although a light Blue Ensign was introduced in April 1964 following the break-up of the Federation of Rhodesia and Nyasaland. On 11 November 1968, three years after the predominantly white government unilaterally declared independence from Britain, a national flag based on a completely new design was adopted. This was a green-white-green vertical triband, charged centrally with the national coat of arms. It was the first national flag to contain the Zimbabwe Bird, which had been present in the coat of arms since 1924.

== National flags ==
Flag	Date	Use	Description
	1890–1923	Flag of the British South Africa Company	The BSAC flag was a Union Jack defaced in the centre with a white roundel containing the BSAC logo.
	1923–1964, 1979-1980	Flag of Southern Rhodesia	A defaced British Blue Ensign with the shield from the Southern Rhodesian coat of arms in the fly.
	1925–1953	Flag of Southern Rhodesia	A defaced British Blue Ensign with the shield from the Southern Rhodesian coat of arms over a white roundel in the fly.
	1953–1963	Flag of the Federation of Rhodesia and Nyasaland (also known as the Central African Federation)	A defaced British Blue Ensign with a shield from the federal arms, showing the amalgamation of Northern Rhodesia, Southern Rhodesia and Nyasaland, in the fly.
	1964–1968	Flag of Southern Rhodesia (1964–1965) and later Rhodesia (1965–1968)	A Sky-Blue British ensign with the shield from the Rhodesian coat of arms in the fly.
	1968–1979	Flag of Rhodesia	A Green-White-Green vertical tricolour with the full coat of arms of Rhodesia in the centre of the white panel.
	1979	Flag of Zimbabwe Rhodesia	A Red-White-Green horizontal tricolour with a black vertical stripe, fimbriated in white at the hoist, defaced with a centered representation of the Zimbabwe Bird in yellow.

== Vice-regal and presidential ==
Flag	Date	Use	Description
	1924–1951	Flag of the governor of Southern Rhodesia	A Union Jack defaced with the shield from coat of arms of Rhodesia in the centre.
	1951–1952	Flag of the governor of Southern Rhodesia	A Tudor Crown in the centre of a navy blue background (in official proportions of 7:9).
	1952–1965 (de jure 1952–1970)	Flag of the governor of Southern Rhodesia	A St. Edward's Crown in the centre of a navy blue background (in official proportions of 7:9).
	1952–1965 (de jure 1952–1970)	Variant flag of the governor of Southern Rhodesia	A St. Edward's Crown in the centre of a navy blue background (in manufactured proportions of 1:2).
	1940–1952	Household flag of the governor of Southern Rhodesia	A Tudor Crown in the centre of a red background. Used as a car flag within the country.
	1952–1963	Government House car flag for distinguished visitors of the governor of Southern Rhodesia	A representation of the Zimbabwe Bird in yellow in the centre of a red background. Used as a car flag within the country.
	1970–1979	Flag of the president of Rhodesia	A sky-blue flag with the full coat of arms of Rhodesia in the centre
	1970–1979	Car pennant of the prime minister of Rhodesia	A green triangular pennant the full coat of arms of Rhodesia in the centre
	1979–1980	Car flag of the prime minister of Zimbabwe Rhodesia	Based on the National Flag, a Red-White-Green horizontal tricolour in the fly with a black vertical stripe, fimbriated in white at the centre, defaced with a centered representation of the Zimbabwe Bird in yellow.

== Military flags ==
Flag	Date	Use	Description
	c. 1890–1923	British South Africa Company Blue Ensign	A defaced British Blue Ensign with the lion and tusk from the British South Africa Company arms in the fly.
	late 1970s–1980	Flag used by the Rhodesian Army (3rd version)	Orange-red-blue horizontal tricolour defaced in the centre with the Rhodesian Army emblem.
	1953–1963	Royal Rhodesia Air Force Ensign	Azure blue flag with the Union Jack in the canton and the roundel of the Royal Rhodesian Air Force in the fly.
	1963–1968	Royal Rhodesia Air Force Ensign	Azure blue flag with the Union Jack in the canton and the roundel of the Royal Rhodesian Air Force in the fly.
	1970–1979	Rhodesian Air Force Ensign	A Sky blue flag with the Rhodesian flag in the canton and the roundel of the Rhodesian Air Force in the fly.
	1979–1980	Flag of the Zimbabwe Rhodesian Air Force	A Sky blue flag with the Zimbabwe Rhodesia flag in the canton and the roundel of the Rhodesian Air Force in the fly.

== Political flags ==
Flag	Date	Use	Description
	1962-1981	Rhodesian Front	

== Town flags ==
Flag	Date	Use	Description
		Flag of Fort Victoria	Fort Victoria coat of arms in the centre
	c1976 -1986	Flag of Gwelo	Tricolore flag with Gweru coat of arms on white stripe.
		Flag of Salisbury	Salisbury coat of arms on a white background
	c. 1955 - 1985	Flag of Umtali	Umtali banner of arms form
