= Rhodesian Air Force Ensign =

Flag of the Rhodesian Air Force

- Use: Air Force Ensign
- Adopted: 1970
- Design: A sky Blue Ensign with the RhAF roundel
- Designed by: Government of Rhodesia
- Flag of the Royal Rhodesian Air Force
- Adopted: 1963
- Relinquished: 1970
- Flag of the RRAF under the Federation
- Adopted: 1954
- Relinquished: 1963

The Rhodesian Air Force Ensign was used as the flag of the Rhodesian Air Force. The first flag was created in 1954 under the Federation of Rhodesia and Nyasaland, being updated following Southern Rhodesia exiting the Federation in 1963. It was updated further in 1970 when Rhodesia unilaterally declared itself a republic.

== History ==
Originally, Rhodesian aircraft had borne the Royal Air Force Ensign. In 1954, following the establishment of the Federation, the Rhodesian Air Force ensign was raised. In keeping with British Empire and Commonwealth air forces using local versions of the RAF roundel, the Rhodesian Air Force defaced theirs with three assegais. A year later, they were granted a Royal title. Following the breakup of the Federation in 1963, Southern Rhodesia amended the ensign so that it only bore a single assegai.

The ensign remained unchanged, even after Rhodesia breaking away from the British Empire. In 1968, despite a new Flag of Rhodesia being raised to replace the old Rhodesian flag, it was announced by the Rhodesia Herald that the Royal Rhodesian Air Force would retain their ensign. Following the declaration of the republic, where Queen Elizabeth II formally revoked the force's royal title, it was felt inappropriate for the ensign to retain the Union Jack in canton. Accordingly, a new ensign was created with the flag of Rhodesia replacing the Union Jack and a new green and white roundel with a Lion and Tusk to replace the RAF and assegai roundel. The new ensign was first used on 5 March 1970, three days after the declaration of the republic.

Zimbabwe Rhodesian ensign

After the Internal Settlement and the establishment of Zimbabwe Rhodesia, the Rhodesian Air Force ensign was changed. This was the only military flag to change during this time, with the new flag of Zimbabwe Rhodesia replacing the flag of Rhodesia in the ensign's canton.
