= Flag of Zimbabwe =

Republic of Zimbabwe
- Use: National flag and ensign
- Proportion: 1:2
- Adopted: April 18th, 1980
- Design: Seven horizontal stripes of green, yellow, red, black, red, yellow and green with a black-edged white isosceles triangle base on the hoist side bearing a Zimbabwe bird superimposed on a red five-pointed star.
- Designed by: Cedric Herbert
- Presidential flag of Zimbabwe
- Adopted: 1987

The national flag of Zimbabwe consists of seven even horizontal stripes of green, gold, red and black with a white triangle containing a red five-pointed star with a Zimbabwe Bird. The present design was adopted on 18 April 1980.

The soapstone bird featured on the flag represents a statuette of a bird found at the ruins of Great Zimbabwe. The bird, first used in 1924 on the Southern Rhodesian coat of arms, symbolises the history of Zimbabwe; the red star beneath it officially stands for the nation's aspirations but is commonly thought to symbolise communism and socialism, and the revolutionary struggle for freedom and peace. The design is based on the flag of Zimbabwe's ruling party, the Zimbabwe African National Union – Patriotic Front (ZANU–PF).

== History ==
The first official use of the Zimbabwe Bird was on the Southern Rhodesian coat of arms, adopted in 1924.

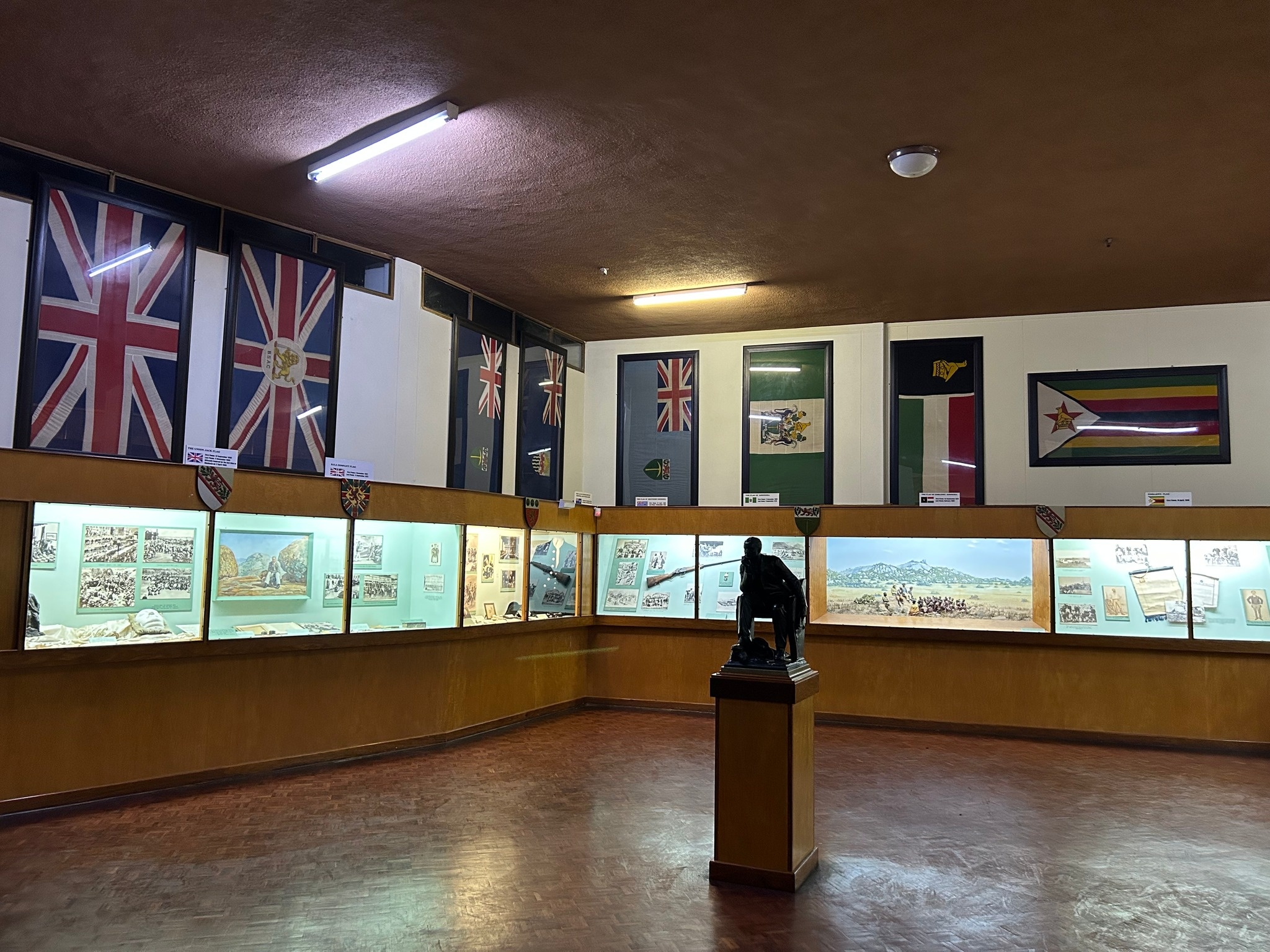
Flags used over time, beginning with the Union Jack, displayed at the Natural History Museum of Zimbabwe in Bulawayo

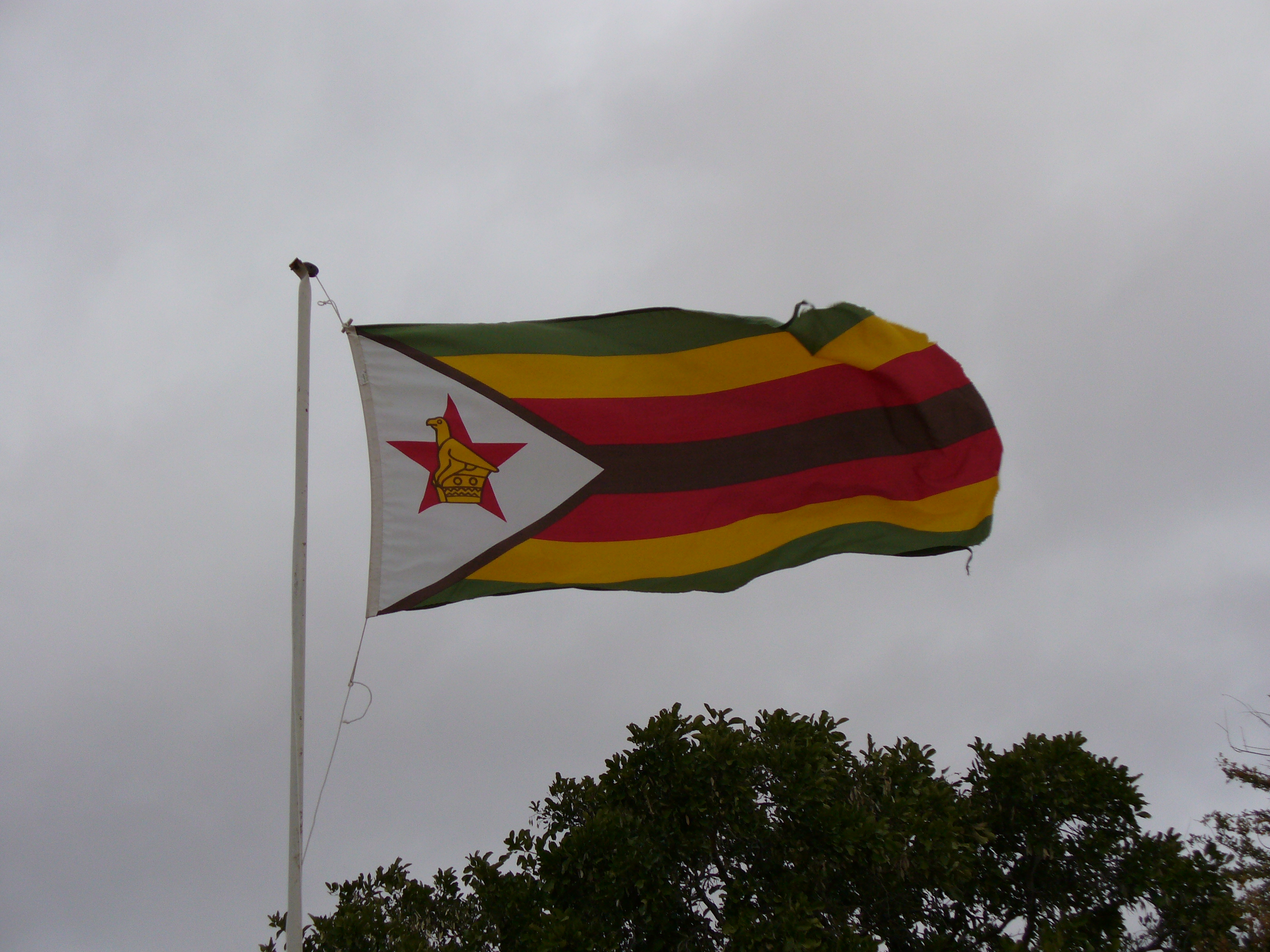
The Zimbabwean flag flying in the breeze

The country now known as Zimbabwe was formally known as Southern Rhodesia from 1895 to 1980—although simply Rhodesia was used locally between 1964 until June 1979 after Northern Rhodesia obtained its independence—and then Zimbabwe Rhodesia between June and December 1979. Southern Rhodesia achieved responsible government in 1923, and thereby became a British self-governing colony following three decades of rule by the British South Africa Company. Following the granting of responsible government, a flag was adopted which followed the standard British colonial practice, being a Blue Ensign, defaced with the shield from the Southern Rhodesian coat of arms. This basic design was used until 1968, although a light blue ensign was introduced in April 1964 following the break-up of the Federation of Rhodesia and Nyasaland. On 11 November 1968, three years after the predominantly white government unilaterally declared independence from Britain, a national flag based on a completely new design was adopted. This was a green-white-green vertical triband, charged centrally with the national coat of arms. It was the first national flag to contain the Zimbabwe Bird, which had been present in the coat of arms since 1924.

In 1979, when the country reconstituted itself as Zimbabwe Rhodesia following the Internal Settlement between the government and moderate black nationalists, a new flag was adopted to mark the transition on 4 September of that year. The flag of Zimbabwe Rhodesia was designed by Flight Lieutenant Cedric Herbert of the Rhodesian Air Force and a member of the Rhodesian Heraldry and Genealogy Society.

The design incorporated the pan-African colours of yellow, black, green and red, with the soapstone bird of Great Zimbabwe, representing an older, pre-colonial source of power and identity in yellow on a vertical black stripe, symbolising the importance of majority rule, and three horizontal stripes, one red representing the blood spilled in the struggle for majority rule, one white, representing the integral part of the European community and other minorities in all aspects of the country's life, and one green, reflecting the importance of agriculture to the country's well-being. The new design had little support from black politicians, who described it as "the flag with two names", a reference to Zimbabwe Rhodesia.

The Voice of Zimbabwe radio service operated by Robert Mugabe's ZANU–PF from Maputo in Mozambique carried a commentary entitled "The proof of independence is not flags or names", dismissing the changes as aimed at "strengthening the racist puppet alliance's position at the Zimbabwe conference in London".

This flag was officially superseded in December 1979 when Britain took interim control of the country following the Lancaster House Agreement which ended the Rhodesian Bush War. The Union Jack was used as the official flag of the country, although de facto the Zimbabwe Rhodesia flag continued to be flown, while fresh elections were held in February 1980. At midnight between 17 and 18 April 1980, the country was granted independence by Britain under the name of Zimbabwe. A new national flag was adopted, the draft for which had been handed to the Minister of Public Works Richard Hove by an unspecified designer. The initial design did not include the Zimbabwe Bird, which was added at the suggestion of Cederic Herbert, who pointed out its uniqueness and history. The final draft went through the approval of the Prime Minister-elect Robert Mugabe. The adoption of the new flag coincided with the swearing-in of Canaan Banana as the country's new president. The Zimbabwe Bird, used on every flag since 1968, is based on a statue discovered from the medieval ruined city of Great Zimbabwe in the country's south-east.

Flag of the British South Africa Company
(1890–1923)

Flag of Southern Rhodesia
(1924–1964)
(1979–1980)

Flag of Rhodesia and Nyasaland
(1953–1963)

Flag of Southern Rhodesia
(1964–1965)
Flag of Rhodesia
(1965–1968)

Flag of Rhodesia
(1968–1979)
bearing the Zimbabwe Bird

Flag of Zimbabwe Rhodesia
(1979)

== Display and use ==
=== Display on uniforms ===
Some police officers in Zimbabwe have the national flag displayed on their uniforms' sleeve tops.

== Design ==
=== Colours and symbolism ===
The flag of the Zimbabwe African National Union – Patriotic Front

The national flag of Zimbabwe is made up of five different colours: green, gold, red, black and white. Officially, the colours of the flag of Zimbabwe carry political, regional, and cultural meanings. Green represents the agriculture and rural areas of Zimbabwe. Yellow stands for the wealth of minerals in the country, predominantly gold. The red symbolises the blood shed during the first and second Chimurenga (wars) in the "struggle for independence". The black indicates the heritage, race and ethnicity of the black majority.

The white triangle is a symbol for peace. The golden bird, known as the "Great Zimbabwe Bird" (Hungwe) is the national symbol of Zimbabwe and is most likely a representation of the African fish eagle. It "exemplifies the strong bond that ancestral humans had with animals, nature and spiritual guides" and it is treated with a high level of importance and respect. The red star represents the nation's aspirations, taken to be communism and socialism as promoted by the ruling Zimbabwe African National Union – Patriotic Front, and whose party flag was used as the basis for the flag of the nation. The use of ZANU—PF's colours is viewed as a sign of deference towards the party.

=== Specifications and the correct rendering of the Great Zimbabwe Bird ===
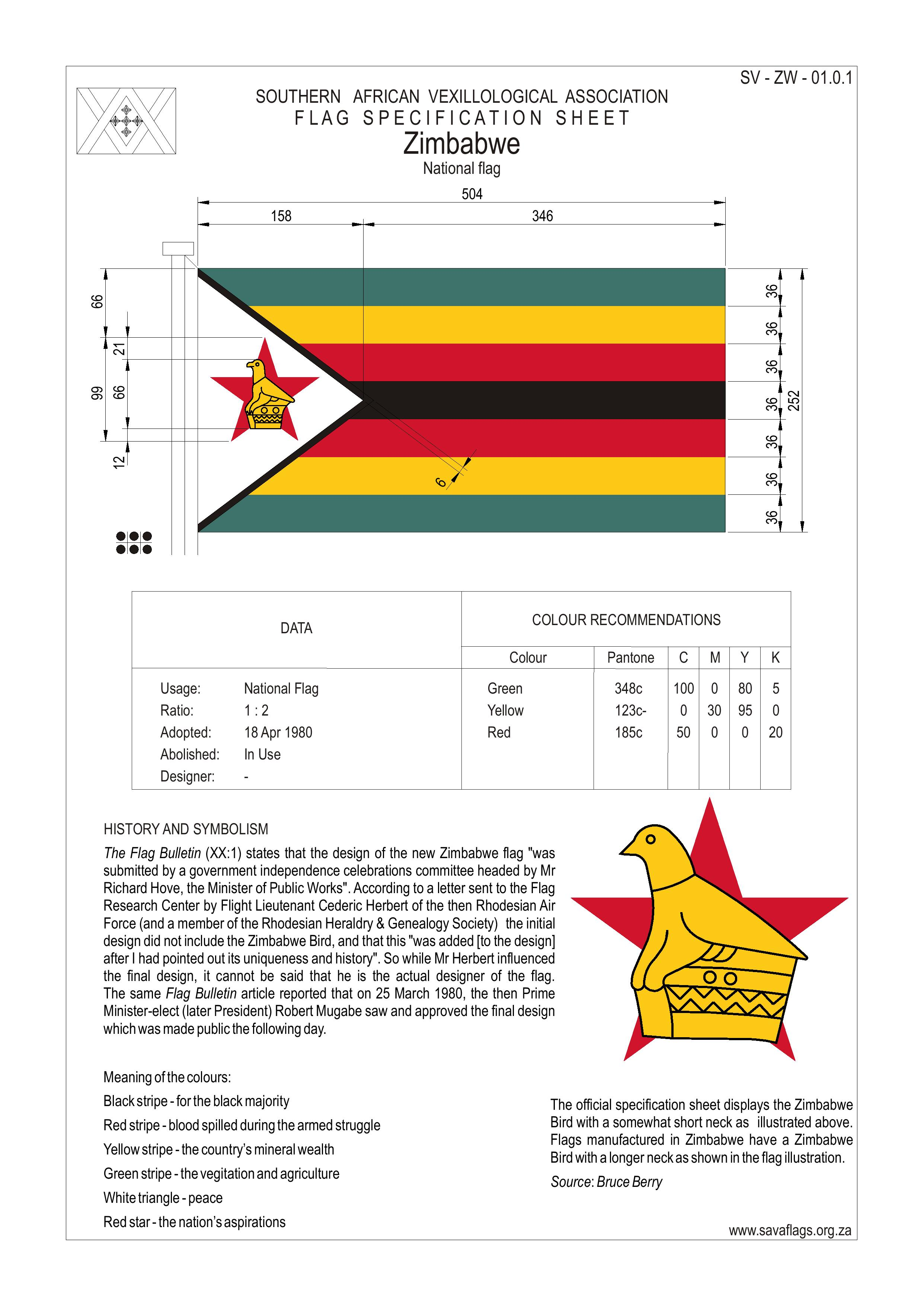
Zimbabwe National Flag Specifications showing both renditions of the Zimbabwe Bird.

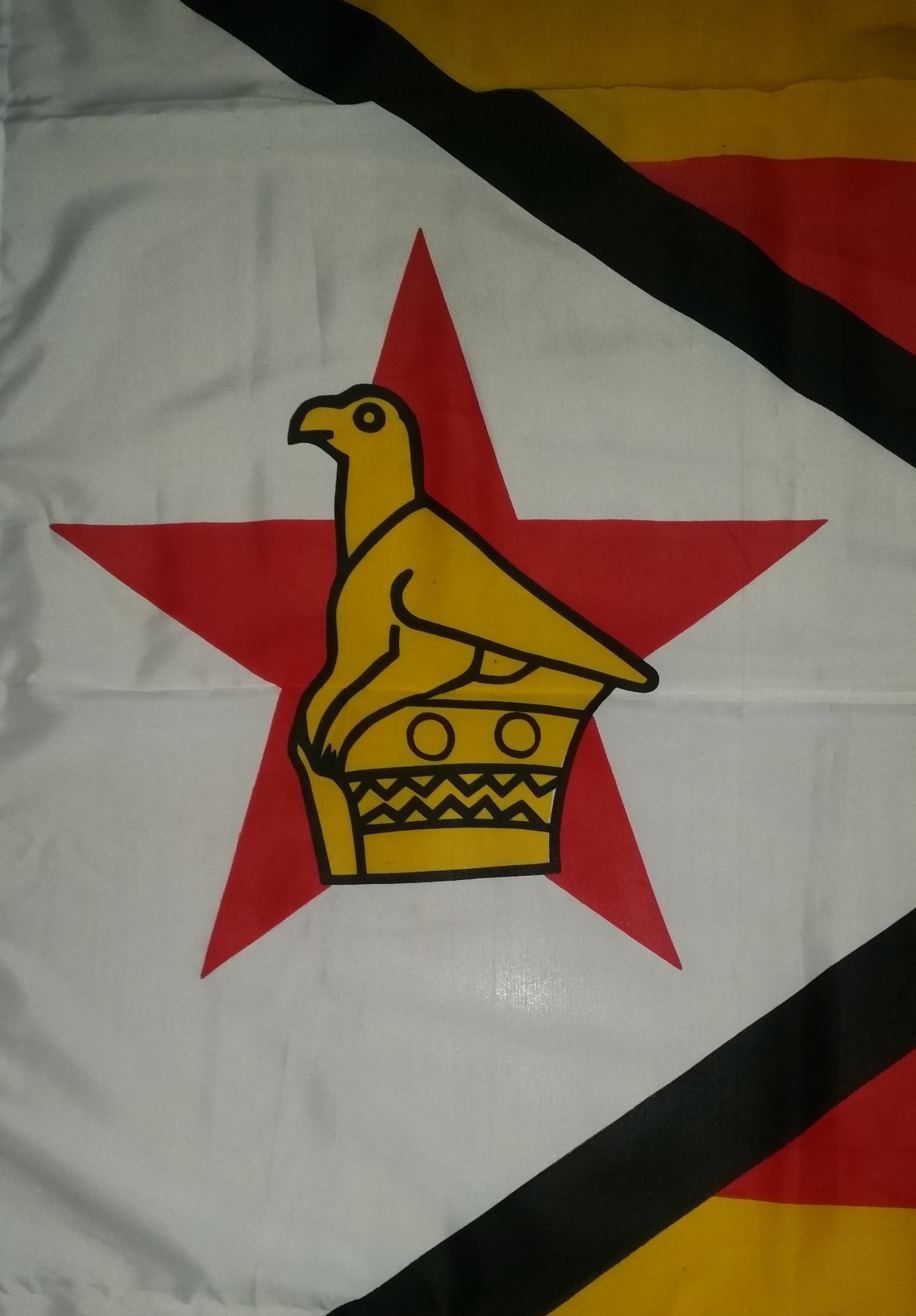
Close up of the Zimbabwe Bird on a flag manufactured in Zimbabwe

The Great Zimbabwe Bird first appeared in an armorial sense when it was incorporated in the coat of arms of Southern Rhodesia, which were granted by Royal Warrant on 11 August 1924. It was first used on a national flag when the full arms were displayed on the Rhodesian flag that was adopted on 11 November 1968. It then appeared alone on the Zimbabwe Rhodesian flag of 1979, and it is now displayed on the flag of Zimbabwe. The arms of 1924 were initially retained by the Zimbabwean Government until a new coat of arms were adopted on 12 September 1981.

The Zimbabwe Bird depicted on the flag is rendered in the same format as it appeared on the arms of 1924 and as it appeared on the Rhodesian flag of 1968 and the Zimbabwe Rhodesian flag of 1979. The red star on which the bird is placed is a regular star. However, a different, rather flattened version of the bird, sometimes displayed on an irregular, flattened star, is often seen on flags that are manufactured outside of Zimbabwe. The origin of this discrepancy appears to be an illustration of the proposed new flag that was first released by the Zimbabwe Ministry of Information in April 1980, just prior to the country attaining full independence. This illustration showed the bird in a flattened version positioned over an irregular star. The poor quality of the illustration, with the star appearing as irregular on the flag, but regular under the description of the meanings on the right, and with the Zimbabwe Bird being omitted completely from where it should be next to the words The National Emblem, would suggest that it was done in haste and without accuracy. Nevertheless, in the absence of a better source, vexillologists outside of Zimbabwe have used this illustration as the basis for their rendering of the emblem on the flag, which has then been copied by many flag manufacturers outside of Zimbabwe. Meanwhile, flag manufacturers inside Zimbabwe continue to produce flags emblazoned with the original version of the bird sitting on a regular star. As a result, these two variations of the Zimbabwean flag are both in common use; however, the version of the flag with the regular star is the correct one according to official specifications.

== In popular culture ==
On 7 August 1980, Samora Machel made a famous speech involving the national flag of Zimbabwe, in which he said while holding the flag, "This flag covers everyone. There are no blacks in Zimbabwe, there are no whites, there are no mulattos and Indians, today there are just Zimbabweans."

In Harare, Zimbabwe, in 2011, the Zimbabwean reported that many cars displayed one or multiple small flag icons. Sales of the national flag were extremely high in the country. According to Petina Gappah in The Guardian in 2010, the flag is a "reminder that the nation was born of pain".

== See also ==
- List of Zimbabwean flags
- List of Rhodesian flags
