= Flag of Southern Rhodesia =

Southern Rhodesia
- Use: National flag
- Adopted: 1924; 1963 (re-adopted)
- Relinquished: 1953; 1964 (re-relinquished)
- Design: A Blue Ensign with the coat of arms of Southern Rhodesia
- Designed by: Government of Southern Rhodesia
- Adopted: 1964 (Southern Rhodesia); 1965 (Rhodesia)
- Relinquished: 1965 (Southern Rhodesia); 1968 (Rhodesia)

The flag of Southern Rhodesia was a Blue Ensign, later changed to a sky-blue ensign, with the coat of arms of Southern Rhodesia on it. The flag was in use in Southern Rhodesia (later Zimbabwe) from 1924 to 1953 and from 1963 to 1965. It was also used by the unrecognised Rhodesia from 1965 to 1968. The flag was initially used unofficially internally before being approved for use outside of the colony by the Colonial Office in 1937. The colour was changed to sky blue in 1964 to protest the treatment of Southern Rhodesia after its inclusion in the failed Federation of Rhodesia and Nyasaland.

== Construction ==
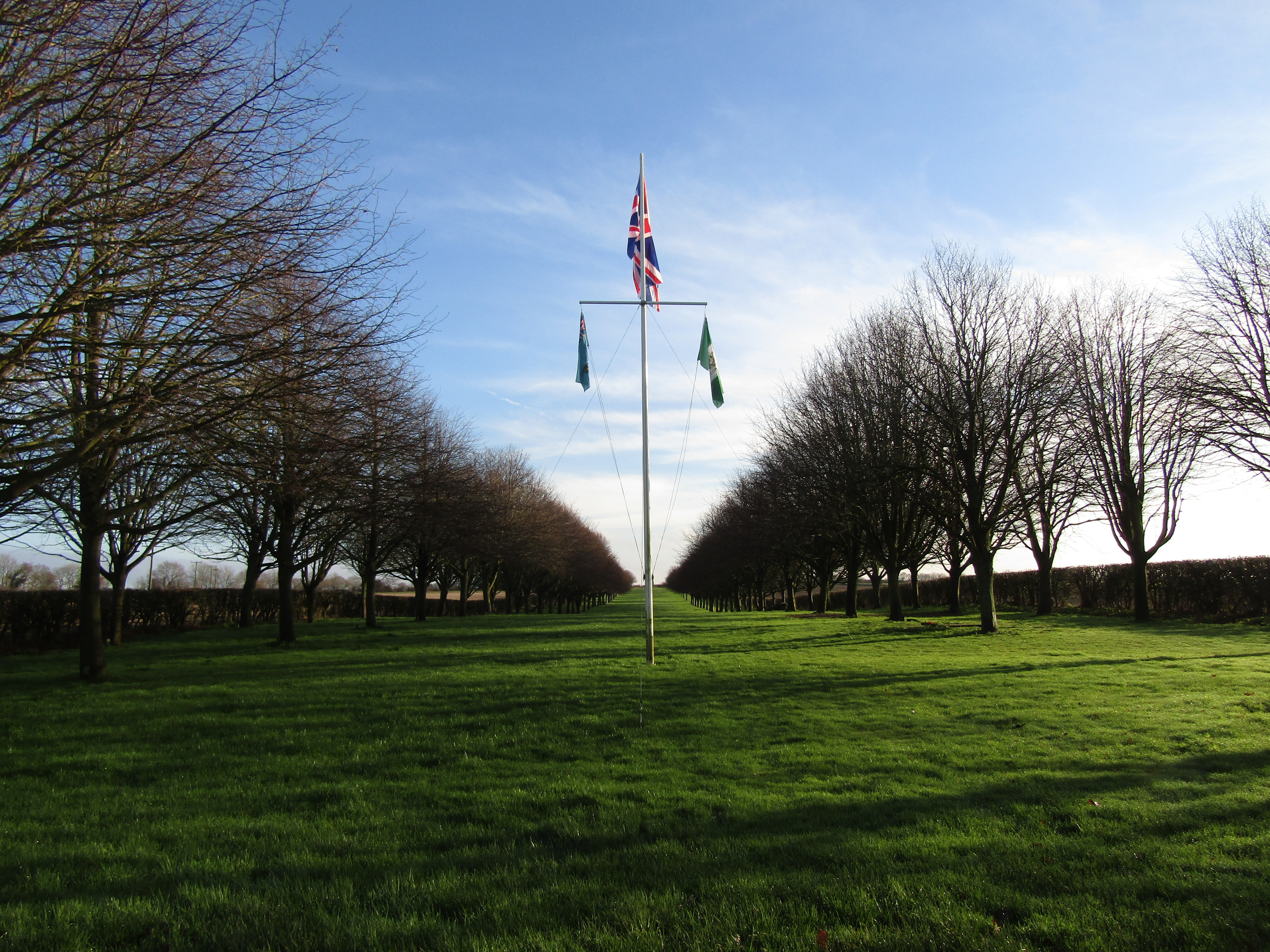
Southern Rhodesia Memorial Avenue in Norfolk; the pale blue Southern Rhodesia flag is flying on the left

The flag of Southern Rhodesia consisted of a Blue Ensign with the Union Jack in canton. The coat of arms was designed to be symbolic of Southern Rhodesia. The lion and thistles came from the coat of arms of Cecil Rhodes, the founder of Southern Rhodesia, and the yellow pick on a green background symbolised mining and farming.

== History ==
=== Southern Rhodesia ===
The flag of Southern Rhodesia was adopted in 1924 by the Southern Rhodesian Legislative Assembly, owing to Southern Rhodesia's status after voting for responsible government separate from the British South Africa Company instead of joining the Union of South Africa. This could have created a situation that would have made it the "Ulster of South Africa" as termed by Sir Charles Coghlan. As a result, it was governed by the Dominion Office and not the Colonial Office as a Crown colony. In 1925, the organisers of the British Empire Exhibition asked the Southern Rhodesian High Commission which flag to use to represent them. The Southern Rhodesian government suggested the flag of Southern Rhodesia. However, in 1928, the Colonial Office stated that Southern Rhodesia did not have consent to use the flag of Southern Rhodesia officially and instead claimed that the Union Jack was the only official flag for Southern Rhodesia despite the government approving it as a flag badge. The confusion over the flag was resolved in 1937 after it was agreed that for the Coronation of King George VI and Queen Elizabeth, Southern Rhodesia should have its own flag to represent it. The Colonial Office agreed it would be the most appropriate to use the flag designed by the Southern Rhodesian High Commission and made it official however the Southern Rhodesian High Commissioner stated that this only approved the flag of Southern Rhodesia for official use outside the colony and the Union Jack was the official flag internally.

The flag of the Federation of Rhodesia and Nyasaland. The red lion represents Southern Rhodesia.

In 1956, Southern Rhodesia entered into a federal union with Northern Rhodesia and Nyasaland to form the Federation of Rhodesia and Nyasaland. Upon union, a Blue Ensign with a unified badge was adopted to replace the respective previous flags. Southern Rhodesia was represented in the federation's flag by a red lion that had previously been on their old flag.

=== Rhodesia ===
Following the collapse of the federation in 1964, Southern Rhodesia then started calling itself Rhodesia and adopted a new flag at the behest of the Prime Minister of Rhodesia as a protest against the federation and the British government. The new flag used the same details as the previous one, but instead used a sky-blue background rather than the traditional dark blue. The new flag used the same colour as the Royal Air Force Ensign because the government wanted to make the Rhodesian flag more recognisable and it was chosen as a way to protest against the British government's treatment of Southern Rhodesia during their time as part of the Federation. After the breakup of the federation, black Rhodesians viewed the new flag as a symbol of white supremacy as it was created by Prime Minister Ian Smith's minority government and the British government did not veto the change despite having the power to do so. Following the Unilateral Declaration of Independence (UDI) in 1965, Rhodesia continued to use the flag of Southern Rhodesia as a symbol of loyalty to Queen Elizabeth II, whom they recognised as the Queen of Rhodesia. This was despite the British government not recognising UDI or a separate Rhodesian monarchy. Smith said: "Let there be no doubt that we in this country stand second to none in our loyalty to the Queen, and whatever else other countries may have done or may yet do, it is our intention that the Union Jack will continue to fly in Rhodesia and the national anthem continue to be sung."

Despite Smith's claim, some Rhodesians felt that the flag implied that Rhodesia was still a colony and not an independent nation. In 1967, the Cabinet of Rhodesia started a contest to design a new flag for the country. The committee in charge of the contest specifically precluded the Union Jack being part of it, stating: "Whether or not Rhodesia retains a connection with the Crown, the independence of this country must be seen to be a fact. Since the confrontation with Britain the Committee believe that sentiment in the country will be against the continued use of the Union Flag. For these two reasons the Committee recommend that the Union Flag should not be incorporated into the new Rhodesian flag." There were calls for the Southern Rhodesian flag to be retained, led by the Minister of Foreign Affairs the Duke of Montrose, who said it represented Rhodesia's past and was a symbol of their active rebellion against the British government. Despite these calls, the flag of Southern Rhodesia was abandoned and replaced with the new flag of Rhodesia in 1968. During the formal changeover ceremony on the third anniversary of UDI, Smith noticeably expressed sadness when the flag of Southern Rhodesia was lowered to the Last Post.

=== After UDI ===
Owing to Rhodesia's UDI not being recognised officially internationally, whenever Rhodesia appeared on the international stage, the new flag was not used. In 1972, the International Olympic Committee (IOC) invited Rhodesia to compete at the 1972 Summer Olympics. This invitation came with the provision that they used the flag of Southern Rhodesia as they had in 1964 instead of the new flag and used "God Save the Queen" as their anthem instead of "Rise, O Voices of Rhodesia". The Rhodesian Olympic Committee agreed to this however the manager Ossie Plaskitt stated "We are ready to participate under any flag, be it the flag of the Boy Scouts or the Moscow flag. But everyone knows very well that we are Rhodesians and will always remain Rhodesians." Eventually the IOC voted in favour of rescinding the invitation to Rhodesia as African nations threatened a boycott of the Olympics and because the United Kingdom would not issue Southern Rhodesian passports to the athletes.

In 1979, Southern Rhodesia was restored under the direct control of a British governor following the Lancaster House Agreement. Despite the restoration of the colony, the Union Jack was treated as the only official flag of Southern Rhodesia for this time, though the flag of Zimbabwe Rhodesia was also used as a de facto flag. When Lord Soames arrived to become Governor of Southern Rhodesia, the Zimbabwe Rhodesia flag was flying at the airport and not the Union Jack. When asked why, the Rhodesian airport officials stated "We can fly whatever flag we like". The flag of Southern Rhodesia was not used again; it was the Union Jack rather than the Southern Rhodesian flag that was lowered when Britain granted independence to Zimbabwe in April 1980.

== See also ==
- List of Rhodesian flags
