= Zimbabwe Bird =

National emblem of Zimbabwe

The Zimbabwe Bird

The stone-carved Zimbabwe Bird is the national emblem of Zimbabwe, appearing on the national flags and coats of arms of both Zimbabwe and former Rhodesia, as well as on banknotes and coins (first on the Rhodesian pound and then on the Rhodesian dollar). It probably represents the bateleur eagle (Terathopius ecaudatus) or the African fish eagle (Haliaeetus vocifer). The bird's design is derived from a number of soapstone sculptures found in the ruins of the medieval city of Great Zimbabwe.

It is now the definitive icon of independent Zimbabwe, with archaeologist Edward Matenga listing over 100 organizations which now incorporate the bird in their logo.

== Origins ==
The original carved birds are from the ruined city of Great Zimbabwe. It was built by the ancestors of the Shona starting in the 11th century and was inhabited for over 300 years. The ruins, after which modern Zimbabwe was named, cover some 730 hectares (1,800 acres) and are the largest ancient stone construction in sub-Saharan Africa. Among its notable elements are the soapstone bird sculptures, about 40 centimetres (16 inches) tall and standing on columns more than 90 cm (3 ft) tall, which were originally installed on walls and monoliths within the city. They are unique to Great Zimbabwe; nothing like them has been discovered elsewhere.

Various explanations have been advanced to explain the symbolic meaning of the birds. One suggestion is that each bird was erected in turn to represent a new king, but this would have required improbably long reigns. More probably, the Zimbabwe birds represent sacred or totemic animals of the Shona – the bateleur eagle (Shona: chapungu), which was held to be a messenger from Mwari (God) and the ancestors, or the fish eagle (hungwe) which it has been suggested was the original totem of the Shona.

== Colonial acquisition and return to Zimbabwe ==
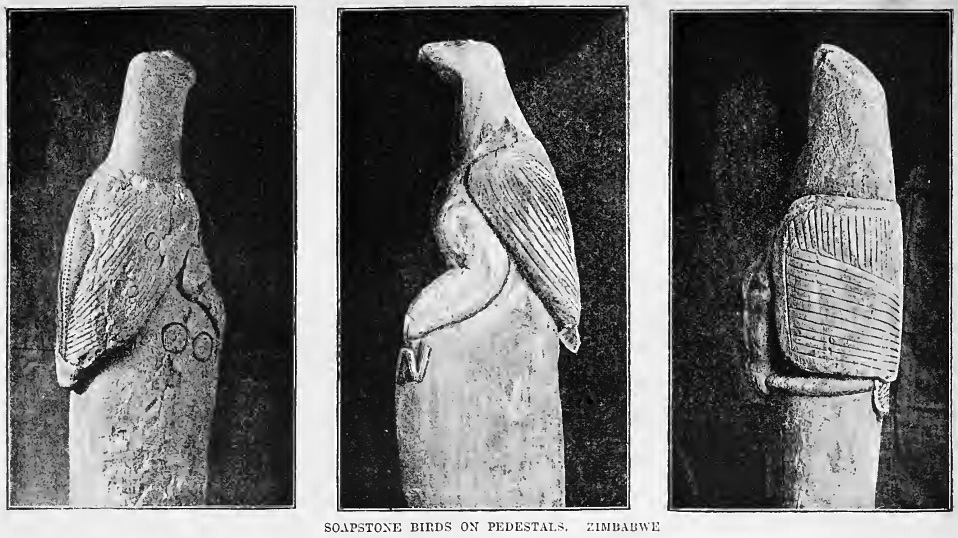
Three of the Zimbabwe Birds, photographed around 1891

In 1889 a European hunter, Willi Posselt, travelled to Great Zimbabwe after hearing about it from another European explorer, Karl Mauch. He climbed to the highest point of the ruins despite being told that it was a sacred site where he should not trespass, and found the birds positioned in the centre of an enclosure around an apparent altar. He later wrote:

Each one, including its plinth, had been hewn out of a solid block of stone and measured 4 feet 6 inches in height; and each was set firmly into the ground. There was also a stone shaped like a millstone and about 18 inches in diameter, with a number of figures carved in the border.

I selected the best specimen of the bird stones, the beaks of the remainder being damaged, and decided to dig it out. But while doing so, Andizibi [a local tribesman] and his followers became very excited and rushed around with their guns and assegais. I fully expected them to attack us. However, I went on with my work but told Klass, who had loaded two rifles, to shoot the first man he saw aiming at either of us.

Posselt compensated Andizibi with a payment of blankets and "some other articles". As the bird on its pedestal was too heavy for him to carry, he hacked it off and hid the pedestal with the intention of returning later to retrieve it. He subsequently sold his bird to Cecil Rhodes, who mounted it in the library of his Cape Town house, Groote Schuur, and decorated the house's stairway with wooden replicas. Rhodes also had stone replicas made, three times the size of the original, to decorate the gates of his house in England near Cambridge. A German missionary came to own the pedestal of one bird, which he sold to the Ethnological Museum in Berlin in 1907.

Rhodes' acquisition of Posselt's bird prompted him to commission an investigation of the Great Zimbabwe ruins by James Theodore Bent, which took place in 1891 following the British South Africa Company's invasion of Mashonaland. Bent recorded that there were eight birds, six large and two small, and that there had probably originally been more as there were several additional stone pedestals of which the tops had been broken off.

The British attributed Great Zimbabwe to ancient Mediterranean builders, believing Black Africans to be incapable of constructing such a complex structure; thus in Rhodes' mind, as a 1932 guidebook put it, it was "a favorite symbol of the link between the order civilisation derived from the North or the East and the savage barbarism of Southern and Central Africa before the advent of the European." Bent attributed the birds to the Phoenicians.

In 1981, a year after the attainment of majority rule in Zimbabwe, the South African government returned four of the sculptures to the country in exchange for a world-renowned collection of Hymenoptera (bees, wasps and ants) housed in Harare; the fifth remains at Groote Schuur.

In April 2026 South Africa repatriated the last of Zimbabwe's soapstone birds, along with eight ancestral human remains. The handover was done by the Minister of Sport, Arts and Culture, Gayton McKenzie. It took place 140 years after the birds were taken from Great Zimbabwe. Return of the ancestral remains also had sacred meaning.

The pedestal kept in Berlin was reunited with the upper part of the statue for an exhibition, Legacies of Stone, in Belgium in 1997. On account of pressure following this, the German museum returned this portion of the bird's pedestal to Zimbabwe in 2003. The birds were displayed for a while in the Natural History Museum in Bulawayo and the Museum of Human Sciences in Harare, but are now housed in a small museum on the Great Zimbabwe site.

== Cultural depictions ==
The Zimbabwe bird has been a symbol of Zimbabwe and its predecessor states since 1924. The crest of Southern Rhodesia's coat of arms incorporated the Zimbabwe bird, and over time the bird became a widespread symbol of the land. The paper money and coins of the Federation of Rhodesia and Nyasaland, issued by the Bank of Rhodesia and Nyasaland, also displayed the bird, as did the Flag of Rhodesia. The flag and state symbols of modern Zimbabwe continue to feature the Zimbabwe Bird. It is now the definitive icon of independent Zimbabwe with Matenga (2001) listing over 100 state, corporate and sporting organisations which incorporate the Bird in their emblems and logos.

National flag of Zimbabwe containing the Zimbabwe Bird

Flag of Zimbabwe Rhodesia (1979–1980)

Flag of Rhodesia (1968–1979)

Coat of Arms of Rhodesia (1924–1981)

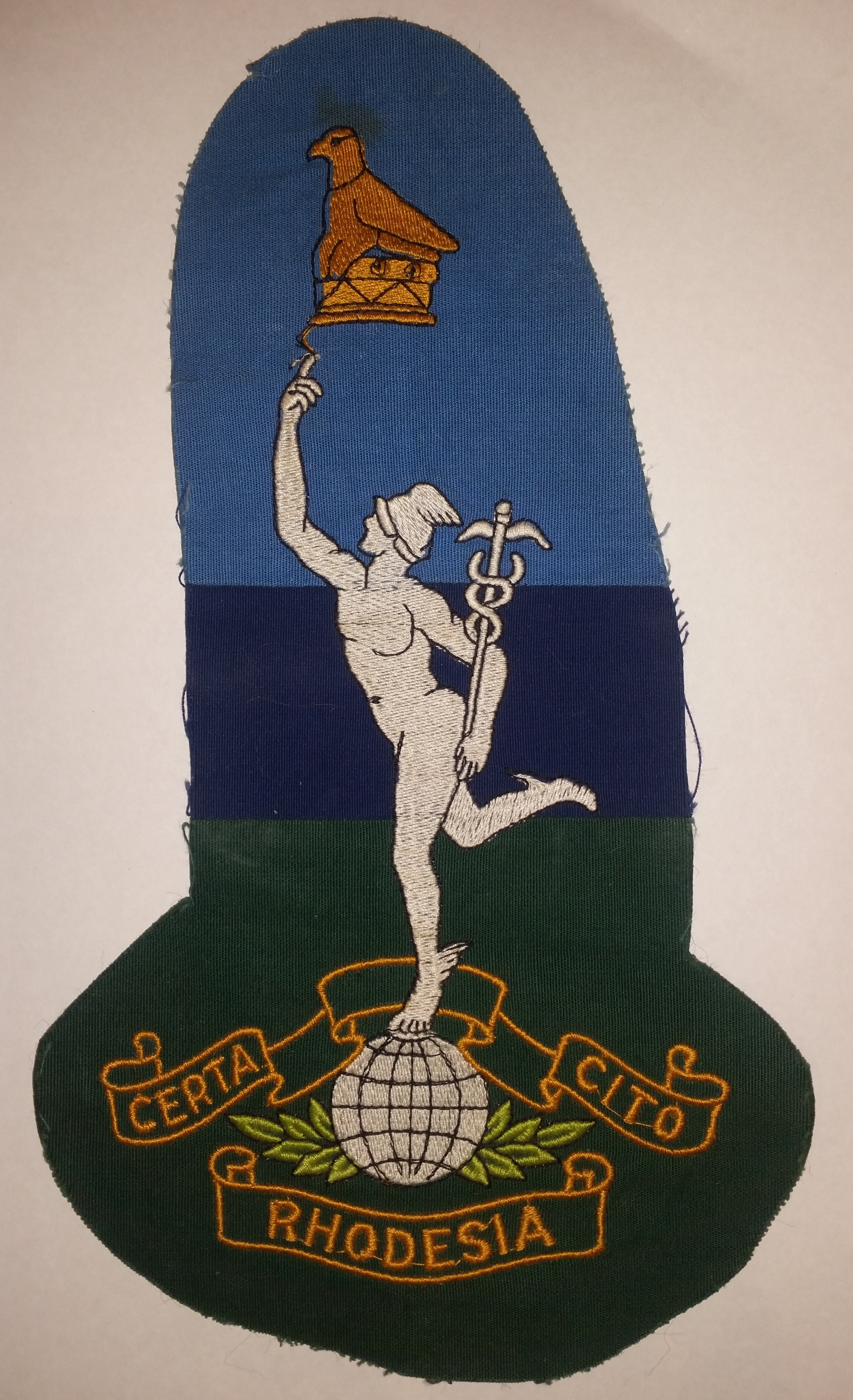
Emblem used by the Rhodesia Corps of Signals (1970–1980)

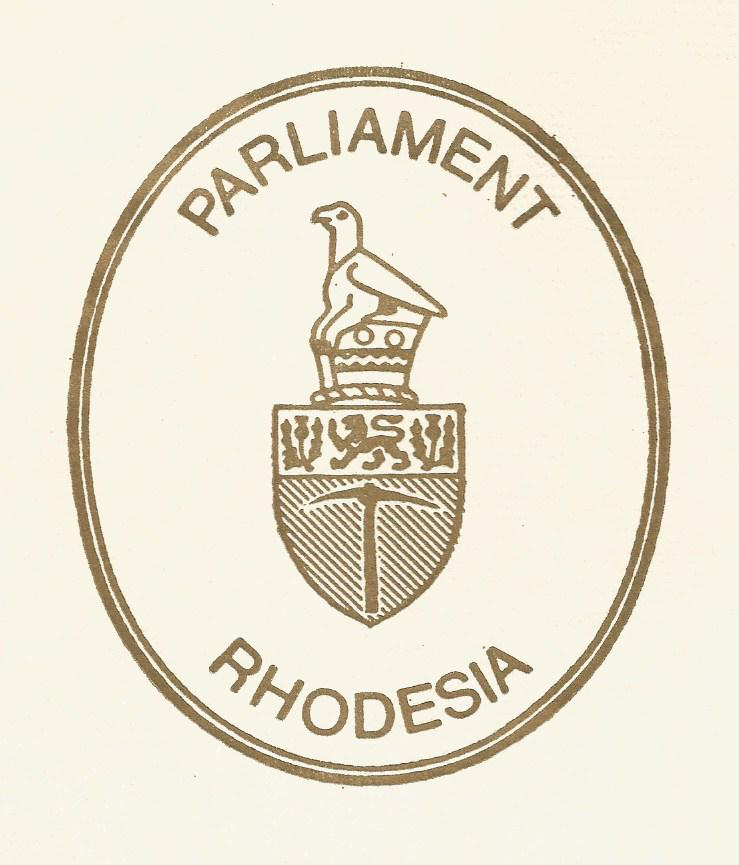
Logo used by the Parliament of Rhodesia

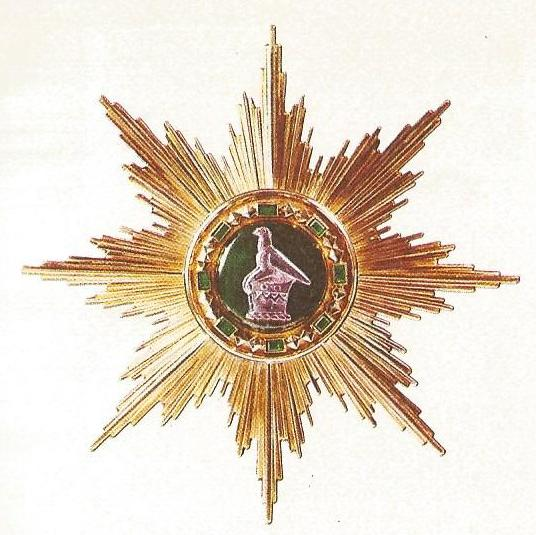
Rhodesian Grand Commander of the Legion of Merit (GCLM) medal (Civil and Military)

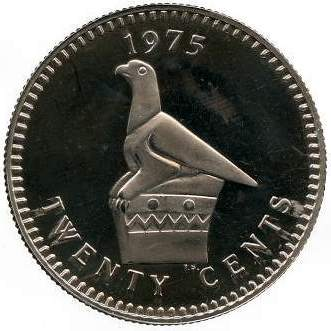
Obverse of a Rhodesian 20c coin

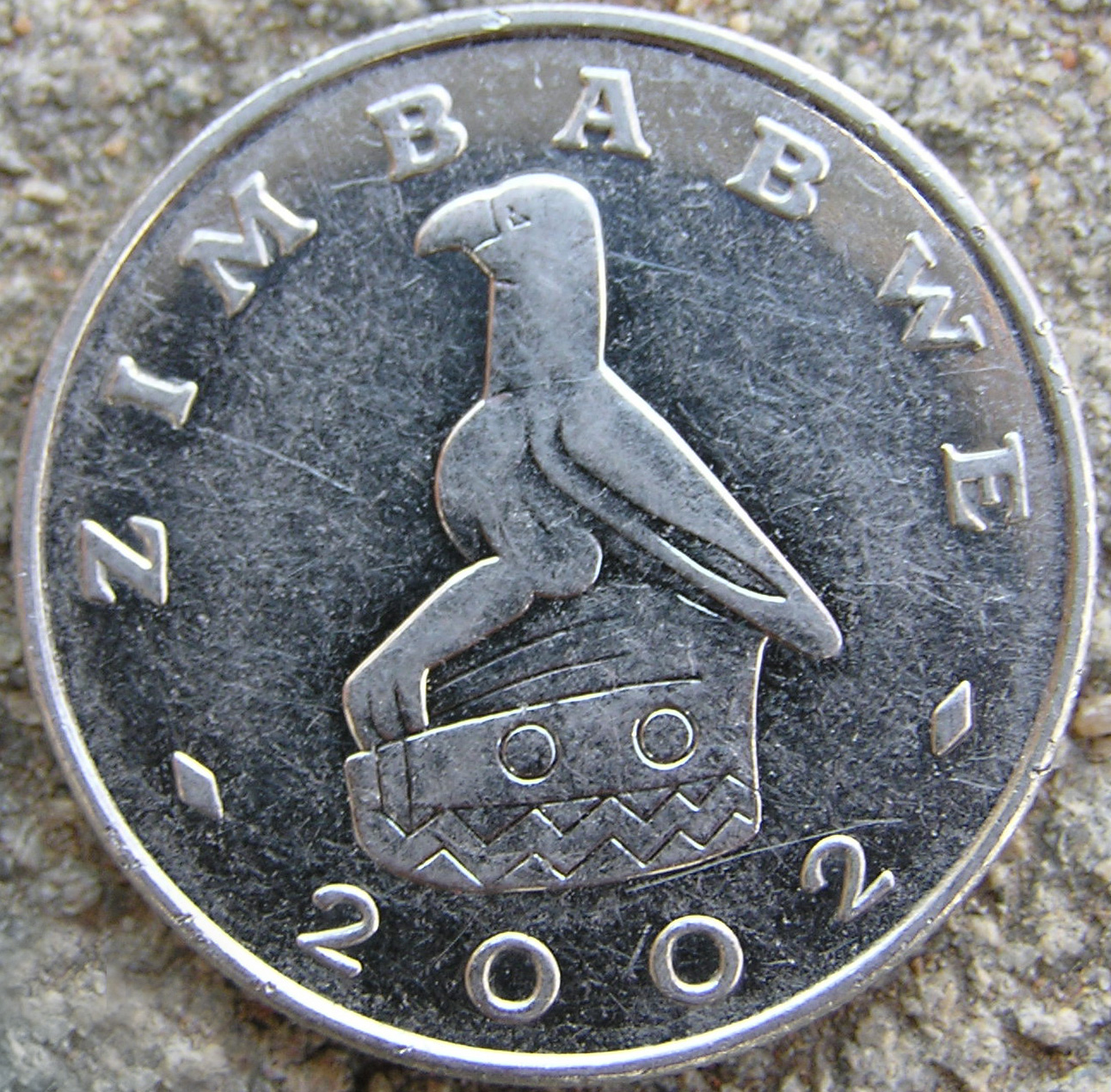
Reverse side of a Zimbabwean one dollar coin

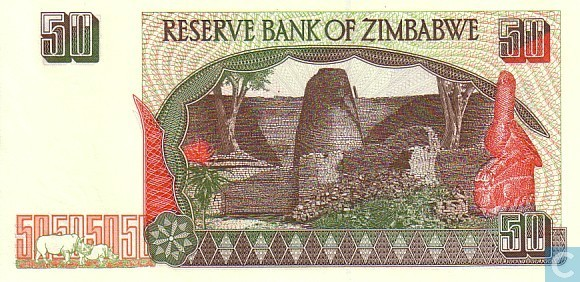
Reverse side of a Zimbabwe fifty dollar note (2nd series) illustrating the Great Zimbabwe Ruins and Zimbabwe Bird in the bottom right hand corner

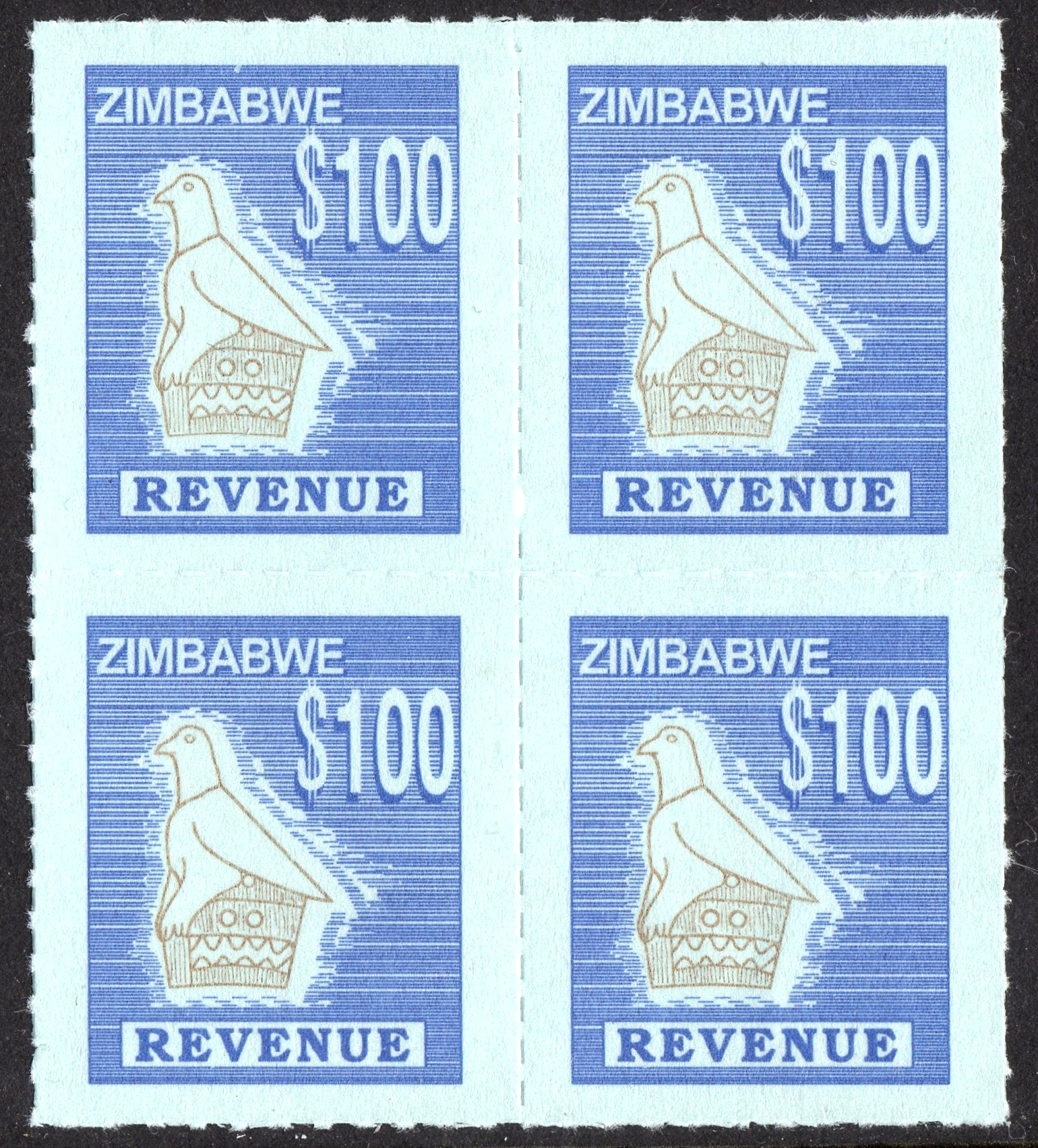
Revenue stamps of Zimbabwe

Coat of Arms of Zimbabwe (1981–)

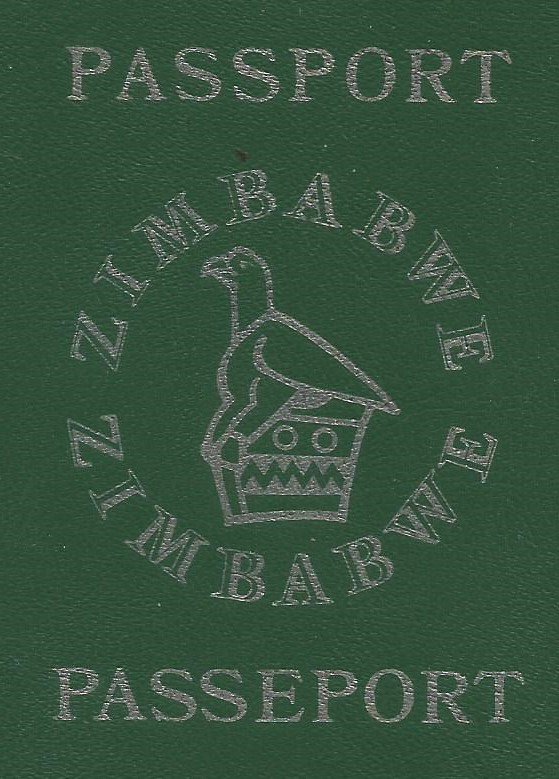
Zimbabwe Passport Cover (1st version) (1980)

Flag of the Zimbabwe Defence Forces

Flag of the Zimbabwe National Army

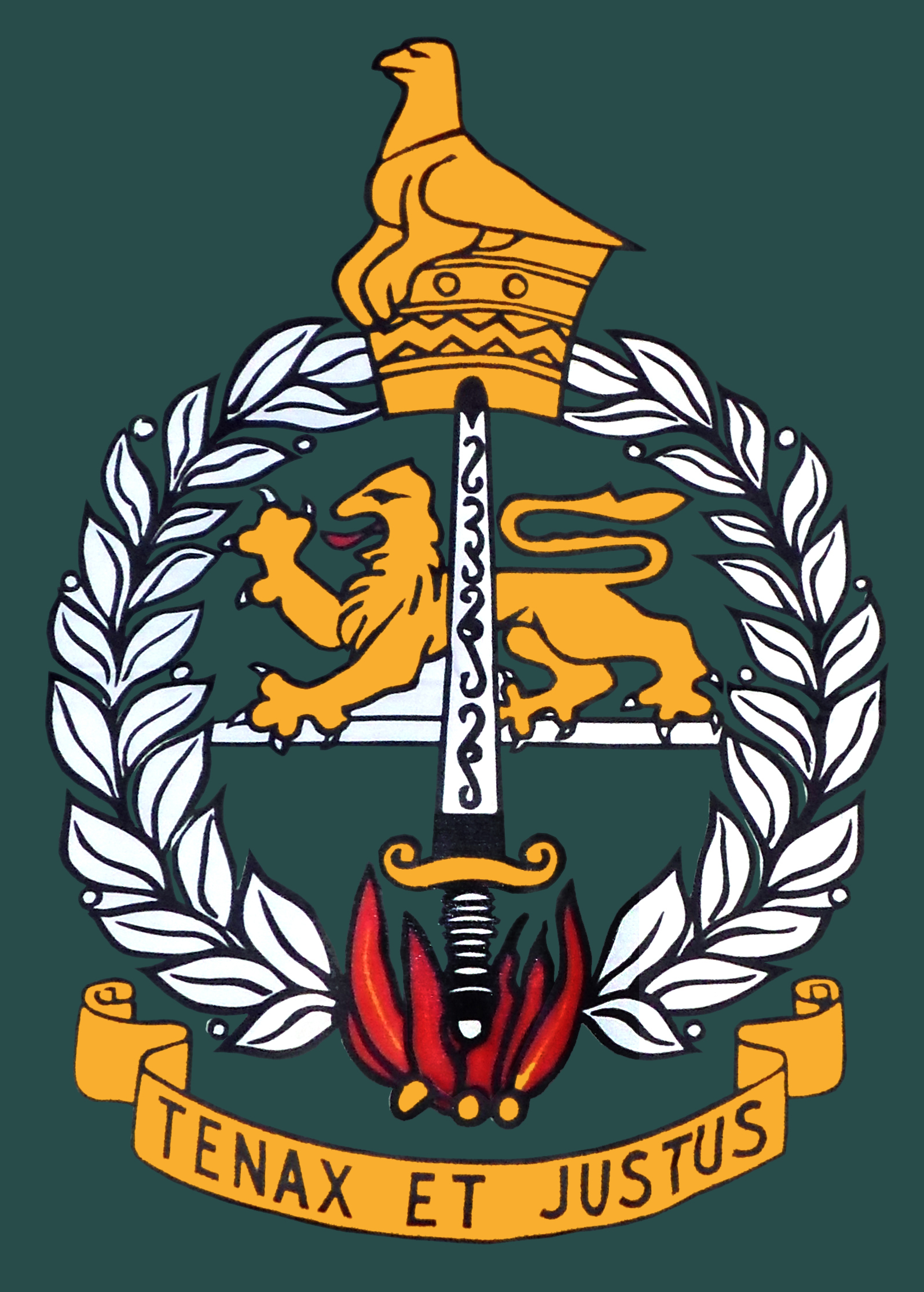
Emblem of the Zimbabwe Prison Service

Flag of the Air Force of Zimbabwe

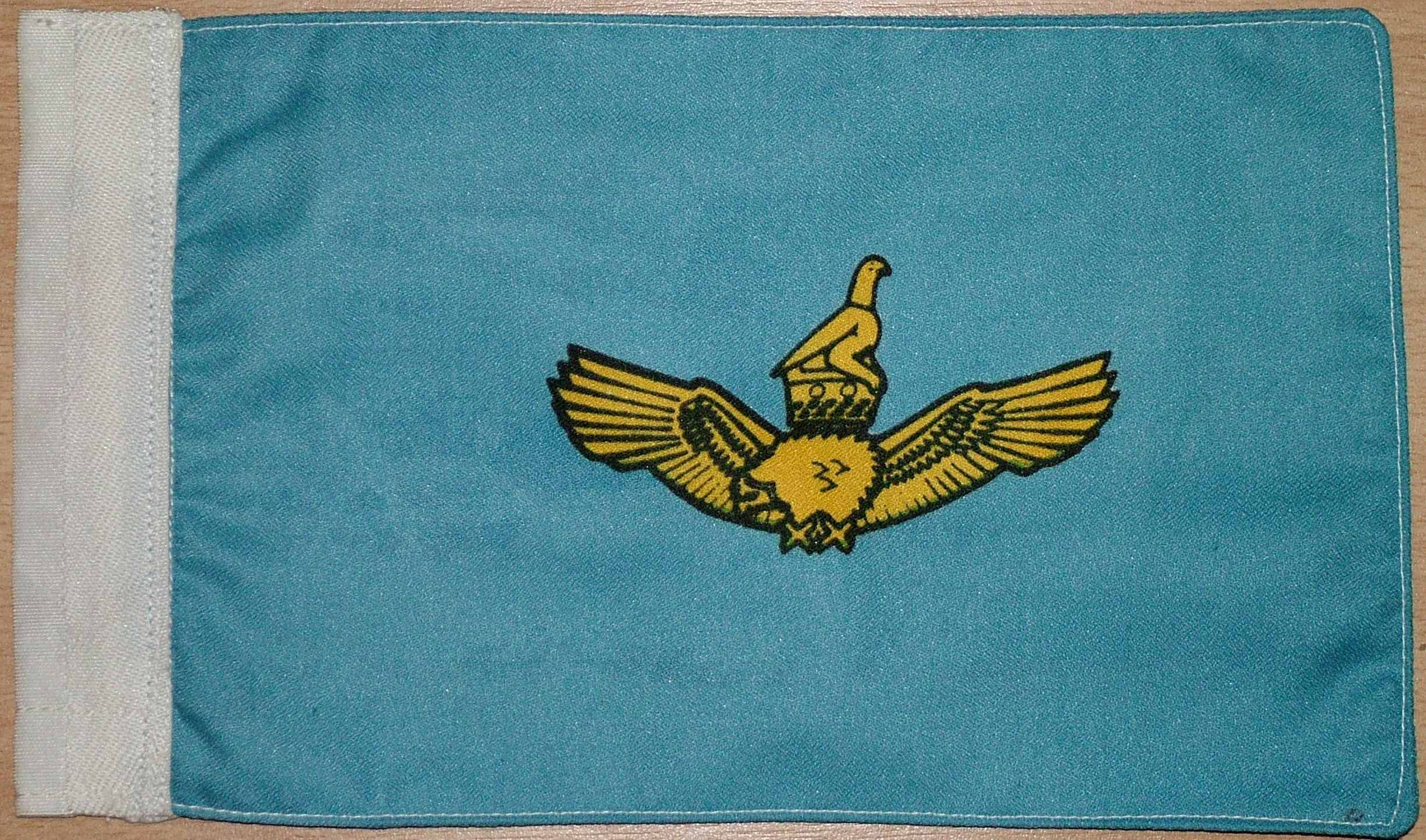
Air Force of Zimbabwe Chief of Staff Car and Aircraft car flag

Flag of Harare, capital of Zimbabwe

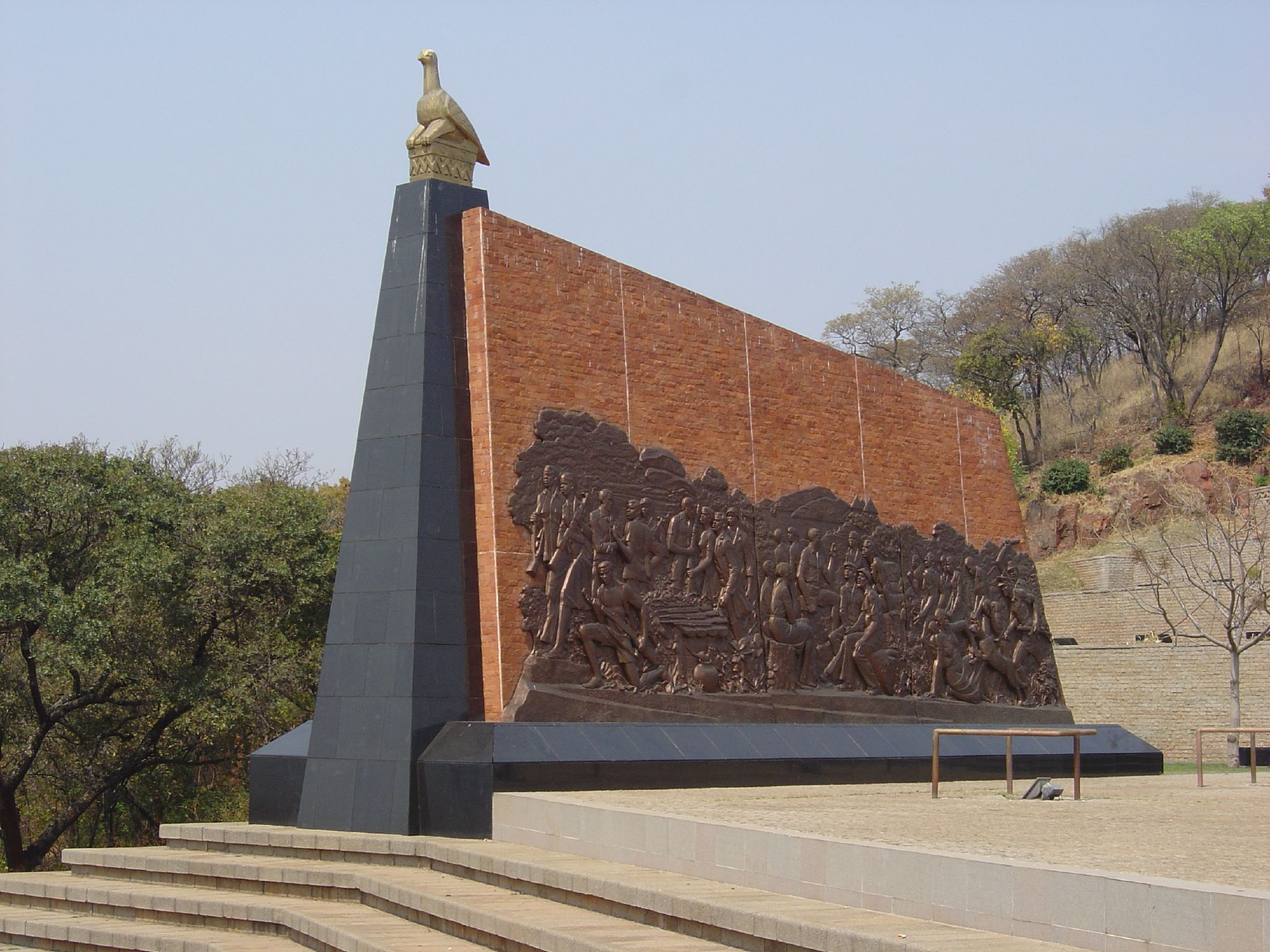
Relief at National Heroes' Acre, Harare

== See also ==
- Saker falcon
