= John Godfrey Huggins, 2nd Viscount Malvern =

British hereditary peer and Royal Air Force officer

John Godfrey Huggins, 2nd Viscount Malvern (26 October 1922 – 28 August 1978) was a British hereditary peer and Royal Air Force officer during the Second World War. He was a member of the House of Lords from 1971 until his death in 1978.

== Early life and education ==
Huggins was the son of Godfrey Huggins, an English doctor working in Southern Rhodesia, later prime minister of Southern Rhodesia, and his wife Blanche Elizabeth Slatter. His father was created Viscount Malvern in 1955. He arrived in England on 23 September 1938 on the RMS Windsor Castle, from Durban, South Africa, and was educated at Winchester College.

== Military service ==
In 1940, Huggins joined the Royal Air Force and was promoted to Flight Lieutenant in 1944. He retired in 1945, but briefly re-joined the Air Force in 1952.

== Career ==
Huggins inherited his father's viscountcy on 8 May 1971 and became a member of the House of Lords.

== Marriage and children ==
On 1 January 1949, Huggins married Patricia Marjorie Bower, a daughter of Frank Renwick Bower. They had three children:

- Michael Paul John Huggins (born 13 October 1946)
- Ashley Kevin Godfrey Huggins, 3rd Viscount Malvern (26 October 1949 - 1997)
- Hon Haoli Elizabeth Jane Huggins (born 20 March 1953)

== Death ==
Lord Malvern died in 1978 at the age of 55. He was succeeded in the viscountcy by his younger, but only legitimate son, Ashley.

Peerage of the United Kingdom
Preceded by Godfrey Huggins	Viscount Malvern; 1971–1978	Succeeded by Ashley Kevin Godfrey Huggins
