= Viscount Malvern =

Extinct viscountcy in the Peerage of the United Kingdom

Viscount Malvern, of Rhodesia and of Bexley in the County of Kent, was a title in the Peerage of the United Kingdom. It was created on 18 March 1955 for the first Prime Minister of the Federation of Rhodesia and Nyasaland, Sir Godfrey Huggins.

The 1st Viscount was succeeded by his elder son, John. The 2nd Viscount was succeeded by his younger, but only legitimate son, Ashley. The 3rd Viscount was unmarried and was succeeded in the viscountcy by his uncle, Martin James Huggins, younger son of the 1st Viscount. The viscountcy became extinct on his death in 2013.

== Viscounts Malvern (1955) ==
- Godfrey Martin Huggins, 1st Viscount Malvern (1883–1971)
- John Godfrey Huggins, 2nd Viscount Malvern (1922–1978)
- Ashley Kevin Godfrey Huggins, 3rd Viscount Malvern (1949–1997)
- Martin James Huggins, 4th Viscount Malvern (1928–2013)

== Arms ==
Coat of arms of Viscount Malvern
Crest A lion sejant rampant guardant Or the sinister paw resting on a fountain. Escutcheon Argent, on a fess Sable between three hearts Gules a lion passant guardant Or. Supporters Dexter, a lion guardant Gules grasping in the exterior forepaw a rod of Aesculapius proper. Sinister, a Sable antelope guardant Proper. Motto Cuncti Perseveramus
