= Coat of arms of Rhodesia and Nyasaland =

State Arms of the Federation of Rhodesia and Nyasaland

The coat of arms of the Federation of Rhodesia and Nyasaland was designed by M.J. Morris (later Information Attaché to the Federal High Commission in Pretoria, South Africa). It was granted by Royal Warrant on 22 July 1954.

The coat of arms had elements to represent all three territories which comprised the Federation. The rising sun on a blue field in the upper shield and leopard were taken from the arms of Nyasaland (modern-day Malawi). The wavy lines on a field at the base of the shield represented Victoria Falls and the eagle derived from the arms of Northern Rhodesia (modern-day Zambia). The dovetail fesse (which links the component parts of the shield), bearing the lion passant, and the sable antelope supporter are from the arms of Southern Rhodesia.

== Blazon (heraldic description) ==
The following is the heraldic description of the state arms of the Federation of Rhodesia and Nyasaland:

Crest
On a wreath of the colours, an Eagle reguardant wings extended Or perched upon and grasping in the talons a Fish Argent.

Supporters
Dexter a sable antelope and sinister a leopard.

Motto (in Latin)
Magni Esse Mereamur (Let us deserve Greatness)

Shield
Per fesse Azure and Sable in Chief a Sun rising Or and in base six Palets wavy Argent over all a fesse dovetailed counter-dovetailed of the last thereon a Lion passant Gules.

Note: The shield component of the arms appears in the fly of the national flag of the Federation

== Legacy ==
These arms are no longer used since the dissolution of the Federation of Rhodesia and Nyasaland on 31 December 1963, but the coat of arms of Zambia currently uses the same shield as used by Northern Rhodesia and in the coat of arms of Malawi there is a rising sun, albeit on a black field and a yellow, rather than red, lion passant in its shield. The current coat of arms of Zimbabwe has white palets on a blue (as opposed to black) background representing the importance of water and symbolic of the Victoria Falls.
