= 1962 Federation of Rhodesia and Nyasaland election =

Federal elections were held in the Federation of Rhodesia and Nyasaland on 27 April 1962. There was a boycott by nearly all opposition parties, with only the Rhodesia Republican Party and some independents running against the ruling United Federal Party (UFP).

== Results ==
The UFP won 54 of the 57 seats, with 40 candidates returned unopposed.

Party	Ordinary seats			African seats			Total seats
Party	Votes	%	Seats	Votes	%	Seats	Total seats
United Federal Party	9,915	74.60	54				54
Rhodesia Republican Party	724	5.45	0				0
Independents	2,651	19.95	1	92	100.00	2	3
Total	13,290	100.00	55	92	100.00	2	57
Valid votes	13,290	99.28		92	100.00		
Invalid/blank votes	96	0.72		0	0.00		
Total votes	13,386	100.00		92	100.00		
Registered voters/turnout	37,743	35.47		5,255	1.75		
Source: Sternberger et al.
