= Flag of Rhodesia and Nyasaland =

Flag of the 1953–1963 British territory in Southern Africa

Flag of the Federation of Rhodesia and Nyasaland

The flag of the Federation of Rhodesia and Nyasaland was a defaced Blue Ensign. Centred in the fly of the flag was a depiction of the shield from the Federation's coat of arms. The rising sun is taken from the colonial arms of Nyasaland (now Malawi), the lion passant is taken from the arms of Southern Rhodesia (now Zimbabwe), and the black and white wavy lines is taken from the arms of Northern Rhodesia (now Zambia). In this form, it shows the Federation of all three British colonies which lasted from 1953 to 1963. This flag flew alongside the Union Jack for the duration of the existence of the Federation.

== See also ==
- Coat of arms of the Federation of Rhodesia and Nyasaland
- List of Rhodesian flags
