= Coat of arms of Zimbabwe =

- Armiger: Republic of Zimbabwe
- Adopted: 1981
- Crest: A mullet gules debruised by a representation of the Great Zimbabwe Bird or.
- Torse: A wreath Or and Vert
- Shield: Vert, a representation of a portion of the Great Zimbabwe proper (Malvern 2021); on a chief argent seven palets wavy azure.
- Supporters: On either side a kudu proper.
- Compartment: An earthen mount adorned with stalks of wheat, a cotton boll and a head of maize, all proper.
- Motto: UNITY, FREEDOM, WORK
- Other elements: Behind the shield are placed in saltire an agricultural hoe, blade pointed to dexter, and an AK automatic rifle in bend sinister, foresight uppermost, all proper.

The coat of arms of Zimbabwe was adopted on 21 September 1981, one year and five months after the national flag was adopted. Previously the coat of arms of Zimbabwe was identical to the former coat of arms of Rhodesia.

== Official description ==
Zimbabwe law describes the coat of arms as follows:

Device	Blazon
Shield	Vert, a representation of a portion of the Great Zimbabwe proper; on a chief argent seven palets wavy azure. Behind the shield are placed in saltire an agricultural hoe, blade pointed to dexter, and an A.K. automatic rifle in bend sinister, foresight uppermost, all proper.
Crest	On a wreath or and vert a mullet gules debruised by a representation of the Great Zimbabwe Bird or.
Supporters	On either side a kudu proper upon an earthen mount adorned with stalks of wheat, a cotton boll and a head of maize, all proper.
Motto	Unity—Freedom—Work
Plants on the compartment	Stalks of wheat, a cotton boll and a head of maize

== Meanings ==
The official symbolism of the Zimbabwean coat of arms is as follows:

- Kudus: the unity of purpose of Zimbabwe's various ethnic groups; the kudus are "a harmonious blend of black, white and brown"
- Earth mound: the plants from which food and clothing is obtained
- Motto: the need to maintain the desire for national unity and the will to work for the preservation of freedom
- Green shield: the fertility of the country's soil and water. Blue and white wavy lines symbolise prosperity-bringing water
- Great Zimbabwe: the historical heritage of Zimbabwe
- Hoe and Rifle: the transition from war to peace
- Wreath of gold and green: the mining and agricultural enterprise which "protects our national economy"
- Star: ancient symbol of hope for the future. Tinctured red to "remind us of the suffering of all our people and the need to avoid any recurrence of that suffering"
- Great Zimbabwe Bird: distinctive national emblem

== History ==
=== Coat of arms of the Kingdom of Mutapa (1569–1760) ===
Coat of arms of the Kingdom of Mutapa

In 1569, Sebastian of Portugal made a grant of arms to the Mwenemutapa. These were blazoned: Gules between two arrows Argent an African hoe barwise bladed Argent handled Or — The shield surmounted by a Crown Oriental. This was probably the first grant of arms to a native of southern Africa; however it is unlikely that these arms were ever actually used by the Mwenemutapa.

=== Coat of arms of Rhodesia (1924–1981) ===
Coat of arms of Rhodesia
- Adopted: 11 August 1924
- Crest: Zimbabwe Bird
- Shield: Vert, a pickaxe paleways Or; upon a chief argent a lion passant gules, armed and langued azure, between two thistles proper
- Supporters: Two Sable Antelopes
- Motto: Sit Nomine Digna (Latin) "May she be worthy of the name"

The coat of arms of Rhodesia was used from 1924–1981, for the self-governing British colony of Southern Rhodesia in 1923–1965 and 1979–1980, known simply as Rhodesia from 1965–1979, Zimbabwe–Rhodesia in 1979, and Zimbabwe from 1980.

Official authorisation by Royal Warrant for the coat of arms was granted on 11 August 1924.

The shield features a red lion passant and two thistles, taken from the family arms of Cecil Rhodes, after whom the colony was named, and the Latin motto Sit Nomine Digna (May She Be Worthy of the Name) is a reference to Rhodes. The pick, in gold on a green field, represents mining, the economic mainstay of the colony. Also featured above the shield is the soapstone statuette of the Zimbabwe Bird found in the ruins of Great Zimbabwe.

The shield of the arms was used on the flag of the colony by being placed in the fly of a British Blue Ensign, in the tradition of most other British colonies. This design changed in 1964 when the field of the flag was changed to light blue. In November 1968, the full coat of arms was placed in the centre of a new Rhodesian flag which was a green, white, green triband. After Rhodesia was declared a republic in 1970, the arms also featured on the President's flag.

The arms remained unchanged following the renaming of the country as Zimbabwe Rhodesia in 1979, and were initially used by the government of Zimbabwe from 18 April 1980 to 21 September 1981, following which the present coat of arms of Zimbabwe were introduced.

== See also ==
- List of Rhodesian flags
