= Federation of Rhodesia and Nyasaland =

British territory from 1953 to 1963

Coordinates: 16°S 29°E

- 1953–1963
- Flag Coat of arms
- Motto: Magni Esse Mereamur "Let Us Achieve Greatness"
- Anthem: "God Save the Queen"
- Status: Colony Protectorate and self-governing colony
- Capital and largest city: Salisbury
- Languages: English, Shona, Tumbuka, Ndebele, Bemba, Chewa, Yao, Tonga, Lozi, Nsenga, Lunda, Kaonde, Lala-Bisa, Lamba, Luvale, Mambwe-Lungu, Lenje, Mwanga, Ila, Mbunda, Ngoni, Sena, Kalanga, Tjwao, Nambya, Ndau, Tsonga, Tswana, Venda, Xhosa
- Government: Federal parliamentary constitutional monarchy
- Monarch
  - 1953–1963: Elizabeth II
- Governor-General
  - 1953–1957: John Llewellin
  - 1957–1963: Simon Ramsay
  - 1963: Humphrey Gibbs
- Prime Minister
  - 1953–1956: Godfrey Huggins
  - 1956–1963: Roy Welensky
- History
  - Federation: 1 August 1953
  - Dissolution: 31 December 1963

Area
  - Total: 1,261,674 km^{2} (487,135 sq mi)

Population
  - Estimate: 10,400,000 (1963)
- Currency: CAF pound
- Time zone: UTC+2 (CAT)
Preceded by
Northern Rhodesia
Southern Rhodesia
Nyasaland
Succeeded by
Northern Rhodesia
Southern Rhodesia
Nyasaland
- Today part of: Malawi; Zambia; Zimbabwe

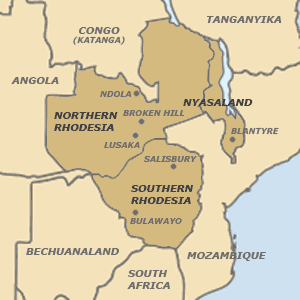
Administrative divisions of the federation

The Federation of Rhodesia and Nyasaland, also known as the Central African Federation (CAF), was a colonial federation that consisted of three southern African territories: the self-governing British colony of Southern Rhodesia and the British protectorates of Northern Rhodesia and Nyasaland. It existed between 1953 and 1963. Rhodesia and Nyasaland bordered Angola (Portuguese province), Bechuanaland (British protectorate), Congo-Léopoldville (Belgian colony before 1960), Mozambique (Portuguese province), South Africa, South West Africa (South African mandate) and Tanganyika (British mandate before 1961).

The Federation was established on 1 August 1953, with a Governor-General as the Queen's representative at the centre. The constitutional status of the three territories – a self-governing Colony and two Protectorates – was not affected, though certain enactments applied to the Federation as a whole as if it were part of Her Majesty's dominions and a Colony. A novel feature was the African Affairs Board, set up to safeguard the interests of Africans and endowed with statutory powers for that purpose, particularly in regard to discriminatory legislation. The economic advantages to the Federation were never seriously called into question, and the causes of the Federation's failure were purely political: the strong and growing opposition of the African inhabitants. The rulers of the new black African states were united in wanting to end colonialism in Africa. With most of the world moving away from colonialism during the late 1950s and early 1960s, the United Kingdom was subjected to pressure to decolonise from both the United Nations and the Organisation of African Unity (OAU). These groups supported the aspirations of the black African nationalists and accepted their claims to speak on behalf of the people.

The federation ended on 31 December 1963. In 1964, shortly after the dissolution, Northern Rhodesia and Nyasaland became independent under the names Zambia and Malawi, respectively. In November 1965, Southern Rhodesia unilaterally declared independence from the United Kingdom as the state of Rhodesia.

== History ==
=== Central African Council ===
In 1929, the Hilton Young Commission concluded that "in the present state of communications the main interests of Nyasaland and Northern Rhodesia, economic and political, lie not in association with the Eastern African Territories, but rather one another and with the self-governing Colony of Southern Rhodesia". In 1938, the Bledisloe Commission concluded that the territories would become interdependent in all their activities, but stopped short of recommending federation. Instead, it advised the creation of an inter-territorial council to coordinate government services and survey the development needs of the region. The Second World War delayed the creation of this institution until 1945, when the Central African Council was established to promote coordination of policy and action between the territories. The Governor of Southern Rhodesia presided over the council and was joined by the leaders of the other two territories. The Council only had consultative, and not binding, powers.

=== Negotiations ===
In November 1950, Jim Griffiths, the Secretary of State for the Colonies, informed the House of Commons that the government had decided that there should be another examination of the possibility of a closer union between the Central African territories, and that a conference of the respective governments and the Central African Council was being arranged for March 1951.

While many points of contention were worked out in the conferences that followed, several proved to be acute, and some, seemingly insurmountable. The negotiations and conferences were arduous. Southern Rhodesia and the Northern Territories had very different traditions for the 'Native Question' (black Africans) and the roles they were designed to play in civil society.^{[}

An agreement would likely not have been reached without Sir Andrew Cohen, CO Assistant Undersecretary for African Affairs (and a later Governor of Uganda). He became one of the central architects and driving forces behind the creation of the Federation, often seemingly singlehandedly untangling deadlocks and outright walkouts on the part of the respective parties. Cohen, who was Jewish and traumatised by The Holocaust, was an anti-racialist and an advocate of African rights. But he compromised his ideals to avoid what he saw as an even greater risk than the continuation of the paternalistic white ascendancy system of Southern Rhodesia – its becoming an even less flexible, radical white supremacy, like the National Party government in South Africa. Lord Blake, the Oxford-based historian, wrote: "In that sense, Apartheid can be regarded as the father of Federation". The Commons approved the conferences' proposals on 24 March 1953, and in April passed motions in favour of federating the territories of Northern Rhodesia and Nyasaland. A referendum was held in Southern Rhodesia on 9 April. Following the insistence and reassurances of the Southern Rhodesian prime minister, Sir Godfrey Huggins, a little more than 25,000 white Southern Rhodesians voted in the referendum for a federal government, versus nearly 15,000 against. A majority of Afrikaners and black Africans in all three territories were resolutely against it. The Federation came into being when the Parliament of the United Kingdom enacted the Rhodesia and Nyasaland Federation Act, 1953. The Act authorised the Queen, by way of an Order in Council, to provide for the federation of the three constituent territories. This order was made on 1 August 1953, bringing certain provisions of the Constitution into operation. The first Governor-General, Lord Llewellin, assumed office on 4 September. On 23 October 1953, Llewellin issued a proclamation bringing the remainder of the provisions of the Constitution into operation.

=== Constitution ===
The semi-independent federation was finally established, with five branches of government: one Federal, three Territorial, and one British. This often translated into confusion and jurisdictional rivalry among various levels of government. According to Lord Blake, it proved to be "one of the most elaborately governed countries in the world."

The Constitution provided for a federal government with enumerated powers, consisting of an executive government, a unicameral Federal Assembly (which included a standing committee known as the African Affairs Board), and a Supreme Court, among other authorities. Provision was made for the division of powers and duties between the federal and territorial governments. Article 97 of the Constitution empowered the Federal Assembly to amend the Constitution, which included a power to establish a second legislative chamber. The Governor-General would be the representative of the Queen in the Federation. Federal authority extended only to those powers assigned to the federal government and to matters incidental to them. The enumerated federal powers were divided into a "Federal Legislative List" for which the federal legislature could make laws, and a "Concurrent Legislative List" for which both the federal and territorial legislatures could make law. Federal laws prevailed over territorial laws in all cases where the federal legislature was empowered to legislate, including the concurrent list.

The executive government consisted of the Governor-General, who would represent the Queen, an Executive Council consisting of the prime minister and nine other ministers appointed by the Governor-General on recommendation from the Prime Minister, and a Cabinet of ministers appointed by the Prime Minister. The judiciary consisted of a Supreme Court, later regulated by the Federal Supreme Court Act, 1955, which consisted of the Chief Justice, two federal justices, and the chief justices of each of the three constituent territories of the Federation. The court was inaugurated on 1 July 1955, when the Governor-General swore in the Chief Justice and the other judges. The ceremony was also attended by the Lord High Chancellor and the Chief Justice of the Union of South Africa. The Chief Justices were Sir Robert Tredgold, previously Chief Justice of Southern Rhodesia, who was Chief Justice of the Federation from 1953 to 1961, and Sir John Clayden, from 1961 to 1963. The Supreme Court's jurisdiction was limited chiefly to hearing appeals from the high courts of the constituent territories. The court, however, had original jurisdiction over the following:

- Disputes between the federal government and territorial governments, or between territorial governments inter se, if such disputes involved questions (of law or fact) on which the existence or extent of a legal right depended;
- Matters affecting vacancies in the Federal Assembly and election petitions; and
- Matters in which a writ or order of mandamus, or prohibition or an injunction, is sought against an officer or authority of the federal government.

In 1958, the Prime Minister established an Office of Race Affairs which reviewed policies, practices and activities which may have hampered or adversely affected a climate favourable to the federal government's equal "partnership" policy. On 1 April 1959, the Prime Minister appointed the Parliamentary Secretary to the Ministry of Home Affairs, who held the status of a full minister, to assume responsibility for racial affairs.

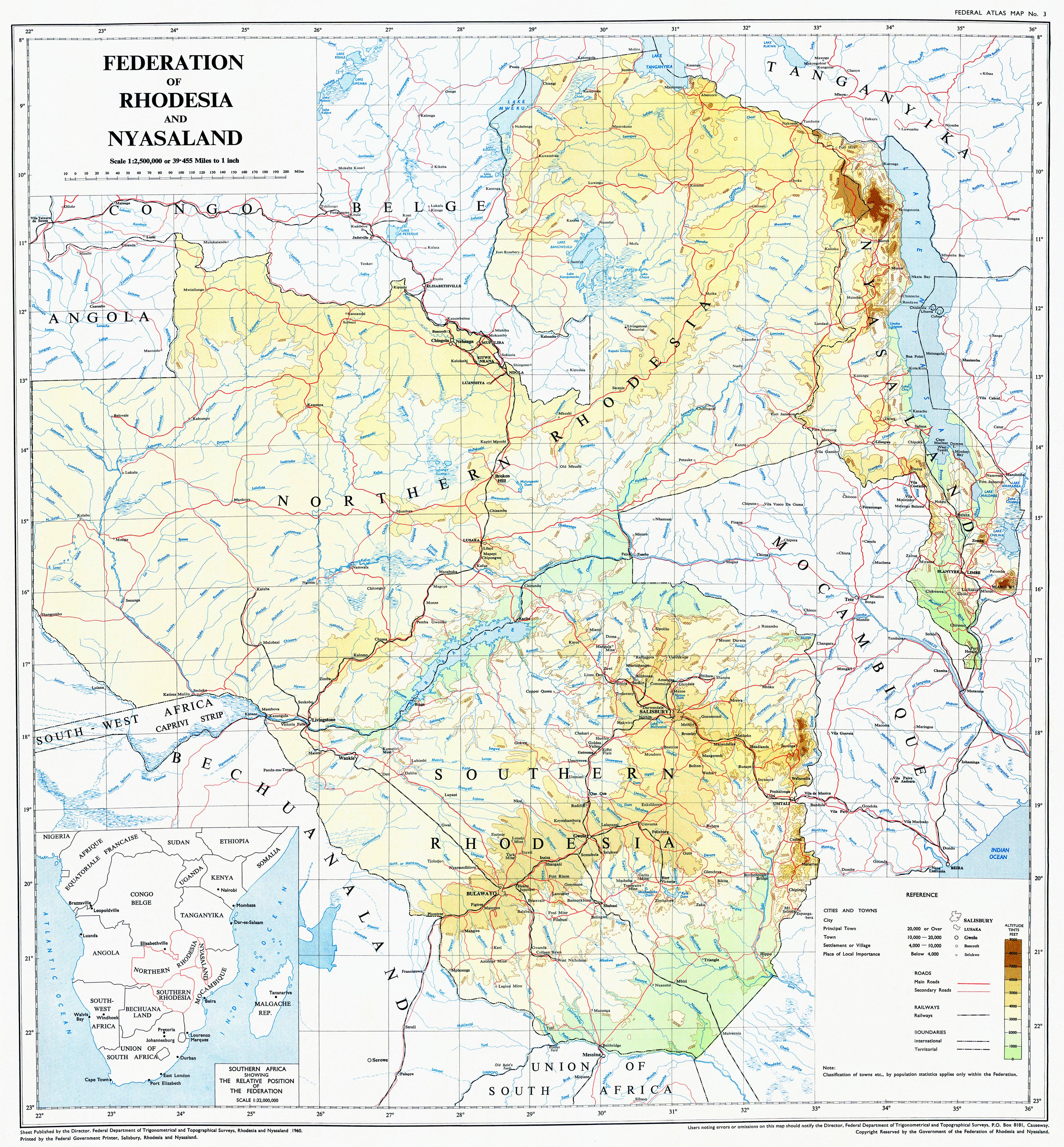
A map of the Federation, with the Southern Rhodesian capital of Salisbury doubled as the federal capital

It was commonly understood that Southern Rhodesia would be the dominant territory in the federation – economically, electorally, and militarily. How much so defined much of the lengthy constitutional negotiations and modifications that followed. African political opposition and nationalist aspirations, for the time, were moot.

Decisive factors in both the creation and dissolution of the Federation were the significant difference between the number of Africans and Europeans in the Federation, and the difference between the number of Europeans in Southern Rhodesia compared to the Northern Protectorates. Compounding this was the significant growth in Southern Rhodesia's European settler population (overwhelmingly British migrants), unlike in the Northern Protectorates. This was to greatly shape future developments in the Federation. In 1939, approximately 60,000 Europeans resided in Southern Rhodesia; shortly before the Federation was established there were 135,000; by the time the Federation was dissolved they had reached 223,000 (though newcomers could only vote after three years of residency). Nyasaland showed the least European and greatest African population growth. The dominant role played by the Southern Rhodesian European population within the CAF is reflected in that played by its first leader, Sir Godfrey Huggins (created Viscount Malvern in February 1955), Prime Minister of the Federation for its first three years and, before that, Prime Minister of Southern Rhodesia for an uninterrupted 23 years. Huggins resigned the premiership of Southern Rhodesia to take office as the federal prime minister, and was joined by most United Rhodesia Party cabinet members. There was a marked exodus to the more prestigious realm of federal politics. The position of Prime Minister of Southern Rhodesia was once again, as under Britain's Ministerial Titles Act of 1933, reduced to a Premier and taken by The Rev. Garfield Todd, the soon-to-be controversial centre-left politician. It was considered that Todd's position and territorial politics in general had become relatively unimportant, a place for the less ambitious politician. In fact, it was to prove decisive both to the future demise of the CAF, and to the later rise of the Rhodesian Front.

Rather than a federation, Prime Minister Huggins favoured an amalgamation, creating a unitary state. However, after the Second World War, Britain opposed this because Southern Rhodesia would dominate the property and income franchise (which excluded the vast majority of Africans) owing to its much larger European population. A federation was intended to curtail this. Huggins was thus the first prime minister from 1953 to 1956, and was followed by Sir Roy Welensky, a prominent Northern Rhodesian politician, from 1956 to the Federation's dissolution in December 1963.

The fate of the Federation was contested within the British Government by two principal Ministries of the Crown in deep ideological, personal and professional rivalry – the Colonial Office (CO) and the Commonwealth Relations Office (CRO) (and previously with it the Dominion Office, abolished in 1947). The CO ruled the northern territories of Nyasaland and Northern Rhodesia, while the CRO was formally but indirectly in charge of Southern Rhodesia. The northern territories opposed a Southern Rhodesian hegemony, one that the CRO promoted. Significantly, the CO tended to be more sympathetic to African rights than the CRO, which tended to promote the interests of the Southern Rhodesian (and to a lesser extent, Northern Rhodesian) European settler populations. In 1957, this led to calls by Welensky for the creation of a single department with responsibility for all three territories, with Macmillan also favouring the CRO assuming sole responsibility for them, but was persuaded by the Cabinet Secretary that this would face opposition from both Africans and members of the colonial service in the northern territories. Consequently, in 1962, the Federation's affairs were transferred to a new department, known as the Central Africa Office, with Rab Butler the minister responsible. However, this was to be short lived, as following the succession of Macmillan as prime minister by Alec Douglas-Home, responsibility for the Federation was returned to the CRO and CO, with Duncan Sandys responsible for both.

It was convenient to have all three territories colonised by Cecil Rhodes under one constitution. But, for Huggins and the Rhodesian establishment, the central economic motive behind the CAF (or amalgamation) was the abundant copper deposits of Northern Rhodesia. Unlike the Rhodesias, Nyasaland had no sizeable deposits of minerals and its tiny community of Europeans, largely Scottish, was relatively sympathetic to African aspirations. Its inclusion in the Federation was more a symbolic gesture than a practical necessity. This inclusion would eventually work against the CAF: Nyasaland and its African population was where the impetus for destabilisation of the CAF arose, leading to its dissolution.

Numbers of white and black inhabitants before and during the CAF
Year	Southern Rhodesia		Northern Rhodesia		Nyasaland		Total	
Year	White	Black	White	Black	White	Black	White	Black
1927	38,200 (3.98%)	922,000 (96.02%)	4,000 (0.4%)	1,000,000 (99.6%)	1,700 (0.13%)	1,350,000 (99.87%)	43,900 (1.32%)	3,272,000 (98.68%)
1946	80,500 (4.79%)	1,600,000 (95.21%)	21,919 (1.32%)	1,634,980 (97.68%)	2,300 (0.10%)	2,340,000 (99.90%)	104,719 (1.84%)	5,574,980 (98.16%)
1955	125,000 (4.95%)	2,400,000 (95.05%)	65,000 (3.02%)	2,085,000 (96.98%)	6,300 (0.25%)	2,550,000 (99.75%)	196,300 (2.71%)	7,035,000 (97.28%)
1960	223,000 (7.30%)	2,830,000 (92.70%)	76,000 (3.14%)	2,340,000 (96.85%)	9,300 (0.33%)	2,810,000 (99.66%)	308,300 (3.72%)	7,980,000 (96.28%)

== Economic growth and political liberalism ==
Federation five-pound note (1961)

Despite its convoluted government structure, the CAF economy was a success. In the first year of the federation, its GDP was £350 million; two years later it was nearly £450 million. Yet the average income of a European remained approximately ten times that of an African employed in the cash economy, representing only one third of local Africans.

In 1955, the creation of the Kariba hydro-electric power station was announced. It was a remarkable feat of engineering creating the largest man-made dam on the planet at the time and costing £78 million. Its location highlighted the rivalry among Southern and Northern Rhodesia, with the former attaining its favoured location for the dam.

The CAF brought a decade of liberalism with respect to African rights. There were African junior ministers in the Southern Rhodesia-dominated CAF, while a decade earlier only 70 Africans qualified to vote in the Southern Rhodesian elections.

The property and income-qualified franchise of the CAF was, therefore, now much looser. While this troubled many whites, they continued to follow Huggins with the CAF's current structure, largely owing to the economic growth. But to Africans, this increasingly proved unsatisfactory and their leaders began to voice demands for majority rule.

== Rise of African nationalism ==
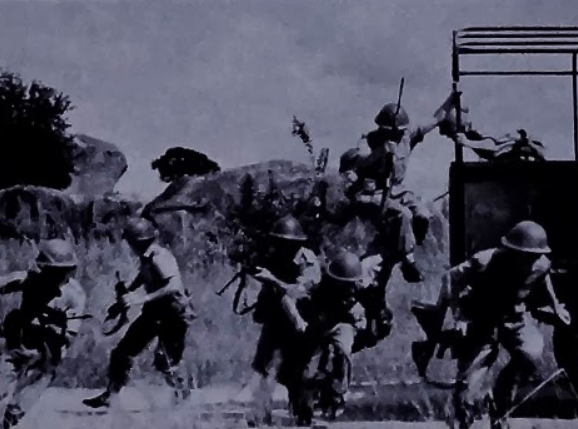
Troops of the CAF's Rhodesian Light Infantry training in 1963

African dissent in the CAF grew, and at the same time British Government circles expressed objections to its structure and purpose – full Commonwealth membership leading to independence as a dominion.

In June 1956, Northern Rhodesia's Governor, Sir Arthur Benson, wrote a highly confidential letter heavily criticising the federation in general (and the new constitution planned for it) and Federal Prime Minister, Roy Welensky, in particular. Nearly two years later, Godfrey Huggins somehow obtained a copy of it and disclosed its contents to Welensky.

Relations between Whitehall and the CAF cabinet were never to recover. These events, for the first time, brought the attention of British Conservative Prime Minister, Harold Macmillan, to a crisis emerging in the CAF, but apparently he did not fully comprehend the gravity of the situation, attributing the row to the old CO-CRO rivalry and to Welensky taking personal offence to the letter's contents.

The issues of this specific row were in the immediate sense resolved quietly with some constitutional amendments, but it is now known that Welensky was seriously considering contingencies for a Unilateral Declaration of Independence (UDI) for the federation, though he ended up opting against it.

Meanwhile, towards the end of the decade, in the Northern Territories, Africans protested against the white minority rule of the CAF. In July 1958, Hastings Banda, the leader of the Nyasaland African Congress (NAC) (later Malawi Congress Party), returned from Great Britain to Nyasaland, and in October Kenneth Kaunda became the leader of the Zambian African National Congress (ZANC), a split from the Northern Rhodesian ANC. The increasingly rattled CAF authorities banned ZANC in March 1959, and in June imprisoned Kaunda for nine months. While Kaunda was in jail, his loyal lieutenant Mainza Chona worked with other African nationalists to create the United National Independence Party (UNIP), a successor to ZANC. In early 1959, unrest broke out in Nyasaland, which, according to historian Lord Blake, was "economically the poorest, politically the most advanced and numerically the least Europeanized of the three Territories."

The CAF government declared a state of emergency. Banda and the rest of Nyasaland's NAC leadership were arrested and their party outlawed. Southern Rhodesian troops were deployed to bring order. The controversial British Labour MP John Stonehouse was expelled from Southern Rhodesia shortly before the state of emergency was proclaimed in Nyasaland, which outraged the British Labour Party.

The affair drew the whole concept of the federation into question and even UK Prime Minister Macmillan began to express misgivings about its political viability, although economically he felt it was sound. A Royal Commission to advise Macmillan on the future of the CAF, to be led by Walter Monckton, QC, the former Paymaster General, was in the works. The Commonwealth Secretary, Alec Douglas-Home, was sent to prepare Prime Minister Welensky, who was distinctly displeased about the arrival of the commission.

Welensky found Lord Home in support of the existence of the CAF. By contrast, Colonial Secretary Iain Macleod, a rival of Lord Home's and a fellow Scot, favoured African rights and dissolving the federation. Although Macmillan at the time supported Lord Home, the changes were already on the horizon. In Britain, Macmillan said that it was essential "to keep the Tory party on modern and progressive lines", noting electoral developments and especially the rise of the Labour Party.

== Dissolution ==
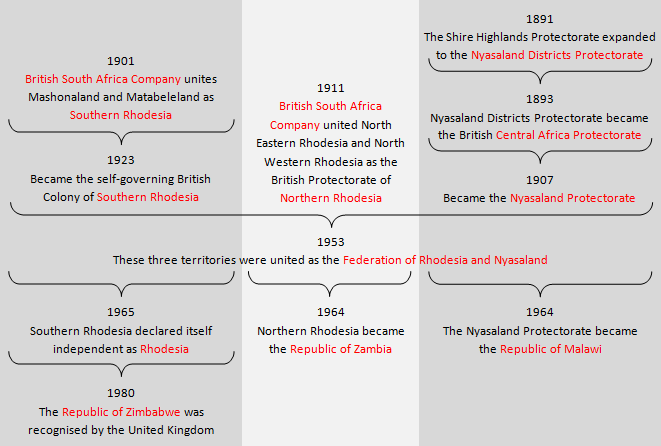
Evolution of the Federation of Rhodesia and Nyasaland

By the time Macmillan went on his famous 1960 African tour leading to his Wind of Change speech to Parliament in Cape Town, change was well underway. By 1960, French African colonies had already become independent. Belgium more hastily vacated its colony and thousands of European refugees fled the Congo from the brutalities of the civil war and into Rhodesia.

During the Congolese crisis, Africans increasingly viewed Welensky as an arch-reactionary and his support for Katanga separatism added to this. Welensky was disliked by the right and the left, though: a few years later, in his by-election campaign against Ian Smith's Rhodesian Front, RF supporters heckled the comparatively moderate Welensky as a 'bloody Jew', 'Communist', 'traitor' and 'coward'. The murder of Lilian Burton further aggrieved white settlers, 2000 of whom, with government ministers present, voted to take up arms.

The new Commonwealth Secretary, Duncan Sandys, negotiated the '1961 Constitution', a new constitution for the CAF which greatly reduced Britain's powers over it: however, by 1962, the British and the CAF cabinet had agreed that Nyasaland should be allowed to secede, though Southern Rhodesian Premier Sir Edgar Whitehead committed the British to keep this secret until after the 1962 elections in the territory. A year later, the same status was given to Northern Rhodesia, decisively ending the Federation of Rhodesia and Nyasaland in the immediate future.

In 1963, the Victoria Falls Conference was held, partly as a last effort to save the CAF, and partly as a forum to dissolve it. On 5 June 1963, the leaders of Kenya, Tanganyika, and Uganda expressed their intention to unite as the federation of East Africa. By late June 1963, a federation was nearly seen as inevitable, but within months the prospect of creating a federation dissipated.

Various explanations have been offered for the failure to establish a federation, including Ugandan concerns about its own weakness within such a federation, ideological objections to plans by Kwame Nkrumah's push for a larger East African federation, the hostility of the Buganda kingdom (within Uganda) to union, tensions over the uneven distribution of benefits from economic integration, lack of clarity on the function or form of federation, a lack of popular engagement with the process, and bad timing." Scholars such as Joseph Nye and Thomas Franck wrote about the failure of the federation, with Franck characterizing it as a tragedy. All three territories had slipped into recession with the end of the federation.

On 31 December 1963, the Federation of Rhodesia and Nyasaland was formally dissolved, and its assets distributed among the territorial governments. Southern Rhodesia obtained the vast majority of these including the assets of the Federal army, to which it had overwhelmingly contributed. In July 1964, the Nyasaland Protectorate became independent as Malawi, led by Banda, and that October, Northern Rhodesia gained independence as the Republic of Zambia - being led by Kaunda.

On 11 November 1965, Southern Rhodesia's government, led by Prime Minister Ian Smith, proclaimed a Unilateral Declaration of Independence from the United Kingdom. This attracted the world's attention and created outrage in Britain.

== Military ==
The Minister of Defence was the President of the Defence Council, which consisted of military and civilian members, and considered all matters related to defence policy.

The Army, in 1960, consisted of three training formations:

- The School of Infantry, based in Gwelo, was responsible for extra-regimental training. It was organized into tactical and regimental wings, with courses ranging from command and weapons training.
- The Regular Army Depot, based in Salisbury, handled all basic training for black recruits.
- The Depot, The Royal Rhodesia Regiment, trained recruits for the Territorial Force battalions.

Corps training was handled by the Rhodesia and Nyasaland Corps of Engineers, Corps of Signals, and the Army Service Corps.

In May 1958, three installations were named after "three of the most famous soldiers in the military history of Central Africa". The RAR camp in Llewellin was named Methuen Camp after Colonel J.A. Methuen. The Zomba Cantonment was named Cobbe Barracks after Lieutenant-Colonel Alexander Cobbe. The Lusaka military area was named Stephenson Barracks after Lieutenant-Colonel A. Stephenson.

Llewellin Barracks in Bulawayo commemorated the first Governor-General of the Federation. The Battle of Tug Argan was commemorated in the name of Tug Argan Barracks in Ndola.

The Army consisted of four African battalions: the 1st and 2nd Battalion, King's African Rifles; the Northern Rhodesia Regiment; and the Rhodesian African Rifles.In 1961, the all-White 1st Battalion of the Rhodesian Light Infantry regiment was added.

The Rhodesia and Nyasaland Women's Military Air Service (known popularly as the "WAMS") was the Federation's women's auxiliary unit. In 1957 a policy change led to the unit being gradually scaled down until its work was taken over by civilian staff.

== Legacy ==
Although the Federation of Rhodesia and Nyasaland only lasted for ten years, it had an important effect on Central Africa.

Its White minority rule, where a couple of hundred thousand Europeans – primarily in Southern Rhodesia – ruled over millions of Black Africans, was largely driven by paternalistic reformism, that collided with rising African self-confidence and nationalism.

The British influenced and affiliated federation and its institutions and racial relations differed from the only other regional power, the Union of South Africa. The dissolution of the CAF highlighted the discrepancy between the independent African-led nations of Zambia and Malawi, and Southern Rhodesia (which remained ruled by a White minority government until the Internal Settlement in 1978). Southern Rhodesia soon found itself embroiled in a civil war between the Government and African nationalist and Marxist guerrillas, where as both Malawi and Zambia developed into authoritarian one-party states dictatorships and remained so up until the post-Cold War era in the mid 1990s.

Following Southern Rhodesia's Unilateral Declaration of Independence (UDI), a growing conflict emerged between two of the former CAF territories – Zambia (supporting African nationalist and Marxist guerrillas) and Southern Rhodesia (supported by South Africa and Portugal until 1974) – with much heated diplomatic rhetoric, and, at times, outright military hostility.

== Postage and revenue stamps ==
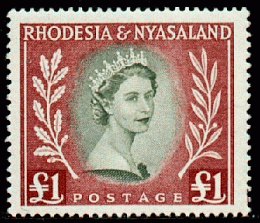
CAF issued stamp

The Federation issued its first postage stamps in 1954, all with a portrait of Queen Elizabeth II. See main article at Postage stamps of the Federation of Rhodesia and Nyasaland. Revenue stamps were also issued, see Revenue stamps of the Federation of Rhodesia and Nyasaland.

== Coins and banknotes ==
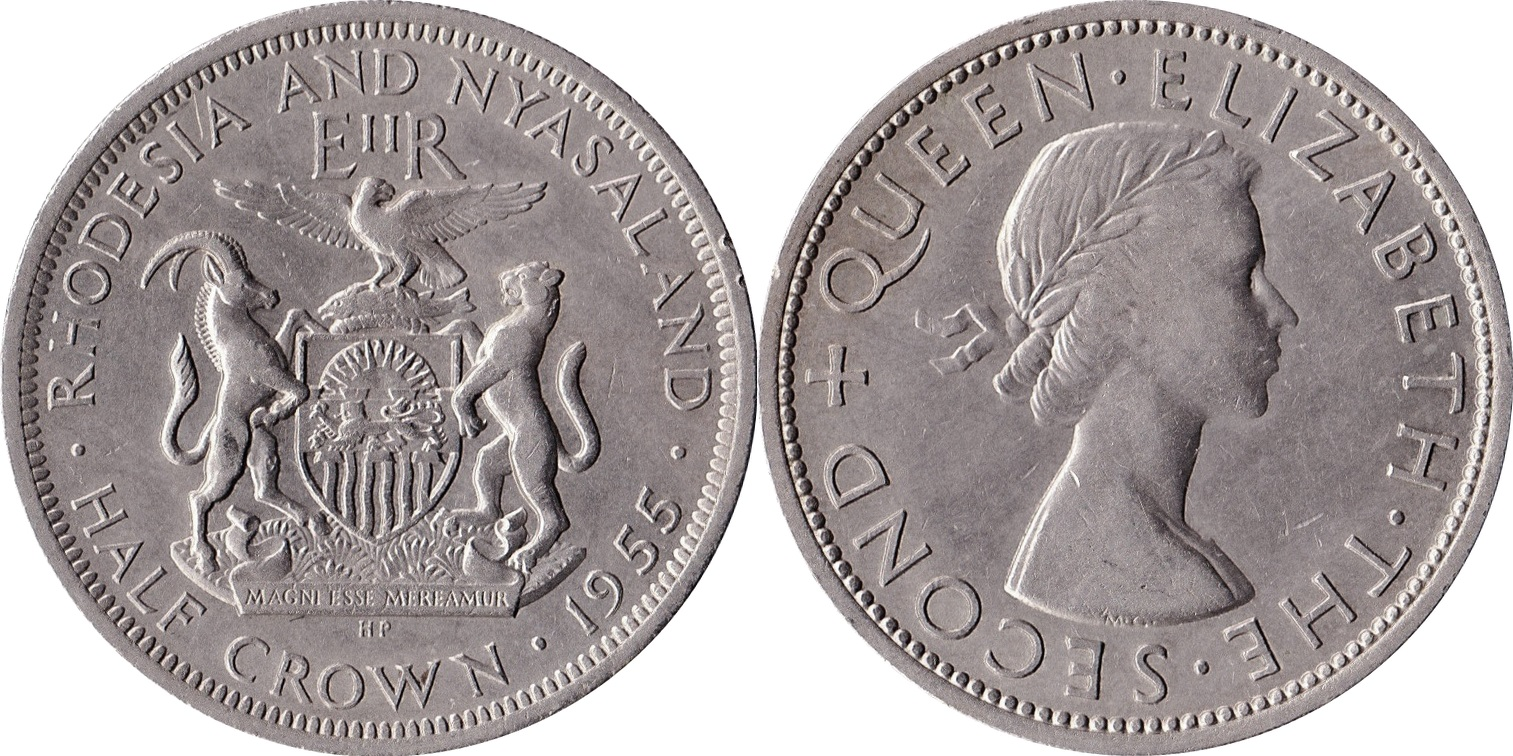

The Federation also issued its own bank notes and coinage to replace the Southern Rhodesian pound which had been circulating in all three parts of the federation. In 1955 a full new set of coins was issued with the Mary Gillick obverse of the Queen and various African animals on the reverse. The denominations followed those of sterling, namely halfpennies and pennies, which had a hole in them, threepences (known as tickeys), sixpences, shillings, a two shilling piece and a half crown. There were further full issues of all these coins in 1956 and 1957, but thereafter only pennies and half pennies were produced until some further issues of sixpences in 1962 and 1963, and threepences in 1963 and 1964. The higher denomination coins, though not particularly rare, are very popular with collectors because of their attractive reverse designs. Threepences and halfpennies were struck in 1964 despite the fact the Federation ended on 31 December 1963.

== See also ==
- 1953 Federation of Rhodesia and Nyasaland election
- 1958 Federation of Rhodesia and Nyasaland election
- 1962 Federation of Rhodesia and Nyasaland election
- Government of the Federation of Rhodesia and Nyasaland
- Bibliography of the history of Zambia § Colonial Rhodesia era
