= Timeline of the presidency of Hakainde Hichilema (2026) =

Timeline of the presidency of Hakainde Hichilema in 2026

The following is a timeline of the presidency of Hakainde Hichilema from 1 January, 2026 to date. It documents the events of the presidency of Hakainde Hichilema during 2026, his fifth year in office and final year of his first term, as well as the beginning of his second term following the 2026 general election.

== January ==
- 1 January – President Hichilema delivers his New Year's message, saying the government will "push harder" in 2026 and deliver more for Zambians.
- 7 January – Hichilema addresses supporters at the Choma Cricket Club grounds in Choma.
- 15 January – Hichilema commends political parties for conducting peaceful campaigns ahead of the Chawama by-election.
- 16 January – The President congratulates FDD candidate Bright Nundwe after he wins the Chawama by-election.
- 26 January – Hichilema meets global capital-market investors led by J.P. Morgan at State House to discuss investment opportunities in Zambia.
- 27 January – Hichilema receives letters of credence from newly accredited ambassadors and high commissioners at State House.
- 27 January – The International Monetary Fund completes the sixth and final review of Zambia's Extended Credit Facility programme, approving an immediate disbursement of about US$190 million.
- 28 January – Hichilema witnesses the signing of a memorandum of understanding for the development of up to 1,000 MW of solar power projects in Zambia.
- 29 January – Hichilema hosts the Presidential Annual Greeting of the Diplomatic Corps at the Mulungushi International Conference Centre.

== February ==
- 2 February – Hichilema chairs the first Cabinet meeting of 2026 at State House, which approves several bills and policy measures.
- 4 February – Hichilema receives Ghanaian President John Dramani Mahama at Kenneth Kaunda International Airport at the start of Mahama's three-day state visit to Zambia.
- 5 February – Hichilema holds bilateral talks with Mahama at State House. The two presidents witness the signing of 10 memoranda of understanding.
- 9 February – Hichilema delivers the keynote address at the opening ceremony of the African Mining Indaba in Cape Town, South Africa.
- 13 February – Hichilema arrives in Addis Ababa, Ethiopia, to attend the 39th Ordinary Session of the African Union Assembly.
- 14 February – Hichilema hosts a high-level dialogue on ending child marriage in Africa in Addis Ababa and launches the African Union Champion's Report on Ending Child Marriage in Africa.
- 14 February – Hichilema attends the opening of the 39th Ordinary Session of the African Union Assembly in Addis Ababa.
- 15 February – Hichilema attends high-level meetings on vaccine and therapeutic production, United Nations reform and water investment during the African Union summit in Addis Ababa.
- 16 February – Hichilema meets Zambians living in Ethiopia and encourages them to invest in Zambia.
- 17 February – Hichilema meets investors from the United Arab Emirates and calls for increased investment in Zambia.
- 18 February – Hichilema announces changes to his Cabinet.
- 19 February – Hichilema attends the requiem mass of former Cabinet minister Mutumba Mainga Bull in Lusaka.
- 20 February – Hichilema addresses the National Assembly on the progress made in applying national values and principles.
- 22 February – Hichilema makes a working visit to the Copperbelt Province, attending Mass at St Joseph Parish in Chifubu, Ndola, and meeting students in Kitwe.
- 24 February – The National Assembly begins debating the Motion of Thanks on Hichilema's address on national values and principles.
- 26 February – Hichilema swears in three senior government officials at State House and tells government officials to continue working despite the approaching general election.

== March ==
- 6 March – Hichilema addresses the 2026 National Youth Indaba in Lusaka.
- 12 March – Hichilema officiates at the National Youth Day celebrations in Solwezi and launches the "Imisepela" Jobs and Opportunities mobile application.
- 12 March – Hichilema announces plans to construct a public university in Solwezi, with Chief Kapijipanga offering 50 hectares of land for the project.
- 18 March – Hichilema delivers the keynote address at the ICTAZ 2026 Tech Conference in Livingstone and is conferred as Patron of the Information and Communications Technology Association of Zambia.
- 23 March – Hichilema meets the European Union Ambassador to Zambia and a COMESA delegation at State House to discuss Zambia–EU cooperation on economic growth, peace and development.
- 28 March – Hichilema officiates at the Kuomboka traditional ceremony in Western Province.
- 30 March – Hichilema attends the 2026 National Delivery Day at the Mulungushi International Conference Centre in Lusaka and calls for a shift from government commitments to measurable delivery.
- 31 March – Hichilema unveils a provincial growth plan and calls on provinces to focus on developing their regional economies.

== April ==
- 10 April – Hichilema opens the University of Lusaka's Silverest Campus and Teaching Hospital in Chongwe District and receives an honorary Doctorate of Philosophy in Investment and Enterprise Development from the university.
- 12 April – Hichilema files his nomination papers as the UPND presidential candidate for the 2026 general election.
- 15 April – The UPND General Assembly re-elects Hichilema as party president and confirms him as the party's presidential candidate for the August general election.
- 15 April – Hichilema delivers the keynote address at the 69th Annual General Meeting and Symposium of the Engineering Institution of Zambia in Livingstone.
- 20 April – Hichilema announces an agreement with Zimbabwe to restrict heavy trucks and freight trains from using the Victoria Falls Bridge, with plans for a new road and rail crossing downstream on the Zambezi.
- 25 April – Hichilema visits Kasama, where he pays a courtesy call on Chitimukulu, opens the Kasama Mall and Urban Hotel, and holds a community meeting.
- 30 April – Hichilema officiates at the groundbreaking ceremony for shaft construction at the Mingomba copper mine in Chililabombwe.

== May ==
- 1 May – Hichilema officiates at the National Labour Day celebrations in Chinsali.
- 11–12 May – Hichilema attends the Africa Forward Summit in Nairobi, Kenya, where he participates in discussions on development finance, peace and security, and artificial intelligence.
- 22 May – Hichilema files his presidential nomination papers with the Electoral Commission of Zambia for the 2026 general election and unveils Vice-President Mutale Nalumango as his running mate.
- 23 May – Hichilema addresses the media following the close of presidential nominations and says his campaign for a second term has officially begun.

== June ==
- 4 June – Hichilema signs five bills into law covering education, pensions and local-authority superannuation.
- 12 June – Hichilema launches the UPND 2026–2031 revised manifesto at the Mulungushi International Conference Centre in Lusaka, outlining the party's seven "HH7" targets for a second term.
- 23 June – Hichilema begins his nationwide campaign for the 2026 general election, starting in Muchinga Province.
- 28 June – Hichilema holds a campaign rally outside National Heroes Stadium in Lusaka, formally launching the UPND's nationwide re-election campaign.

== July ==
July was largely focused on campaigning for the 2026 general election, with Hichilema travelling across the country and holding rallies in several provinces.

== August ==
August was dominated by the general election and the transition to Hichilema's second term.

- August 6–7 – Hichilema visits six districts in North-Western Province during a two-day working visit.
- August 13 – Zambia holds its general election, with Hichilema seeking a second presidential term.
- August 18 – The Electoral Commission of Zambia declares Hichilema the winner of the presidential election. Hichilema delivers an acceptance speech and pledges to govern all Zambians.
- 19–23 August – Hichilema begins preparations for his second-term inauguration following his re-election.
- 24 August – The seven-day deadline for filing a presidential election petition expires without a petition being recorded in the Constitutional Court Registry.
- 26–31 August – Preparations continue for Hichilema's second-term inauguration at National Heroes Stadium in Lusaka.

== September ==
- 1 September – Hichilema is sworn in for a second five-year term as President of Zambia at National Heroes Stadium in Lusaka. He and Vice-President Mutale Nalumango take their oaths of office before Chief Justice Mumba Malila. In his inaugural address, Hichilema launches the Grow Zambia agenda and pledges to serve all Zambians equally.
- 14 September – Hichilema appoints his first four members of his second cabinet, with Situmbeko Musokotwane reappointed as Minister of Finance and National Planning, Mulambo Haimbe reappointed as Minister of Foreign Affairs and International Cooperation, and Roma Chilengi and Gilbert Siame appointed as Minister of Health and Minister of Green Economy and Environment respectively.
- 25 September – Hichilema swores in Patricia Malaila as Deputy Auditor General – Audit Division.
- 28 September – Hichilema goes to Abu Dhabi, United Arab Emirates, ahead of a two-day working visit at the invitation of UAE President Mohamed bin Zayed Al Nahyan.

== October ==
- 1 October – Hichilema returned to Zambia from the United Arab Emirates, following a two-day working visit during which Zambia secured investment commitments worth US$2.14 billion.
- 2 October – Hichilema presided over the swearing-in of the presiding officers of the 14th National Assembly at State House. Nelly Mutti was re-elected unopposed as Speaker, while Malungo Chisangano was elected First Deputy Speaker and Nshamba Muzungu was elected Second Deputy Speaker.
- 4 October – Hichilema terminated, with immediate effect, Charity Munganga's appointment as Deputy Inspector General of Police in charge of Administration of the Zambia Police Service. Munganga had held the position since her appointment in November 2025.
- 9 October – Hichilema officially open the First Session of the Fourteenth National Assembly.

== See also ==
- Timeline of the Hakainde Hichilema presidency
