= Second inauguration of Hakainde Hichilema =

15th Zambian presidential inauguration

Second Inauguration of Hakainde Hichilema
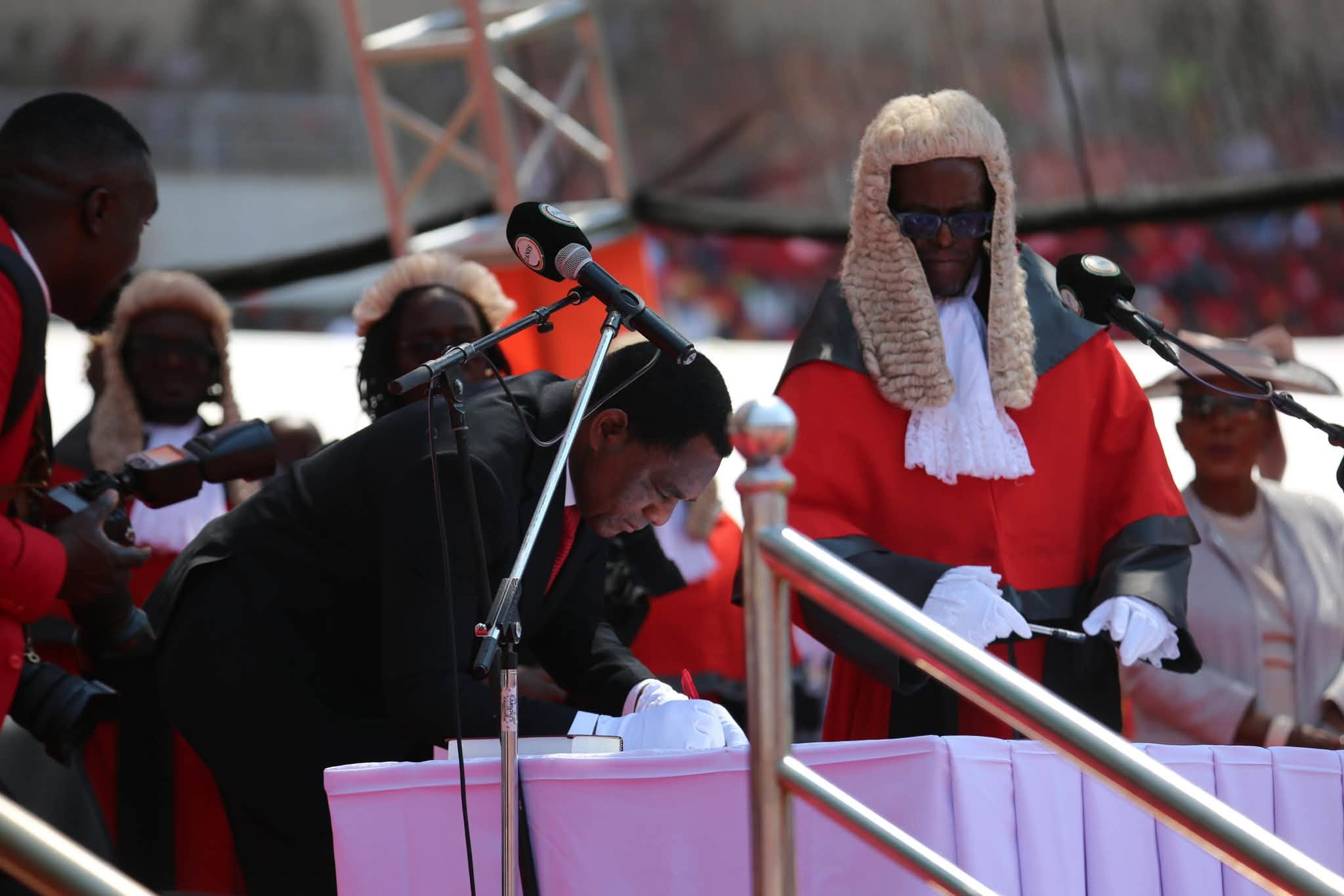
- Date: 1 September 2026
- Participants: Hakainde Hichilema 7th president of Zambia — Assumed office Mutale Nalumango; 14th vice president of Zambia — Assumed office

The second inauguration of Hakainde Hichilema, as President of Zambia, took place on 1 September 2026, when he was sworn in for his second and final term, with Mutale Nalumango continuing as Vice President of Zambia. It was the 15th presidential inauguration and the first since Levy Mwanawasa in 2006 in which an incumbent Zambian president was sworn in for a full second consecutive term after winning re-election. The ceremony was held at Heroes Stadium in Lusaka. The day of the inauguration was declared a public holiday in Zambia.

== Planning ==
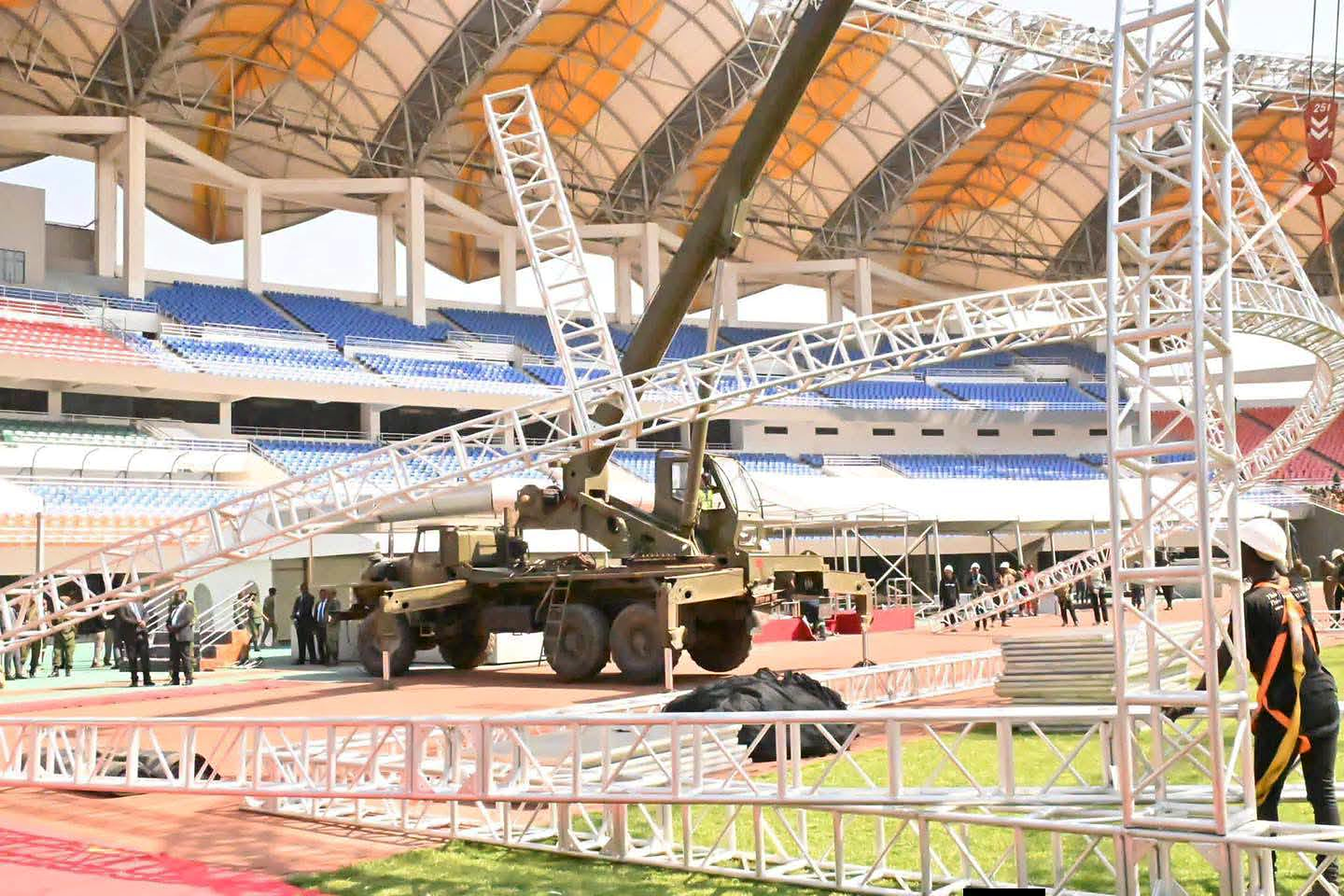
Zambia Army making the stage at Heroes Stadium.

Preparations for the inauguration were under way at National Heroes Stadium in Lusaka in August 2026. By 19 August, upgrades to the VIP facilities had been carried out, while carpeting, tiling, landscaping and plumbing works had been completed. The Ministry of Youth, Sport and Arts, Ministry of Infrastructure, Housing and Urban Development, Zambia National Service and Zambia Air Force were involved in the preparations.

Hichilema was scheduled to be sworn in on 1 September 2026, following the expiry of the period for challenging the presidential election result. Under Article 103(1) of the Constitution of Zambia, a candidate may petition the Constitutional Court within seven days of the declaration of a President-elect. Hichilema was declared the winner on 18 August, making 25 August the deadline for filing a petition.

On 25 August, Chief Justice Mumba Malila said he had received an email from a member of the public containing a document described as "the people's presidential petition", seeking to challenge Hichilema's re-election. The Judiciary described the method of submission as irregular because it had been sent to the Chief Justice's private email address. Malila referred the document to the Constitutional Court to determine whether it could constitute a valid petition. A separate statement from the Constitutional Court Registry said that no petition had been recorded as of 18:00 on 24 August.

Ahead of the inauguration, the government also outlined its priorities for Hichilema's second term. Ministry of Information and Media spokesperson Henry Kapata said the government would pursue the 10-10-5-3-3-1-1 development framework, which includes targets for electricity generation, maize, copper, soybeans and wheat production, international tourism and beef exports.

== Ceremony ==
The inauguration ceremony began at 11:00 at National Heroes Stadium in Lusaka on 1 September 2026. The programme included the arrival of invited guests, foreign dignitaries, the President-elect and Vice-President-elect, followed by the judicial procession and administration of the oaths of office by Chief Justice Mumba MalilaFollowing the swearing-in, Hichilema received a presidential salute, followed by a 21-gun salute, a flypast and an inspection of the inauguration guard of honour. Personnel from the Zambia Army, Zambia Air Force, Zambia National Service, Zambia Police Service and Zambia Correctional Service took part in the march past. Hichilema then delivered his inaugural address to the nation.

The programme also included speeches by foreign heads of state and government, followed by a closing prayer and the African Union and Zambian national anthems. The programme ended with the departure of the dignitaries and senior officials at 13:30.

=== Address ===
In his inaugural address, Hichilema announced the Grow Zambia Agenda, a five-year economic programme based on the 10-10-5-3-3-1-1-1 framework. The targets included producing 10 million tonnes of maize, generating 10,000 megawatts of electricity, attracting five million tourists, producing three million tonnes each of copper and soybeans, producing one million tonnes each of wheat and sugar, and earning US$1 billion from beef exports.

== Dignitaries ==
Several foreign dignitaries attended the inauguration. On 28 August 2026, the Chinese government confirmed that Xi Jinping, President of China, had appointed Xian Hui, Vice-Chairperson of the National Committee of the Chinese People's Political Consultative Conference, as his special envoy to attend the inauguration on his behalf. Xian Hui attended the ceremony at the invitation of the Zambian government.

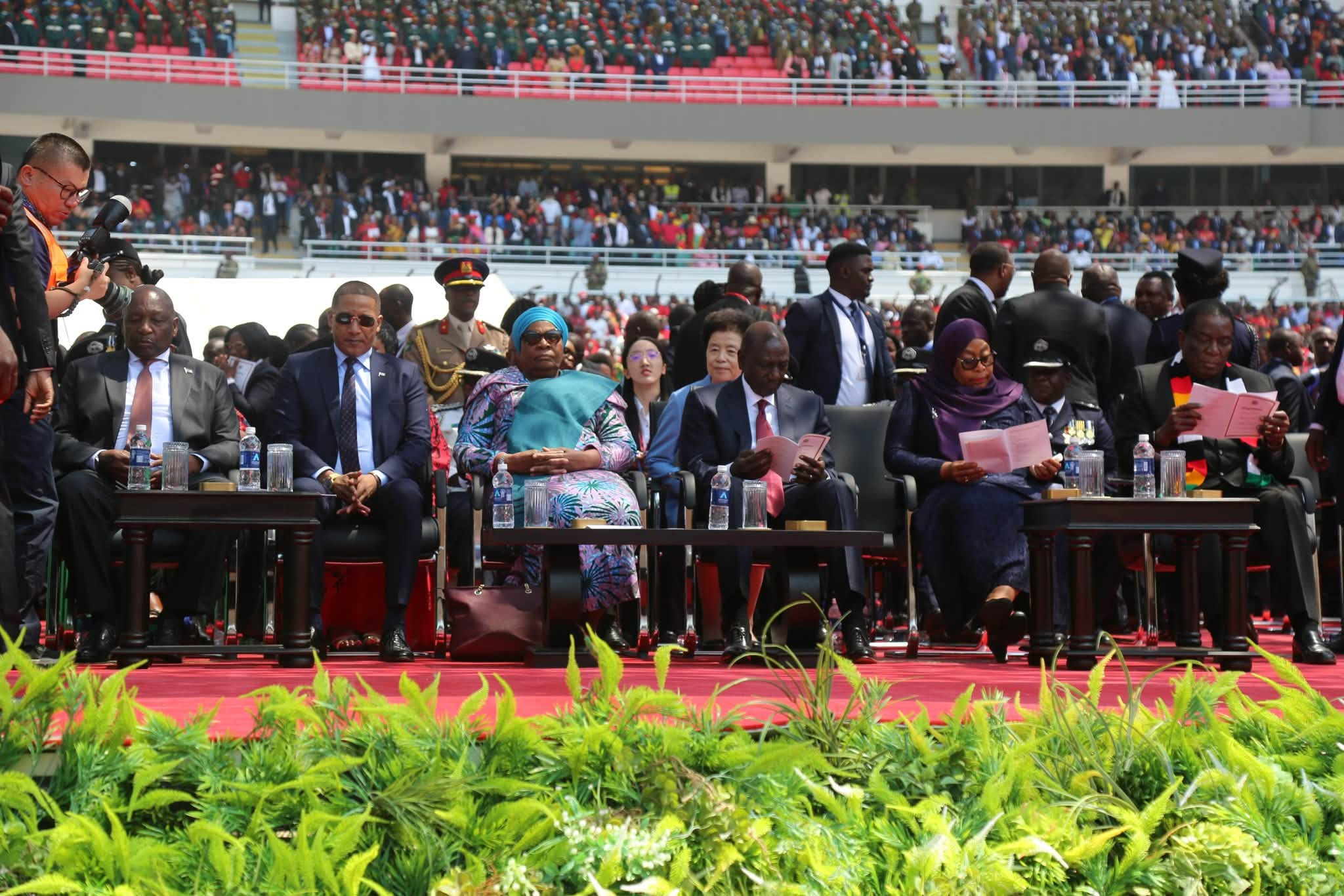
African Presidents

African leaders
Country	Title	Dignitary	ref
Botswana	President	Duma Boko	
Tanzania	President	Samia Suluhu Hassan	
Namibia	President	Netumbo Nandi-Ndaitwah	
Zimbabwe	President	Emmerson Mnangagwa	
Kenya	President	William Ruto	
Lesotho	Prime Minister	Sam Matekane	
Eswatini	Deputy Prime Minister	Thulisile Dladla	

Government representatives
Country	Representative	Position	Representing	Ref
China	Xian Hui	Vice-Chairperson of the National Committee of the CPPCC	President Xi Jinping	
America	Frank Garcia	United States Assistant Secretary of State for African Affairs	United States	
Czech Republic	Kateřina Bečková	Chargé d’Affaires a.i.	Czech Republic	

== See also ==
- First presidency of Hakainde Hichilema
- Timeline of the Hakainde Hichilema presidency
- First Inauguration of Hakainde Hichilema
- 2026 General elections
