= Lewanika and Others vs. Chiluba =

Case law in Zambia

Lewanika and Others vs. Chiluba, was a Supreme Court of Zambia case decided in 2000, in which the Court dismissed the petition and held that the amendment limiting candidates to being at least full second generation Zambians in dispute over the 1996 election did not disqualify Kenneth Kaunda from the presidency. There were also other issues concerning electoral practices.

The constitutional provision was later evoked over the legality of Guy Scott running for president in the 2015 election or even his legitimacy as acting president.

== Case ==
=== Background ===
Section 38 of the 1996 constitution of Zambia states:

If the office of the President becomes vacant by reason of his death or resignation or by reason of his ceasing to hold office by virtue of Article 36, 37 or 88, an election to the office of the President shall be held in accordance with Article 34 within ninety days from the date of the office becoming vacant. Whenever the office of the President becomes vacant, the Vice-President or, in the absence of the Vice-President or if the Vice-President is unable, by reason of physical or mental infirmity, to discharge the functions of his office, a member of the Cabinet elected by the Cabinet shall perform the functions of the office of the President until a person elected as President in accordance with Article 34 assumes office.

Section 34 of the constitution as amended in 1996 states:

A person shall be qualified to be a candidate for election as President if
(a) he is a Zambian citizen;
(b) both his parents are Zambians by birth or descent;
(c) he has attained the age of thirty-five years;
(d) he is a member of, or is sponsored by, a political party;
(e) he is qualified to be elected as a member of the National Assembly; and
(f) has been domiciled in Zambia for a period of at least twenty years.

=== Court ruling ===
The court ruled that the Constitution should be construed as referring to "those who became Zambian citizens at independence or would, but for their prior deaths, have then become Zambian citizens". That is, Zambian citizenship was only created on 24 October 1964 and so it was unnecessary to determine the birthplace of Kaunda or his father as they would have become citizens on that date.

== Implications ==
The constitutional provision was later evoked over the legality of Guy Scott running for president in the 2015 election or even his legitimacy as acting president. It was cited as important following the death of President Michael Sata, which made Scott the first white African president in a black-majority state since former State President of South Africa F. W. de Klerk.
