= Timeline of the Hakainde Hichilema presidency =

Timeline of the presidency of Hakainde Hichilema

Hakainde Hichilema, a UPND politician from Zambia, was elected President of Zambia on 12 August 2021 and was inaugurated as the country's seventh president on 24 August 2021. He was re-elected on 13 August 2026, and his second inauguration was held on 1 September 2026. The following is a timeline of his presidency from 2021 to the present.

== Presidency ==
=== 2021 ===
Hichilema began his presidency on 24 August 2021 after defeating incumbent Edgar Lungu in the 2021 Zambian general election. His government took office amid a debt crisis following Zambia's 2020 sovereign debt default. During his first months in office, the government began negotiations with the International Monetary Fund and international creditors, while Hichilema appointed his cabinet and began changes to the public service and state institutions.

=== 2022 ===
The government continued its efforts to restructure Zambia's debt and stabilize the economy. Hichilema's administration also pursued investment in the mining sector and strengthened relations with international and regional partners. Zambia signed an agreement with the Democratic Republic of the Congo to develop an electric battery value chain, while the government continued work on infrastructure and other economic projects.

=== 2023 ===
Hichilema's government continued implementing its economic and governance programme, with debt restructuring remaining a major issue. The government also pursued investment in mining, energy and infrastructure and continued efforts to attract foreign investment. Political and economic debates during the year included the government's handling of the economy, public finances and relations with opposition parties.

=== 2024 ===
The government continued its economic reform programme while Zambia faced challenges including drought and electricity shortages. The administration also continued efforts to attract investment in the mining and energy sectors and pursued reforms in public institutions. Political tensions remained between the government and opposition parties.

=== 2025 ===
Hichilema's government continued its economic and infrastructure programmes while preparing for the 2026 Zambian general election. Major issues during the year included economic recovery, energy supply, mining investment and constitutional reform. The death of former president Edgar Lungu in June led to a period of national mourning and political and legal disputes surrounding his funeral and burial.

=== 2026 ===
The year marked the end of Hichilema's first term and his re-election to a second term in the 2026 Zambian general election. He was declared the winner by the Electoral Commission of Zambia and was inaugurated for a second term on 1 September 2026.

== See also ==
- First inauguration of Hakainde Hichilema
- Second inauguration of Hakainde Hichilema
- Presidency of Hakainde Hichilema
- 2021 Zambian general election
- 2026 Zambian general election
