= Esau Chulu =

Zambian judge

The Honorable Justice Esau E. Chulu

Chairperson of the Electoral Commission of Zambia
- In office 2015–Present
- Preceded by: Irene Mambilima

Esau Chulu (born) is a Zambian judge who has served as the chairperson of the Electoral Commission of Zambia since 2015.

== Education ==
Justice Chulu holds a Bachelor of Laws Degree (LLB) from the University of Zambia and a Masters in Law (LLM) from the London School of Economics and Political Science.

== Career ==
=== Zambian Justice System ===
Justice Chulu has previously served as an Advocate to the High Court and Supreme Court of Zambia, a Judge in Charge of both Commercial and General Lists at the High Court, a Lusaka Member of the Editorial Board of Council of Law Reporting, the Chairperson of the Bar/Bench Committee, the Chairperson of the Legal Aid Board, and the Chief Legal Counsel for Zambia Consolidated Copper Mines Ltd (ZCCM). Chulu has also served as Lecturer in Professional Conduct and Ethics at the Zambia Institute of Advanced Legal Education (ZIALE).

=== Electoral Commission of Zambia and Other ===
Justice Chulu was appointed as a Commissioner of the Electoral Commission of Zambia (ECZ) in December of 2009 by former Zambian president Rupiah Banda. The ECZ mission statement is to "effectively manage the electoral process to deliver credible elections."

In 2015, Justice Chulu was appointed as Chairperson of the committee by former Zambian president Edgar Lungu. This decision was met with both political and popular support. Movement for Multi-Party Democracy President Nevers Mumba, Foundation for Democratic Process executive director McDonald Chipenzi, United Party for National Development spokesperson Charles Kakoma, and Southern African Center for the Constructive Resolution of Disputes executive director Boniface Cheembe publicly supported Justice Chulu's appointment. Justice Chulu replaced previous chairperson Irene Mambilima, who was appointed Chief Justice. Former president Lungu also appointed two commissioners to serve with Justice Chulu: Women for Change executive director Emily Sikazwe and Pemba member of Parliament (MP) David Matongo.

As Chairperson of the Electoral Commission of Zambia, Justice Chulu presided over the 2016 and 2021 Zambian general elections. International election observers commended the transparent and peaceful polls, but criticized the lack of freedom of assembly and movement.

Justice Chulu is also a member of the Commonwealth Magistrates and Judges Association (CMJA).
