= Ministry of Infrastructure Development =

Ministry of Infrastructure Development may refer to:

- Ministry of Infrastructure Development (Nepal)
- Ministry of Infrastructure and Development (Poland)
- Ministry of Infrastructure Development (Solomon Islands)
- Ministry of Infrastructure Development (Tanzania)

== See also ==
- Ministry of Development (disambiguation)
- Ministry of Infrastructure (disambiguation)
- Ministry of Infrastructure and Regional Development (Moldova)
- Ministry of Infrastructure, Housing and Urban Development (disambiguation)
- Ministry of Urban Development (disambiguation)
