= Inauguration of Hakainde Hichilema =

Inauguration of Hakainde Hichilema may refer to:

- First inauguration of Hakainde Hichilema, 2021
- Second inauguration of Hakainde Hichilema, 2026
