= Ministry of Infrastructure, Housing and Urban Development =

Ministry of Infrastructure, Housing and Urban Development may refer to:

- Ministry of Infrastructure, Housing and Urban Development (Maldives)
- Ministry of Infrastructure, Housing and Urban Development (Zambia)

== See also ==
- Minister of Infrastructure (disambiguation)
- Ministry of Infrastructure (disambiguation)
- Housing minister
- Ministry of Urban Development (disambiguation)
