= 2015 Zambian presidential election =

- 20 January 2015
- Registered: 5,166,084
- Turnout: 32.02% (▼20.87 pp)
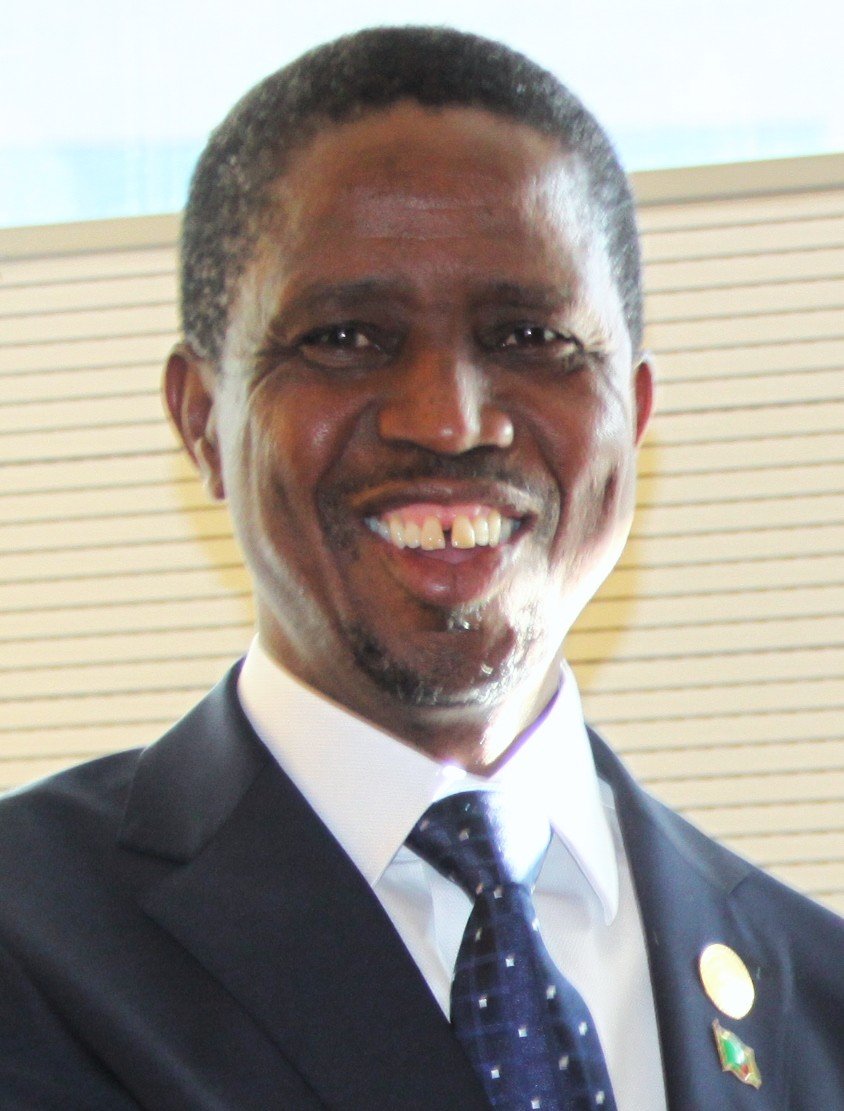

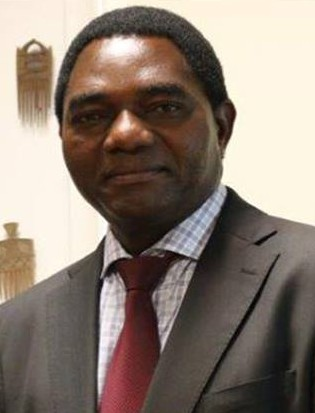
Nominee	Edgar Lungu	Hakainde Hichilema
Party	PF	UPND
Popular vote	807,925	780,168
Percentage	48.84%	47.16%
- Results by National Assembly constituency
President before election
Guy Scott (acting)
PF
Elected President
Edgar Lungu
PF

Presidential elections were held in Zambia on 20 January 2015 to elect a president to serve the remainder of the term of President Michael Sata, following his death on 28 October 2014.

The ruling Patriotic Front candidate Edgar Lungu won by a narrow majority of just 27,757 votes (1.68%) against Hakainde Hichilema of the United Party for National Development. Hichilema denounced the elections as a sham and urged his supporters to remain calm.

== Background ==
Prior to Sata's death, his ill-health led to political commentators speculating about potential Patriotic Front candidates. Following his death on 28 October, Vice-president Guy Scott became acting president and became the first white head of state on the African continent since Apartheid-era South Africa's F. W. de Klerk.

The constitution required that elections be held within 90 days of the death of an incumbent president. On 18 November, Scott announced the election date, which also launched the campaigning period.

== Candidates ==
On 27 February 2014, the Opposition Alliance was formed to field a common candidate in the 2016 elections. The alliance consisted of the Movement for Multi-Party Democracy (MMD), the Alliance for Better Zambia, Zambians for Empowerment and Development, the People's Party, and the All People's Congress Party. However, following the death of President Sata and the calling of early elections, however, MMD Deputy National Secretary Chembe Nyangu expressed doubts about whether the alliance would work given the short time period to agree on a candidate.

=== Patriotic Front ===
==== Announced ====
- Selemani Pangula Banda, Diplomat, former Airforce Captain and former Zambian High Commissioner to Nigeria.
- Chishimba Kambwili, Minister of Sports.
- Christine Kaseba, MD, gynaecologist, obstetrician and widow of President Michael Sata.
- Edgar Lungu, lawyer, Minister of Defence and Justice and former Secretary General of PF.
- Given Lubinda, MP, former Minister of Foreign Affairs and Secretary General of PF.
- Geoffrey Bwalya Mwamba ("GBM"), businessman, former Minister of Defence.
- Miles Sampa, Commerce Deputy Minister, Matero MP and nephew of Michael Sata.
- Robert Sichinga, Commerce Minister.
- Wylbur Simuusa, Minister of Agriculture

==== Withdrawn ====
- Mulenga Sata, son of Michael Sata and Mayor of Lusaka.

Vice-president Scott, who was serving as acting president following Sata's death, announced that he would not contest the elections, claiming he was constitutionally barred from doing so. However, although the constitution restricts candidacy to at least third generation Zambians, the Zambian Supreme Court ruled in Lewanika and Others vs. Chiluba that this is not relevant to citizens born before independence in 1964.

==== Selection ====
At a General Conference at the Mulungushi Rock of Authority during the weekend of 29–30 November Edgar Lungu was selected as the party president and presidential candidate by default, as none of the other candidates were present. However, as the meeting did not follow procedure and included unauthorised delegates, party president Scott called the elections "null and void" and chaired an alternative General Conference at Mulungushi University on 1 December, which saw Miles Sampa chosen as the party's presidential candidate with an overwhelming majority. The Lungu faction had previously obtained an injunction from the High Court against this Conference and denied the legitimacy of Sampa's selection. Three candidates—Kambwili, Simuusa and Lubinda—withdrew from the Conference before the vote, citing distrust of the legitimacy of the delegates present and a wish not to divide the party.

=== Movement for Multi-Party Democracy ===
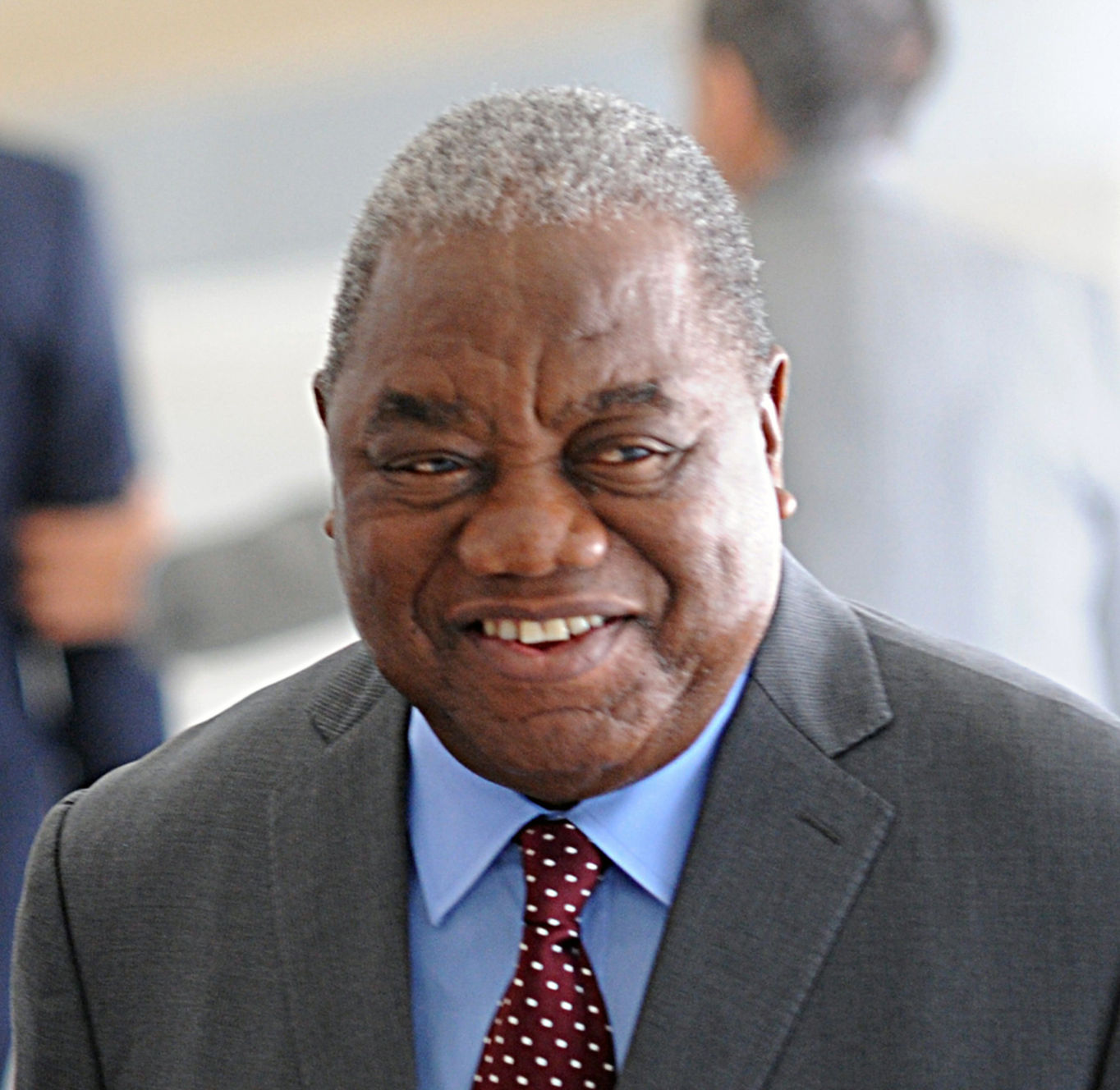
Former President Rupiah Banda

- Rupiah Banda, former President of Zambia.
- Nevers Mumba, minister and former televangelist, MMD President.

As president of the MMD, Mumba declared himself the party's candidate for the presidency. However, following former President Banda's interest in seeking the presidency, the MMD National Executive Committee, 38 of the 55 members being present, unanimously voted to suspend Mumba from the party presidency and adopt Banda as its presidential candidate. Following this meeting on 18 November 2014, MMD national secretary Muhabi Lungu stated that Mumba had disregarded party organs, namely the NEC, and committed gross misconduct. Mumba contested this decision, stating that he was the legitimately elected leader of the party and was not elected to keep the seat warm for President Banda's future candidacy.

Mumba sought an injunction against Lungu, seeking to restrain Lungu from interfering with the running of Mumba's office and functions of the party president. On 11 December the Lusaka High Court dismissed an interim injunction granted to Mumba on 25 November, with High Court Judge Chalwe Mchenga stating that Mumba failed to specify what Lungu should be precluded from doing and that Lungu cannot be held responsible for failing to comply with an unclear injunction.

On appeal, the Supreme Court reversed and ruled on 18 December that the official candidate for the MMD was Nevers Mumba. In an opinion read by Supreme Court Justice Mumba Malila, the Court reasoned that Judge Mchenga erred when ruling and failed to consider evidence submitted to the Court by Mumba that sufficiently showed the parameters of the injunction that the High Court had stated were unclear. A week later, Banda released a statement in which he thanked his supporters, but told them to respect the Supreme Court's decision. Mumba subsequently expelled Muhabi Lungu and vice secretary Chembe Nyangu from their positions for insubordination.

=== United Party for National Development ===
The UPND's National Management Committee unanimously agreed to field party leader and prior presidential candidate Hakainde Hichilema on 14 November 2014. Hichilema also received the support of Charles Milupi and the Alliance for Democracy and Development on 25 November.

=== Minor party candidates ===
- Tilyenji Kaunda (United National Independence Party), son to the former President Kenneth Kaunda.
- Godfrey Miyanda (Heritage Party), retired major general, former vice-president.
- Edith Nawakwi (Forum for Democracy and Development), former Energy and Finance Minister.
- Peter Sinkamba (Green Party of Zambia)
- Daniel Pule (Christian Democratic Party), Church Apostle, former Deputy Minister.
- Elias Chipimo Jr (National Restoration Party), former Corporate Lawyer.
- Ludwig Sondashi (Forum for Democratic Alternatives), former Works and Supply Minister.

== Results ==
Lungu won by a narrow plurality of just 27,757 votes (1.68%). Hichilema denounced the elections as a sham and urged his supporters to remain calm and prepare for the next general elections in 2016.

Candidate	Party	Votes	%
Edgar Lungu	Patriotic Front	807,925	48.84
Hakainde Hichilema	United Party for National Development	780,168	47.16
Edith Nawakwi	Forum for Democracy and Development	15,321	0.93
Nevers Mumba	Movement for Multi-Party Democracy	14,609	0.88
Tilyenji Kaunda	United National Independence Party	9,737	0.59
Eric Chanda	Fourth Revolution Party	8,054	0.49
Elias Chipimo Jr	National Restoration Party	6,002	0.36
Godfrey Miyanda	Heritage Party	5,757	0.35
Daniel Pule	Christian Democratic Party	3,293	0.20
Ludwig Sondashi	Forum for Democratic Alternatives	2,073	0.13
Peter Sinkamba	Green Party of Zambia	1,410	0.09
Total		1,654,349	100.00
Valid votes		1,654,349	98.96
Invalid/blank votes		17,313	1.04
Total votes		1,671,662	100.00
Registered voters/turnout		5,166,084	32.36
Source: Electoral Commission

Four voters appear to be unaccounted for. The final results released by the Electoral Commission of Zambia on its website indicate the total registered voters as 5,166,084, as opposed to 5,166,088 previously published in the Certified Register of Voters.

== Aftermath ==
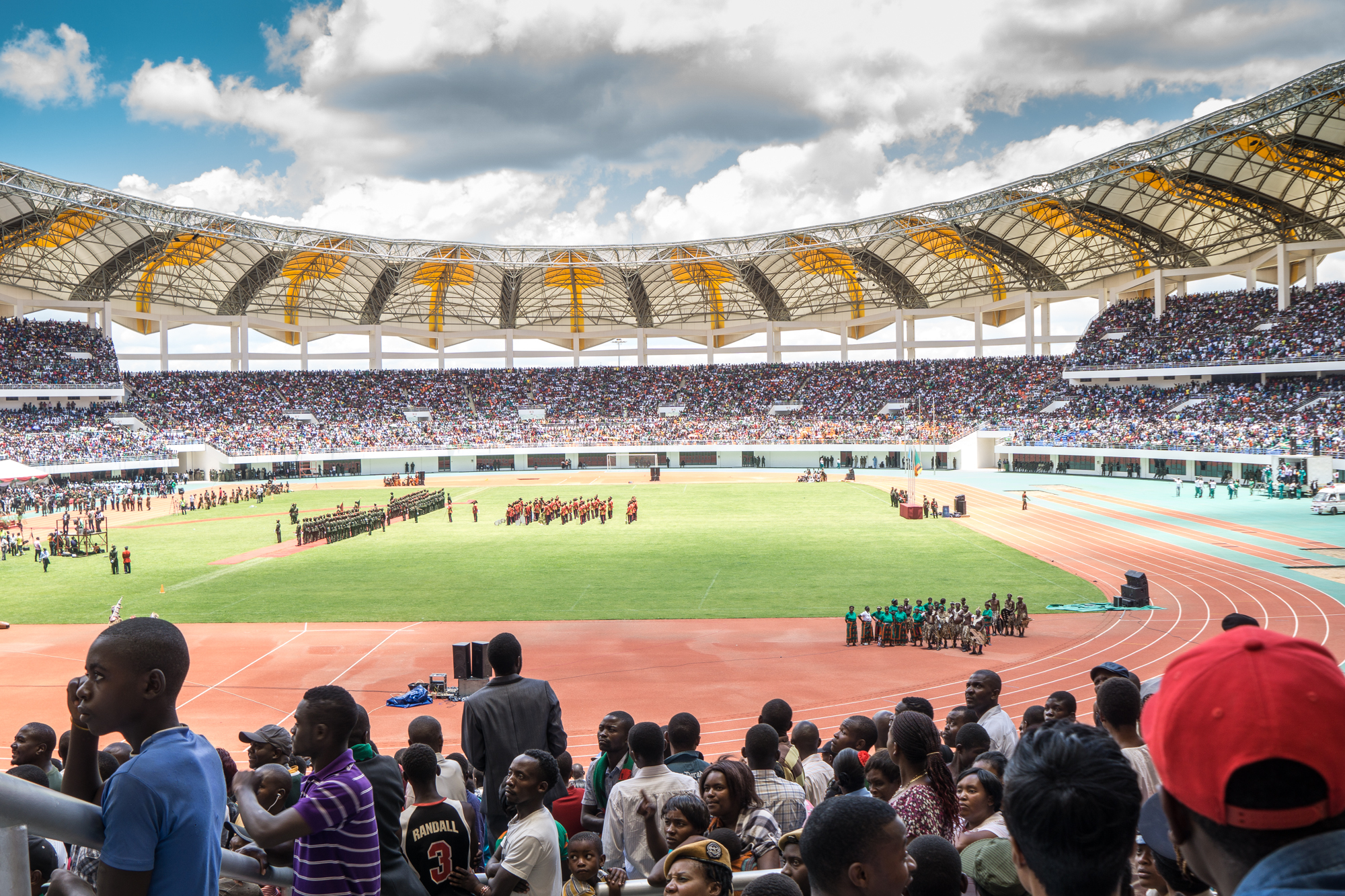
A cross section of the crowd at the inauguration ceremony.

Lungu was inaugurated as the sixth President on 25 January 2015 at the National Heroes Stadium in the capital Lusaka. Zimbabwean President Robert Mugabe attended the swearing in ceremony in his capacity as the Chairman of the Southern African Development Community. Nkosazana Dlamini-Zuma, the Chairperson of the African Union Commission, congratulated the Zambian people on the successful elections.
