= Patrick K. Kangwa =

- Kangwa in 2026

Secretary to the Cabinet of Zambia
- Incumbent
- Assumed office December 2022 (acting from 12 October 2021)
- President: Hakainde Hichilema
- Preceded by: Simon Miti

Deputy Secretary to the Cabinet (Administration)
- In office September 2017 – December 2022
- President: Edgar Lungu

National Coordinator, Disaster Management and Mitigation Unit
- In office August 2012 – September 2017
- Succeeded by: Chanda Kabwe

Personal details
- Born: Zambia
- Occupation: Civil servant
- Known for: Head of the Zambian Public Service
- Awards: Paul Harris Fellowship (Rotary International)

Patrick K. Kangwa is a Zambian civil servant serving as Secretary to the Cabinet of Zambia since December 2022. He also served as acting Secretary to the Cabinet from October 2021 to December 2022. As Secretary to the Cabinet, he is the head of the Zambian Public Service and advises the president on administrative matters under Article 176(1) of the Constitution of Zambia.

== Career ==
=== Disaster Management and Mitigation Unit ===
Kangwa served as National Coordinator of the Disaster Management and Mitigation Unit from August 2012 to September 2017. During his time at the DMMU, he was involved in coordinating government responses to disasters and other emergencies. In 2012, he worked with local authorities and emergency services on disaster preparedness and response in Lusaka.

=== Deputy Secretary to the Cabinet ===
In September 2017, Kangwa was appointed Deputy Secretary to the Cabinet (Administration) under President Edgar Lungu. He held the position until December 2022.

Kangwa also served as Acting Secretary to the Cabinet in 2019 while holding the position of Deputy Secretary to the Cabinet.

=== Acting Secretary to the Cabinet ===
Following the election of Hakainde Hichilema as president in 2021, Kangwa was appointed to act as Secretary to the Cabinet on 12 October 2021 after the contract of Simon Miti was terminated.

While acting as Secretary to the Cabinet, Kangwa issued directives concerning the movement of staff within the public service. In November 2021, he withdrew an earlier circular concerning staff movements while the matter was reviewed. The suspension was lifted the following month, with government directing public institutions to follow established procedures when making staff movements.

His appointment as acting Secretary to the Cabinet was also raised in the National Assembly of Zambia in July 2022 while he continued to serve in the position.

=== Secretary to the Cabinet ===
Kangwa was confirmed as Secretary to the Cabinet in December 2022. As Secretary to the Cabinet, he heads the Zambian Public Service and advises the president on administrative matters under Article 176(1) of the Constitution of Zambia.

In 2023, Kangwa warned government officials against disobeying presidential directives concerning the sale of government vehicles.

Kangwa has also been involved in government programmes concerning digital transformation and public-service administration. In 2023, he provided the foreword to the government's Digital Transformation Change Management Strategy for the Public Service. In 2026, he called on government institutions to adopt open-source solutions as part of the government's digital transformation programme. He has also addressed public-service officials on issues including implementation of government directives, productivity, professionalism and training.

== Awards ==
In August 2024, Kangwa received a Paul Harris Fellow award from Rotary International. The award was presented in Lusaka in recognition of cooperation between government and Rotary.

== See also ==
- Cabinet Office (Zambia)
- Politics of Zambia
