= Cabinet Office (Zambia) =

Highest administrative office in the Government of Zambia

- Coat of Arms of Zambia

Agency overview
- Formed: 1964
- Jurisdiction: Government of Zambia
- Headquarters: Cabinet Office Building, Cathedral Hill, Independence Avenue, Lusaka
- Agency executive: Patrick Kangwa, Secretary to the Cabinet
- Parent department: Office of the President
- Website: www.cabinet.gov.zm

The Cabinet Office is the highest administrative authority in the Government of Zambia, operating under the Office of the President (Zambia). It is responsible for coordinating policy implementation, managing the civil service, and supporting the operations of the Cabinet and President of Zambia. As of 2025, the Cabinet Office is headed by Patrick Kangwa, who was appointed as Secretary to the Cabinet in July 2022.

== Functions ==
The core functions of the Cabinet Office include coordinating the implementation of Cabinet decisions, managing the operations of government ministries, and ensuring adherence to public service standards. It also oversees appointments, promotions, and discipline within the civil service.

In addition, the Cabinet Office facilitates inter-ministerial communication and serves as a secretariat for Cabinet meetings, where it compiles agendas, records minutes, and tracks the execution of executive directives.

== Organizational structure ==
The Cabinet Office comprises several divisions that support its broad administrative mandate:

- Public Service Management Division (PSMD), which oversees human resource functions across the civil service, including recruitment, training, and performance management.
- Management Development Division (MDD), which is responsible for capacity building and reform implementation.
- Remuneration Division, which manages salary harmonization and job evaluation systems.
- Policy Analysis and Coordination Division (PACD), tasked with tracking implementation of key policies and inter-ministerial performance.
- Government Printing Department, which produces official gazettes, stationery, and government documents.

Each division is headed by a Permanent Secretary and coordinated by the Secretary to the Cabinet.

== Role in public service ==
The Cabinet Office plays a central role in Zambia's civil service system. Through PSMD and related departments, it supervises thousands of public officers across ministries and statutory bodies. It also ensures alignment of human resources with Zambia’s national development frameworks, including the Eighth National Development Plan (8NDP).

Ethics, accountability, and performance-based management are some of the core values the Cabinet Office enforces in the Zambian public service.

== Leadership ==
The Secretary to the Cabinet is the most senior civil servant in Zambia and serves as principal advisor to the President on administrative and policy matters. The officeholder also chairs meetings of Permanent Secretaries and oversees the coordination of government programs at the highest level.

== Relations with the Presidency ==
As a department under the Office of the President (Zambia), the Cabinet Office works closely with State House (Zambia) and other presidential units such as the Special Division and the Presidential Delivery Unit. It is the administrative link between the executive and government ministries, ensuring effective communication and implementation of presidential decisions.

== See also ==
- Office of the President (Zambia)
- President of Zambia
- Secretary to the Cabinet (Zambia)
- Civil service
- State House (Zambia)
