= Abdul Aziz bin Husain =

Malaysian businessman

Abdul Aziz bin Husain (born 18 July 1950 in Kuching, Sarawak, Malaysia) is the current Chairman of Eksons Corporation Bhd, a public listed entity that has two plywood plants in Sabah and Sarawak. He is involved in the real estate sector through Eksons' subsidiary Atmosphere Sdn Bhd.

Bin Husain's last post in the public sector was group managing director of Sarawak Energy Berhad, which he held after his retirement as State Secretary of the Sarawak Civil Service in December 2006. Before being appointed as the group MD, he was the chairman of the group executive management committee as well as the director of the company.

== Early life and education ==
Abdul Aziz bin Husain is his name on the original birth certificate issued by the Registrar of births and deaths. The registrar had recorded the child's father's name on the document as Husin bin Haji Paris, and the person who reported the birth as Hussain bin Haji Paris.

Bin Husain went to Sekolah Raayat (1955–61) for his primary school education, and Maderasah Melayu and Green Road Government Secondary School for his secondary education. He passed the Senior Cambridge Exam with a grade 1. He then attended St. Thomas's School Kuching (1967–1968) for Sixth Form, where he obtained the Full HSC Certificate in 1968. After a one-year teaching stint, he was admitted to the University of Malaya in 1970 on the Education Ministry Scholarship. Bin Husain earned a Bachelor in Economics, majoring in Business Administration in 1973. He obtained a Masters in Business Administration (MBA) with an emphasis on Finance in 1979 from Syracuse University in New York. While there, he studied in the Federal Public Service Department on a service training scholarship.

For his service to Sarawak, particularly in the areas of economics and human resource development, Swinburne University conferred upon bin Husain the Honorary Doctor of University Degree in October, 2008 in a graduation ceremony held in Melbourne, Australia.

== Family ==
Amar Abdul Aziz was married to the late Fredahanam Mahmud, a business executive. He has five children. He also has three grandchildren.

== Career ==
Amar Abdul Aziz started his career in the Sarawakian civil service as an assistant secretary with the Industries division of the state planning unit on July 23, 1973. After obtaining his MBA from Syracuse University, he was promoted to principal assistant secretary of the state financial secretary's office, Finance Section in August, 1979. He was then named Deputy Chairman of the SEDC in September 1981, a post which he held until January 1987. As Deputy Chairman, he ran the day-to-day operations of the Corporation.

While in SEDC, Bin Husain helped with the formation of the Bumiputra Entrepreneur Development Unit, which assisted Bumiputra entrepreneurs in the fields of trade and commerce. He also helped start the computerization of SEDC.

Bin Husain was transferred back to state service in Sarawak, and became deputy state financial secretary in January, 1987. In May 1990, he was appointed the Permanent Secretary of the Ministry of Infrastructure Development. He commissioned, among other things, the artesian wells for the coastal areas, as well as small gravity feed projects in interior areas. He planned the Kuching barrage, which now controls the tide level of the Sarawak River. The project, which has been proven effective in preventing the monthly flooding of the low-lying areas in Kuching, inhibits salt water intrusion and reduces erosion of the river banks.

Bin Husain served as a senior administrative officer in the Sarawak State Secretary’s office in September 1993 before being appointed the deputy state secretary in charge of Human Resources in January, 1994. He was officially appointed to the post of State Secretary of Sarawak on August 25, 2000, a post which he held until December 31, 2006.

Bin Husain has also served on various governments boards, statutory bodies, port authorities, charitable trusts, and government-linked companies. He was elected president of the Asia Pacific Region Training and Development Organization (ARTDO) in August, 1995 at the ARTDO’s Council Meeting in Melbourne, and re-elected for 1996/1997 in Manila. As the Chairman of ARTDO, bin Husain has conducted seminars and lectures in Human Resources at various national and international venues.

Bin Husain was involved in the Askar Wataniah (Malaysian Army Reserve Force) until his retirement. After attending intensive military training at Puswatan, Ipoh in 1995, he won the award for best recruit officer, and was conferred the post of Major. Bin Husain was subsequently promoted to the rank of lieutenant colonel and given the command of the First Battalion Regiment 511. He was again promoted to colonel in 2000, becoming the Commander of Regiment 511 AW. Bin Husain was again promoted, to the rank of brigadier general, and retired from the army in 2010. While he was State Secretary, bin Husain was also Chairman of Jawatankuasa Pendukong Askar Wataniah (JAKPAW). During his tenure in the AW, he expanded the size of the regiment and recruited over 120 new officers, primarily from the civil service.

For his work in the Askar Wataniah, bin Husain was conferred the Panglima Angkatan Tentera (PAT) by the Yang di-Pertuan Agung in 2000.

=== Sarawak Skill Development Centre ===
In the field of education and human resource development, bin Husain is currently Chairman of the Sarawak Skill Development Centre (PPKS), being first elected to the post in March 1999. When he started, PPKS was a small training centre offering a few technical courses with fewer than 100 students. Today, PPKS has over 200 staff and over 2000 students offering certificates and diploma programs. It also has joint study agreements with other institutions of learning, both in Malaysia and overseas.

=== PPKS Ilmu Sdn Bhd ===
Bin Husain is Chairman of PPKS Ilmu Sdn Bhd, a wholly owned subsidiary of PPKS which has set up the International College of Advance Technology Sarawak (ICATS) to conduct programs at the diploma level and higher. With the acquisition of the INTI Campus, ICATS will have the capacity to accommodate up to 3000 students.

=== Swinburne University of Technology ===
Bin Husain was the first chairman of Swinburne Sarawak Sdn Bhd, which manages the Swinburne University Sarawak Branch Campus. He helped in the development of the Swinburne New Campus at Simpang Tiga and oversaw the construction of new campus facilities. Currently, he sits as a member of the University Council.

=== Angkatan Zaman Mangsang ===
Bin Husain has been the Chairman of Angkatan Zaman Mangsang (AZAM) since March 1998, and was the founder of its sister organization Sarawak Development Institute (SDI), which was established in 1995 with a mission to provide independent and objective inputs to the State. SDI and AZAM conduct about 20 seminars and workshops yearly, covering various current issues.

=== President of Sarawak Club ===
He was the President of Sarawak Club, the oldest club in Malaysia, having held the post from September 2002 until 2009. Under his presidency, the club started building its own golf course at the Unimas Campus site. He oversaw the reconstruction of the Sarawak Club building, which was destroyed by a fire in July 2006.

=== Chairman of Persatuan Bagi Kebajikan Kanak-Kanak Terencat Akal Sarawak ===
Bin Husain is also the Chairman of Persatuan Bagi Kebajikan Kanak-Kanak Terencat Akal Sarawak (PERKATA), a Sarawak organization for intellectually disabled children, being first elected to the position in January 2001.

=== Sarawak Badminton Association ===
In sports, bin Husain has been the President of the Sarawak Badminton Association (SBA) since 2003, and sits as one of the Vice Presidents of the Malaysian Badminton Association. He is also the President of the Persatuan Badminton Bumiputra Sarawak, a post which he has held since 1985.

=== KOPPES (The SEDC Cooperative) ===
Bin Husain played an active role in cooperative development in Sarawak as the President of KOPPES (The SEDC Cooperative), which he help to form in 1986. KOPPES is currently rated in the top 100 cooperatives in Malaysia. Under his leadership, KOPPES has grown, and has many activities including land development, education, and health services. Bin Husain received the “Anugerah Tokoh Koperasi, Negeri Sarawak” in 1997 for his contribution and role in cooperative development in the state.

=== HIKMAH ===
Bin Husain is also the President Of HIKMAH (formerly BINA), being elected to that post in 2005 after holding the post of deputy president of the organization since 2000. He had also been a member of the BINA Supreme Council since 1991. For his service in HIKMAH and the Muslim community, bin Husain was awarded the Tokoh Khas Maal Hijrah in October 2013 by the TYT in Sibu.
