= Grow Zambia Agenda =

Development programme of the Zambian government

The Grow Zambia Agenda is a national development programme launched by President Hakainde Hichilema on 1 September 2026, during his inaugural address at Heroes Stadium following his re-election and swearing-in for a second term. It is intended to shift Zambia's policy focus from the macroeconomic stabilisation pursued during Hichilema's first term towards accelerated, production-led growth. Hichilema said the programme aims to triple the size of the Zambian economy over the following five years.

The agenda is based on a "Power – Production – Prosperity" blueprint and sets production targets to be reached by around 2031. These include 10 million tonnes of maize, 10,000 MW of electricity generation, 5 million tourist arrivals per year, 3 million tonnes of copper, 3 million tonnes of soya beans, 1 million tonnes of wheat, a US$1 billion beef industry, and 1 million tonnes of sugar. The programme also includes plans for job creation, agro-industrialisation, mining expansion, energy diversification, infrastructure development, human capital investment, and governance and digital government reforms.

== Targets and indicators ==
The Grow Zambia Agenda includes a set of quantitative production targets that the government intends to achieve by around 2031. Hichilema presented increased production as a central part of his second-term economic programme and linked the targets to the expansion of the Zambian economy, employment and household incomes.

The targets cover agriculture, mining, energy and tourism, with the Zambian government linking them to increased employment, exports and value addition. Hichilema said they were intended to move Zambia from the economic stabilisation pursued during his first term towards higher levels of production and economic growth. He said the programme could lead to a substantial expansion of the Zambian economy over the five-year period. The agenda also calls for increased agro-processing and agricultural exports, higher copper production, increased electricity generation, and the expansion of tourism as a source of employment and foreign exchange earnings.

The targets, often summarised as the "10-10-5-3-3-1-1-1" plan, are:

Sector	Target
Agriculture and agro-industry	10 million tonnes of maize per year
Agriculture and agro-industry	3 million tonnes of soya beans per year
Agriculture and agro-industry	1 million tonnes of wheat per year
Agriculture and agro-industry	1 million tonnes of sugar per year
Agriculture and agro-industry	US$1 billion beef industry
Energy	10,000 MW of installed electricity generation capacity
Mining	3 million tonnes of copper production per year
Tourism	5 million international tourist arrivals per year

== Reception ==
The Grow Zambia Agenda received responses from business and civil society organisations following its announcement. The Zambia Association of Manufacturers said the agenda presented an opportunity to strengthen manufacturing linkages with agriculture, mining, energy and other sectors. Its president, Mohammed Umar, said achieving the targets would require greater domestic industrial capacity to process raw materials, manufacture inputs and develop local supply chains.

Women for Change welcomed the Grow Zambia Agenda but called for women and girls to be given greater consideration in its implementation. Its executive director, Lumba Siyanga, said economic growth should be inclusive and gender-responsive, noting the role of women in small-scale farming, informal trade, entrepreneurship and caregiving. The Non-governmental Gender Organisations' Coordinating Council also called for a more inclusive approach to the new administration's development programme.

On 3 September, Siyanga criticised Hichilema's inaugural address for not making an explicit commitment to women's economic empowerment. She said that women should be deliberately included in the implementation of the Grow Zambia Agenda and called for them to be recognised as economic actors.

== See also ==
- Hakainde Hichilema
- Economy of Zambia
- Politics of Zambia
- Second inauguration of Hakainde Hichilema
