= Minister for Regional Development =

Minister for Regional Development may refer to:

- Minister for Regional Development (New South Wales), a position in the government of the Australian state of New South Wales
- Minister for Regional Development (Western Australia), a position in the government of the Australian state of Western Australia

== See also ==
- Ministry of Regional Development (disambiguation)
