= State House, Lusaka =

Official residence of the President of Zambia

State House
- Former names: Government House

General information
- Type: Official residence and workplace
- Location: Bimbe, Lusaka, Zambia
- Coordinates: 15°25′44″S 28°19′38″E
- Current tenants: President of Zambia Hakainde Hichilema
- Construction started: 1930
- Completed: 1934
- Opened: 1935
- Owner: Government of Zambia

Design and construction
- Architect: William Walcot

State House is the official residence and principal workplace of the President of Zambia. Located in the Bimbe area of Lusaka on Independence Avenue, the estate occupies approximately 72 hectares (178 acres). Designed by British architect William Walcot in the neoclassical style, construction began in 1930, concluded in 1934, and the building officially opened in 1935. Originally known as Government House, it served as the residence of the colonial governors of Northern Rhodesia until 1964, after which it was renamed State House and became the official residence of President Kenneth Kaunda, Zambia's first post-independence head of state.

State House also functions as a metonym for the Executive Office of the President of Zambia, housing the Office of the President, the Vice-president's Office, the Cabinet Secretariat, the Presidential Delivery Unit, and key ministries—all located within the estate. As the centre of Zambia's executive branch, State House hosts foreign dignitaries, cabinet meetings, and state ceremonies. The grounds also include displays illustrating the development of Lusaka and Zambia's political history. The estate includes a golf course, tennis court, a variety of wildlife species, a healthcare clinic, a filling station, and a police post among other amenities.

== History ==
=== Colonial era ===
The Beit Trust was established by Alfred Beit's will in 1906 to support infrastructure development in Northern Rhodesia, funding projects such as roads, bridges, hospitals, and government buildings. Construction of Government House (now State House) began in 1930. Designed by British architect Sir William Walcot in the neoclassical style, the building was completed in 1934 and officially opened in 1935. From 1935 until independence in 1964, the building served as the residence of 13 colonial governors, including Major Sir Hubert Young and Sir Evelyn Hone. Notably, Sir John Maybin died in office in 1941 and is buried in Lusaka. Besides Government House, the Beit Trust also contributed to infrastructure such as Independence Avenue Road, Cairo Road, Lusaka City Airport, the Supreme Court of Zambia, Ministry of Foreign Affairs, Cabinet Office in Lusaka, University Teaching Hospital (European Hospital), Kafue Bridge, Luangwa Bridge, and Beit Bridge on the Zimbabwe–Zambia border.

=== Post-independence, security developments and Security controversies ===
Zambia gained independence in 1964, and Government House was renamed State House. Kenneth Kaunda became the first president to reside there. During his tenure, he commissioned additions including Nkwazi House and a 19-hole golf course, and upgraded security in 1974. In 1995, former President Frederick Chiluba publicly revealed secret underground tunnels beneath State House, constructed during Kaunda's administration. The tunnels reportedly served security purposes and contained facilities such as a radio station, bunk beds, damp rooms, and a council chamber. No evidence of torture chambers was found during the inspection. The disclosure caused political controversy. Some officials and the Zambia Congress of Trade Unions demanded punishment for those who revealed the tunnels. Allegations surfaced that Major Ronald Chansa was detained and tortured there in 1981; these claims were denied by Kaunda as isolated or exaggerated incidents. This episode reflected the tense political environment during Zambia's early multiparty democracy.

== Current use and condition ==
Hakainde Hichilema, sworn in on 24 August 2021, continues to operate from State House as his official workplace. On 25 November 2024, he addressed the 16 Days of Activism Against Gender-Based Violence Conference held at the residence. The building has shown signs of aging—visible cracks and outdated infrastructure—leading to a 2017 parliamentary recommendation for a US$20 million rebuild. However, this has not yet been implemented, and the original structure remains in use.

=== Occupants ===
Since 1935, 13 colonial governors have lived in State House, with Major Sir Hubert Young being the first occupant and Sir Evelyn Hone the last governor to live there. During this time, one governor, Sir John Maybin, died in office on 9 April 1941 and is the only governor buried at Aylmer May Cemetery in Rhodes Park, Lusaka. Since independence, six presidents have resided in State House, including Levy Mwanawasa and Michael Sata, both of whom died in office while living there. However, the current president, Hakainde Hichilema, resides in his private residence known as the Community House in New Kasama rather than within State House.

=== Former occupants ===
No.	Portrait	Name (Birth–Death)	Time of residence		
No.	Portrait	Name (Birth–Death)	Took residence	Left residence	Duration
1		Kenneth Kaunda (1924–2021)	24 October 1964	2 November 1991	27 years, 9 days
2		Frederick Chiluba (1943–2011)	2 November 1991	2 January 2002	10 years, 61 days
3		Levy Mwanawasa (1948–2008)	2 January 2002	19 August 2008^{[†]}	6 years, 230 days
4		Rupiah Banda (1937–2022)	2 November 2008	23 September 2011	2 years, 325 days
5		Michael Sata (1937–2014)	23 September 2011	28 October 2014^{[†]}	3 years, 35 days
6		Edgar Lungu (1956–2025)	25 January 2015	24 August 2021	6 years, 211 days

== See also ==
- Kenneth Kaunda
- Government of Zambia
- Chilenje House 394
