= Rainbow party =

Rainbow party or Rainbow Party may refer to:

== Political parties ==
- Rainbow (Greece), a regionalist political party in Greece
- Economic Front, a socialist political party in Zambia formerly known as the Rainbow Party
- White Panther Party, an American anti-racist political collective also known as the Rainbow People's Party
- Rainbow Coalition, the name of several political concepts or movements
- Green-Rainbow Party, the Massachusetts affiliate of the Green Party of the United States

== Other uses ==
- Rainbow party (urban legend), an urban legend about a sex party
- Rainbow Party, a 2005 teen novel by Paul Ruditis
