= Annel =

Annel could refer to:

- Angeli, Finland, a village
- Annel Silungwe (1936–2024), Zambian jurist
