= Constitutional Court of Zambia =

The Constitutional Court of Zambia is the apex court in Zambia for matters related to the Constitution. It was established in 2016, before which the High Court ruled on constitutional law matters, with a possibility of appeal to the Supreme Court. It is equivalent in rank to the Supreme Court.

== Judges ==
The Constitutional Court consists of 13 judges, including the president, the deputy president, and 11 other judges. Its current president is Mulela Margaret Munalula, in office since 2023.
