= Irene Mambilima =

7th Chief Justice of Zambia (1952–2021)

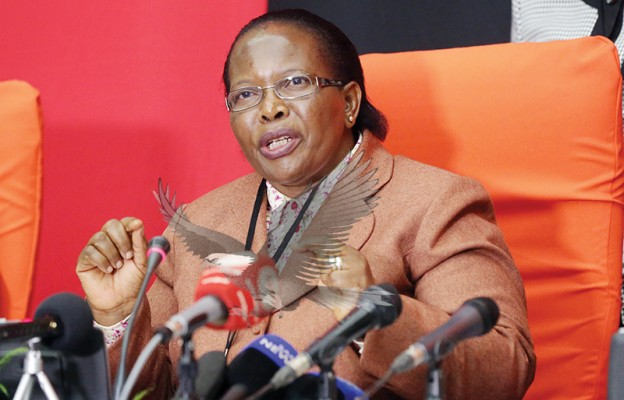

7th Chief Justice of Zambia
- In office March 2, 2015 – June 20, 2021
- Nominated by: Edgar Lungu
- Preceded by: Ernest Sakala

Deputy Chief Justice
- In office March 20, 2008 – March 2, 2015
- Nominated by: Levy Mwanawasa
- Preceded by: David Lewanika
- Succeeded by: Mumba Malila

Personal details
- Born: 31 March 1952 Chiwoko Village, Chipata
- Died: 20 June 2021 (aged 69)
- Spouse(s): Major Joseph Mambilima (?-2021) (ZAF, retired)
- Children: 5
- Education: University of Zambia, (LL.B); School of Oriental and African Studies, (LL.M)

Irene Chirwa Mambilima (March 31, 1952 – June 20, 2021) was the Chief Justice of Zambia from 2015 until her death in 2021. She also served as Chairperson of the Electoral Commission of Zambia and presided over the 2006 and 2011 general elections and the January 2015 presidential by-election. She was part of several election observer missions including in Liberia, Kenya, Mozambique, and Seychelles. Her other international assignments included serving as Sessional Judge of the Supreme Court of The Gambia in 2003. Mambilima sat on the International Board of the International Association of Women Judges (IAWJ) as a Director of the Africa Region. She was also a member of several professional associations including the Zambia Association of Women Judges, the Editorial Board Council of Law Reporting, the Child Fund (Zambia), Women in Law Southern Africa, and the Council of the Institution of Advanced Legal Education.

Mambilima's appointment as Chief Justice was unanimously ratified by the National Assembly in February 2015, making her the country's first female Chief Justice.

== Education and background ==
Mambilima was born in the village of Chiwoko in modern-day Eastern Province to Kezias Chirwa, a bricklayer, and his wife Nelia Ngulube. She was raised in the underprivileged Matero district of Lusaka, where she attended school.

She earned a Bachelor of Laws (LL.B.) from the University of Zambia (1976), a Post Graduate Diploma in Law Practice from the Law Practice Institute (now known as the Zambia Institute of Advanced Legal Education, ZIALE), and a Master of Laws (LL.M.) from the School of Oriental and African Studies, University of London (1977). She was admitted to the Zambian Bar in 1977 and in the same year appointed State Advocate under the Attorney General's Chambers. She rose through the ranks, working in various capacities including as Director of Legal Aid, High Court Judge, Supreme Court Judge and Deputy Chief Justice.

== Supreme Court ==
In 2002 she was elevated to the Supreme Court bench. While serving as a Supreme Court Judge, she was seconded to the Electoral Commission of Zambia (ECZ) as Chairperson in 2005. In that capacity, she presided over the 2006 General Elections. In 2008 she was recalled from ECZ and appointed Deputy Chief Justice. During her tenure as Deputy Chief Justice she was seconded once more to the ECZ to preside over the 2011 General Elections, and 2015 Presidential by-election. She was appointed Chief Justice in February 2015 and took the oath of office at State House on March 2, 2015.

=== Early decisions ===
Two of Justice Mambilima's most high-profile decisions centered on the tribunals constituted to investigate alleged corruption and abuse of office by the former Transport and Communications Minister in the Rupiah Banda administration and the former Director of Public Prosecutions in the Michael Sata administration.

The tribunal to investigate Dora Siliya, former Transport and Communications Minister, was established to investigate allegations that she awarded contracts to two firms without following laid down procedures in violation of Parliamentary and Ministerial Code of Conduct Act. The tribunal was set up in February 2009, and its published findings found Siliya in breach of multiple statutes, but left the resolution in the president's hands. Siliya did not face prosecution.

In the case of the former Director of Public Prosecutions, Mutembo Nchito, on March 16, 2015, Justice Mambilima swore in four members of the tribunal appointed by President Edgar Lungu to investigate him for alleged misconduct. Nchito applied for Judicial Review of the tribunal proceedings, and the High Court granted a stay. Upon appeal by the state Justice Mambilima reserved ruling on the matter to a later date. The tribunal proceedings remain unresolved.

== Electoral Commission of Zambia ==
=== Chairperson ===
Justice Mambilima was first appointed chairperson of the Electoral Commission of Zambia (ECZ) in 2005, a position she held until March 2008. She had served as member of the commission between 1994 and 1996. She was later re-appointed Chair in February 2011 and ratified by parliament a month later. This followed the resignation of her successor Justice Florence Mumba during the controversy which saw then Executive Director Daniel Kalale suspended and later dismissed on unspecified grounds. Justice Mumba's resignation was precipitated by a workers' strike against her leadership. Mambilima's re-appointment by President Rupiah Banda was seen as a move to restore confidence in the commission, though speculation abounded that government fanned the confusion to force out Justice Mumba; a charge the government denied.

Various opposition party leaders and the leading private newspaper saw Justice Mambilima as government friendly, and this was illustrated in the run up to the 2011 general elections when she and the commission came under heavy criticism for the decision to print ballot papers in South Africa. The Government Printing Department indicated its lack of capacity to complete the task, and in the subsequent procurement process Universal Print Group (Pty) Ltd. of Durban, South Africa, was awarded the tender. This move was seen as a scheme by the ruling MMD to print pre-marked ballots in a bid to rig the elections in their favour. There were multiple allegations of corruption but no official investigations were launched or validated by the Anti-Corruption Commission (ACC), and ECZ stood by its decision to use the firm.

=== 2006 general elections ===
The 2006 general elections were held on 28 September. Opposition leader Michael Sata took an early lead in the count but as the majority of results came in his position slipped to third with the incumbent President Levy Mwanawasa taking a commanding lead. This announcement triggered protests by Sata's supporters in Lusaka, which later spread to Kitwe, an industrial hub in the copper mining region. The protests were met with force by armed police and the electoral commission delayed the announcement of more results because of the violence.

Sata alleged fraud citing that 400,000 votes in his strongholds were unaccounted for in the ongoing tally, and vowed to challenge the results. Justice Mambilima confirmed that the commission would investigate the complaints but none were substantiated. Mwanawasa emerged victorious, securing a second term in office with 1,177,846 votes to Michael Sata's 804,748. The president's ruling party, the Movement for Multi-Party Democracy (MMD), secured 45% of the seats in parliament, with the remainder split among the remaining parties. He was sworn into office on October 3, 2006, and served until his death on August 19, 2008.

=== 2008 presidential by-elections ===
Following the death of President Mwanawasa in office, a special presidential by-election was called to fill the vacancy. The main contenders were the country's vice-president Rupiah Banda, Michael Sata and Hakainde Hichilema. Once again there were allegations of rigging by the ruling party, aided by the electoral commission. Justice Mambilima did not oversee these elections as ECZ chair as she had taken up her new position as Deputy Chief Justice. Her successor Justice Florence Mumba defended the commission's work in difficult and unprecedented circumstances, and assured the nation that the elections would be conducted in a credible manner. Rupiah Banda won by a narrow margin, and opposition protests similar to those in 2006 ensued. This did not change the outcome or compel the commission to call for a recount. Banda was sworn in as president on November 2, 2008, with his term ending in 2011.

The losing candidate, Michael Sata, continued to seek a recount and took his petition to court, where the case made it to the Supreme Court. In her ruling, Justice Mambilima threw out the petition, declaring "...the application is refused...with costs." The court deemed the petition premature since no evidence was given to support a recount. Sata discontinued his court action.

=== 2011 general elections ===
Upon the conclusion of Banda's term in office, a general election was held on September 20, 2011, and as early results came through opposition leader Michael Sata was in the lead. Later it was shown on ECZ's official website that Sata had widened his lead in 133 out of 150 constituencies but the site was later taken offline with the commission claiming it was hacked and that the results weren't official. This led to an outcry that the commission was indeed working with the ruling party to rig the election in Banda's favour.

Justice Mambilima later appeared on national television to confirm the election results, a first for a sitting ECZ chairperson. She also appealed for calm as tallying continued through the night. On September 23, 2011, Michael Sata was confirmed as the president-elect. Days later it was revealed that outgoing president Rupiah Banda resisted conceding defeat and Justice Mambilima threatened resignation in protest. This is largely unverified but accepted lore among Zambians despite Justice Mambilima's protestations.

After the new government was ushered in, she called for them to help decentralise ECZ, allowing them to hire full-time employees at district level to improve efficiencies and be funded appropriately. In the aftermath of these polls Mambilima was largely praised for the commission's conduct. She was seen as tough and unyielding in the face of political pressure. However, with a slew of parliamentary results later overturned through the courts on various grounds such as electoral malpractice it has been questioned whether ECZ and other bodies were correct in declaring the polls free and fair.

=== 2015 presidential by-elections ===
A presidential by-election was held on January 20, 2015, following the death in office of President Michael Sata. The election was tightly contested between the ruling Patriotic Front (PF) and opposition United Party for National Development (UPND), the parties that eventually finished first and runner-up, respectively. With a charged atmosphere and violence seemingly imminent, Justice Mambilima took a firm stand and warned the two front-runners against trying to intimidate electoral staff. Justice Mambilima, who was sometimes called Zambia's 'iron lady' in reference to her firmness, also warned against claiming electoral victory before the official announcement and inciting premature celebration among supporters. The UPND wrote to Justice Mambilima claiming electoral malpractice by the PF and asking her not to declare a winner, a request the Commission did not indulge. When Edgar Lungu was declared winner, the UPND accused the Electoral Commission of conniving with the PF to manipulate the results, an allegation that Justice Mambilima dismissed. She argued that the process had been transparent and the UPND had been represented at every stage and would therefore also be party to the rigging they were accusing the Commission of. The following month, the UPND supported Justice Mambilima's ratification as Chief Justice.

== Illness and death ==
On 10 June 2021, Mambilima travelled to Egypt on official business and fell ill. She died in a private hospital in Cairo on 20 June.
