= Peter Sinkamba =

Zambian entrepreneur and politician

- Born: 7 August 1964 (age 61)
- Occupations: entrepreneur; politician
- Notable work: Sinkamba founded Citizens for a Better Environment in 1997.

Peter Sinkamba (born 7 August 1964) is a Zambian entrepreneur and politician. He was the candidate for the Green Party of Zambia in the 2015 and 2016 presidential elections.

== Business career ==
Sinkamba became wealthy exporting maize to Zaire.

== Environmental activism ==
Sinkamba founded Citizens for a Better Environment in 1997 due to the social and environmental risks of unregulated copper mining, particularly to the people living near mines.

He helped fight for sustainable relocation of communities whose houses were affected by mining activities on the Copperbelt. This includes the relocation of Ming'omba and Kawama communities by Konkola Copper Mines (KCM) in Chililabombwe. This relocation was done between 2000 and 2003 and involved of over 100 houses. He also helped relocation of over 100 households in Mufulira affected by cracking of houses due to historical mining activities.

He also helped set up a multi-million dollars Environmental Protection Fund for the mining sector in Zambia into which mining companies are obliged to contribute to cover their environmental liabilities. The objectives of the fund are to ensure that mining companies have sufficient resources to implement their environmental management plans, and also to provide a guarantee to government not to use public funds in the event that the mining company fails to rehabilitate its site.

When Anglo American Corporation pulled out Zambia in 2002, Sinkamba, through what he called the "Copperbelt Manifesto" rallied civil society groups across the globe to pressurize Anglo sustainably mitigate its environmental and social liabilities on the Copperbelt. This initiative led to Anglo setting up the Copperbelt Development Foundation and donating over 40% of shares in KCM to the foundation.

He has also negotiated, on behalf of government, World Bank support to mitigate historical environmental and social issues on the Copperbelt as well as the lead poisoning problem in Kabwe. Between 2002 and 2017 the World Bank and other have committed in excess of $100 million to address historical environmental and social problems on the Copperbelt and Kabwe.

== Political career ==
Sinkamba started politics in mainstream politics in 1990 as a youth activist under the Movement for Multi-Party Democracy (MMD). In 1991, he became the Deputy Secretary General for the National Democratic Alliance (NADA) and later the Secretary General of the National Conservative Party (NCP). He served on the Mwanakatwe Constitutional Review Commission to draft the Constitution of the Country from 1993 to 1994. He later founded the Green Party in 2013. As a candidate for the newly formed Green Party of Zambia in the 2015 presidential election, Sinkamba earned 1,410 votes. He later contested presidential election in 2016, earning 4,515 votes.

Sinkamba was a presidential candidate once again at the 2021 general election, where he got 499 votes. In early 2024, the Green Party joined the United Kwacha Alliance (UKA), an alliance of political parties. However, in September 2024, Green Party leader Sinkamba expressed issues with the alliance and his party disassociated from the alliance. Sinkamba went on to be a founding member of another alliance of political parties named the People's Pact.

In January 2026, the People's Pact decided that Fred M'membe of the Socialist Party will be their presidential candidate at the 2026 Zambian general election to happen in August that year. The People's Pact alliance opted to have five vice presidents with Sinkamba as one of them. However, it was reported on 31 March 2026 that Sinkamba and his Green Party had joined the Tonse Alliance after being expelled from the People's Pact the previous week.

== Political positions ==
Sinkamba has proposed that Zambia legalizes marijuana in order to diversity its economy.
