= Choma =

Choma may refer to:

== Places ==
- Choma, Zambia, town and capital of the Southern Province of Zambia
- Choma District, district of Zambia
  - Choma (constituency), a constituency of the National Assembly of Zambia
- Choma (Lycia), settlement of ancient Lycia
- Choma (fortress), Byzantine fortress in central Anatolia

== People ==
- John Choma (professor) (died 2014), American professor of electrical engineering
- John Choma (American football) (born 1955), American football player
- Ivan Choma (1923–2006), Ukrainian Greek-Catholic bishop in Italy
- Russ Choma, American investigative journalist

== Other uses ==
- Choma (Burn), 1971 album by American saxophonist Harold Land
