= Mulela Margaret Munalula =

President of the Constitutional Court of Zambia (since 2023)

President of the Constitutional Court
- Incumbent
- Assumed office 3 April 2023
- Preceded by: Hildah Chibomba

Personal details
- Born: 19 December 1958 (age 67)
- Education: University of Zambia; International Institute of Social Studies; Notre Dame University

Mulela Margaret Munalula (born 19 December 1958) is a Zambian judge and academic who has been serving as President of the Constitutional Court of Zambia since 2023. She was named justice of the Court in 2016 and its vicepresident in 2022.

== Early life ==
Munalula was born on 19 December 1958. She got a degree in law from the University of Zambia in 1981, where in 1989 Munalula obtained a master's degree in international law, constitutional law, and administrative law. In 1993, she obtained another master's degree in development studies with a specialization in gender and development from the International Institute of Social Studies in The Hague and a doctorate in law and human rights in 2001 from the Center for Civil and Human Rights at the University of Notre Dame in the United States thanks to a Fulbright scholarship.

== Career ==
She worked as resident magistrate between 1981 and 1985. That year, Munalula began working as legal counsel for financial institutions such as the Development Bank of Zambia and ZADB/Lima Bank.

She has taught law at the University of Zambia, teaching from 1990 to the mid-2010s, and between 2007 and 2014 she was dean of the law school. She has also been a visiting professor at the University of Namibia.

Munalula was appointed member of the Constitutional Court of Zambia on 23 March 2016. In June 2021, she was the only judge to oppose Edgar Lungu's re-election as president of Zambia, arguing that the constitution prevented him from running for a third term and that Lungu, despite becoming president after Michael Sata's death, had already been elected twice. As a judge, Munalula has been seen as one of the most independent from political influence.

On 28 May 2022 President Hakainde Hichilema appointed her vicepresident of the Constitutional Court. She took office as its president on 3 April 2023.

== Publications ==
- Women, Gender Discrimination and the Law
- Legal Process: Zambian Cases, Legislation and Commentaries
- A Right to Life: Sexual and Reproductive Rights, Gender, HIV/AIDS and the Law in Southern Africa
