= Presidency of Hakainde Hichilema =

Presidency of Hakainde Hichilema from 2021 to present

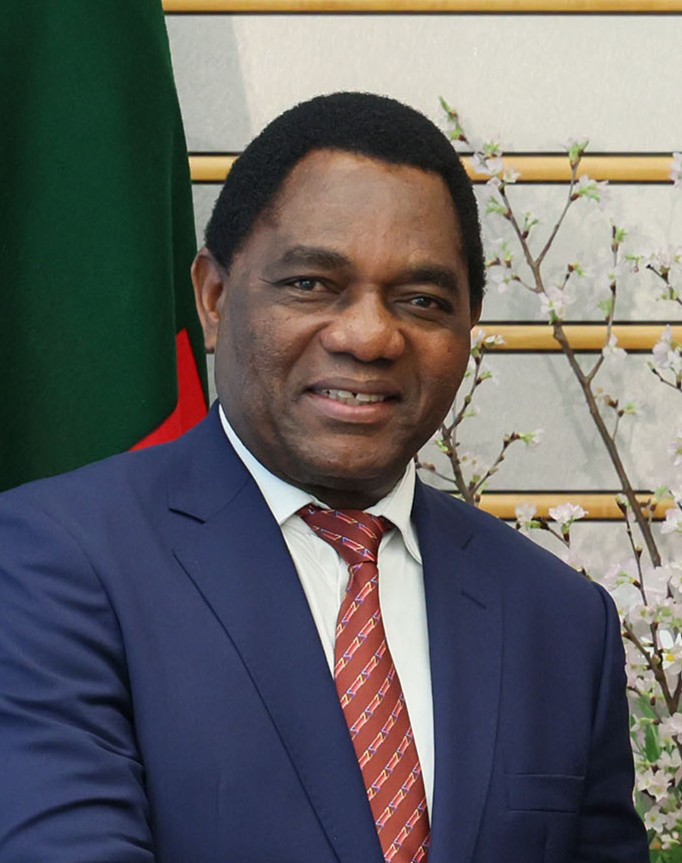
- Hakainde Hichilema in Japan
- Presidency of Hakainde Hichilema; 24 August 2021 – present
- Vice President: Mutale Nalumango
- Cabinet: 15th Cabinet
- Party: UPND
- Election: 2021; 2026
- Seat: State House

The presidency of Hakainde Hichilema began on 24 August 2021, when he was inaugurated as the seventh President of Zambia, and is still ongoing. Hichilema took office following his electoral victory over President Edgar Lungu in the 2021 general election. Five years later, he secured a second term in the 2026 Zambian general election, defeating Brian Mundubile and twelve other candidates without the need for a runoff.

Upon assuming office his first term, Hichilema inherited an economy facing severe challenges, including high national debt, double-digit inflation, currency depreciation, and widespread youth unemployment. His administration prioritized fiscal consolidation, institutional reforms, and renewed engagement with international partners. Notable initiatives included the establishment of the Public–Private Dialogue Forum, the creation of the Presidential Delivery Unit, and the revival of mining investments such as the restoration of operations at Konkola Copper Mines by Vedanta Resources. Inflation was brought down to single digits in the first year of his presidency.

During his term, Zambia faced multiple national crises, including a cholera outbreak and the worst drought in over four decades. In early 2024, Hichilema declared the drought a national disaster and introduced emergency measures to mitigate its impact on food security and energy generation. The drought led to widespread crop failure, school closures, and power rationing.

In 2025, the U.S. government suspended over $50 million in health aid to Zambia following revelations of "systemic theft" of medical supplies, including antiretroviral drugs. Hichilema responded by launching an independent investigation and dismissing officials implicated in the scandal.

On the energy front, Hichilema's government has promoted diversification away from hydropower. In June 2025, he commissioned Zambia's largest grid-connected solar plant, the 100 MW Chisamba solar facility, aimed at strengthening energy resilience and supporting mining operations.

Hichilema's foreign policy has emphasized economic diplomacy and international re-engagement. His administration improved ties with global partners, including China, the European Union, and the United States, while maintaining a principled stance on global issues such as the Russian invasion of Ukraine, voting in favor of United Nations resolutions condemning the war.

The first term has not been without political controversy. Following the death of former president Edgar Lungu in June 2025, a dispute arose between the government and the Lungu family regarding burial arrangements. The government filed legal action to halt a planned burial in South Africa, emphasizing the need for a state funeral in Zambia, in line with constitutional provisions.

== 2021 election ==
Hakainde Hichilema contested the 12 August 2021 general election as the presidential candidate of the United Party for National Development (UPND). He faced incumbent President Edgar Lungu of the Patriotic Front amid a worsening economic crisis, rising public debt, and growing concerns over democratic backsliding.

The election was marked by high voter turnout and a generally peaceful voting process, despite pre-election tensions that prompted the deployment of the military in some parts of the country. Hichilema won by a landslide, receiving over 2.8 million votes (59.38%) against Lungu’s 1.8 million (38.33%), the widest margin of victory since Zambia’s return to multiparty democracy in 1991. His victory was widely regarded as a significant milestone for Zambian democracy and was welcomed by both domestic observers and the international community.

Prior to his 2021 victory, Hichilema had established himself as a persistent opposition figure over more than a decade. In the 2006 Zambian general election, he entered the presidential race for the first time following the death of UPND founder Anderson Mazoka, finishing third with approximately 25.3% of the vote, behind Levy Mwanawasa (MMD) and Michael Sata (PF).

In the 2008 Zambian presidential election, held after President Mwanawasa's death, Hichilema again placed third behind Rupiah Banda (MMD) and Sata. The 2011 general election saw a similar outcome, with Hichilema finishing third as Michael Sata defeated the incumbent Banda to become president. In the closely contested 2015 Zambian presidential election, called after Sata’s death, Hichilema came within 27,000 votes of victory, narrowly losing to Edgar Lungu. He again challenged Lungu in the 2016 Zambian general election, running on a platform focused on economic reform and anti-corruption. He lost by a narrow margin, with Lungu receiving 50.3% of the vote to Hichilema’s 47.6%, amid allegations of electoral malpractice and post-election violence.

== 2026 Elections ==
Hichilema stood for a second term in the general election held on 13 August 2026, his seventh run for the presidency overall. He faced thirteen candidates, the leading challenger being Brian Mundubile of NRPUP, a former provincial minister making his first bid for the presidency.

Vote counting was briefly suspended amid security concerns, and international observer missions, including from the European Union and the Southern African Development Community, raised concerns over reports of intimidation and restrictions on the political opposition during the campaign period. Tensions escalated after polling day when authorities arrested nearly a dozen people, including senior opposition figures, in a raid the government linked to militia activity around the election; the allegations were denied by Mundubile's party.

On 18 August 2026, the Electoral Commission of Zambia declared Hichilema the outright winner with 60%, against 38% for Mundubile, avoiding the need for a run-off. EU observation mission chief Michael McNamara said the election itself was largely peaceful but that "late legal changes, legal uncertainty, and unequal campaign conditions distorted the playing field."

== See also ==
- Hakainde Hichilema
- 2021 Zambian general election
- United Party for National Development
- Edgar Lungu
- Politics of Zambia
- Economy of Zambia
- 2023–2024 Zambian cholera outbreak
- Zambia–United States relations
