= Death and state funeral of Michael Sata =

2014 death of the President of Zambia

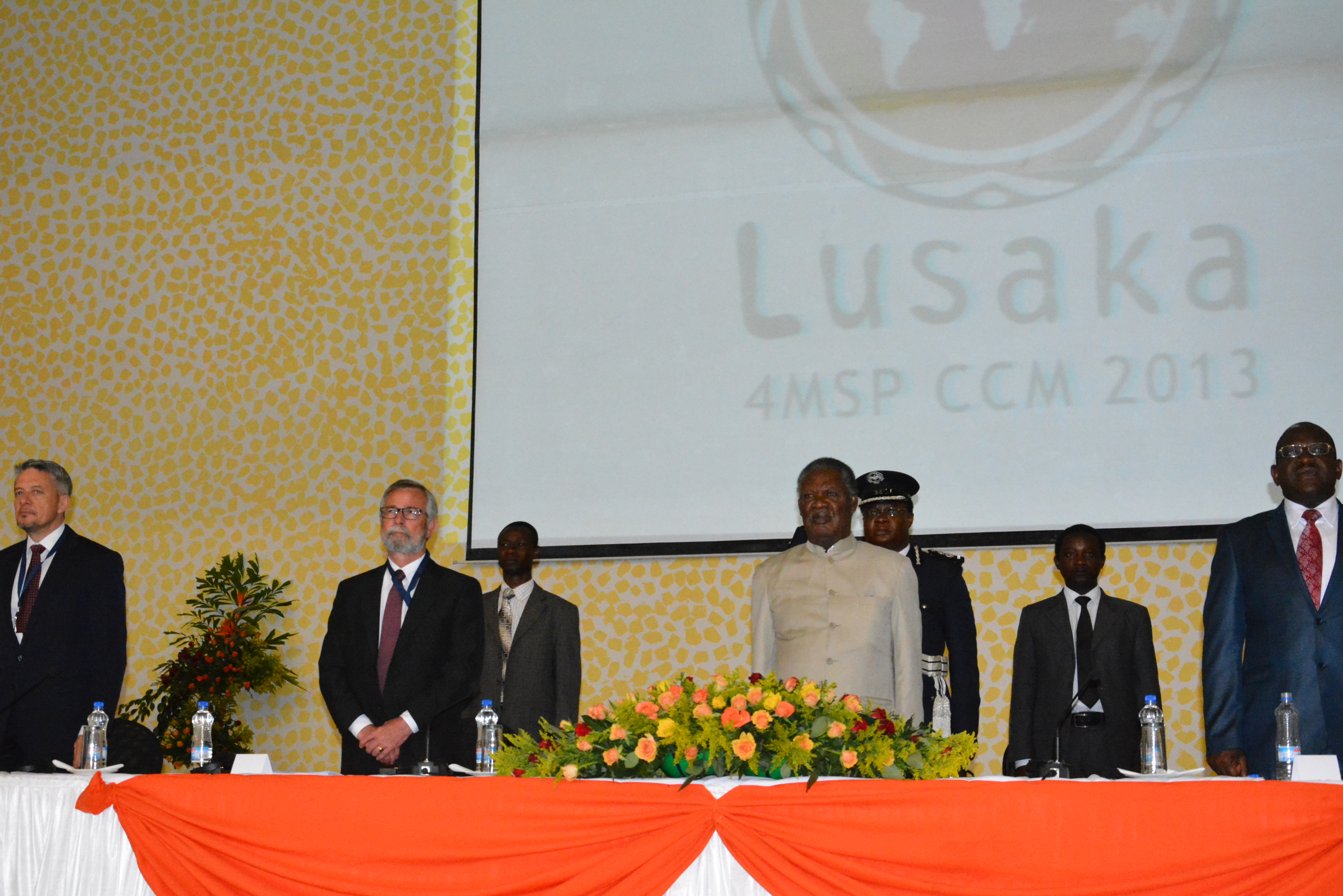
- Sata (centered) in 2013, the year before his death
- Date: 28 October 2014 (death); 11 November 2014 (state funeral)
- Location: Lusaka, Zambia
- Participants: Guy Scott; Edgar Lungu

Michael Sata, the fifth president of Zambia, died on 28 October 2014 in London at the age of 77, after suffering from an undisclosed severe illness. The state funeral took place on 11 November and was attended by nine heads of state, nine foreign representatives, two heads of multilateral organizations and two former African political leaders.

== Illness and death ==
On 19 October 2014, Sata left the country for a medical check-up in the United Kingdom, leaving Defence Minister Edgar Lungu in charge in his absence. Sata's absence from public view, given that the fiftieth anniversary of the country's independence was four days away, speculated rumours on the status of Sata's health. Sata died at King Edward VII's Hospital in London on 28 October, with his wife, Christine and son Mulenga by his bedside. Vice President Guy Scott became acting president until a presidential by-election could be held, making him the first head of state of European descent in Africa since F. W. de Klerk in apartheid-era South Africa, and the first ever under a democratic system.

== Funeral dignitaries ==
Country	Title	Dignitary
Kenya	President	Uhuru Kenyatta
Madagascar	President	Hery Rajaonarimampianina
Malawi	Vice President	Saulos Chilima
Mozambique	President	Armando Guebuza
Namibia	President	Hifikepunye Pohamba
South Africa	Deputy President	Cyril Ramaphosa
Swaziland	Prime Minister	Barnabas Sibusiso Dlamini
Tanzania	Vice President	Mohamed Gharib Bilal
Zimbabwe	President	Robert Mugabe

=== Government representatives ===
Country	Title	Dignitary
Angola	Speaker	Fernando dos Santos
China	Minister of Housing and Urban-Rural Development	Chen Zhenggao
Ethiopia	Speaker	Abadula Gemeda
Ghana	Minister of Central Region	Aquinas Tawiah Quansah
Sahrawi Republic	Minister of Foreign Affairs	Mohamed Salem Ould Salek
South Africa	First Lady	Bongekile Zuma
Tanzania	Speaker	Anne Makinda
United Kingdom	Countess of Wessex	Sophie
Zimbabwe	First Lady	Grace Mugabe

=== Heads of multilateral organizations ===
Organisation	Title	Dignitary
African Union	Chairperson	Nkosazana Dlamini-Zuma
Southern African Development Community	Executive Secretary	Stergomena Tax

=== Former leaders ===
Country	Title	Dignitary
Botswana	3rd President	Festus Mogae
Nigeria	Head of State	Yakubu Gowon

== Reactions ==
=== Domestic ===
Sata's predecessor, Rupiah Banda, said that Sata "was more than a public servant. He was a passionate competitor, a man of conviction and determination. He was also a loving son, a husband, a father, and friend to me, despite everything we've been through, a friend. Above all, Michael Sata was a Zambian, in body, soul, and spirit. We have gone through this before as a country and we made it to the other side because we were united. Let this be a time that we set aside the ideas that separate us, and embrace the humanity and dignity that unites us as a country and defines us as a people."

Mark Chona, former special assistant to Kenneth Kaunda, Zambia's first president, said: "We are very devastated because he was a very hard working and committed president and leader. He was extremely passionate about anything he had decided to achieve."

=== International ===
The South African government (which Vice President Scott had previously irritated by calling "backwards") issued a statement that read: "President Sata belongs to the generation of leaders produced by Zambia during the colonial times and gallantly pursued the anti-colonial struggle. His death reminds the people of South Africa of Zambia’s immeasurable sacrifice and the sterling leadership role that Zambia played in ridding the African continent of the yoke of colonial domination and apartheid rule."

Kenyan President Uhuru Kenyatta hailed Sata as an "outstanding son of Africa" and added: "He was gifted with unique, admirable abilities and strong values."

The Foreign Secretary of Zambia's former colonial power Britain, Philip Hammond, said: "[Sata] played a commanding role in the public life of his country over three decades...and finally as president."
