= Office of the President (Zambia) =

Government institution in Zambia responsible for executive administration

- Coat of Arms of Zambia

Agency overview
- Formed: 1964
- Jurisdiction: Government of Zambia
- Headquarters: State House, Independence Avenue, Lusaka
- Minister responsible: Hakainde Hichilema, President of Zambia
- Parent department: Government of Zambia
- Website: www.sh.gov.zm

The Office of the President (OP) is the central executive agency of the Government of Zambia, responsible for supporting the President of Zambia in the execution of constitutional duties and administrative functions. Established at independence in 1964, it serves as the coordinating body for presidential policy, communication, state security, and inter-ministerial operations.

== Structure and functions ==
The Office of the President comprises several key directorates and subordinate offices, including:

- State House – the official residence and primary workplace of the President.
- Cabinet Office – the central administrative hub that coordinates government ministries and public service operations.
- Special Division – responsible for state security and intelligence matters.
- Department of National Guidance and Religious Affairs.
- Presidential Delivery Unit – monitors the implementation of presidential and national priorities.

Its principal function is to provide advisory and administrative support to the Head of State, ensure coordination among ministries, and oversee national development agendas in line with presidential directives.

== State House ==
The Office of the President is headquartered at State House (Zambia), located in the capital city of Lusaka. State House serves as both the President's official residence and a venue for official state functions, diplomatic meetings, and policy announcements.

== Cabinet Office ==
Operating under the Office of the President, the Cabinet Office is the highest administrative authority in the civil service. It manages the coordination of government ministries, appointment and discipline of senior civil servants, and the implementation of Cabinet decisions.

== Role in intelligence and security ==
The Special Division under the Office of the President is tasked with intelligence gathering and national security. It works closely with the Zambia Security Intelligence Service (ZSIS) and other state agencies to ensure national stability and security.

== Presidential Delivery Unit ==
In recent years, the Presidential Delivery Unit (PDU) has been established to accelerate delivery of key government programs and reforms. It monitors initiatives, provides performance oversight, and addresses implementation bottlenecks across ministries.

== See also ==
- President of Zambia
- Politics of Zambia
- Cabinet Office (Zambia)
- State House (Zambia)
- Zambia Security Intelligence Service
