= Annel Silungwe =

Zambian jurist (1936–2024)

Chief Justice of Zambia
- In office 1 May 1975 – 30 June 1992
- President: Kenneth Kaunda; Frederick Chiluba
- Preceded by: Brian Andre Doyle
- Succeeded by: Matthew Ngulube

Attorney General of Zambia
- In office 1973–1975

Minister of Legal Affairs of Zambia
- In office 1973–1975
- President: Kenneth Kaunda
- Preceded by: Fitzpatrick Chuula
- Succeeded by: Mainza Chona

Acting Justice of the Supreme Court of Namibia
- In office 1995–1996

Personal details
- Born: 10 January 1936 Mbala, Northern Rhodesia
- Died: 30 June 2024 (aged 88) Lusaka, Zambia
- Education: University of Zambia
- Profession: Jurist

Annel Musenga Silungwe (10 January 1936 – 30 June 2024) was a Zambian jurist who served as the Chief Justice of Zambia from 1975 to 1992. He also served as a justice in Seychelles and for the Supreme Court of Namibia.

== Life and career ==
Silungwe was born on 10 January 1936 in Mbala in Northern Rhodesia. He attended mission schools and after receiving his education, became involved in religious affairs, being elected a deacon at a local church. A member of the United Church of Zambia, where he served as a trustee, he became a church elder in 1960 and became "one of the country's most able lay preachers." He also formed a church choir with several family members, and Silungwe credited reading the Bible with helping him in his judicial career. He also held multiple positions for the Christian Council of Zambia and was an executive committee member for the Bible Society of Zambia.

Silungwe entered civil service as a court interpreter in 1958. Within the next few years, he moved to London, England, where he studied and became a Barrister-at-Law at the Inner Temple in 1966. The following year, he returned to Zambia and was appointed resident magistrate. He later received the titles of Senior Resident Magistrate Class II (1968) and Senior Resident Magistrate Class I (1970), before a promotion to puisne judge in 1971. In 1973, he was appointed the Attorney General and the Minister of Legal Affairs, as well as nominated as a member of parliament (MP). He added the rank of state counsel in 1974 and remained in his Attorney General and ministerial positions until 1975. He also served with the Judicial Service Commission from 1972 to 1974, and chaired the Parliamentary Legislative Committee from 1973 to 1975.

On 1 May 1975, Silungwe was appointed Chief Justice of Zambia, the first indigenous person to hold the title. Aged 39 when first appointed to the position, he served 17 years, the longest in Zambian history, and retired on 30 June 1992. Namibian judge Peter Shivute later noted that Silungwe "served with dedication and distinction, earning him the respect and admiration of his colleagues and the legal community." Silungwe, who received a Master of Laws degree from the University of Zambia in 1977, also chaired the Judicial Service Commission, Council of Legal Education and the Council of Law Reporting during his tenure as Chief Justice. He additionally served as a council member with the World Jurist Association starting in 1977.

After his service as Chief Justice for Zambia, Silungwe was named a judge for the Court of Appeal of Seychelles in 1992. In 1995, he became the inaugural director of the Justice Training Centre (JTC) in Namibia, playing a "pivotal role" in the country's legal education. He was an acting justice for the Supreme Court of Namibia from 1995 to 1996 and was appointed a justice on the High Court of Namibia in 1999, where he served until retiring in March 2009. He also chaired Namibia's Magistrates Commission in 2003. Silungwe later was named chairman of a technical committee on drafting a new Zambian constitution in 2011, contributing to a draft constitution that was presented in 2013, although it did not become law.

Silungwe was married. He was a part-time lecturer at the University of Zambia from 1974 to 1980 and also gave lectures at the Law Practice Institute from 1975 to 1981. He died on 30 June 2024, at a hospital in Lusaka, at the age of 88. After his death, President Hakainde Hichilema described Silungwe as having "left behind a legacy marked by unwavering dedication to justice and the rule of law," and noted his "commitment to advancing democracy and advocating for human rights [and] contributions to promoting access to justice for all, without discrimination."
