= Russ Choma =

Russ Choma is a reporter working for Mother Jones. He was previously an investigative journalist for OpenSecrets. His work has covered climate and energy issues, transportation, and stimulus spending.

== Education ==
After graduating from the Wooster School, Choma attended Muhlenberg College, a private liberal arts school in Allentown, Pennsylvania.

While still a freshman, Choma started an independent online publication, The Muhlenberg Advocate. The Advocate, no longer in production, was an online alternative student news publication. He graduated in 2003 with a bachelor's degree in political science.

Choma attended American University for a master's degree in print journalism and public relations. While in attendance, he was awarded a fellowship at the Bureau of National Affairs, where he worked as a staff writer. In 2009, he was the winner of the Neiman Foundation for Journalism's I.F. Stone Medal for Journalistic Independence, a student essay contest.

== Writings ==
Russ Choma's investigative writings have been featured across the web on subjects ranging from financial reporting, environmental issues, congressional oversight, and healthcare. Choma's articles have been featured by Grist, the Neiman Foundation, OpenSecrets, and other alternative news outlets.

In 2009, Choma and the Investigative Reporting Workshop, a project of American University's School of Communication, garnered attention with their series Blown Away. In the initial article of this series, he claimed that a majority of the jobs created by President Obama's "green stimulus" had been sent overseas. These charges were covered by major news outlets, including ABC World News with Diane Sawyer. The American Wind Energy Association contested Choma's claims.
