= Economic Front =

Political party in Zambia

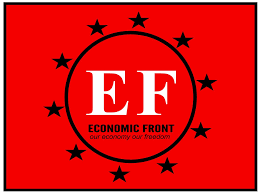
- Abbreviation: EF
- Leader: Wynter Kabimba
- Founded: 16 December 2014
- Split from: Patriotic Front
- Ideology: Democratic socialism
- Political position: Left-wing
- Colours: Rainbow
- Slogan: United We can
- National Assembly: 0 / 156

The Economic Front Party (EF) is a socialist political party in Zambia, formerly known as the Rainbow Party.

== History ==
The party was established on 16 December 2014 by former Minister of Justice and Patriotic Front secretary Wynter Kabimba, together with several other prominent PF members. The party participated in the 2016 general elections, winning no seats in the parliament.
