= Supreme Court of Zambia =

Highest court of authority of Zambia for non-constitutional law

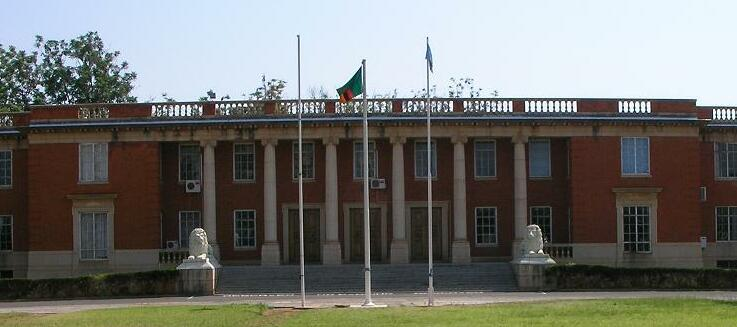
- Jurisdiction: Zambia
- Authorised by: Article 124, Constitution of Zambia
- Appeals from: Court of Appeal
- Number of positions: not less than 13
- Website: judiciaryzambia.com/supreme-court/

Chief Justice
- Currently: Mumba Malila
- Since: 2021

Deputy Chief Justice
- Currently: Michael Musonda
- Since: 2019

The Supreme Court of Zambia is the country's apex court on all matters, except those related to the constitution. Until 2016, the court was the highest court on all matters, but following the adoption of a new constitution in 2016, the Constitutional Court of Zambia was created with jurisdiction on matters related to the constitution and elections.
