= Minister of Infrastructure =

Minister of Infrastructure may refer to:

- Minister for Infrastructure and Transport (Australia)
- Minister for Infrastructure, Transport and Networks (Greece)
- National Infrastructure Minister of Israel
- Italian Minister of Infrastructures
- Minister of Land, Infrastructure, Transport and Tourism, Japan
- Minister of Infrastructure (Manitoba), Canada
- Minister of Infrastructure and Transportation (Manitoba) (1999–2016)
- Minister of Physical Infrastructure and Transport (Nepal)
- Minister for Physical Infrastructure Development (Koshi Province), Nepal
- Minister of Infrastructure and the Environment, Netherlands
- Minister for Infrastructure (New Zealand)
- Minister for Infrastructure, Planning and Logistics (Northern Territory), Canada
- Minister of Infrastructure (Ontario), Canada
- Cabinet Secretary for Infrastructure, Investment and Cities, Scotland
- Minister for Infrastructure (Sweden)
- Minister of Infrastructure (Ukraine)
- Minister of Housing and Infrastructure (Canada)
