= 2016 Zambian constitutional referendum =

11 August 2016

Results
Choice	Votes	%
Yes	1,852,559	71.09%
No	753,549	28.91%
Valid votes	2,606,108	77.90%
Invalid or blank votes	739,363	22.10%
Total votes	3,345,471	100.00%
Registered voters/turnout	7,528,091	44.44%

A constitutional referendum was held in Zambia on 11 August 2016 alongside general elections, a move designed to reduce the cost of the referendum. Voters were asked whether they approve of proposed amendments to the bill of rights and Article 79, which dictates the process of future amendments.

Although 71% of voters voted in favour of the amendments, the number of registered voters in favour was only 24.61%, below the 50% threshold required to validate the result.

== Background ==
The referendum sought to amend and enhance the Bill of rights and repeal and replace Article 79. The changes to the Bill of rights included the amendment of the "Civil and Political Rights" and the addition of an "Economic, Social, Cultural and Environmental Rights" and "Further and Special Rights" sections.

The gazetted referendum question was:

Do you agree to the amendment to the Constitution to enhance the Bill of rights contained in Part III of the Constitution of Zambia and to repeal and replace Article 79 of the Constitution of Zambia?

== Electoral system ==
For the referendum to pass, a majority 'yes' vote was required together with a total of at least 50% of eligible voters voting in favour. In previous general elections voter turnout has been poor and experts feared that due to different eligibility requirements of the general elections, the referendum would create confusion and be a waste of resources.

== Results ==
Choice	Votes	%
For	1,852,559	71.09
Against	753,549	28.91
Invalid/blank votes	739,363	22.10
Total	3,345,471	100
Registered voters/turnout	7,528,091	44.44
Source: ECZ
