= Ministry of Urban Development =

Ministry of Urban Development may refer to:

- Ministry of Urban Development (Albania)
- Ministry of Housing and Urban Affairs, India, formerly the Ministry of Urban Development
- Ministry of Urban Development (Maharashtra), India
- Ministry of Urban Development (Nepal)
- Ministry of Urban Development (Sri Lanka)
