= Ministry of Development =

Ministry of Development or Ministry of Regional Development may refer to:

== Economic development ==
- Ministry of Development (Greece), abolished in 2009
- Ministry of Development, Industry and Foreign Trade (Brazil)
- Ministry of Development, Competitiveness and Shipping (Greece), merger of the National Economy Ministry, Ministry of Development, and Mercantile Marine Ministry
- Ministry of Development (Poland)
- Ministry of Development (Turkey)
- Ministry of Economic Development and Trade (Ukraine)

== Regional, social or infrastructure development ==
- Ministry of Regional Development (Brazil)
- Ministry of Regional Development (Czech Republic)
- Ministry of Regional Development and Infrastructure (Georgia)
- Ministry of Regional Development (Kazakhstan)
- Ministry of Construction and Regional Development (Moldova)
- Ministry of Local Government and Regional Development (Norway)
- Ministry of Regional Development (Poland)
- Ministry of Regional Development and Tourism (Romania)
- Ministry of Regional Development (Russia)
- Ministry of Development (Spain)
- Ministry of Regional Development (Tunisia)
- Ministry of Regional Development (Ukraine)
