= Ministry of Infrastructure =

Ministry of infrastructure may refer to

- Canada
  - Ministry of Infrastructure (Manitoba)
  - Ministry of Infrastructure (Ontario)
- Ministry of Infrastructure (Poland)
- Ministry of Infrastructure (Rwanda)
- Ministry of Infrastructure (Slovenia)
- Ministry of Infrastructure (Sweden)
- Ministry of Infrastructure (Ukraine)
