= 2024 Zambian drought =

Severe drought impacting Zambia since January 2024

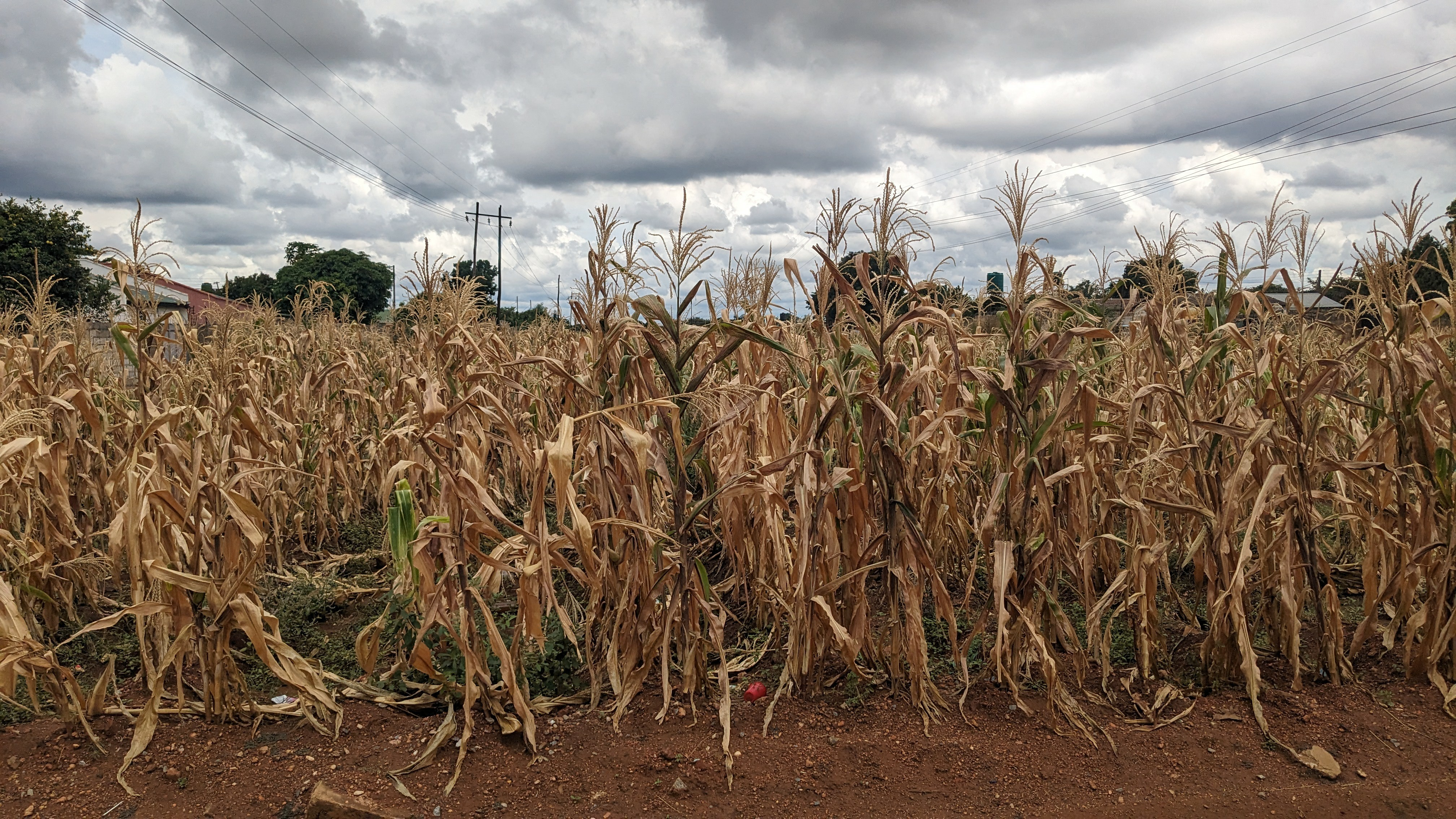
- Country: Zambia
- Location: Central Province, Eastern Province, Lusaka Province, North-Western Province, Southern Province and Western Province
- Period: January 2024 – January 2025
- Theory: severe drought, irregular rainfall

Starting in January 2024, most of Zambia began experiencing an ongoing drought, considered to be the worst to hit the country in at least two decades, leading to severe food shortages, water scarcity, and a national emergency declaration. The drought is affecting 84 of the 116 districts across Central, Copperbelt, Eastern, Lusaka, Northwestern, Southern, and Western provinces. Triggered by an El Niño-induced dry spell, the drought continues to have profound impacts on agriculture, water supply, and food security, affecting over a million children and households across the nation. Zambia's economy and food security is heavily dependent on rain-fed agriculture, making the country particularly vulnerable to changes in weather patterns. The 2023-2024 rainy season saw the influence of El Niño, leading to significantly reduced rainfall and the onset of severe drought conditions, which persist to the present day. On 29 February 2024, President Hakainde Hichilema declared the drought a national disaster.

== Government response and interventions ==
On 7 March 2024 the Zambia National Service implemented measures to alleviate its impact. Notably, the ZNS has commenced the planting of winter maize at its Chanyanya Farms in Kafue district, with plans to cultivate 1,978 hectares of maize by July 2024 with an estimated yield of 15,000 metric tonnes expected by the end of the third quarter. Furthermore, the Zambian Army and Zambian Air Force were instructed to utilize water sources within and around their Copperbelt and North Western province-based farms for irrigated maize production through drip irrigation.

== Impact on power supply ==
Due to the drought, Zambia, highly dependent on hydroelectric power, faces significant challenges. ZESCO Managing Director Victor Mapani announced the implementation of an 8-hour daily load shedding, that became effective on March 11, 2024. This decision comes after a thorough assessment of water levels in the Kafue and Zambezi basins. The amount of hours of daily load shedding increased to 12 hours in May 2024.

== See also ==
- 2023–2024 El Niño event
- Climate change in Zambia
