= First inauguration of Hakainde Hichilema =

Inauguration of Hakainde Hichilema
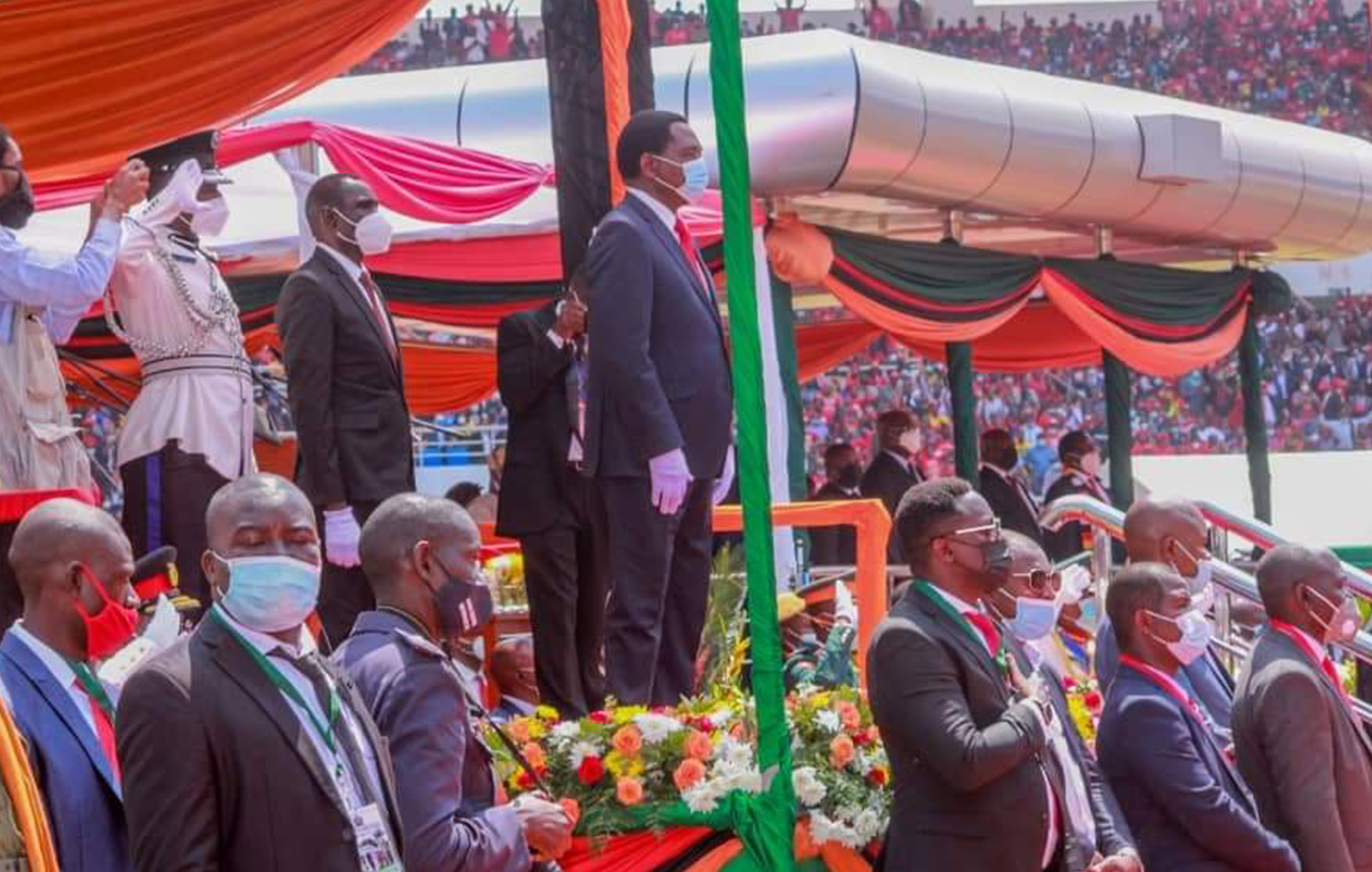
- Date: 24 August 2021
- Location: National Heroes Stadium, Lusaka
- Participants: Hakainde Hichilema; 7th president of Zambia — Assuming office Micheal Musonda; Acting Chief Justice of Zambia — Administering oath Mutale Nalumango; 14th vice president of Zambia — Assuming office Micheal Musonda; Acting Chief Justice of Zambia — Administering oath

The inauguration of Hakainde Hichilema as the 7th president of Zambia was held on 24 August 2021. President-elect Hichilema won by a landslide with over 996,000 votes between him and the Incumbent president Edgar Lungu who got 1,814, 201 votes in the August 2021 presidential election. Hakainde Hichilema took the oath alongside Mutale Nalumango as the vice-president of Zambia. The venue for the inauguration was National Heroes Stadium in Lusaka. Attendance was supposed to be restricted to invited guests only due to the COVID-19 preventive protocols, but was later made open to the public resulting in a filled out stadium The day of the inauguration was declared a public holiday in Zambia by president Edgar Lungu.

== Dignitaries ==
Country	Title	Dignitary	ref
South Africa	President	Cyril Ramaphosa	
Malawi	President and Chairperson Southern African Development Community	Lazarus Chakwera	
Botswana	President	Mokgweetsi Masisi	
Zimbabwe	President	Emmerson Mnangagwa	
Democratic Republic of the Congo	President and Chairperson of the African Union	Félix Tshisekedi	
Eswatini	Prime Minister	Cleopas Dlamini	
Kenya	President and Chairperson of the East African Community	Uhuru Kenyatta	
Mozambique	President	Filipe Nyusi	
Namibia	President	Hage Geingob	
Tanzania	President	Samia Suluhu Hassan	
Nigeria	Former President	Olusegun Obasanjo	
Commonwealth of Nations	Commonwealth Secretary-General	Patricia Scotland	

Government representatives
Country	Title	Dignitary	ref
US	Acting Director of the United States Trade and Development Agency	Ms. Enoh T. Ebong	
US	Special Assistant to the President and Senior Director for Africa	Ms. Dana L. Banks	
US	Chargé d'Affaires, ad interim U.S. Embassy Lusaka	Mr. David J. Young	
