= Judiciary of Zambia =

The Judiciary of Zambia is the branch of the Government of the Republic of Zambia which interprets and applies the country's laws to ensure impartial justice under law and to provide a mechanism for dispute resolution. Under the 1991 Constitution, justices and magistrates are independent of the government and subject only to the Constitution and the law.

According to the constitutional amendments of Act No. 2 of 2016, the structure of the judicature shall comprise the Supreme Court, with an equal ranking to the Constitutional Court, the appeals court, the High Court, the Subordinate Court, the Local Court and such lower courts as may be prescribed by an Act of Parliament.

The functions of the Judiciary include the administration of justice through resolving disputes between individuals or between individuals and the state, interpreting the Constitution and the laws of Zambia, promoting the rule of law, and protecting the human rights of individuals and groups.

== Supreme Court ==
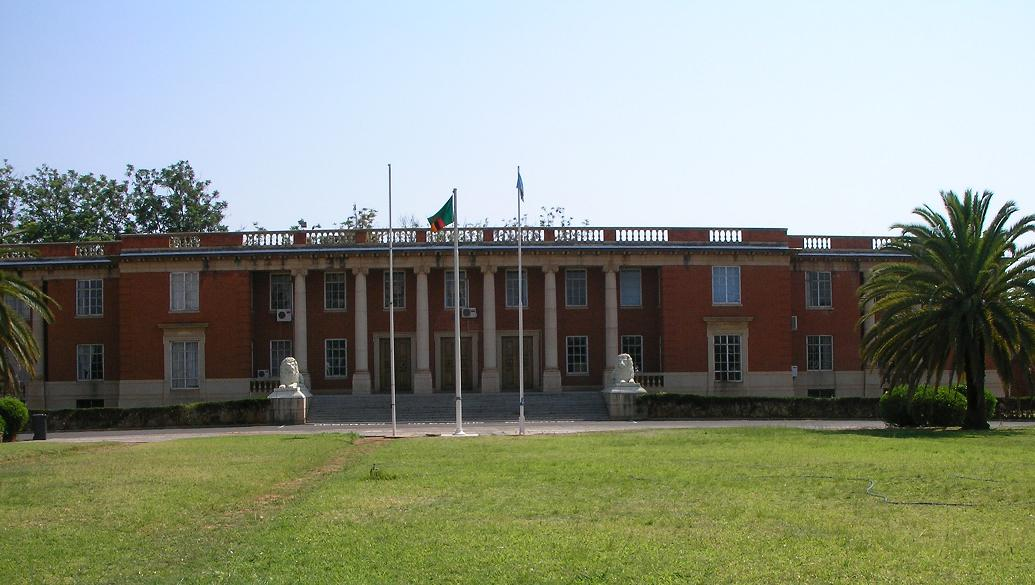
Supreme Court, Lusaka

The Supreme Court of Zambia is the final court of appeal and has the final say in all legal matters, including the interpretation of the Constitution. It consists of the chief justice, the deputy chief justice and seven or more Supreme Court judges. It is located in Independence Avenue, Lusaka.

=== The Constitutional Court of Zambia ===
Zambia in 2016 amended the Republican Constitution which created the new court called the Constitutional Court of Zambia. Locally nicknamed as the Concourt, it is established by Articles 127, 128 and 129. This court is constitutionally clothed with the power of interpreting presidential elections, constitutional supremacy, the Constitution, and members of parliament appeal cases which are at first heard by the High Court. The court ranks equivalently or at par to the Supreme Court of Zambia. The judicial decision of the Constitutional Court of Zambia is final and non-appealable to the Supreme Court. Subject to Article 28, this court does not hear Bill of Rights cases, because the 2016 referendum failed to gainer sufficient votes to amend the Bill of Rights. For now the Bill of Rights cases are heard by the High Court of Zambia.

=== The Court of Appeal of Zambia ===
This court is the third-highest court of appeal in Zambia below the Constitutional Court and Supreme Court. It is above the High Court of Zambia. It has jurisdiction over all appeal matters emanating from the High Court. A case cannot go direct to the Supreme Court, and the parties must obtain leave of the Court of Appeal according the Rules of the Court of Appeal 2016. The Court has no jurisdiction to interpret the Constitution; when a matter arises, the Court of Appeal will halt the proceedings and refer the matter to the Constitutional Court of Zambia for interpretation.

== High Court ==
The High Court's role is judicial review, in other words, interpretation of the law. It has the power to declare any law or ordinance unconstitutional if it is found to be against the Zambian Constitution. A High Court alone can certify the cases fit for appeal before the Supreme Court.

This court can be categorized into three separate courts, namely family courts, business court and industrial relations.

== Industrial relations courts ==
Located within Supreme Court premises. It is responsible for labour-related cases. It is a division of the High Court that adjudicates over labour matters. The High Court rules apply to it.

It was initially located where the Curt of Appeal is located today.

== Subordinate courts ==
These are the lower courts and the courts of the first instance, and are graded as first, second or third class. They can decide all matters except for offences of treason, murder and all matters that involve interpretations of the Constitution and are presided over by Resident Magistrates of appropriate status.

== Small claims courts ==
The Small Claims Courts deal with minor financial claims (less than K 20,000) except in certain circumstances.the cases are civil in nature and are handled by commissioners.

== Local courts ==
The Local Courts deal with customary matters, it also not a court of record because there's no strict adherence to what the law says the cases are civil in nature. They are also limited in terms of the severity of the sentences they can impose.

=== Law ===
Before the end of BSAC administration, Northern Rhodesian law was in conformity with the laws of England and Wales and its High Court of Northern Rhodesia was ultimately subordinate to those of the United Kingdom. This continued after 1924; all United Kingdom statutes in force on 17 August 1911 were applied to Northern Rhodesia, together with those of later years if specific to the Protectorate. Where Africans were parties before courts, Native law and customs were applied, except if they were "repugnant to natural justice or morality", or inconsistent with any other law in force.

==== Subsidiary Courts ====
Below the High Court were Magistrates' Courts which fell into four classes:

1. Courts of Provincial Commissioners, Senior Resident Magistrates and Resident Magistrates. In criminal matters, such courts could impose sentences of imprisonment for up to three years; in civil matters, they were limited to awards of £200 and for recovery of land worth up to £144 annual rent.
2. Courts of District Commissioners. In criminal matters, they could impose sentences of imprisonment for up to one year without confirmation by the High Court; they could also impose up to three years' imprisonment with the High Court's consent. Their civil jurisdiction was limited to £100.
3. Courts of District Officers.
4. Courts of Cadets attached to the Provincial Administration.

Criminal trials for treason, murder and manslaughter, or attempts and conspiracies to commit them, were reserved for the High Court. Civil matters relating to constitutional issues, wills and marriages were also restricted to the High Court.

==== Native Courts ====
The Native Courts Ordinance 1937 allowed the Governor to issue a warrant recognising native courts. Their jurisdiction only covered natives but extended to criminal and civil jurisdiction. Native courts were not allowed to impose the death penalty, nor try witchcraft without permission. There was also provision for a Native Court of Appeal, but if not established, appeal was to the Provincial Commissioner and thence to the High Court.

==== Chief Justices of North-Eastern Rhodesia ====
Incumbent	Tenure		Notes
Incumbent	Took office	Left office	Notes
Sir Leicester Paul Beaufort	1901	1911	

==== Chief Justices of Northern Rhodesia ====
Incumbent	Tenure		Notes
Incumbent	Took office	Left office	Notes
Cyril Gerard Brooke Francis		1941	afterwards Chief Justice of Bermuda, 1941
Sir Herbert Charles Fahie Cox	1945	1951	afterwards Chief Justice of Tanganyika
Sir Arthur Werner Lewey	1951	1955	
Sir (Edward) Peter Stubbs Bell	1955	1957	Died in office
John Bowes Griffin	1957	1957	acting Chief Justice
Sir George Paterson	1957	1961	
Sir Diarmaid William Conroy	1961	1964	afterwards Chief Justice of Zambia, 1964–1965

== Chief Justice ==
The chief justice of Zambia is an ex-officio Judge of the High Court.

List of chief justices

- 1964–1965: Sir Diarmaid Conroy
- 1966–1969: John Ramsey Blagden
- 1969: James John Skinner (afterwards Chief Justice of Malawi, 1970)
- 1969–1975: Brian Andre Doyle
- 1975–1992: Annel Silungwe
- 1992–2002: Matthew M.S.W. Ngulube
- 2003–2011: Ernest L. Sakala
  - 2012–2015: Mrs Lombe Chibesakunda (acting)
- 2015–2021: Irene Chirwa Mambilima
- 2021–present: Mumba Malila
