= Mumba Malila =

Chief Justice of Zambia

8th Chief Justice of Zambia
- Incumbent
- Assumed office December 22, 2021
- Nominated by: Hakainde Hichilema
- Preceded by: Irene Mambilima

Attorney General
- In office November 2011 – June 2014
- Nominated by: Michael Sata

Personal details
- Born: 16 April 1964 (age 62) Lusaka
- Education: University of Zambia, LLB University of Cambridge, LLM University of Cumbria, LLM University of Pretoria, LLD

Mumba Malila (born 16 April 1964) is a Zambian jurist who has served as the 8th Chief Justice of Zambia since 2021. He previously served as the Zambian Attorney Generala from 2011 to 2014. He currently serves as a member of the United Nations Working Group on Arbitrary Detention.

Prior to his appointment as Chief Justice, Malila served as a Supreme Court Judge, having been appointed by former Zambian President Michael Sata. In addition, he has also made significant contributions to the African Commission on Human and Peoples' Rights, where he served as the Commissioner and Vice Chairperson from October 2006 to November 2011.
