= Constitution of Zambia =

Supreme Law of Zambia since 1991

The Constitution of Zambia is the supreme law of the Republic of Zambia, and was formally adopted under the presidency of Kenneth Kaunda in 1991 by the National Assembly of Zambia, replacing the 1964 Independence constitution, and later amended in 2009. It gained its latest amendment on 5 January, 2016, signed by President Edgar Lungu.

The Constitution starts with the preamble and follows 20 parts outlining the structure of government, the separation of powers, the roles of the executive, legislature, and judiciary, and guaranteeing fundamental human rights and freedoms. The document also defines electoral systems, the functions of constitutional offices, the process of constitutional amendment, and the principles of governance, and the annex is the final section of the Constitution. Some parts in later amendments of the Constitution are found separately in external documents.

== Contents ==
=== Preamble ===
The Zambian Constitution's preamble reads:

WE, THE PEOPLE OF ZAMBIA:

ACKNOWLEDGE the supremacy of God Almighty;

DECLARE the Republic a Christian Nation while upholding a person’s right to freedom of conscience, belief or religion;

UPHOLD the human rights and fundamental freedoms of every person;

COMMIT ourselves to upholding the principles of democracy and good governance;

RESOLVE to ensure that our values relating to family, morality, patriotism and justice are maintained and all functions of the State are performed in our common interest;

CONFIRM the equal worth of women and men and their right to freely participate in, determine and build a sustainable political, legal, economic and social order;

RECOGNISE AND UPHOLD the multi-ethnic, multi-racial, multi-religious and multi-cultural character of our Nation and our right to manage our affairs and resources sustainably in a devolved system of governance;

RESOLVE that Zambia shall remain a unitary, multi-party and democratic sovereign State;

RECOGNISE AND HONOUR the freedom fighters who fought for the independence of our Nation in order to achieve liberty, justice and unity for the people of Zambia;

AND DIRECT that all State organs and State institutions abide by and respect our sovereign will;

DO HEREBY SOLEMNLY ADOPT AND GIVE TO OURSELVES THIS CONSTITUTION:

— National Assembly of Zambia, 1991 Constitution of Zambia (2016 amend.), Preamble

=== Part I: Supremacy of Constitution ===
Part I (Articles 1–7) of the Zambian Constitution affirms the Constitution as the supreme law of the Republic (Article 1), rendering any inconsistent law or custom void. It binds all persons and institutions, and constitutional matters are heard exclusively by the Constitutional Court. Citizens have a duty to defend the Constitution and resist illegal attempts to overthrow or suspend it (Article 2), and such attempts do not affect its validity (Article 3).

The Republic is defined as a sovereign, unitary, indivisible, multi-ethnic, multireligious, multi-party democratic state (Article 4), and sovereignty resides in the people, who may exercise it directly or through representatives, including by referendum (Article 5). Article 6 outlines the national symbols, while Article 7 lists the sources of law, including the Constitution, Acts of Parliament, statutory instruments, and customary law consistent with the Constitution.

=== Part II: National Values, Principles and Economic Policies ===
Part II (Articles 8–10) sets out Zambia’s national values and principles, including morality and ethics, patriotism, democracy, human dignity, equality, good governance, and sustainable development (Article 8). These principles are to guide the interpretation of the Constitution, the making and interpretation of laws, and the implementation of state policy. The President is required to report annually to the National Assembly on progress in applying these values (Article 9).

Article 10 establishes the basis of economic policy, requiring the government to promote a self-reliant economic environment, support citizen economic empowerment, and encourage both local and foreign investment. Investments are to be protected under international agreements, and compulsory acquisition is limited to cases permitted under international law. No compensation is owed for investments acquired if they originate from criminal activity.

=== Part III-V ===
Part III is found in the Bill of Rights, detailing fundamental human rights and freedoms, including civil, political, economic, social, and cultural rights. Part IV defines the Executive branch, including the President, Vice-President, Cabinet, and their powers, responsibilities, and election processes. Part V establishes the Legislature, specifying the composition and functions of the National Assembly, legislative procedures, and roles of Members of Parliament.

=== Part VI-VIII ===
Part VI comprises the structure and independence of the Judiciary, including the Constitutional Court, Supreme Court, Court of Appeal, and subordinate courts. Part VII consists of General Principles of Devolved Governance, introducing decentralisation through provincial and local authorities. Part VIII covers Public Finance and Budget, detailing the national budget process, public funds, taxation, and oversight bodies like the Auditor General.

=== Part IX-XX ===
Parts IX–XIII contain information about constitutional offices and commissions, such as the Electoral Commission of Zambia (ECZ), Human Rights Commission, Anti-Corruption Commission, Public Protector and others involved in service commissions and good governance. Part XIV outlines the Public Service, including appointments, discipline, and terms of public officers. Part XV addresses the Defence and Security services, including the Zambia Army, Air Force, Police, and intelligence services. Parts XVI–XVII handle Land, Environment and Natural Resources, and Chieftaincy and Traditional Affairs, recognising the roles of chiefs and customary practices. Part XVIII contains General Provisions relating to legal interpretation, oaths, and transitional arrangements. Part XIX covers the Amendment Procedure, requiring parliamentary approval and, in some cases, a national referendum for constitutional changes. Part XX includes Annexes and transitional provisions to guide the implementation of the amended Constitution.

== See also ==
- Constitutional references to God
- Christianity in Zambia
- 2016 Zambian constitutional referendum
- 1969 Zambian constitutional referendum
