= National Heroes Stadium =

Stadium in Lusaka, Zambia

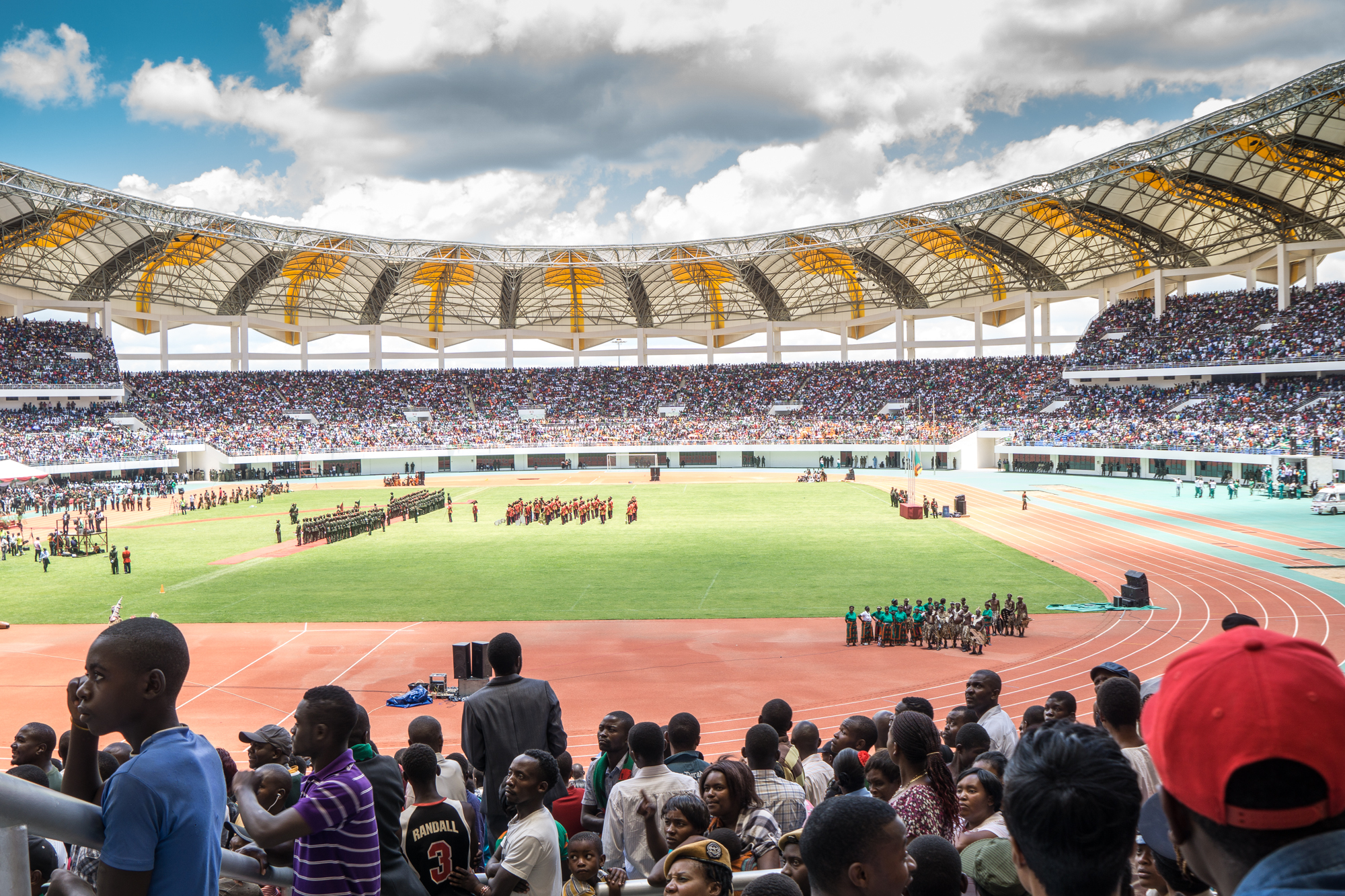
- Interactive map of National Heroes Stadium
- Former names: Gabon Disaster Heroes National Stadium
- Location: Lusaka, Lusaka Province, Zambia
- Coordinates: 15.3695°S 28.2726°E
- Capacity: 60,000
- Type: Multi-purpose stadium
- Surface: GrassMaster

Construction
- Groundbreaking: 10 January 2011
- Built: 2011–2014
- Opened: 2014
- Cost: US$94 million
- Main contractor: Shanghai Construction Group

Tenant
- Zambia national football team (2014–present)

Heroes National Stadium is a multi-purpose stadium in Lusaka, Lusaka Province, Zambia. It is currently used mostly for football matches and hosts the home matches of the Zambia national football team. The stadium holds 60,000 spectators. It opened in 2014. The name of the stadium refers to the 1993 Zambia national football team air disaster which took the lives of most of its national football team.

== History ==
Birds-eye view of National Heroes Stadium

Upon completion of construction in 2013, it was originally named the Gabon Disaster Heroes National Stadium because of this, but the government was pressured to change the name by the populace, with the name change happening less than a week later.

== Geography ==
View of Heroes Stadium from Zanimone Compound

The stadium's location is in the Matero suburb of Lusaka (Zambia's capital city) on the Great North Road (T2 road).

The Heroes National Stadium is located adjacent to the refurbished Independence Stadium and adjacent to the Heroes Acres Memorial where the players who died in the Gabon air disaster in 1993 are buried.

== See also ==
- Lists of stadiums
