= Elections in Zambia =

Elections in Zambia take place within the framework of a multi-party democracy and a presidential system. The President and National Assembly are simultaneously elected for five-year terms.

== Electoral history ==
=== Pre-independence ===
Elections for five members of the Advisory Council were held for the first time in 1918, at which time suffrage was limited to British subjects over the age of 21 who had lived in the territory for at least six months and owned at least £150 of property. Elections under the same system were held in 1920 and 1922. In 1924 a Legislative Council with five elected member was created, with the first elections held in 1926.

Prior to the 1929 elections the number of elected members was increased to seven. Subsequent elections were held in 1932, 1935 and 1938. The 1941 elections saw eight members elected, with the new Northern Rhodesian Labour Party winning five seats. However, after its defeat in the 1944 elections, the party was disbanded. Prior to the 1948 elections the number of elected members was increased to ten, with two Africans appointed to the Council.

In 1953 the Federation of Rhodesia and Nyasaland was formed, with all territories electing members to the federal Legislative Assembly. The first federal elections were held in the same year. Northern Rhodesia had eight ordinary seats, and three members representing African interests, two of which were Africans chosen by an electoral college and one European appointed by the governor. Only three Africans qualified to vote. The Federal Party won seven of the eight ordinary seats.

Constitutional reforms saw the number of elected seats in the Northern Rhodesian Legislative Council increase to twelve in 1954, with four African members selected by the Northern Rhodesian African Representative Council. The 1954 elections resulted in a victory for the Federal Party, which won ten seats. The next federal elections in 1958 saw a landslide victory for the United Federal Party (UFP), the successor the Federal Party, which won 46 of the 59 seats.

The promulgation of the "Lennox-Boyd constitution" led to the expansion of the Legislative Council to 22 elected members for the 1959 elections. It provided for 12 "ordinary" seats with mostly Europeans, six "special" seats mainly reserved for Africans, two reserved for Africans and two reserved for Europeans. The UFP retained their majority, winning 13 seats. Further constitutional reforms led to another electoral system being implemented for the 1962 elections, with 15 members elected by an upper roll, 15 elected by a lower roll and 15 by both rolls together. Although the UFP won the most seats, the United National Independence Party (UNIP) and the Northern Rhodesian African National Congress (NRANC) were able to form a coalition government.

The next elections in 1964 were held under another new system, with 65 seats elected by an African "main roll" and ten seats by a "reserved roll" primarily for Europeans. The result was a victory for UNIP, which won 55 of the 75 seats, allowing Kenneth Kaunda to become Prime Minister, and subsequently President when Zambia became independent on 24 October 1964.

=== Post-independence ===
General elections in 1968 included the first vote for president, with Kaunda defeating Zambian African National Congress (a renamed NRANC) leader Harry Nkumbula with 82% of the vote. The ten reserved seats in the National Assembly were abolished and the number of elected seats increased to 105, with an additional five members appointed by the President. UNIP won 81 of the elected seats.

In 1973 the country became a one-party state; general elections in the same year saw Kaunda run unopposed for the presidency, with voters voting yes or no to his candidacy (89% voted in favour). The National Assembly now had 125 elected seats, ten presidential appointees and a Speaker elected from outside the chamber. Although UNIP was the only legal party, up to three UNIP candidates could contest each seat. The same system was used for elections in 1978, 1983 and 1988, with Kaunda re-elected each time.

Multi-party democracy was restored in 1991, with general elections held in October that year. Kaunda was defeated by Frederick Chiluba of the Movement for Multi-Party Democracy (MMD) in the presidential elections, with Chiluba receiving 76% of the vote. The MMD won 125 of the 150 elected seats in an expanded National Assembly, whilst the number of presidential appointees was reduced to eight. Chiluba was re-elected in the 1996 elections, with the MMD winning 131 seats and UNIP losing all 25 seats it had won in 1991.

In 2001 MMD candidate Levy Mwanawasa won the presidential elections with just 29% of the vote in a field of eleven candidates. The MMD was reduced to 69 seats in the National Assembly, with opposition parties gaining a majority. Mwanawasa was re-elected in 2006 with 43% of the vote, although the MMD again failed to win a majority of seats in the National Assembly. After Mwanawasa's death in 2008, presidential elections were held for a candidate to serve the remainder of his five year term. The elections were won by the MMD's Rupiah Banda.

The 2011 general elections saw the Patriotic Front (PF) candidate Michael Sata elected president with 42% of the vote, whilst the PF became the largest party in the National Assembly, winning 60 seats. After Sata's death in 2014, another presidential by-election was held in 2015 and won by the PF's Edgar Lungu, who received 48% of the vote. Lungu was re-elected in the 2016 general elections, which also saw the PF gain a majority in the National Assembly, winning 80 of the 156 seats. In the 2021 elections Lungu was defeated by Hakainde Hichilema of the United Party for National Development (UPND), while the UPND also secured a majority in the National Assembly with 82 of the 156 elected seats.

== Electoral system ==
Elections in Zambia are organised by the Electoral Commission of Zambia (ECZ), an independent public body. The voting age is 18.

=== President ===
Between 1991 and 2015 the president was elected in a single round of voting by the first-past-the-post system. However, constitutional reforms passed in 2015 introduced the two-round system, which was used for the 2016 elections.

Until 2016, if a president died in office, a by-election was held to elect a president to serve the remainder of the five-year term; under this system presidential by-elections were held in 2008 and 2015 after two presidents had died in office. However, the 2015 constitutional amendments changed the office of vice president from a presidential appointee to an elected officeholder, who is chosen as the president's running mate and would accordingly serve the remainder of the five-year term without the need for a by-election if the president died.

=== National Assembly ===
Of the 164 members of the National Assembly, 156 are elected by the first-past-the-post system in single-member constituencies, with a further eight appointed by the President and a Speaker and one deputy speaker elected from outside the National Assembly. National Assembly candidates must be at least 21.

== Referendums ==
Since independence in 1964 two national referendum have been held in Zambia. A constitutional referendum in 1969 saw 85% of voters approve amendments to the constitution to remove the need for referendums on certain constitutional amendments. Another constitutional referendum in 2016 a majority of those voting were in favour of the amendments to the bill of rights, but turnout was below the 50% threshold required to validate the results.

== See also ==
- By-elections in Zambia
- Bibliography of the history of Zambia
