= List of members of the Legislative Council of Northern Rhodesia (1959–1962) =

Members of the Legislative Council of Northern Rhodesia from 1959 until 1962 were elected on 20 March 1959. The first session of the newly elected council started on 7 April. There were 22 elected members, four appointed members, four ex officio members and the Speaker.

== List of members ==
=== Elected members ===
Constituency	Member	Party	Notes
Barotseland	Kwalombota Mulonda	Independent	
Broken Hill	John Roberts	United Federal Party	Minister of Labour and Mines (1959–1961)
Chingola	William Gray Dunlop	United Federal Party	Minister of Transport and Works (1959–1961)
Copperbelt	Gabriel Musumbulwa	United Federal Party	Minister of African Education (1959–1961)
Eastern	Alfred Gondwe	Central Africa Party	Minister of African Education (1961–1962)
Eastern Rural	John Moffat	Central Africa Party	Minister of Land and Natural Resources (1961–1962)
Kitwe East	Hugh Stanley	United Federal Party	
Kitwe West	Jerry Steyn	United Federal Party	
Livingstone	Maurice Rabb	United Federal Party	
Luanshya	Rodney Malcomson	United Federal Party	Minister of Local Government (1959); Minister of Local Government and Social Welfare (1959–1961)
Luapula	Samson Mununga	Independent	
Lusaka Central	Ernest Sergeant	United Federal Party	
Lusaka East	Ebden Carlisle	United Federal Party	Minister of Land and Natural Resources (1959–1961)
Lusaka West	Eric Grindley-Ferris	United Federal Party	
Mufulira	Pieter Wulff	United Federal Party	
Ndola	Cecil Dennistoun Burney	United Federal Party	
North-Western	William Nkanza	Independent Central Africa Party	
Northern	Lakement Ngandu	Independent	
South Central	William Kazokah	United Federal Party	
South-Western	Harry Nkumbula	Northern Rhodesian African National Congress	
Southern	Gert Smith	Dominion Party	
Western Rural	Harry Franklin	Central Africa Party	Minister of Transport and Works (1961–1962)

==== Replacements ====
Constituency	Previous member	Party	Date	New member	Party
Chingola	William Gray Dunlop	United Federal Party	6 July 1961	William Atkins	United Federal Party
South-Western	Harry Nkumbula	Northern Rhodesian African National Congress	July 1961	Lawrence Katilungu	Northern Rhodesian African National Congress
South-Western	Lawrence Katilungu	Northern Rhodesian African National Congress		Job Michello	Northern Rhodesian African National Congress

=== Nominated members ===
Position	Member	Notes
Speaker	Thomas Williams	
Nominated Official Member	William McCall	Solicitor General
Nominated Official Member	H.L. Jones	Administrative Secretary
Nominated Unofficial Member	Edson Mwamba	Minister of African Agriculture; Minister of African Education (1962)
Nominated Unofficial Member	Vallabhbhai Mistry	

==== Replacements ====
Position	Previous member	Date	New member	Notes
Nominated Official Member	H.L. Jones	24 November 1959	N.C.A. Ridley	Chairman of Committee
Nominated Official Member	N.C.A. Ridley	14 June 1960	H.L. Jones	Administrative Secretary; Minister of Labour and Mines (1961–1962); Minister of Local Government (1961–1962)
Nominated Official Member	William McCall	14 March 1961	W.K.H. Jones	Solicitor-General
Nominated Official Member	W.K.H. Jones	27 June 1961	Charles Cousins	Secretary for Labour and Mines; Minister of Labour and Mines (1962)
Nominated Official Member	H.L. Jones	19 June 1962	William McCall	Solicitor-General

=== Ex officio members ===
Position	Member
Attorney-General and Minister of Legal Affairs	Brian Andre Doyle
Chief Secretary to the Government	Evelyn Dennison Hone, M.O. Wray, Ralph Nicholson, Richard Luyt
Minister of Finance	Ralph Nicholson, Trevor Gardner
Minister of Native Affairs	G.S. Jones, M.G. Billing, F.M. Thomas, L. Bean
