= List of members of the Legislative Council of Northern Rhodesia (1954–1958) =

Members of the Legislative Council of Northern Rhodesia from 1954 until 1958 were elected on 19 February 1954. The first session of the newly elected council started on 10 April. There were twelve elected members, 11 appointed members and four ex officio members. The number of appointed members increased to 12 in 1958.

== List of members ==
=== Elected members ===
Constituency	Member	Party	Notes
Broken Hill	John Roberts	Federal Party	Member for Health, Lands and Local Government (1954–1956); Member for Lands and Local Government (1956–1958)
Chingola	William Gray Dunlop	Federal Party	Member for Commerce and Industry (1954–1956); Member for Mines and Works (1956–1958)
Eastern	Reuben Kidson	Federal Party	
Livingstone	Frank Derby	Independent	
Luanshya	Rodney Malcomson	Federal Party	
Lusaka	Ernest Sergeant	Federal Party	
Midland	John Gaunt	Independent	
Mufulira	Lewin Tucker	Federal Party	
Ndola	Bill Rendall	Federal Party	
Nkana	James Botha	Federal Party	
Northern	Harold Watmore	Federal Party	Member for Agriculture and Natural Resources (1957–1958)
South-Western	William Harris Wroth	Federal Party	Member for Agriculture and Natural Resources (1954–1957)

==== Replacements ====
Constituency	Previous member	Party	Date	New member	Party	Notes
South-Western	William Harris Wroth	Federal Party	1 July 1957	Ebden Carlisle	Federal Party	Member for Agriculture and Natural Resources (1958)
Nkana	James Botha	Federal Party	20 December 1957	Jerry Steyn	United Federal Party	

=== Nominated members ===
Position	Member	Notes
Speaker	Thomas Spurgeon Page	
African Member	Safeli Chileshe	
African Member	Robinson Nabulyato	
African Member	Lakement Ngandu	
African Member	Pascale Sokota	
Nominated Official Member	L.F. Leversedge	Development Secretary
Nominated Official Member	K.V. Macquire	Chief Establishment Officer
Nominated Official Member	J.R. Brown	Commissioner for Local Government
Nominated Official Member	Charles Cousins	Commissioner for Labour and Mines
Nominated Unofficial Member	Harry Franklin	Representing African Interests; Member for Education and Social Services (1955–1958)
Nominated Unofficial Member	John Moffat	Representing African Interests

==== Replacements ====
Position	Previous member	Date	New member	Notes
Nominated Official Member	K.V. Macquire	11 November 1954	W.K.H. Jones	Solicitor-General
Nominated Official Member	J.R. Brown	16 November 1954	T.G.C. Vaughan-Jones	Director of Game and Tsetse Control
Nominated Official Member	T.G.C. Vaughan-Jones	8 March 1955	C.W. Lynn	Director of Agriculture
Nominated Unofficial Member	John Moffat	8 March 1955	Killian Flynn	Representing African Interests
Nominated Official Member	W.K.H. Jones	5 July 1955	D.B. Hall	Administrative Secretary
Nominated Official Member	L.F. Leversedge	5 July 1955	G.S. Jones	Development Secretary
Nominated Official Member	C.W. Lynn	29 November 1955	K.V. Maquire	Chief Establishment Officer
Nominated Official Member	D.B. Hall	6 March 1956	H.L Jones	Administrative Secretary
Nominated Official Member	G.S. Jones	6 March 1956	L.F. Leversedge	Development Secretary
Nominated Official Member	K.V. Maquire	6 March 1956	W.G.M. Lugton	Director of Welfare and Probation Services
Nominated Unofficial Member	Killian Flynn	6 March 1956	Farquhar Baliol Macrae	Representing African Interests
Nominated Official Member	Charles Cousins	28 June 1956	R. Philpott	Labour Commissioner
Nominated Official Member	W.G.M. Lugton	28 June 1956	C.W. Lynn	Director of Agriculture
Speaker	Thomas Spurgeon Page	27 November 1956	Thomas Williams	
Nominated Official Member	C.W. Lynn	27 November 1956	William McCall	Solicitor-General
Nominated Official Member	R. Philpott	12 March 1957	Charles Cousins	Labour Commissioner
Nominated Official Member	William McCall	12 March 1957	C.W. Lynn	Director of Agriculture
Nominated Official Member	H.L Jones	12 March 1957	T.G.C. Vaughan-Jones	Commissioner for Rural Development
Nominated Official Member	C.W. Lynn	17 June 1957	K.V. Maquire	Chief Establishment Officer
Nominated Official Member	T.G.C. Vaughan-Jones	17 June 1957	J.R. Brown	Commissioner for Local Government
Nominated Official Member	–	18 March 1958	R. Philpott	Deputy Labour Commissioner
Nominated Official Member	J.R. Brown	1 July 1958	G.S. Jones	Provincial Commissioner
Nominated Official Member	R. Philpott	1 July 1958	W.K.H. Jones	Solicitor-General

=== Ex officio members ===
Position	Member
Attorney-General	W.M. McCall, Edgar Unsworth, Brian Andre Doyle
Chief Secretary to the Government	Edgar Unsworth, A.T. Williams, Ralph Nicholson, Evelyn Dennison Hone, D.B. Hall
Financial Secretary	Ralph Nicholson, H.C. Ballingall
Secretary for Native Affairs	W.F. Stubbs, D.B. Hall, G.S. Jones
