= 1929 Northern Rhodesian general election =

General elections were held in Northern Rhodesia on 31 August 1929. One issue in the elections was the proposed amalgamation of the colony with neighbouring Southern Rhodesia.

== Electoral system ==
The number of elected seats on the Legislative Council was increased from five to seven, one new constituency covering Ndola, and the constituency of Livingstone and Western now electing two members, despite only being the third largest constituency and having fewer than half the number of registered voters as Ndola.

There were a total of 3,058 registered voters, nearly three times the number in 1926.

Constituency	Settlements	Registered voters
Eastern	Fort Jameson, Lundazi, Petauke	116
Livingstone and Western	Balovale, Kalabo, Lealui, Livingstone, Mankoya, Nalolo, Sesheke	587
Midland	Feira, Lusaka, Mumbwa	258
Ndola	Kasempa, Kawambwa, Fort Rosebery, Mwinilunga, Ndola, Solwezi	1,222
Northern	Abercorn, Broken Hill, Chinsali, Isoka, Kasama, Luwingu, Mkushi, Mpika, Mporokoso, Serenje	665
Southern	Kalomo, Mazabuka, Namwala	210
Source: Legislative Council of Northern Rhodesia

== Results ==
In Livingstone Leopold Moore and Frank Lowe, who were opposed to amalgamation with Southern Rhodesia, were elected, defeating pro-amalgamation Labour Party candidates. Chad Norris, elected in Northern claimed he was not yet in favour of a merger, whilst the rural Midland and Southern constituencies returned the leading proponent of amalgamation and one opponent of the concept unopposed. Kennedy Harris, elected in Ndola was undecided on the issue, whilst Eastern member Herbert Goodhart was in favour of his region becoming part of Nyasaland. The overall results gave one member in favour, one "lukewarm" to the idea of amalgamation, three opposed and two neutral.

Constituency	Elected member
Eastern	Herbert Goodhart
Livingstone and Western	Leopold Moore
Livingstone and Western	Frank Lowe
Midland	John Brown
Ndola	Kennedy Harris
Northern	Chad Norris
Southern	Thomas Henderson Murray
Source: Davidson

== Aftermath ==
The newly elected council held its first meeting on 8 November.
