= Maureen Thelma Watson =

Member of the Southern Rhodesian Legislative Assembly for Hillside
- In office 5 June 1958 – 7 May 1965
- Preceded by: Jack Grahame Pain
- Succeeded by: Dennis Fawcett Phillips

Personal details
- Born: Maureen Thelma Eastwood; 15 September 1925 Bulawayo, Southern Rhodesia
- Died: 29 August 1994 (aged 68) Bulawayo, Zimbabwe
- Party: United Federal Party (before 1963); Rhodesia Party (after 1963)
- Spouse: Robert France Watson (m. 1945)
- Parent(s): William Hives Eastwood; Elizabeth (Dempsey) Eastwood

Maureen Thelma Watson (née Eastwood; 15 September 1925 – 29 August 1994) was a Rhodesian politician.

A Bulawayo native, she was a housewife and family planning advocate before entering politics. Elected to the Southern Rhodesian Legislative Assembly in 1958, she was the second woman ever elected to Parliament. She was reelected in 1962 but opted not to run for reelection in 1965. A member of the United Federal Party, and later the Rhodesia Party, she was a moderate who opposed the conservative agenda of the Rhodesian Front.

== Early life and family ==
Maureen Thelma Eastwood was born on 15 September 1925 in Bulawayo, Southern Rhodesia. Her parents were Elizabeth "Bessie" (née Dempsey), a Johannesburg native, and William Hives Eastwood, born in England. Her father was a businessman and Member of the Legislative Council who served as a cabinet minister of the portfolios of Health, Education, and Transport in the Federation of Rhodesia and Nyasaland. She attended Eveline High School in Bulawayo and Kingsmead College in Johannesburg, South Africa.

On 10 November 1945, she married Robert France Watson, a South African who worked for Rhodesian Railways. She became a housewife and they had one son and two daughters.

== Politics and activism ==
Before entering politics, Watson was a birth control advocate and the vice-chair of the Bulawayo Family Planning Association. In 1955, the association opened the first family planning clinic for whites in Bulawayo in the Margaret Roe Child Welfare Centre.

In the 1958 election, Watson, the United Federal Party candidate, was elected to the Southern Rhodesian Legislative Assembly, representing the Hillside constituency. She lost the first round to Dominion Party incumbent Jack Graham Pain, placing second out of three candidates. She went up against Pain in the second count, winning with 52% of the vote. This made her the second woman ever elected to Parliament (the first, Tawsie Jollie, was elected in 1923). Watson was reelected in 1962 with 56% of the vote, defeating Rhodesian Front candidate William Redpath Kinleyside. Nevertheless, Watson's United Federal Party lost power that election to Rhodesian Front, who gained a solid majority of 35 seats, compared to the UFP's 29.

In Parliament, Watson opposed racial discrimination and the conservative agenda of the Rhodesian Front, which was founded in 1962 by whites who opposed any transition toward majority black rule in Rhodesia. In 1961, she called for liquor laws to be applied equally regardless of race. She also continued her advocacy for birth control and women's autonomy. In 1963, she opposed legislation that banned "any native" from having sexual intercourse with a "white woman or girl." Watson, the sole woman MP, complained that "this Act [constitutes] an unwarranted act of paternalism by a largely male Parliament against the European women of this country."

After the United Federal Party dissolved in 1963, Watson joined the Rhodesia Party, formed by Roy Welensky and other moderates who opposed the Rhodesian Front agenda and the looming possibility of UDI. In 1964, Watson announced she would not run for reelection in 1965. In the late 1960s, she served on the board of the National Free Library of Rhodesia.

Maureen Watson died of emphysema in Bulawayo on 29 August 1994, at the age of 68.

== Electoral history ==
1958 Southern Rhodesian general election: Hillside (First count)
Party	Candidate	Votes	%	±%
Dominion Party	Jack Graham Pain	637	46.3	
United Party	Maureen Thelma Watson	510	37.0	
United	Albert John Lister Lewis	230	16.7	
Majority		127	9.3	
Turnout		1,377	76.3	

1958 Southern Rhodesian general election: Hillside (Second count)
Party	Candidate	Votes	%	±%
United Party	Maureen Thelma Watson	701	52.0	+15
Dominion Party	Jack Graham Pain	646	48.0	+1.7
Majority		55	4.0	
Turnout		1,347	74.8	−1.5

1962 Southern Rhodesian general election: Hillside
Party	Candidate	Votes	%	±%
United Party	Maureen Thelma Watson	822	55.7	+3.7
RF	William Redpath Kinleyside	653	44.3	
Majority		169	11.4	+7.4
Turnout		1,475	82.2	+7.4

Southern Rhodesian Legislative Assembly
Preceded by Jack Grahame Pain	Member of Parliament for Hillside; 1958 – 1965	Succeeded by Dennis Fawcett Phillips
