= Kumwenda (surname) =

Family name

Kumwenda is a surname of Malawian and Zambian origin associated with Tumbuka ethnic group. Notable people with the surname include:

- Mwai Kumwenda (born 1989), Malawian netball international player
- Sandros Kumwenda (born 1976), Zambian international footballer
- Bridget Kumwenda, Malawian netball international player
- Shy Kumwenda (born 1978), Zambian retired football striker
