= 1922 Northern Rhodesian amalgamation referendum =

February 1922

Results
Choice	Votes	%
Yes	310	17.95%
No	1,417	82.05%

A referendum on amalgamation with Southern Rhodesia was held in Northern Rhodesia in February 1922 alongside Advisory Council elections. The proposal was rejected by 82% of voters, who were generally in favour of the territory becoming a Crown colony with a Legislative Council.

== Campaign ==
Amalgamation was supported by Francis Chaplin, who was Administrator of both Northern and Southern Rhodesia. Opponents included Leopold Moore, a prominent politician and Advisory Council member.

== Results ==
Choice	Votes	%
For	310	17.95
Against	1,417	82.05
Invalid/blank votes		–
Total	1,727	100
Registered voters/turnout		
Source: Gelfand

== Aftermath ==
A referendum was held in Southern Rhodesia in October, with voters offered the choices of responsible government or union with South Africa, with 60% voting for the former. In July 1923 the Advisory Council officially requested that Northern Rhodesia be made a Crown colony, and in early 1924 an Order in Council was issued by the British Government, stating that the territory would get a Governor and Legislative Council. Herbert Stanley became the territory's first Governor on 1 April 1924, and a Legislative Council was created in the same year. Its members were initially appointed, until the first elections were held in 1926.
