= 1932 Northern Rhodesian general election =

General elections were held in Northern Rhodesia on 16 July 1932. Of the seven elected seats in the Legislative Council, four had only one candidate, who was elected unopposed; Herbert Goodhart in the Eastern constituency, John Brown in Midlands, Chad Norris in Northern and Thomas Henderson Murray in Southern. The only contested seats were the two in Livingstone and the one in Ndola.

== Electoral system ==
The seven elected members of the Legislative Council were elected from six constituencies; five constituencies returned a single member, whilst Livingstone and Western returned two. There were a total of 2,565 registered voters.

Constituency	Settlements	Registered voters
Eastern	Fort Jameson, Lundazi, Petauke	91
Livingstone and Western	Balovale, Kalabo, Lealui, Livingstone, Mankoya, Nalolo, Sesheke	557
Midland	Feira, Lusaka, Mumbwa	236
Ndola	Kasempa, Kawambwa, Fort Rosebery, Mwinilunga, Ndola, Solwezi	830
Northern	Abercorn, Broken Hill, Chinsali, Isoka, Kasama, Luwingu, Mkushi, Mpika, Mporokoso, Serenje	649
Southern	Kalomo, Mazabuka, Namwala	202
Source: Legislative Council of Northern Rhodesia

== Campaign ==
In Ndola incumbent member Kennedy Harris, a businessman, was challenged by Herbert Walsh, a trade unionist. In the two-member Livingstone and Western constituency, incumbents Leopold Moore (owner of Northern Rhodesia's only newspaper, The Livingstone Mail) and Frank Lowe (an accountant and mayor of Livingstone) were challenged by former Livingstone mayor Charles Knight and Deputy mayor F.D. Law.

== Results ==
Constituency	Candidates	Notes
Eastern	Herbert Goodhart	Elected unopposed
Livingstone and Western	Leopold Moore	Elected
Livingstone and Western	Charles Knight	Elected
Livingstone and Western	Frank Lowe	Unseated
Livingstone and Western	F.D. Law	
Midland	John Brown	Elected unopposed
Ndola	Kennedy Harris	Elected
Ndola	Herbert Walsh	
Northern	Chad Norris	Elected unopposed
Southern	Thomas Henderson Murray	Elected unopposed
Source: Davidson
