= List of members of the Legislative Council of Northern Rhodesia (1948–1953) =

Members of the Legislative Council of Northern Rhodesia from 1948 until 1953 were elected on 14 August 1948. The first session of the newly elected council started on 10 November. There were ten elected members, eight appointed members and six ex officio members.

== List of members ==
=== Elected members ===
Constituency	Member	Notes
Broken Hill	Roy Welensky	
Livingstone	Herbert Millar	
Luanshya	Albert Davies	
Lusaka	Ernest Sergeant	
Midland	Marais von Eeden	
Mufulira–Chingola	James Morris	
Ndola	Ewain Wilson	Member for Health and Local Government (Note: From 1 July 1949)
Nkana	George L'Ange	
North-Eastern	Frank Robertson	
South-Western	Geoffrey Beckett	Member for Agriculture and Natural Resources

==== Replacements ====
Constituency	Previous member	Date	New member
Mufulira–Chingola	James Morris	1953	Alexander Stevens

=== Nominated members ===
Position	Member	Notes
Speaker	Thomas Spurgeon Page	
African Member	Henry Kaskolo	
African Member	Nelson Nalumango	
Nominated Official Member	A.G. Knox Johnston	Director of Development
Nominated Official Member	E.F. Martin	Director of Agriculture
Nominated Official Member	P.B. Robinson	Director of Medical Services
Nominated Unofficial Member	Stewart Gore-Browne	Representing African Interests
Nominated Unofficial Member	Edward Nightingale	Representing African Interests

==== Replacements ====
Position	Previous member	Date	New member	Notes
Nominated Official Member	A.G. Knox Johnston	16 March 1949	F. Crawford	Director of Development
Nominated Official Member	E.F. Martin	16 March 1949	Charles Cousins	Commissioner for Labour and Mines
Nominated Official Member	P.B. Robinson	22 June 1949	A.T. Howell	Director of Medical Services
Nominated Official Member	A.T. Howell	12 November 1949	P.B. Robinson	Director of Medical Services
African Member	Henry Kaskolo	9 June 1951	Pascale Sokota	
African Member	Nelson Nalumango	9 June 1951	Dauti Yamba	
Nominated Official Member	F. Crawford	9 June 1951	L.F. Leversedge	Development Secretary
Nominated Official Member	Charles Cousins	9 June 1951	P.J. Law	Commissioner for Labour
Nominated Official Member	A.T. Howell	9 June 1951	T.C. Colchester	Commissioner for Local Government
Nominated Unofficial Member	Stewart Gore-Browne	9 June 1951	John Moffat	Representing African Interests
Nominated Official Member	P.J. Law	10 November 1951	J.A. Cottrell	Director of African Education
Nominated Official Member	L.F. Leversedge	28 June 1952	H.C. Ballingall	Development Secretary
Nominated Official Member	T.C. Colchester	28 June 1952	S.F. Turner	Director of Surveys and Lands
Nominated Official Member	J.A. Cottrell	28 June 1952	Charles Cousins	Commissioner for Labour and Mines
Nominated Official Member	H.C. Ballingall	8 November 1952	L.F. Leversedge	Development Secretary
Nominated Official Member	S.F. Turner	8 November 1952	William McCall	
Nominated Official Member	William McCall	6 December 1952	T.C. Colchester	Commissioner for Local Government
Nominated Official Member	T.C. Colchester	18 February 1953	W.G.M. Lugton	Director of Welfare and Probation Services
Nominated Official Member	W.G.M. Lugton	4 March 1953	K.V. Macquire	Chief Establishment Officer
Nominated Official Member	K.V. Macquire	16 April 1953	T.C. Colchester	Commissioner for Local Government
Nominated Official Member	T.C. Colchester	7 November 1953	William McCall	
Nominated Official Member	Charles Cousins	12 November 1953	P.J. Law	Commissioner for Labour and Mines

=== Ex officio members ===
Position	Member
Administrative Secretary	A.T. Williams, S.R. Denny, G.J. Phillips
Attorney-General	H.G. Morgan, A.G. Forbes, Edgar Unsworth, W.M. McCall
Chief Secretary to the Government	Robert Stanley, George Thornton, A.T. Williams, Edgar Unsworth
Economic Secretary	Ralph Nicholson, A.G. Knox Johnston, H.L. Jones
Financial Secretary	George Thornton, J.O. Talbot-Phibbs, R.M. Taylor, H.M. McDowell, H.C. Ballingball
Secretary for Native Affairs	R.S. Hudson, R.P. Bush, W.F. Stubbs
