= Davies Chama =

Zambian politician

Minister of Defence
- In office 15 September 2016 – August 2021
- President: Edgar Lungu
- Preceded by: Richwell Siamunene
- Succeeded by: Ambrose Lufuma

Nominated member of the National Assembly
- Incumbent
- Assumed office 2016

Personal details
- Born: 21 August 1964 (age 61)
- Party: Patriotic Front
- Occupation: Agriculturist

Davies Chama (born 21 August 1964) is a Zambian politician. He is currently a member of the National Assembly and a former Minister of Defence.

== Biography ==
Chama earned a diploma in agriculture and worked as an agriculturalist. After joining the Patriotic Front party, he contested the Kabwe Central seat in the 2006 general elections, but was defeated by the Movement for Multi-Party Democracy's Kayula Kakusa by a margin of 171 votes. He subsequently became chair of the party's Lusaka Province branch, and later Secretary-General.

In September 2016 Chama was appointed Minister of Defence in President Edgar Lungu's new cabinet. At the same time he was also nominated to be a member of the National Assembly.
