= 1938 Northern Rhodesian general election =

General elections were held in Northern Rhodesia in 1938. An additional unofficial member was appointed to the Legislative Council to represent African interests.

== Electoral system ==
The seven elected members of the Legislative Council were elected from seven single-member constituencies. There were a total of 3,932 registered voters.

Constituency	Settlements	Registered voters
Eastern	Fort Jameson, Lundazi, Petauke	146
Livingstone and Western	Balovale, Kalabo, Lealui, Livingstone, Mankoya, Senanga, Sesheke	367
Midland	Broken Hill (South), Lusaka, Mumbwa	541
Ndola	Fort Rosebery, Kawambwa, Luanshya Ndola	792
Nkana	Kasempa, Mufulira, Mwinilunga, Nkana, Solwezi	1,196
Northern	Abercorn, Broken Hill, Chinsali, Isoka, Kasama, Luwingu, Mkushi, Mpika, Mporokoso, Serenje	624
Southern	Kalomo, Mazabuka, Namwala	266
Source: Legislative Council of Northern Rhodesia

== Results ==
Constituency	Elected member
Eastern	Thomas Spurgeon Page
Livingstone and Western	Leopold Moore
Midland	Edward Cholmeley
Ndola	Arthur Stephenson
Nkana	Albert Smith
Northern	Roy Welensky
Southern	Richard Ernest Campbell
Source: Davidson

== Aftermath ==
Stewart Gore-Browne was appointed as the member representing African interests.

== See also ==
- List of members of the Legislative Council of Northern Rhodesia (1938–1941)
