= 1948 Northern Rhodesian general election =

General elections were held in Northern Rhodesia on 14 August 1948.

== Electoral system ==
The ten elected members of the Legislative Council (an increase from eight in the 1944 elections) were elected from ten single-member constituencies. Two new constituencies were created; Lusaka was split out of the Midland constituency, whilst Mufulira–Chingola was created by taking Mufulira from the Luanshya constituency and Chingola from the Nkana constituency.

The Livingstone and Western and Southern constituencies were reorganised into Livingstone and South-Western. There were a total of 7,086 registered voters.

Constituency	Settlements	Registered voters
Broken Hill	Broken Hill Urban, Broken Hill Rural (north)	920
Livingstone	Livingstone, Sesheke	365
Luanshya	Luanshya	714
Lusaka	All settlements within 10 miles of Lusaka Boma	809
Midland	Balovale, Broken Hill Rural (South), Kabompo, Kasempa, Lusaka Rural, Mumbwa, Mwinilunga, Serenje, Solwezi	321
Mufulira–Chingola	Chingola, Mufulira	1,211
Ndola	Ndola Rural, Ndola Urban	795
Nkana	Kitwe	1,064
North-Eastern	Abercorn, Chinsali, Fort Jameson, Fort Rosebery, Isoka, Kasama, Kawambwa, Lundazi, Luwingu, Mpika, Mporokoso, Petauke	452
South-Western	Gwembe, Kalabo, Kalomo, Mankoya, Mazabuka, Mongu Namwala, Senanga	435
Source: Legislative Council of Northern Rhodesia

== Results ==
Constituency	Candidate	Votes	%	Notes
Broken Hill	Roy Welensky	Unopposed		Re-elected
Livingstone	Herbert Millar			Elected
Livingstone	Cuthbert Garret			
Luanshya	Albert Davies			Elected
Luanshya	Harold Webb			
Lusaka	Ernest Sergeant			Elected
Lusaka	Alexander Scott			
Lusaka	Clarence Lewis			
Midland	Marais von Eeden			Elected
Midland	Clifford Kelly			
Mufulira–Chingola	James Morris			Elected
Mufulira–Chingola	Gladys Douglas			
Mufulira–Chingola	Alexander Stevens			
Ndola	Ewain Wilson	Unopposed		Elected
Nkana	George L'Ange			Elected
Nkana	Brian Goodwin			Defeated
North-Eastern	Frank Robertson	Unopposed		Elected
South-Western	Geoffrey Beckett	Unopposed		Elected
Source: East Africa and Rhodesia

== See also ==
- List of members of the Legislative Council of Northern Rhodesia (1948–53)
