= 1935 Northern Rhodesian general election =

General elections were held in Northern Rhodesia on 16 September 1935.

== Electoral system ==
The seven elected members of the Legislative Council were elected from seven single-member constituencies, with the Ndola seat split into two to form the new constituency of Nkana; Livingstone and Western had previously elected two members, but was reduced to one. There were a total of 3,203 registered voters.

Constituency	Settlements	Registered voters
Eastern	Fort Jameson, Lundazi, Petauke	144
Livingstone and Western	Balovale, Kalabo, Lealui, Livingstone, Mankoya, Senanga, Sesheke	334
Midland	Broken Hill (South), Lusaka, Mumbwa	376
Ndola	Fort Rosebery, Kawambwa, Luanshya Ndola	862
Nkana	Kasempa, Mufulira, Mwinilunga, Nkana, Solwezi	713
Northern	Abercorn, Broken Hill, Chinsali, Isoka, Kasama, Luwingu, Mkushi, Mpika, Mporokoso, Serenje	547
Southern	Kalomo, Mazabuka, Namwala	227
Source: Legislative Council of Northern Rhodesia

== Results ==
Voter turnout was 80% in the east and midland areas, 72% in Ndola and the south, 70% in the north and 50% in Nkana.

Constituency	Candidate	Votes	%	Notes
Broken Hill	Stewart Gore-Browne	253	69.32	Elected
Broken Hill	Arthur Davison	112	30.68	
Eastern	John Bruce	80	66.12	Elected
Eastern	Thomas Spurgeon Page	41	33.88	
Livingstone and Western	Leopold Moore	Unopposed		Elected
Midland	John Brown	135	38.03	Elected
Midland	Charles Fitzwilliams	134	37.75	
Midland	Edward Cholmeley	86	24.23	
Ndola	Arthur Stephenson	243	37.79	Elected
Ndola	John Burney	230	35.77	
Ndola	Benjamin Rout	170	26.44	
Nkana	Catherine Olds	207	53.63	Elected
Nkana	Harold Webb	179	46.37	
Southern	Charles Knight	95	60.13	Elected
Southern	Thomas Henderson Murray	63	39.87	
Source: East Africa

== Aftermath ==
The newly elected Legislative Council met for the first time on 16 November 1935.
