= Tutwa Ngulube =

Zambian politician (1979–2022)

Member of the National Assembly for Kabwe Central
- In office 2016–2021
- Preceded by: James Kapyanga
- Succeeded by: Chrizoster Halwindi

Personal details
- Born: 12 April 1979 Lusaka, Zambia
- Died: 3 December 2022 (aged 43) Chongwe District, Zambia
- Party: Patriotic Front
- Profession: Businessman, barrister

Tutwa Sandani Ngulube (12 April 1979 to 3 December 2022) was a Zambian barrister and politician. He served as Member of the National Assembly for Kabwe Central from 2016 to 2021.

== Biography ==
Ngulube was born at the University Teaching Hospital in Lusaka in 1979 to Onesmus Sandani Ngulube and Miriam Tivwale Mtonga Ngulube. He attended Woodlands A Primary School and was then a boarder at Choma Secondary School. He then attended the University of Zambia, where he graduated with a LL.B. After graduating in 2004, he enrolled in a human rights course at the American University in Cairo from 2005 to 2007. He was then admitted to the bar in 2007. He subsequently worked as a lawyer for F.B. Nanguzgambo and Associates before entering politics. He married Glendah Sokontwe Ngulube, with whom he had five children.

During his first degree Ngulube joined the Forum for Democracy and Development. He joined the Patriotic Front in 2004. He was chosen as Patriotic Front candidate for Kabwe Central for the 2016 general elections ahead of sitting MP James Kapyanga, and was elected to the National Assembly with a 10,000 majority.

After becoming an MP, Ngulube joined the Committee on Delegated Legislation and the Committee on Legal Affairs, Human Rights, National Guidance, Gender Matters and Governance. He lost his seat to Chrizoster Halwindi of the United Party for National Development in the 2021 general elections.

Ngulube died on 3 December 2022 of a suspected heart attack.

== See also ==
- Naomie Pilula
- Chaloka Beyani
- Keith Mukata
