= Naomi Chanda =

Zambian farmer and agriculture trainer

Naomi Chanda is a Zambian farmer and agriculture trainer based in Chinsali, northern Zambia. She works with the Campaign for Female Education (Camfed) to teach climate-smart agricultural techniques and supports girls' education and empowerment through her community initiatives.

== Early life and education ==
Chanda was born in northern Zambia and raised in the Chinsali district by her mother after her father died when she was an infant. Her mother faced challenges in providing for Naomi's education, including the costs of school fees, uniforms, and other essentials. Chanda attended primary and secondary school, although her education was at risk due to financial difficulties.

In secondary school, her situation became increasingly precarious until Camfed stepped in to provide financial support for her education. This assistance covered school fees, uniforms, and materials, allowing her to complete her schooling.

== Career ==
After completing secondary school in 2016, Chanda joined the Camfed Association, a network of women educated with support from the organization. She initially trained as a learner guide, delivering life skills and self-development sessions to students in her community. These sessions, part of the "My Better World" curriculum, aimed to improve students' confidence, problem-solving abilities, and awareness of their rights and responsibilities.

Chanda expanded her focus to address broader community needs by becoming an Agriculture Guide at Camfed’s climate-smart demonstration farm in Chinsali, established on land provided by a local chief. The farm serves as a center for training young women in sustainable farming techniques. Chanda and her colleagues promote practices such as planting drought-resistant crops, using manure instead of chemical fertilizers, and integrating agroecological techniques.

Chanda has trained over 150 women and girls in adapting agricultural practices to climate change. She also conducts community outreach programs, teaching farming techniques to local smallholder farmers and schoolchildren. These efforts aim to build resilience against environmental challenges such as prolonged droughts and erratic rainfall.

Her leadership roles within the Camfed Association include serving as the district chairperson in 2019 and later as the national chairperson for Zambia in 2022. These positions involved advocating for educational re-entry policies for girls and supporting community initiatives. In 2024, Chanda was featured on the BBC’s 100 Women list.

== Personal life ==
Chanda supports vulnerable girls by covering their school fees and providing uniforms and other essentials. She operates a small home furnishing business, using the profits to assist disadvantaged children in her community. Chanda converted her family home into a shelter for girls, providing a safe space for those at risk of early marriage and supporting their educational pursuits.
