= Ministry of Commerce, Trade and Industry =

Government ministry of Zambia

Coordinates: 15°25′20″S 28°17′25″E

- Coat of arms of Zambia

Ministry overview
- Type: Ministry
- Jurisdiction: Government of Zambia
- Headquarters: New Government Complex 8th, 9th and 10th Floors, Nasser Road P.O. Box 31968 Lusaka, Zambia
- Annual budget: ZMW. 318.3 million (2016)
- Ministry executive: Minister of Commerce, Trade and Industry
- Website: Homepage

The Ministry of Commerce, Trade and Industry (MCTI) is a cabinet level government ministry of Zambia. It is responsible for the development of a globally competitive, sustainable, commercial, trade and industrial base in Zambia with the objective of contributing to social and economic development in the country. The ministry is headed by the Minister Commerce, Trade and Industry.

== Location ==
The headquarters of the MCTI are located on the eighth, ninth and tenth Floors of the New Government Complex, in the Lusaka neighbourhood of Cathedral Hill.

== Overview ==
The ministry is headed by a cabinet minister, assisted by a deputy minister, both of whom are political appointees. The Permanent Secretary, a career civil servant, oversees the five departments of the ministry. Each of the five departments is headed by a departmental director.

- Department of Foreign Trade
- Department of Domestic Trade
- Department of Human Resources and Administration
- Department of Planning and Information
- Department of Industry

The MCTI works in collaboration with the following government agencies:

1. Zambia Bureau of Standards
2. Zambia Development Agency
3. Zambia Metrology Agency
4. Patents and Companies Registration Agency
5. Citizens Economic Empowerment Commission
6. Competition and Consumer Protection Commission

== List of ministers ==
Minister	Party	Term start	Term end
Minister of Commerce and Industry
Alexander Grey Zulu	United National Independence Party	1964	
Commerce, Trade & Industry
Ronald Penza	Movement for Multi-Party Democracy	1991	1993
Enoch Kavindele	Movement for Multi-Party Democracy	1997	1998
Felix Mutati	Movement for Multi-Party Democracy	2006	2011
Emmanuel Chenda	Patriotic Front	2013	2014
Margaret Mwanakatwe	Patriotic Front	2015	2018
Christopher Yaluma	Patriotic Front	2018	2021
Chipoka Mulenga	United Party for National Development	2021	2026

=== Deputy ministers ===
Deputy Minister	Party	Term start	Term end
Deputy Minister of Commerce, Trade and Industry
Paul Tembo	Movement for Multi-Party Democracy	1992	
