= Ronald Penza =

Zambian politician

Ronald Damson Siame Penza (3 September 1949 – 6 November 1998) was a Zambian politician. His assassination in 1998 after falling out with the ruling president caused controversy across Zambia. While officially closed, many believe that Penza's murder is still unsolved.

== Biography ==
He was born in 1949 in Mbala, Northern Province. In the 1991 parliamentary election, he ran as a candidate of the Movement for Multiparty Democracy (MMD) for a seat in Parliament, winning the Munali constituency with 82 percent of the vote against Rupiah Banda.

After the election of Frederick Chiluba as President of Zambia in 1991, Penza was appointed Minister of Commerce, Trade and Industry. Following a cabinet reshuffle in 1993 he was appointed as Minister of Finance. In these roles, he was largely responsible for the dismantling of the established policies of President Kenneth Kaunda's socialist planned economy. That year, he went on a diplomatic mission to Japan. In 1994 he was nominated by the financial magazine Euro Money, published by the World Bank and the International Monetary Fund, as the second best finance minister in the world. He oversaw a program of privatization, which was one of the most radical in Africa, until his dismissal by Chiluba in March 1998 due to political differences.

=== Assassination ===
A few months later, he was killed by armed intruders at his home in the affluent area of Ibex Hill in Lusaka. The police announced he was the victim of a robbery and the five armed criminals were shot dead in a police action to arrest them. However, there was speculation that his murder occurred in a context of trade in arms and drug-smuggling by leading politicians such as Vice President Christon Tembo and former Minister of Defence Benjamin Mwila. Speculation remains in Zambia and that Penza's death was improperly investigated, and that the extrajudicial killings of the suspects involved are a breach of human rights.
