= 1954 Southern Rhodesian general election =

General elections were held in Southern Rhodesia on 27 January 1954 for the seats in the Southern Rhodesian Legislative Assembly. The result was a victory for the United Rhodesia Party, which won 26 of the 30 seats. The candidates of the Rhodesia Labour Party and Southern Rhodesia Labour Party ran as independents.

== Results ==
| Party | Votes | % | Seats | +/– |
|---|---|---|---|---|
| United Rhodesia Party | 15,631 | 55.88 | 26 | +2 |
| Confederate Party | 6,232 | 22.28 | 0 | New |
| Independent Labour | 1,148 | 4.10 | 1 | New |
| Independent Rhodesia Party | 800 | 2.86 | 1 | New |
| Independents | 4,163 | 14.88 | 2 | New |
| Total | 27,974 | 100.00 | 30 | 0 |
| Valid votes | 27,974 | 99.66 | | |
| Invalid/blank votes | 95 | 0.34 | | |
| Total votes | 28,069 | 100.00 | | |
| Registered voters/turnout | 40,745 | 68.89 | | |
Source: Willson
