= 1926 Northern Rhodesian general election =

General elections were held in Northern Rhodesia on 22 May 1926 to elect the Legislative Council for the first time. A further four members were appointed by the Governor in September 1926.

== Electoral system ==
The Legislative Council Ordinance 1925 published in June 1925 provided for the election of members to the Legislative Council, which had been established in 1924. Five constituencies were created: Eastern, Livingstone and Western, Midland, Northern and Southern. Voting was restricted to British subjects, with suffrage granted to men aged 21 or over and women aged 25 or over, as long as they had lived in their constituency for at least six months and had property worth £250 or an annual salary of at least £200. There were a total of 1,036 registered voters.

Constituency	Settlements	Registered voters
Eastern	Abercorn, Chiengi, Chinsali, Fort Jameson, Fort Rosebery, Kasama, Kawambwa, Lundazi, Luwingu, Mpika, Mporokoso, Petauke, Serenje	170
Livingstone & Western	Balovale, Kalabo, Lealui, Livingstone, Mankoya, Nalolo, Sesheke	331
Midland	Feira, Lusaka, Mumbwa	159
Northern	Broken Hill, Kasempa, Mkushi, Mwinilunga, Ndola, Solwezi	201
Southern	Kalomo, Mazabuka, Namwala	175
Source: Legislative Council of Northern Rhodesia

== Campaign ==
In two constituencies, Eastern and Livingstone and Western, there was only one candidate, both of whom were elected unopposed. Two candidates ran in Northern and Southern, whilst three ran in Midland.

== Results ==
Constituency	Candidates	Votes	%	Notes
Eastern	Herbert Goodhart			Unopposed
Livingstone and Western	Leopold Moore			Unopposed
Midland	Douglas Stirke			Elected
Midland	John Powell			
Midland	Edward Copeman			
Northern	Louis Gordon	105	66.0	Elected
Northern	William Doull	54	34.0	
Southern	Thomas Henderson Murray			Elected
Southern	Frederick Clarke			
Nominated	Henry Parkin			
Nominated	John Smith			
Nominated	Arthur Stephenson			
Nominated	Tudor Trevor			
Source: Northern Rhodesia Gazette 1926, East Africa
