= Patrick Musonda =

Zambian politician

Member of the National Assembly for Kabwe Central
- In office 2002–2006
- Preceded by: Austin Chewe
- Succeeded by: Kayula Kakusa

Personal details
- Born: 4 June 1964 (age 61)
- Political party: Heritage Party (until 2002); MMD (after 2002)
- Profession: Businessman

Patrick Bulasho Musonda (born 4 June 1964) is a Zambian politician. He served as Member of the National Assembly for Kabwe Central from 2002 until 2006.

== Biography ==
Musonda contested the 2001 general elections as the Heritage Party candidate in Kabwe Central, and was elected to the National Assembly. In 2002 he was expelled from the party for voting for the Movement for Multi-Party Democracy (MMD) candidate for Speaker Amusaa Mwanamwambwa. Musonda subsequently joined the MMD and was re-elected in a by-election on 28 August 2002. However, he was not selected as the MMD candidate for the 2006 general elections.

Musonda became the party's National Youth Chairman, but he was suspended from the party in 2011.
