= Golden Mwila =

Zambian politician (born 1974)

Honorable Golden Mwila

Elected member of the National Assembly
- Incumbent
- Assumed office 2021
- Constituency: Mufulira

Personal details
- Born: Golden Mwila; 17 December 1974 (age 51) Kitwe, Zambia
- Party: Patriotic Front
- Spouse: Hilda Ngulube - Mwila
- Children: 3

Golden Mwila (born 17 December 1974) is a Zambian politician and Member of Parliament for Mufulira. He was elected to Parliament in 2021.

== Early life ==
Mwila was born on 17 December 1974, at Chimwemwe Clinic in Kitwe in the Copperbelt Province of Zambia to Mr Golden Kampasa Mwila and Mrs Lafe Chisala Mwila. He was born in a family of nine, seven boys and two girls.

He spent early years in Kitwe and Mwansabombwe before moving to Mufulira District at the age of four.

== Education ==
Mwila did his primary school at Buyantanshi Primary School in Mufulira. He did his grades 8 and 9 at Mufulira Secondary School and completed his high school at Hillcrest Technical Secondary School.

In 1999, Mwila obtained a Bachelors degree from the Copperbelt University. He also holds a Master of Business Administration from Edinburgh Business School as well as a Law Degree from the University of Lusaka. He is a Chartered Accountant and fellow member of ACCA.

== Politics ==
Mwila was elected to the National Assembly of Zambia in August 2021. He is a member of the Public Accounts Committee (since September 2023) and was previously a member of two other committees, namely the Parliamentary Committee on Sport, Youth and Child Matters and the Parliamentary Committee on Education, Science and Technology.

Mwila first had early interest in politics when Zambia returned to a Multi-party political system at the beginning of 1990s. He participated in election monitoring in the 1996 General Elections.

After that, he had joined in student politics while studying at the Copperbelt University (CBU). In 1999, he won elections as a student leader in the Student Council and served as Treasurer.

In 2006, he joined the Patriotic Front party of Michael Sata. In 2016, he applied to contest for the Mwansabombwe Parliamentary Constituency seat on the Patriotic Front party ticket but was not adopted by his party. The party opted to adopt the incumbent Rogers Mwewa.

In 2021, he applied to contest for the Mufulira Parliamentary Constituency seat on the Patriotic Front party ticket and was adopted. He won the elections held later that year in August 2021 defeating six other candidates. Currently, he serves on the Public Accounts Committee in the National Assembly of Zambia.

== Personal life ==
Mwila is married and has three children. He has a biography book titled; “The future my father lived”. He is a member of the United Church of Zambia (UCZ).
