= Sandros Kumwenda =

Zambian footballer (born 1976)

Personal information
- Date of birth: 27 July 1976 (age 50)
- Place of birth: Lundazi, Zambia
- Position: Midfielder

Senior career*
Years	Team	Apps	(Gls)
- Chipata
199x–2003	Dynamos Harare		
2004	Mighty Wanderers F.C.		

International career
1999–2000	Zambia	4	(0)
- * Club domestic league appearances and goals

Sandros Kumwenda (born 27 July 1976 in Lundazi) is a Zambian international footballer.

== Career ==
Sandros Kumwenda began his professional career for the Chipata amateur side. Later he played for the Dynamos Harare and Mighty Wanderers F.C.

== Honours ==
- Zimbabwe Premier Soccer League:

Runners-up: 1999

- Zimbabwean Charity Shield:

Winners: 2002.
