= Confederate Party =

Political party in the Federation of Rhodesia and Nyasaland

The Confederate Party was a political party in the Federation of Rhodesia and Nyasaland.

== History ==
The party was formed in 1953 as a successor to the Democratic Party by opponents of the Federation.

In the 1953 federal elections the party contested seats in all three territories, but only won one seat in Southern Rhodesia, where Dendy Young was elected in Sebakwe. In the Southern Rhodesian general elections in January 1954 it failed to win a seat, but in the February 1954 general elections in Northern Rhodesia, two supporters of the party (John Gaunt and Frank Derby) won seats running as independents.

The party largely disintegrated after its defeat in the 1953 federal elections, and was succeeded by the Dominion Party, which was established in 1956. However, a rump of the Confederate Party continued to exist and contested one seat in the 1958 federal elections.
