= Mufulira (constituency) =

Constituency of the National Assembly of Zambia

Mufulira is a constituency of the National Assembly of Zambia. It covers the southern part of Mufulira and a rural area to the south and east of the town in Mufulira District of Copperbelt Province.

The constituency was created in 1954 when Mufulira–Chingola was split into two constituencies.

== List of MPs ==
Election year	MP	Party
1954	Lewin Tucker	Federal Party
1959	Pieter Wulff	United Federal Party
1962	Pieter Wulff	United Federal Party
1964	John Chisata	United National Independence Party
Seat abolished (split into Mufulira East and Mufulira West)
1973	Joseph Mutale	United National Independence Party
1978	David Lunda	United National Independence Party
1983	Edgar Godfrey	United National Independence Party
1988	Mary Chisala	United National Independence Party
1991	Fabian Kasonde	Movement for Multi-Party Democracy
1994 (by-election)	Kaunda Lembalemba	Movement for Multi-Party Democracy
1996	Kaunda Lembalemba	Movement for Multi-Party Democracy
2001	Kaunda Lembalemba	Movement for Multi-Party Democracy
2006	Marjory Masiye	Patriotic Front
2011	John Kufuna	Patriotic Front
2016	Evans Chibanda	Patriotic Front
2021	Golden Mwila	Patriotic Front
2026	Elijah Biyete	United Party for National Development
