= Paul Tembo =

Zambian politician

Deputy Minister in the President's Office
- In office 1993–
- Preceded by: Edward Chisha

Deputy Minister of Finance
- In office 1993–1993
- Preceded by: Derick Chitala
- Succeeded by: Shiabyungwe Shengamo

Deputy Minister of Commerce, Trade and Industry
- In office 1992–
- Preceded by: Dipak Patel
- Succeeded by: Shiabyungwe Shengamo

Member of the National Assembly for Kabwe
- In office 1991–1996
- Preceded by: Wilfred Wonani
- Succeeded by: Austin Chewe

Personal details
- Died: 6 July 2001 Lusaka, Zambia
- Party: Movement for Multi-Party Democracy

Paul Simon Tembo (died 6 July 2001) was a Zambian politician. He served as Member of the National Assembly for Kabwe from 1991 until 1996, and as Deputy Minister of Finance.

== Biography ==
Tembo became a member of the Movement for Multi-Party Democracy and was elected to the National Assembly in Kabwe in the 1991 general elections. In 1992 he was appointed Deputy Minister of Commerce, Trade and Industry. However, he was replaced by Shiabyungwe Shengamo after less than a year in post. In 1993 he became Deputy Minister of Finance, before being moved to Deputy Minister in the President's Office later in the year.

Prior to the 1996 general elections Tembo was chosen as the MMD's candidate despite opposition from local activists who supported Austin Chewe. However, Chewe ran as an independent and defeated Tembo. He was a campaign manager for President Frederick Chiluba as he sought to change the constitution to allow a third term in office.

However, after losing an election to become Vice Chairman of the MMD, Tembo resigned from the party and subsequently joined the opposition Forum for Democracy and Development party, becoming a member of its executive.

In 2001 Tembo was due to testify to a tribunal investigating three ministers for misappropriation. However, he was shot dead at his home in Lusaka in the early morning of 6 July.
