= Kayula Kakusa =

Zambian politician

Member of the National Assembly for Kabwe Central
- In office 2006–2011
- Preceded by: Patrick Musonda
- Succeeded by: James Kapyanga

Personal details
- Born: 4 March 1964 (age 61)
- Political party: Movement for Multi-Party Democracy

Kayula Kakusa (born 4 March 1964) is a Zambian politician. He served as Member of the National Assembly for Kabwe Central from 2006 until 2011.

== Biography ==
Kakusa contested the 2006 general elections as the Movement for Multi-Party Democracy (MMD) candidate in Kabwe Central. In a close three-way contest, he was elected, defeating Davies Chama of the Patriotic Front by 171 votes, succeeding the MMD's Patrick Musonda as the MP for Kabwe.

Kakusa did not stand for re-election in the 2011 general elections. The MMD subsequently lost the seat to James Kapyanga of the Patriotic Front.
