= Greater South Africa =

Territories of a white-dominated South Africa

During the late 19th century and early 20th century, a number of South African and British political leaders advocated for a Greater South Africa. This irredentism can be regarded as an early form of Pan-Africanism, albeit strictly limited to White Africans of European ancestry.

== Theoretical planning ==
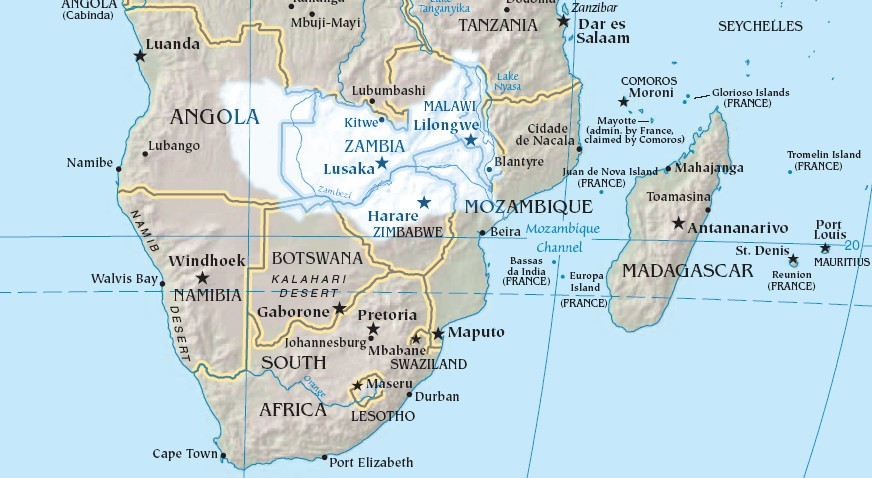
Map shows the location of River Zambesi, the hypothetical border river of an enlarged South African state.

Statesman Jan Smuts repeatedly had called for South African expansion since 1895, envisioning a future South African border along the river Zambesi or even the equator. German South-West Africa, Southern Rhodesia, and at least the southern parts of Portuguese Mozambique (especially the port of Lourenço Marques in the Delagoa Bay) along with the High Commission Territories (Basutoland, Bechuanaland and Eswatini, the last one having been a Transvaal protectorate from 1890–99) were to be included in this state, with Pretoria now being its geographical capital. Although the initial objective of Smuts' expansion plan was the Zambesi, he took great geopolitical interest in the East Africa Protectorate and Tanganyika. Smuts was impressed with the British colonists of the White Highlands and believed that the area could be transformed into a "great European state or system of states" in the near future, eventually leading to a "chain of white states which will in the end become one from the Union to Kenya". Smuts believed this expansion would finally lead South Africa to become "one of the greatest future Dominions of the Empire", the equal of Australia and Canada.

Smuts' expansionist aims received weak domestic white support. Afrikaner nationalists feared that the incorporation of British territories near South Africa would result in a state with a much larger black majority than in the then-current Union of South Africa.

== Actualization ==
The formation of the Union of South Africa in 1910 was seen as the first step in bringing about the unification of the British-held territories in Southern Africa. The British initially supported the territorial enlargement of the South African State. Neither the British nor the South Africans expected London's continuing imperial responsibility for Rhodesia, Nyasaland and the High Commission Territories to be the ultimate territorial arrangement: the South Africa Act 1909 made provisions for admitting Rhodesia as a fifth province of the Union in the future, and laid out the terms for the potential future transfer of the High Commission Territories. Prime Minister Louis Botha agreed with Smuts that the South African annexation of the High Commission Territories was only a matter of time.

The British approved Smuts' war aims during the South-West Africa Campaign of 1914-1915, and supported the mandate of German South-West Africa to South Africa in 1919, although Smuts looked to formally incorporating the territory. He suggested naming this new territory Bothaland after the Prime Minister. Even future fulfilment of the territorial objects in Portuguese Mozambique – by the means of a purchase approved unanimously by the South African cabinet – were looked upon favorably, despite Portugal being a member of the Entente.

However, the Southern Rhodesian government referendum of 1922 saw the colony of Southern Rhodesia reject joining the Union. This decision made the South African acquisition of the British South African Company rights in Bechuanaland unnecessary, and thus its transfer to the Union was halted. Rhodesia, functioning as a British counterweight to Afrikaner dominance, had laid claims to at least a part of Bechuanaland, and thus it was increasingly in British interests to transfer the latter from the South African sphere of influence. The British were also disappointed with the South African parliament passing the Natives Land Act, which created the land tenure system which eventually became one of the foundations of Apartheid.

Without Rhodesia, Smuts' projections for further South African expansion northward became impossible to actualize and his aspirations towards Mozambique difficult to accomplish. The South African general election of 1924 brought the end of Smuts' premiership and the election of J. B. M. Hertzog as the new prime minister. The British were suspicious of the anti-imperial and pro-Afrikaner Hertzog compared to the anglophile Smuts, and became less willing to meet South African territorial demands.

In the Afrikaner-dominated Apartheid South Africa (1948-1994), especially under the premiership of Hendrik Verwoerd (in office 1958-1966), the concept of an incorporation of Southern African territories into a white-dominated South Africa revived, aiming now at Botswana, Lesotho and Swaziland which became independent from the United Kingdom in 1966-1968.

== See also ==
- Pink Map
