= Austin Chewe =

Zambian politician

Member of the National Assembly for Kabwe
- In office 1996–2001
- Preceded by: Paul Tembo
- Succeeded by: Patrick Musonda

Personal details
- Party: Independent
- Profession: Businessman

Austin C. Chewe is a Zambian businessman and politician. He served as Member of the National Assembly for Kabwe from 1996 until 2001.

== Biography ==
Chewe served in the Zambian Army, reaching the rank of captain and managing The Sentries, an army-based band. After leaving the army, he became a businessman. He ran as an independent candidate in the 1996 general elections and was elected to the National Assembly in Kabwe, defeating incumbent MP Paul Tembo. He later joined the Forum for Democracy and Development and ran unsuccessfully for the position of chairman in 2001.

Chewe did not stand for re-election in the 2001 general elections and subsequently joined the Movement for Multi-Party Democracy (MMD). He was expelled from the party in 2005, but readmitted in 2006. Later in the year he was the MMD candidate in Munali in the 2006 general elections. However, he was beaten by Chilufya Mumbi of the Patriotic Front. Chewe later switched his support to the Patriotic Front, campaigning for Edgar Lungu in the 2015 presidential elections.
