= 1922 Southern Rhodesian government referendum =

Failed plebiscete on joining the Union of South Africa

- 27 October 1922
- Are you in favour of Southern Rhodesia being incorporated as a Province in the Union of South Africa?
- Outcome: Establishment of Responsible Government in Southern Rhodesia

Results
Choice	Votes	%
Yes	5,989	40.57%
No	8,774	59.43%
Valid votes	14,763	99.37%
Invalid or blank votes	93	0.63%
Total votes	14,856	100.00%
Registered voters/turnout	18,810	78.98%
Yes	40.57%
No	59.43%
Invalid	0.63%
- Results by electoral district

A referendum on the status of Southern Rhodesia was held in the colony on 27 October 1922. Voters, almost all of them white, were given the options of establishing responsible government or joining the Union of South Africa. After 59% voted in favour of responsible government, it was officially granted on 1 October 1923 with the implementation of the First Cabinet of Southern Rhodesia.

The referendum came eight months after the 1922 Northern Rhodesian amalgamation referendum, where Northern Rhodesia had voted against union with Southern Rhodesia.

== Background ==
The referendum arose after the 1920 Legislative Council elections resulted in a majority which favoured immediate moves towards establishing responsible government within the colony. Immediately after the election, the Legislative Council passed a resolution requesting the British Government to inaugurate responsible government, and the United Kingdom's response was establishing a Commission under The 1st Earl Buxton, a former Liberal minister and former Governor-General of South Africa.

The Buxton Commission reported in 1921 that the Colony was ready for responsible government and that a referendum should be held to confirm it. A delegation was sent from the Legislative Council to negotiate with the Colonial Office on the form of the constitution. The delegation comprised Sir Charles Coghlan, W. M. Leggate, John McChlery, R. A. Fletcher, and Sir Francis Newton. At the 1920 election there had been three schools of opinion in Southern Rhodesia, one favouring responsible government inside Southern Rhodesia, one favouring a continuation of rule through the British South Africa Company, and the third believing that the best solution would be to seek membership of the Union of South Africa. The British South Africa Company option dropped out of consideration, but the Buxton Commission had said that its recommendations should not preclude consideration of joining South Africa if this was favoured by voters.

The Southern Rhodesians did petition the Colonial Office to inquire what circumstances the Union of South Africa would admit them, as this option had received some support (especially in Matabeleland) at the election. Representatives of the Southern Rhodesian administration visited Cape Town to confer with Jan Smuts, who after some delay was willing to offer terms he considered reasonable and which were also acceptable to the United Kingdom government. In accordance with the wishes of Winston Churchill (the Secretary of State for the Colonies in London), the Southern Rhodesians decided to invite the electorate to make the decision. Although they did not try to interfere in the referendum, opinion among the United Kingdom government, the South African government and the British South Africa Company favoured the union option.

== Arrangements ==
The election used the existing Legislative Council electoral roll and votes were counted in the electoral districts used for the Legislative Council elections. However, there was one minor change, with voters entitled to cast their votes in whichever district they wanted, regardless of where they were registered.

Black voters were excluded from the referendum by the property qualifications used in existing electoral legislation.

== Campaign ==
The Responsible Government Association led by Charles Coghlan was the primary organisation opposing amalgamation with South Africa. Their campaign received support from the Southern Rhodesian Civil Service and the British South Africa Police.

Women played a key role in the campaign, having only recently received an equal franchise to men. A separate women's branch of the Responsible Government Association was organised, and according to one source 75 percent of women's votes were cast in favour of responsible government.

Local support for union with South Africa was primarily drawn from business groups and the small local Afrikaner population. Amalgamation was favoured by the British and South African governments, although the British government remained neutral during the campaign. Smuts openly campaigned in favour of unification, in line with his white nationalist views favouring a white-dominated Greater South Africa within the British Empire. In contrast, South African opposition leader J. B. M. Hertzog viewed unification as unconstitutional and criticised the lack of consultation with the existing South African provinces.

== Results ==
All but one of the electoral districts supported responsible government and rejected Union with South Africa. The one district to support a Union with South Africa was Marandellas, and this was by a slim margin.

Map of the referendum results in Southern Rhodesia against the wider political backdrop in British southern Africa. Southern Rhodesia had been voting on whether to join the Union of South Africa (black). At the time of the vote, South-West Africa was also a mandate of South Africa.

Choice	Votes	%
Responsible government	8,774	59.43
Union with South Africa	5,989	40.57
Total	14,763	100.00
Valid votes	14,763	99.37
Invalid/blank votes	93	0.63
Total votes	14,856	100.00
Registered voters/turnout	18,810	78.98
Source: Passmore

=== By district ===
District	Responsible government		Union with South Africa	
District	Votes	%	Votes	%
Bulawayo District	551	65.0	297	35.0
Bulawayo North	826	67.9	390	32.1
Bulawayo South	955	64.0	538	36.0
Eastern	711	57.5	526	42.5
Gwelo	582	57.3	433	42.7
Hartley	449	66.5	226	33.5
Marandellas	433	49.4	443	50.6
Midlands	550	51.9	509	48.1
Northern	741	60.3	487	39.7
Salisbury District	845	57.3	629	42.7
Salisbury Town	894	63.8	507	36.2
Victoria	626	51.7	585	48.3
Western	611	59.3	419	40.7
Total	8,774	59.4	5,989	40.6

== Analysis ==
Demographic concerns were a key factor in the rejection of union with South Africa, with most voters being of British origin and fearing their interests would be ignored by the politically dominant Afrikaners in South Africa. South Africa was perceived as politically unstable, particularly following the Rand Rebellion earlier in 1922, and many voters believed that official bilingualism would reduce the status of English in Southern Rhodesia in favour of Afrikaans. There were also concerns over the proposed terms of unificaiton, which would result in major policy matters being transferred to the South African government and being taken away from local control.

The 1922 referendum has been cited as a source of anti-British sentiment among later Zimbabwean nationalists, who perceived the British government as having enabled white minority domination of the African majority. According to Bishi (2023), "Africans perceived the 1922 referendum and the subsequent settler-led administrations as integral components of an imperial and colonial machinery designed to subjugate and exploit the black majority". In 1977, ZAPU leader Joshua Nkomo described the vote as a "fictitious referendum [...] I say fictious because the people of the country did not take part in it".
