= James Kapyanga =

Zambian politician (1963–2021)

Deputy Minister of Transport, Works, Supply and Communications
- In office 2015–2015
- Preceded by: Richwell Siamunene

Deputy Minister of Transport and Communications
- In office 2015–2016

Member of the National Assembly for Kabwe Central
- In office 2011–2016
- Preceded by: Kayula Kakusa
- Succeeded by: Tutwa Ngulube

Personal details
- Born: 31 May 1963
- Died: October 2021 (aged 58)
- Political party: Patriotic Front
- Profession: Machinist, trade union leader

James Mambepa Kapyanga (31 May 1963 – October 2021) was a Zambian politician. He served as Member of the National Assembly for Kabwe Central from 2011 until 2016 and was a Deputy Minister between 2015 and 2016.

== Biography ==
Kapyanga earned a Higher Certificate in Comparative Labour Relations and became General Secretary of the Railway Workers' Union of Zambia. He also worked as a machinist.

Kapyanga was the Patriotic Front candidate for Kabwe Central in the 2011 general elections and was elected to the National Assembly. In August 2015 he was appointed Deputy Minister of Transport, Works, Supply and Communications, after the incumbent Deputy Minister Richwell Siamunene was made Minister of Defence.

When the Ministry of Transport, Works, Supply and Communications was split into the Ministry of Transport and Communications and the Ministry of Supply and Works later in 2015, Kapyanga became Deputy Minister of Transport and Communications. However, he was not selected as the Patriotic Front candidate for the 2016 general elections.

He was succeeded as MP for Kabwe Central by the PF's Tutwa Ngulube.

He died in October 2021.
