= Dendy Young =

Rhodesian and Botswanan jurist

John Richard Dendy Young, QC, SC (4 September 1907 – 11 July 1998) was a Cape Colony-born lawyer, politician, and judge. Born in Cape Colony, Young joined the Public Service of Southern Rhodesia, before practising at the South Rhodesian Bar. He was a member of the legislatures of Southern Rhodesia and of the Federation of Rhodesia and Nyasaland from 1948 until 1956, when he was appointed to the High Court of Southern Rhodesia.

In 1968, he was one of the two justices of the High Court of Rhodesia to resign in protest against its rejection of the authority of the Judicial Committee of the Privy Council following Rhodesia's Unilateral Declaration of Independence. Young subsequently became Chief Justice of Botswana from 1968 to 1971, before entering private practice in South Africa.

== Early life and career ==
Born in Humansdorp District, Cape Colony, Young joined the Public Service of Southern Rhodesia in 1926. Having obtained a BA and a LLB as an external student at the University of South Africa, he resigned from the public service in 1934 and became a barrister, practising at Salisbury. He joined the armed forces in 1940, served in North Africa, Sicily and Italy, and received a commission in the field. Returning to the Rhodesian Bar in 1945, he became a King's Counsel in 1949.

In the 1934 Southern Rhodesian general election, Young unsuccessfully contested Salisbury North for the Reform Party. In the 1948 general election, he was elected for Avondale for the United Rhodesia Party. Young sat in the Southern Rhodesian Legislative Assembly until 1953, when he was elected to the Federal Assembly of the Federation of Rhodesia and Nyasaland for Sebakwe in that year's Federal election, becoming the Confederate Party's only MP and the unofficial leader of the opposition in the Assembly.

== High Court of Rhodesia and resignation ==
In 1956, Young stepped down from the Federal Assembly when he was appointed a judge of the General Division of the High Court of Southern Rhodesia. Along with his colleague John Fieldsend, Young resigned from the High Court of Rhodesia in 1968 in protest against the Court's rejection of the authority of the Privy Council after Rhodesia's Unilateral Declaration of Independence: at the time, he was the senior judge of the General Division. In a statement to a crowded courthouse in Bulawayo, Young said that:

The High Court has hitherto functioned as a court of the lawful sovereign under the 1961 Constitution. The rebel regime has actively acquiesced in this mode of functioning by acknowledging the validity of the High Court Orders and by carrying them into execution. The judgment of the Privy Council, which is the Supreme appellate tribunal of the High Court under the 1961 Constitution, becomes the judgment of the High Court. If, then, the authority of the Privy Council is not acknowledged in this country, that is equivalent to a rejection of the authority of the High Court and in my view the only course open to a judge of the High Court is to withdraw from the bench. It is a matter of conscience... There can be no suggestion that my resignation or that of any other judge must lead to a breakdown of law and order. On the contrary, for a judge appointed under the 1961 Constitution to enforce a law that subverts that Constitution is, in my judgment, to overthrow the law of the country. If order is to be maintained under some new system of law then it must be done by judges appointed by those responsible for the creation of the new system.

== Later career and death ==
Young was sworn in as the Chief Justice of Botswana in 1968, four days after his resignation from the Rhodesian bench, serving until 1971. He then practised as the Cape Province Bar, becoming a South African Senior Counsel in 1979. The same year, he was appointed a judge of the Courts of Appeal of Botswana, Lesotho and Swaziland.

Young lost his Rhodesian pension entitlements upon his resignation and was not given a pension by the British government, which forced him to practise at the Bar until he was 85. In his final years, his health was weakened by an assault on returning to his home from work. He died in Cape Town in 1998.

== Assessment ==
In 1978, Sydney Kentridge QC told New Zealand lawyers that:

Two judges in Rhodesia, and two alone, thought that their oaths meant exactly what they said and they, and they alone, thought that these high-sounding principles which I have referred to were not intended merely to be quoted at Bar dinners but actually to be acted on by judges. Let me mention their names: Mr Justice John Fieldsend and Mr Justice Dendy Young — names which, I think, should be honoured wherever English-speaking lawyers gather.

According to Jeremy Gauntlett SC, Chairperson of the Cape Bar:

Dendy Young paid a great personal price. Departing unmourned by one government and forgotten by another, he found himself obliged after interim service as Chief Justice of Botswana to make what was for him a third or fourth career at the Cape Bar in 1971... to use Alan Paton's phrase, Dendy Young had a commitment to the rule of law, a high ideal of the worth and dignity of people, and a repugnance to authoritarianism.

Southern Rhodesian Legislative Assembly
Preceded by Rubidge Stumbles	Member of Parliament for Avondale; 1948 – 1953	Succeeded by Rubidge Stumbles
Rhodesia and Nyasaland Federal Assembly
New constituency	Member of Federal Parliament for Sebakwe; 1953 – 1956	Succeeded by Robert Williamson
Legal offices
Preceded by	Chief Justice of Botswana; 1968 – 1971	Succeeded by Akinola Aguda
