= 1920 Northern Rhodesian Advisory Council election =

Advisory Council elections were held in Northern Rhodesia in April 1920.

== Electoral system ==
Northern Rhodesia was split into two constituencies, North-Western Rhodesia (four seats) and North-Eastern Rhodesia (one seat). Voting was restricted to British subjects over the age of 21 who had lived in the territory for at least six months and owned at least £150 of property.

== Results ==
| Seat | Elected members |
|---|---|
| North-Eastern Rhodesia | J.L. Bruce |
| North-Western Rhodesia | W.M. Alexander |
| North-Western Rhodesia | Frederick Clarke |
| North-Western Rhodesia | Leopold Moore |
| North-Western Rhodesia | D.E.C.R. Stirke |
Source: Northern Rhodesia Journal
