= Chinsali District =

Coordinates: 10°45′S 32°00′E

- District
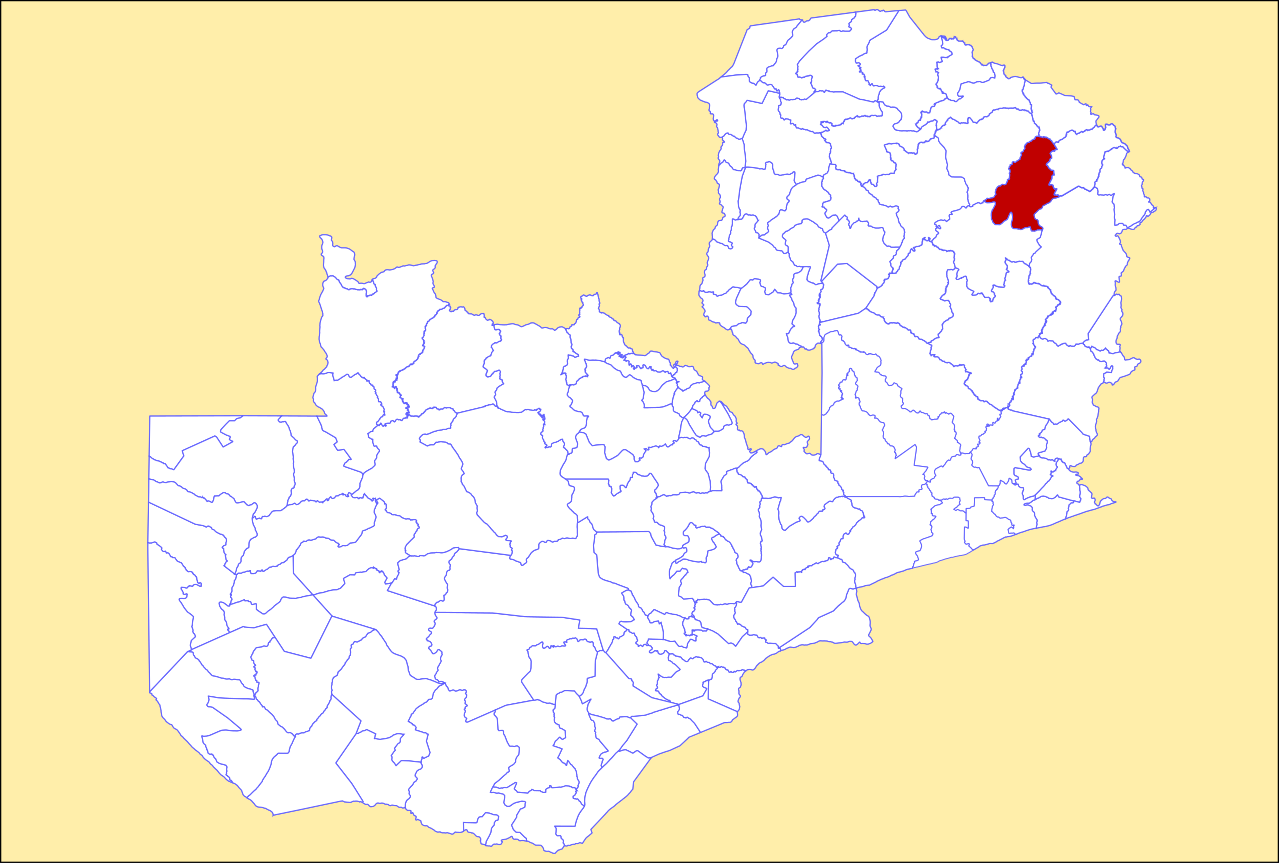
- District location in Zambia
- Country: Zambia
- Province: Muchinga Province
- Capital: Chinsali

Area
  - Total: 6,341.7 km^{2} (2,448.5 sq mi)

Population (2022)
  - Total: 148,997
  - Density: 23.495/km^{2} (60.851/sq mi)
- Time zone: UTC+2 (CAT)

Chinsali District is a district located in Muchinga Province, Zambia. The capital is Chinsali.

The district lies on the watershed between the Chambeshi River in the Congo Basin and the Luangwa River in the Zambezi basin. The north-eastern half of the district is relatively flat plateau, especially along the Chambeshi, of 1200–1300 m elevation but the south-western half has an attractive landscape of granite hills with an elevation of 1500–1600 m.

As of the 2022 Zambian Census, the district had a population of 148,997 people.
