= 1958 Federation of Rhodesia and Nyasaland election =

Federal elections were held in the Federation of Rhodesia and Nyasaland on 12 November 1958. The result was a victory for the ruling United Federal Party, with Roy Welensky remaining Prime Minister.

== Electoral system ==
The Federal Parliament had 59 seats, of which four were elected by an African electoral college in the northern territories, two were nominated by governors in the northern territories, with one seat reserved for an elected European representing African interests. The remaining 52 were directly-elected using two electoral rolls; a general roll mainly consisting of Europeans and a special roll with a more representative population mix. The general roll included 83,506 Europeans and Coloureds, 2,876 Asians and 1,055 Africans, whilst the special roll included 137 Europeans, 25 coloureds, 23 Asians and 692 Africans. Thousands of eligible Africans did not register to vote.

The general roll elected 44 seats, 24 in Southern Rhodesia, 14 in Northern Rhodesia and six in Nyasaland. Both the general and special roll voted for eight African seats, four from Southern Rhodesia and two each from Northern Rhodesia and Nyasaland.

The single European seat elected to represent African interests was elected in Southern Rhodesia by members of both rolls.

== Campaign ==
A total of 112 candidates contested 48 constituencies, with five seats in Nyasaland having only one candidate, all of whom were elected unopposed. The main contest was between the United Federal Party led by Welensky and the Dominion Party led by Winston Field. The UFP contested all 53 seats (including the five unopposed constituencies); the DP ran in 43 constituencies, the Constitution Party led by A. Scott ran in eight constituencies, and the Confederate Party led by S. Gurland contested a single seat in Salisbury. The remaining twelve candidates were independents.

== Results ==
Party	General roll			Special roll			African interests			Total seats	+/–
Party	Votes	%	Seats	Votes	%	Seats	Votes	%	Seats	Total seats	+/–
United Federal Party	37,145	58.99	36	35,445	64.16	7	25,359	56.04	1	44	+16
Dominion Party	22,202	35.26	7	18,177	32.90	1				8	New
Constitution Party	1,179	1.87	0	1,619	2.93	0				0	New
Confederate Party	55	0.09	0							0	–1
Independents	2,390	3.80	1				19,892	43.96	0	1	–1
African electoral college										4	0
Governor nominees										2	0
Total	62,971	100.00	44	55,241	100.00	8	45,251	100.00	1	59	+24
Valid votes	62,971	98.93		55,241	87.79		45,251	90.61			
Invalid/blank votes	684	1.07		7,683	12.21		4,691	9.39			
Total votes	63,655	100.00		62,924	100.00		49,942	100.00			
Registered voters/turnout	87,412	72.82		85,344	73.73		65,092	76.73			
Source: Sternberger et al.

=== By territory ===
==== Northern Rhodesia ====
Party	General roll			Special roll			Total seats
Party	Votes	%	Seats	Votes	%	Seats	Total seats
United Federal Party	7,638	58.26	12	7,801	66.13	2	14
Dominion Party	3,624	27.64	1	3,996	33.87	0	1
Constitution Party	645	4.92	0				0
Independents	1,203	9.18	1				1
Total	13,110	100.00	14	11,797	100.00	2	16
Valid votes	13,110	98.89		11,797	89.60		
Invalid/blank votes	147	1.11		1,369	10.40		
Total votes	13,257	100.00		13,166	100.00		
Registered voters/turnout	20,252	65.46		20,252	65.01		
Source: Sternberger et al.

==== Nyasaland ====
Party	General roll			Special roll			Total seats
Party	Votes	%	Seats	Votes	%	Seats	Total seats
United Federal Party	801	84.40	6			2	8
Dominion Party	96	10.12	0				0
Independents	52	5.48	0				0
Total	949	100.00	6			2	8
Valid votes	949	98.85					
Invalid/blank votes	11	1.15					
Total votes	960	100.00					
Registered voters/turnout	2,501	38.38					
Source: Sternberger et al.

==== Southern Rhodesia ====
Party	General roll			Special roll			African interests			Total seats
Party	Votes	%	Seats	Votes	%	Seats	Votes	%	Seats	Total seats
United Federal Party	28,706	58.69	18	27,644	63.63	3	25,359	56.04	1	22
Dominion Party	18,482	37.79	6	14,181	32.64	1				7
Constitution Party	534	1.09	0	1,619	3.73	0				0
Confederate Party	55	0.11	0							0
Independents	1,135	2.32	0				19,892	43.96	0	0
Total	48,912	100.00	24	43,444	100.00	4	45,251	100.00	1	29
Valid votes	48,912	98.94		43,444	87.31		45,251	90.61		
Invalid/blank votes	526	1.06		6,314	12.69		4,691	9.39		
Total votes	49,438	100.00		49,758	100.00		49,942	100.00		
Registered voters/turnout	64,659	76.46		65,092	76.44		65,092	76.73		
Source: Sternberger et al.
