= 1918 Northern Rhodesian Advisory Council election =

Advisory Council elections were held in Northern Rhodesia for the first time in July 1918.

== Background ==
Europeans in Northern Rhodesia had been calling for elected representation since the early 1910s. When Governor-General of South Africa Herbert Gladstone visited the territory in 1911 he met with farmers from Kafue who demanded that an Administrative Council be created. However, the British South Africa Company (BSAC) insisted that there were too few Europeans in the territory (1,184) to allow powers to be transferred.

In February 1913 the North-Western Rhodesia Farmers' Association was established, primarily to campaign for the creation of a Legislative Council. In December 1913 the BSAC announced that Europeans in the territory would be allowed to nominate two representatives that the Administrator would have to consult with.

After a political lull caused by World War I, Leopold Moore began calling for a Legislative Council again in 1917. However, the BSAC deferred a decision until the Southern Rhodesian Legislative Council had made a decision 1917 on amalgamating the territories. Although the vote in April was in favour, the elected members had a majority against and the BSAC opted not to proceed.

In July 1917 Resident Commissioner Herbert Stanley had started work on the establishment of an administrative council. Initial plans were for it to include the Administrator, five government officials and three elected members who would not have the right to vote. Eventually it was decided that there would be five elected members.

== Electoral system ==
Northern Rhodesia was split into two constituencies, North-Western Rhodesia (four seats) and North-Eastern Rhodesia (one seat). Voting was restricted to British subjects of European descent over the age of 21 who had lived in the territory for at least six months and owned at least £150 of property.

== Campaign ==
Only one candidate, J L Bruce, ran for the North-Eastern Rhodesia seat, and was returned unopposed.

== Results ==
Defeated candidates included Burkitt, Gray and Oosthuizen.

Seat	Elected members
North-Eastern Rhodesia	J L Bruce
North-Western Rhodesia	Lewis Gordon
North-Western Rhodesia	George Hornley
North-Western Rhodesia	Leopold Moore
North-Western Rhodesia	W W Shelmerdine
Source: Gelfand
