= Central Africa Party =

Multi-racial political party in Federation of Rhodesia and Nyasaland

The Central Africa Party was a multi-racial political party in the Federation of Rhodesia and Nyasaland (also called the Central Africa Federation). The party organised separately in the three constituent part of the federation, Northern Rhodesia, Nyasaland and Southern Rhodesia.

== History ==
The CAP was established by Garfield Todd in 1959. Led by John Moffat in Northern Rhodesia where it had taken on the liberal mantle from the Constitution Party, the party nominated six candidates for the 1959 general elections, winning three seats; Moffat in Eastern Rural, Harry Franklin in Western Rural and Alfred Gondwe in Eastern, while William Nkanza was elected as an independent CAP member in North-Western.

In 1960 the party split into separate parties in the three territories it operated in. In Northern Rhodesia it was renamed the Northern Rhodesian Liberal Party after being joined by other liberal groups; Moffat was elected party president. In 1961 Moffat, Franklin and Gondwe all became ministers after the United Federal Party government resigned. However, in the October 1962 general elections the Liberal Party failed to win a seat, and subsequently announced its disbandment in November, advising members to join or support the United National Independence Party.

In Southern Rhodesia it continued under the Central Africa Party name. It put forward 14 candidates for the December 1962 general elections, but also failed to win a seat.
