= Shy Kumwenda =

Zambian footballer (born 1978)

Personal information
- Date of birth: 24 October 1978 (age 48)
- Position: Forward

Senior career*
Years	Team	Apps	(Gls)
1998–2002	Zamsure F.C.		
2003	ZESCO United F.C.		
2004	Zamsure F.C.		
2005	Nakambala Leopards F.C.		

International career
1997–2000	Zambia	5	(1)
- * Club domestic league appearances and goals

Shy Kumwenda (born 24 October 1978) is a Zambian retired football striker.
