= Chrizoster Halwindi =

Zambian politician (born 1969)

Chrizoster Phiri Halwindi (born 22 January 1969) is a Zambian politician from the United Party for National Development. She was elected to the National Assembly from Kabwe Central in the 2021 Zambian general election.
