= Kabwe Central =

Zambian National Assembly constituency

Kabwe Central is a constituency of the National Assembly of Zambia. It covers the eastern part of Kabwe in Kabwe District of Central Province, including the town centre.

== History ==
The constituency was established in 1926 as Northern, covering Broken Hill, Kasempa, Mkushi, Mwinilunga, Ndola and Solwezi. In 1929 Abercorn, Chinsali, Isoka, Kasama, Luwingu, Mpika and Mporokoso were added to the constituency, whilst Kasempa, Ndola and Solwezi were transferred to the new Ndola constituency.

In 1941 the constituency was renamed Broken Hill, covering only Broken Hill, Mkushi and Serenje, with the remaining settlements transferred to the new North-Eastern constituency. It was reduced in size again in 1948, now covering only the urban area of Broken Hill and the northern part of the Broken Hill rural area.

The constituency was renamed Kabwe in 1964, and became Kabwe Central in 2001.

== List of MPs ==
Election year	MP	Party
Northern
1926	Louis Gordon	
1928 (by-election)	Chad Norris	
1929	Chad Norris	
1932	Chad Norris	
1935	Stewart Gore-Browne	
1938	Roy Welensky	
Broken Hill
1941	Roy Welensky	Labour Party
1944	Roy Welensky	
1948	Roy Welensky	
1954	John Roberts	Federal Party
1959	John Roberts	United Federal Party
1962	John Roberts	United Federal Party
Kabwe
1964	Nalumino Mundia	United National Independence Party
1968	Josy Monga	United National Independence Party
1973	Miziyabo Mkandawire	United National Independence Party
1978	Alice Lloyd	United National Independence Party
1983	Wilfred Wonani	United National Independence Party
1988	Wilfred Wonani	United National Independence Party
1991	Paul Tembo	Movement for Multi-Party Democracy
1996	Austin Chewe	Independent
Kabwe Central
2001	Patrick Musonda	Heritage Party
2002 (by-election)	Patrick Musonda	Movement for Multi-Party Democracy
2006	Kayula Kakusa	Movement for Multi-Party Democracy
2011	James Kapyanga	Patriotic Front
2016	Tutwa Ngulube	Patriotic Front
2021	Chrizoster Halwindi	United Party for National Development
2026	Chrizoster Halwindi	United Party for National Development
