= Dominion Party =

Political party in Rhodesia

The Dominion Party was a political party in the Federation of Rhodesia and Nyasaland, led by Winston Field.

== History ==
The party was established in 1956 by a merger of several political groups and the remains of the Confederate Party, which had disintegrated after its defeat in the federal elections in 1953. However, by 1958 it had gained two more seats through by-elections.

Although the party received the most votes in the June 1958 general elections in Southern Rhodesia, it was defeated by the United Federal Party, which won four more seats. It was also defeated by the UFP in the November 1958 federal elections, winning just eight of the 59 seats. In the 1959 general elections in Northern Rhodesia the party ran on a campaign of splitting the Federation into European and African areas. It nominated nine candidates and won one seat.

In 1960 the party split; the Northern Rhodesian and Nyasaland branches formed the Federal Dominion Party. The Southern Rhodesian branch was reconstituted in 1962 to form the Rhodesian Front. Both factions boycotted the 1962 federal elections, which the UFP was the only party to contest.
