= 1958 Southern Rhodesian general election =

General elections were held in Southern Rhodesia on 5 June 1958 for the seats in the Southern Rhodesian Legislative Assembly. Although the Dominion Party received the most votes, the result was a victory for the ruling United Federal Party, which won 17 seats. The revived United Rhodesia Party under the leadership of former Prime Minister Sir Garfield Todd failed to win a single seat.

== Electoral system ==
The thirty members of the Legislative Assembly were elected from single-member constituencies by alternative vote, with voters able to list candidates in order of preference. This replaced the first-past-the-post system used in previous elections.

The elections were held using a restrictive franchise, which was divided into 'ordinary' voters and 'special' voters, although both voted for the same set of candidates. Ordinary voters were required to have a minimum income of £720 per annum or be literate and own £1,500 of property, or have a minimum income of £480, own £1,000 of property and have completed primary education, or have a minimum income of £300 (or own £500 of property) and have completed four years of secondary education.

The special voter category was a new concept introduced for the 1958 elections, with a lower requirement of having an income of at least £240 a year and being literate, or having had an income of £120 a year for two years and having completed two years of secondary education. However, the number special voters was capped at one-sixth of the electoral roll in each constituency. If the number of special voters exceeded one-sixth of the electorate, the number of votes cast by special voters was devalued by an amount that would result in their votes equalling one-sixth of those cast.

The restrictions meant that out of a population of around 2.3 million, only 3,000 Africans qualified to vote (1,500 as ordinary voters and 1,500 as special voters). Many of the 178,000 Europeans in the territory were unable to vote as they were not British citizens, but 74,000 qualified as ordinary voters and 1,500 as special voters. From a population of 13,000 Asian and mixed-race residents, 1,500 qualified as ordinary voters and 8,000 as special voters. Overall, 88,000 people were qualified to vote from a population of around 2.5 million.

== Results ==
Had the alternative vote system not been introduced, the Dominion Party would have won the elections with 17 of the 30 seats. However, when preferences were taken into account, it won only 13.

Party	First preferences		Final count		Seats	+/–
Party	Votes	%	Votes	%	Seats	+/–
Dominion Party	18,142	45.70	18,314	47.23	13	New
United Federal Party	16,840	42.42	17,416	44.91	17	−9
United Rhodesia Party	4,652	11.72	2,981	7.69	0	New
Independents	67	0.17	67	0.17	0	–2
Total	39,701	100.00	38,778	100.00	30	0
Valid votes	39,701	98.47				
Invalid/blank votes	616	1.53				
Total votes	40,317	100.00				
Registered voters/turnout	55,082	73.19				
Source: Willson
