= 1922 Northern Rhodesian Advisory Council election =

Advisory Council elections were held in Northern Rhodesia in February 1922. Candidates opposed to amalgamation with Southern Rhodesia received 1,117 votes, whilst candidates supportive of the proposal received 310.

== Electoral system ==
Northern Rhodesia was split into two constituencies, North-Western Rhodesia (four seats) and North-Eastern Rhodesia (one seat). Voting was restricted to British subjects over the age of 21 who had lived in the territory for at least six months and owned at least £150 of property. A total of 679 voters registered in North-Western Rhodesia.

== Results ==
In North-Western Rhodesia a total of 569 votes were cast, of which four were invalid.

| Constituency | Candidate | Votes | % | Notes |
|---|---|---|---|---|
| North-Eastern Rhodesia | C Timmler | 38 | 58.5 | Elected |
| North-Eastern Rhodesia | J N Phipps | 27 | 41.5 | Defeated |
| North-Western Rhodesia | Leopold Moore | 329 | 19.1 | Re-elected |
| North-Western Rhodesia | William Doull | 295 | 17.1 | Elected |
| North-Western Rhodesia | Philip Ellis | 276 | 16.0 | Elected |
| North-Western Rhodesia | Frederick Clarke | 238 | 13.8 | Re-elected |
| North-Western Rhodesia | D E C R Stirke | 189 | 10.9 | Defeated |
| North-Western Rhodesia | Randolf Baker | 157 | 9.1 | |
| North-Western Rhodesia | P F Godson | 100 | 5.8 | |
| North-Western Rhodesia | J L Moore | 90 | 5.2 | |
| North-Western Rhodesia | J F M Oosthuizen | 53 | 3.1 | |
Source: The Livingstone Mail
