= 1959 Northern Rhodesian general election =

General elections were held in Northern Rhodesia on 20 March 1959, although voting did not take place in two constituencies until 9 April. The United Federal Party (UFP) was expected to win the elections, and did so by taking 13 of the 22 elected seats on the Legislative Council.

== Electoral system ==
The elections were the first held under the Lennox-Boyd constitution. It provided for a 30-member Legislative Council with 22 elected members, six official members and two appointed members. The 22 elected seats were divided into 12 "ordinary" seats with mostly European voters, six "special" seats mainly reserved for African voters, two reserved for African candidates and two reserved for European candidates. "Ordinary" voters had to have at least four years of secondary education and either an income of at least £300 a year or own property worth £500. They could also qualify by having primary education and earning at least £480 a year or owning £1,000 of property, or for those not meeting the educational requirements, have an annual income of at least £720 or own over £1,500 of property. Certain people were automatically entitled to register as "ordinary voters", including ministers of religion, chiefs recognised by the Governor and wives of anyone qualified as an "ordinary" voter (although in the case of polygamous marriages, only the senior wife qualified). "Special" voters had to have at least two years of secondary education and an income of at least £120 a year, or have an income of at least £150 or own property worth £500 or more. Automatic qualification as a "special" voter was given to pensioners receiving a monthly or annual pension for at least 20 years' service for one employer, headmen or hereditary councillors with at least two years of unpaid service and who were recognised by their chief, or be the wife (or senior wife) of any qualified "special" voter. All voters had to be over 21, able to complete their registration form in English and have lived in the Federation of Rhodesia and Nyasaland for at two years and in their constituency for three months.

The African reserved seats were created by combining several ordinary seats, whilst the European reserved seats were based on combinations of the special seats. Every voter had two votes, one for their special or ordinary constituency member, and one for their reserved member. In the ordinary and European reserved seats, special votes were not allowed to account for more than a third of the total.

A total of 30,234 people were registered to vote, up from 15,505 for the 1954 elections. Of the 23,388 "ordinary" voters, 20,546 were Europeans, 2,046 Indians and 796 Africans. The 6,846 special voters included 6,821 Africans, 20 Europeans and five Indians.

Constituencies
Ordinary	Reserved African	Ordinary voters	Special voters
Broken Hill	South Central	2,208	394
Livingstone	South Central	1,200	140
Lusaka Central	South Central	1,428	102
Lusaka East	South Central	1,503	289
Lusaka West	South Central	2,483	163
Southern	South Central	1,243	381
Chingola	Copperbelt	1,317	325
Kitwe East	Copperbelt	1,485	195
Kitwe West	Copperbelt	1,672	366
Luanshya	Copperbelt	2,296	275
Mufulira	Copperbelt	1,729	403
Ndola	Copperbelt	2,943	267
Special	Reserved European	Ordinary voters	Special voters
Barotseland	Western Rural	239	488
North Western	Western Rural	187	637
South Western	Western Rural	197	620
Eastern	Eastern Rural	686	790
Luapula	Eastern Rural	306	473
Northern	Eastern Rural	266	538
Total		23,388	6,846
Source: East Africa and Rhodesia

== Campaign ==
A total of 54 candidates contested the elections, of which 20 were African. Four parties ran in the election, with the UFP led by John Roberts putting forward 18 candidates, the Dominion Party 10, the Central Africa Party led by John Moffat seven and the Northern Rhodesian African National Congress led by Harry Nkumbula one (Nkumbula himself). Seventeen candidates ran as independents, with one running as a Central Africa Party independent. The Zambian African National Congress, a breakaway from the NRANC, called for a boycott. The UFP were unopposed in two seats. No candidates were nominated for the Northern and Luapula Special constituencies, requiring nominations to be reopened until 19 March.

The UFP held a centrist position, supporting dominion status for the Federation of Rhodesia and Nyasaland and opposing the British Colonial Office (reflecting the views of most white Northern Rhodesians). The Dominion Party put forward a right-wing platform including supporting a partition of the Federation into European and African areas. The Central Africa Party ran on a liberal platform.

== Results ==
Party	Votes	%	Seats	+/–
United Federal Party	17,376	51.69	13	+3
Dominion Party	4,055	12.06	1	New
Central Africa Party	3,402	10.12	3	New
Northern Rhodesian African National Congress	572	1.70	1	New
Independent Central Africa Party	247	0.73	1	New
Independents	7,964	23.69	1	–1
Vacant			2	–
Total	33,616	100.00	22	+10
Source: Northern Rhodesia Election Office

=== By voter roll ===
Party	Ordinary seats			Special seats			African seats			European seats			Total seats
Party	Votes	%	Seats	Votes	%	Seats	Votes	%	Seats	Votes	%	Seats	Total seats
United Federal Party	8,540	59.37	11	421	14.30	0	7,855	53.58	2	560	34.40	0	13
Dominion Party	3,329	23.14	1	−	−	−	726	4.95	0	−	−	−	1
Central Africa Party	976	6.78	0	571	19.40	1	787	5.37	0	1,068	65.60	2	3
Northern Rhodesian African National Congress	−	−	−	572	19.43	1	–	–	–	–	–	–	1
Independent Central Africa Party	–	–	–	247	8.39	1	–	–	–	–	–	–	–
Independents	1,540	10.71	0	1,133	38.49	1	5,291	36.09	0	–	–	–	2
Vacant	–	–	–	–	–	2	–	–	–	–	–	–	2
Invalid/blank votes	268	–	–		–	–	752	–	–		–	–	–
Total	14,653	100	12	2,944	100	6	15,411	100	2	1,628	100	2	22
Registered voters/turnout	21,825	67.14	–	3,844		–			–			–	–
Source: Northern Rhodesia Election Office

=== By constituency ===
Constituency		Candidate	Party	Votes	%
Ordinary	Broken Hill	John Roberts	United Federal Party	1,275	74.43
Ordinary	Broken Hill	Gladys Douglas	Independent	438	25.57
Ordinary	Chingola	William Gray Dunlop	United Federal Party	Unopposed	
Ordinary	Kitwe East	Hugh Stanley	United Federal Party	831	77.95
Ordinary	Kitwe East	Francis Smith	Dominion Party	235	22.05
Ordinary	Kitwe West	Jerry Steyn	United Federal Party	890	57.09
Ordinary	Kitwe West	Cecil Earl	Dominion Party	669	42.91
Ordinary	Livingstone	Maurice Rabb	United Federal Party	Unopposed	
Ordinary	Luanshya	Rodney Malcomson	United Federal Party	1,208	74.38
Ordinary	Luanshya	Robert Greer	Dominion Party	416	25.62
Ordinary	Lusaka Central	Ernest Sergeant	United Federal Party	607	62.64
Ordinary	Lusaka Central	Donald Clarke	Independent	188	19.40
Ordinary	Lusaka Central	Frederick Gray	Independent	121	12.49
Ordinary	Lusaka Central	Cyril Thatcher	Dominion Party	53	5.47
Ordinary	Lusaka East	Ebden Carlisle	United Federal Party	562	46.18
Ordinary	Lusaka East	Alexander Scott	Independent	405	33.28
Ordinary	Lusaka East	Charles Fleming	Dominion Party	235	19.31
Ordinary	Lusaka East	Irene Buchanan	Independent	15	1.23
Ordinary	Lusaka West	Eric Grindley-Ferris	United Federal Party	735	42.58
Ordinary	Lusaka West	Ralph Seal	Central Africa Party	336	19.47
Ordinary	Lusaka West	Frank Derby	Dominion Party	282	16.34
Ordinary	Lusaka West	Douglas Edmonds	Independent	271	16.34
Ordinary	Lusaka West	Margaretha Seibritz	Independent	102	5.91
Ordinary	Mufulira	Pieter Wulff	United Federal Party	734	52.32
Ordinary	Mufulira	Bertram Redmond	Dominion Party	669	47.68
Ordinary	Ndola	Cecil Dennistoun Burney	United Federal Party	1,094	57.73
Ordinary	Ndola	Norman Hunt	Central Africa Party	640	33.77
Ordinary	Ndola	William van Zyl	Dominion Party	161	8.50
Ordinary	Southern	Gert Smith	Dominion Party	609	50.21
Ordinary	Southern	Geoffrey Beckett	United Federal Party	604	49.79
Special	Barotseland	Kwalombota Mulonda	Independent	382	66.90
Special	Barotseland	Mufaya Mubuna	United Federal Party	168	29.42
Special	Barotseland	Yuyi Nganga	Independent	21	3.68
Special	Eastern	Alfred Gondwe	Central Africa Party	398	36.28
Special	Eastern	Chiwala Banda	Independent	292	26.62
Special	Eastern	Isaac Nkholoma	United Federal Party	253	23.06
Special	Eastern	Shadrick Cheme	Independent	154	14.04
Special	Luapula	No candidate nominated			
Special	North-Western	William Nkanza	Independent Central Africa Party	247	39.02
Special	North-Western	Samuel Mbilishi	Independent	213	23.65
Special	North-Western	Beston Muluku	Central Africa Party	173	27.33
Special	Northern	No candidate nominated			
Special	South-Western	Harry Nkumbula	Northern Rhodesian African National Congress	572	88.96
Special	South-Western	Robinson Nabulyato	Independent	71	11.04
African; Reserved	Copperbelt	Gabriel Musumbulwa	United Federal Party	4,451	58.26
African; Reserved	Copperbelt	Lawrence Katilungu	Independent	2,674	35.00
African; Reserved	Copperbelt	Robinson Puta	Independent	313	4.10
African; Reserved	Copperbelt	Pascale Sokata	Independent	202	2.64
African; Reserved	South Central	William Kazokah	United Federal Party	3,404	48.50
African; Reserved	South Central	Safeli Chileshe	Independent	2,102	29.95
African; Reserved	South Central	Gwale Habanyama	Central Africa Party	787	11.21
African; Reserved	South Central	Noah Chyapeni	Dominion Party	726	10.34
European; Reserved	Eastern Rural	John Moffat	Central Africa Party	662	60.90
European; Reserved	Eastern Rural	Reuben Kidson	United Federal Party	425	39.10
European; Reserved	Western Rural	Harry Franklin	Central Africa Party	406	75.05
European; Reserved	Western Rural	Hugh Mitcheley	United Federal Party	135	24.95
Source: Northern Rhodesia Election Office

=== By-elections ===
By-elections were held in the Luapula and Northern Special constituencies on 9 April.

Constituency	Candidate	Party	Votes	%
Luapula	Samson Mununga	Independent	234	51.88
Luapula	M M Simfukwe		113	25.06
Luapula	John Mutale		57	12.64
Luapula	G E Tafuna		47	10.42
Northern	Lakement Ngandu	Independent	228	42.22
Northern	M G M Chali		223	41.30
Northern	Mateyo Kakumbi		89	16.48
Source: East Africa and Rhodesia

== Aftermath ==
Following the election, Governor Arthur Benson appointed six ministers; John Roberts as Minister of Labour and Mines, Ebden Carlisle as Minister of Lands and Natural Resources, William Gray Dunlop as Minister of Transport and Works, Rodney Malcomson as Minister of Local Government, Gabriel Musumbulwa as Minister of African Education and Edson Mwamba as Minister of African Agriculture.

== See also ==
- List of members of the Legislative Council of Northern Rhodesia (1959–62)
