= 1954 Northern Rhodesian general election =

General elections were held in Northern Rhodesia on 19 February 1954. The result was a victory for the Federal Party, which won 10 of the 12 elected European seats in the Legislative Council.

== Campaign ==
Although Geoffrey Beckett, leader of the elected members in the Legislative Council, had called for the elections to be fought on a non-party basis, the Federal Party voted to contest the elections at a congress held on 6 January. Beckett was prevented from contesting the elections after his nomination papers were rejected by the returning officer after he failed to return his declaration form in time. In Livingstone the local Federal Party selected Llewellyn Oxenham as its candidate, but the party headquarters refused to ratify his nomination, instead nominating Harry Thom, who it was widely thought would stand down if he was elected to allow Beckett to be stand in a by-election. The Ndola branch's selection of its candidate being overruled by the party executive after it was claimed new members had been enrolled and votes had been solicited in the bar of the local railway club where the vote took place.

The Confederate Party opted not to contest the elections, although some members were running as independents.

== Results ==
In mining towns Federal Party candidates defeated independents backed by the European Mineworkers Union and the European Salaried Staff Association. The only two seats in which they were defeated were the Midlands constituency near Lusaka (won by John Gaunt) and Livingstone, where Frank Derby won by 11 votes after the Federal Party vote was split between Oxenham and Thom. Both Derby and Gaunt were members of the Confederate Party. Voter turnout was between 70 and 80% in the mining areas, but lower in other constituencies, and around 60% overall.

Party	Votes	%	Seats
Federal Party	4,549	54.27	10
Independents	3,833	45.73	2
Total	8,382	100.00	12
Valid votes	8,382	99.36	
Invalid/blank votes	54	0.64	
Total votes	8,436	100.00	
Registered voters/turnout	14,635	57.64	
Source: Northern Rhodesia Election Office

=== By constituency ===
Constituency	Candidate	Party	Votes	%	Notes
Broken Hill	John Roberts	Federal Party	619	82.8	Elected
Broken Hill	William Kirkwood	Independent	129	17.2	
Chingola	William Gray Dunlop	Federal Party	325	56.9	Elected
Chingola	G D Crane	Independent	246	43.1	
Fort Jameson	Reuben Kidson	Federal Party	175	54.0	Elected
Fort Jameson	W B McGee	Independent	149	46.0	
Livingstone	Frank Derby	Independent	248	34.8	Elected
Livingstone	Harry Thom	Federal Party	237	33.3	
Livingstone	Llewellyn Oxenham	Independent (Note: Oxenham was an unofficial Federal Party candidate)	227	31.9	
Luanshya	Rodney Malcomson	Federal Party	463	44.7	Elected
Luanshya	J F Purvis	Independent	430	41.5	
Luanshya	A E Heller	Independent	143	13.8	
Lusaka	Ernest Sergeant	Federal Party	615	48.1	Elected
Lusaka	Nan Staples	Independent	531	41.5	
Lusaka	Richard Sampson	Independent	132	10.3	
Midland	John Gaunt	Independent	227	56.6	Elected
Midland	Brian Goodwin	Federal Party	174	43.4	
Mufulira	Lewin Tucker	Federal Party	483	48.1	Elected
Mufulira	Alexander Stevens	Independent	416	41.4	
Mufulira	A E Beech	Independent	106	10.5	
Ndola	Bill Rendall	Federal Party	690	70.4	Elected
Ndola	Margaret Smith	Independent	290	29.6	
Nkana	James Botha	Federal Party	768	57.9	Elected
Nkana	A B Hunter	Independent	559	42.1	
Northern	Harold Watmore	Federal Party	Unopposed		Elected
South-Western	William Harris Wroth	Federal Party	Unopposed		Elected
Source: Northern Rhodesia Election Office

== Aftermath ==
On 13 January four African members (Robinson Nabulyato from Southern Province, Safeli Chileshe from Central Province, Paskale Sokota from Western Province and Lakement Ngaundu from Northern Province) had been nominated for membership of the Assembly by the Northern Rhodesian African Representative Council from a field of 14 candidates.

== See also ==
- List of members of the Legislative Council of Northern Rhodesia (1954–58)
