= 1953 Federation of Rhodesia and Nyasaland election =

Federal elections were held in the Federation of Rhodesia and Nyasaland on 15 December 1953. They were the first elections to the Legislative Assembly of the federation, which had been formed a few months before. The elections saw a landslide victory for the Federal Party under Godfrey Huggins, who had been Prime Minister of Southern Rhodesia for the past 20 years.

== Composition of the Federal Assembly ==
Voters elected 35 members of a unicameral Federal Assembly: 14 from Southern Rhodesia constituencies, 8 from Northern Rhodesia constituencies, and four from Nyasaland. In addition, there were three members from each territory representing African interests: one of these was a European and two were African. In Southern Rhodesia only, these positions were elected; in the other territories, the Governor appointed the European member, while an electoral college chose the African members.

== Electoral qualifications ==
When the Federal constitution was agreed at the London conference of 1953, the qualification for electors in Northern and Southern Rhodesia was taken as the same as those in operation for territorial elections in those territories. Nyasaland did not have direct elections at this point and so was excluded until the Legislative Council there enacted proper provisions.

At the election day, the electorate was comprised as follows:

Territory	European electors	Asian electors	Coloured electors	African electors	Total
Southern Rhodesia	48,869	594	570	441	50,474
Northern Rhodesia	14,588	856		3	15,447
Nyasaland	983	75	–	–	1,058
Total	64,440	2,095		444	66,979

== Election campaign ==
The advent of the Federation caused a profound shift in the structure of politics in the Rhodesias. Godfrey Huggins formed the Federal Party to fight the election, merging his own United Party with the opposition Rhodesia Party and incorporating supporters in Northern Rhodesia and Nyasaland. Several members of other opposition parties in Southern Rhodesia who supported federation also decided to join the Federal Party. Among them were William Eastwood, from the Rhodesia Labour Party, whose departure was prompted by the initial decision of his Party to fight the elections: Eastwood felt that this would divide supporters of federation. Another opposition member going over to the Federal Party was Ian Smith, who had been elected as a Liberal candidate in the 1948 general election.

Opponents of federation formed the Confederate Party, which advocated a system in the Rhodesias akin to apartheid in South Africa. This issue was also raised by Huggins who campaigned vigorously against it. Huggins believed the policy was unpopular and impractical. A group called the Progressive Party was formed to offer voters a party of the centre-left, but swiftly dissolved when it found organising a difficulty and realised it would not be able to nominate more than about two candidates. There were a few independent candidates, most notably two in Northern Rhodesia. Dr Alexander Scott in Lusaka and Norman Lacey in the copperbelt constituency of Nkana-Chingola both advocated a liberal racial policy similar to that which the Progressive Party had been intending to offer.

One unusual court case arose after nominations. Gaston Thornicroft, a mixed-race man who was described as "living like a European", was refused nomination for the Southern Rhodesia constituency for Europeans to represent African interests on the grounds that he was not a European. He challenged the decision in court but was unsuccessful.

== Results ==
Party	Ordinary members			African members			Special European member			Total seats
Party	Votes	%	Seats	Votes	%	Seats	Votes	%	Seats	Total seats
Federal Party	35,992	67.78	24	20,005	72.68	2				26
Confederate Party	15,263	28.74	1				10,183	27.85	0	1
Independents	1,848	3.48	1	7,520	27.32	0	26,376	72.15	1	2
African electoral college										4
Governor nominees										2
Total	53,103	100.00	26	27,525	100.00	2	36,559	100.00	1	35
Valid votes				27,525	75.11		36,559	94.94		
Invalid/blank votes				9,123	24.89		1,947	5.06		
Total votes				36,648	100.00		38,506	100.00		
Registered voters/turnout				50,474	72.61		50,474	76.29		
Source: Sternberger et al.

=== By territory ===
==== Northern Rhodesia ====
Party	Votes	%	Seats
Federal Party	7,053	72.09	7
Confederate Party	1,858	18.99	0
Independents	873	8.92	1
African electoral colleges			2
Governor nominees			1
Total	9,784	100.00	11
Valid votes	9,784	99.89	
Invalid/blank votes	11	0.11	
Total votes	9,795	100.00	
Registered voters/turnout	15,507	63.17	
Source: Sternberger et al.

===== Ordinary members =====
Constituency Electorate and turnout	Candidate	Party	Votes	%
Broken Hill; 1,552 (60.3%)	Roland Welensky	Federal Party	817	87.3
Broken Hill; 1,552 (60.3%)	William Kirkwood	Confederate Party	119	12.7
Kafue; 1,015 (62.9%)	Guillaume François Marais Van Eeden	Federal Party	441	69.1
Kafue; 1,015 (62.9%)	John Gaunt	Confederate Party	197	30.9
Livingstone; 1,377 (66.7%)	John Cranmer Graylin	Federal Party	671	73.0
Livingstone; 1,377 (66.7%)	Frank Derby	Confederate Party	248	27.0
Luanshya-Mufulira; 3,066 (60.0%)	Vincent Thomas Joyce	Federal Party	1,326	72.1
Luanshya-Mufulira; 3,066 (60.0%)	Douglas Edgar Charsley	Confederate Party	513	27.9
Luangwa; 889 (61.9%)	Frank Bruce Robertson	Federal Party	446	81.1
Luangwa; 889 (61.9%)	Charles Benjamin Dodkins	Confederate Party	104	18.9
Lusaka; 2,172 (67.4%)	Dr Alexander Scott	Independent	758	51.8
Lusaka; 2,172 (67.4%)	Ernest Walter Sargeant	Federal Party	626	42.8
Lusaka; 2,172 (67.4%)	Raymond Beresford Pakenham	Confederate Party	79	5.4
Ndola; 1,946 (57.2%)	Frank Stephen Owen	Federal Party	907	81.5
Ndola; 1,946 (57.2%)	Willem Hugo Van Zyl	Confederate Party	206	18.5
Nkana-Chingola; 3,490 (66.6%)	George Wellington Rex L'Ange	Federal Party	1,819	78.2
Nkana-Chingola; 3,490 (66.6%)	Edward Brockman Hovelmeier	Confederate Party	392	16.9
Nkana-Chingola; 3,490 (66.6%)	Norman Henry Lacey	Independent	115	4.9

===== Specially elected African members =====
Territory	Member	Party
Northern Rhodesia	Mateyo Kakumbi	Independent
Northern Rhodesia	Dauti Lawton Yamba	Independent

===== Specially appointed European member =====
Territory	Member	Party
NORTHERN RHODESIA	Dr. John Fearby Campbell Haslam (resigned, 20 December 1954)	Independent
NORTHERN RHODESIA	Sir John Smith Moffat (appointed 22 December 1954)	Independent

==== Nyasaland ====
Party	Votes	%	Seats
Federal Party	3,412	93.97	4
Confederate Party	29	0.80	0
Independents	190	5.23	0
African electoral college			2
Governor nominees			1
Total	3,631	100.00	7
Source: Sternberger et al.

===== Ordinary members =====
Constituency Electorate and turnout	Candidate	Party	Votes	%
NYASALAND; Four members 1,058 (85.8%)	Rupert Cecil Bucquet	Federal Party	903	87.3
NYASALAND; Four members 1,058 (85.8%)	John Foot	Federal Party	879	87.3
NYASALAND; Four members 1,058 (85.8%)	Paul Frederick Brereton	Federal Party	822	87.3
NYASALAND; Four members 1,058 (85.8%)	Malcolm Palliser Barrow	Federal Party	808	87.3
NYASALAND; Four members 1,058 (85.8%)	Pranlal Dayaram Lalsodagarwala	Independent	105	9.7
NYASALAND; Four members 1,058 (85.8%)	Alibhai Adambhai Desai	Independent	85	9.7
NYASALAND; Four members 1,058 (85.8%)	Charles Walsh	Confederate Party	29	3.0

===== Specially elected African members =====
Territory	Member	Party
NYASALAND	Wellington Manoah Chirwa	Independent
NYASALAND	Clement Robin Kumbikano	Independent

===== Specially appointed European member =====
Territory	Member	Party
NYASALAND	Andrew Beveridge Doig (resigned, 24 June 1958)	Independent

==== Southern Rhodesia ====
Party	Ordinary members			African members			Special European member			Total seats
Party	Votes	%	Seats	Votes	%	Seats	Votes	%	Seats	Total seats
Federal Party	25,527	64.32	13	20,005	72.68	2				26
Confederate Party	13,376	33.70	1				10,183	27.85	0	1
Independents	785	1.98	0	7,520	27.32	0	26,376	72.15	1	1
Total	39,688	100.00	14	27,525	100.00	2	36,559	100.00	1	28
Valid votes	39,688	99.38		27,525	75.11		36,559	94.94		
Invalid/blank votes	246	0.62		9,123	24.89		1,947	5.06		
Total votes	39,934	100.00		36,648	100.00		38,506	100.00		
Registered voters/turnout	50,474	79.12		50,474	72.61		50,474	76.29		
Source: Sternberger et al.

===== Ordinary members =====
Constituency Electorate and turnout	Candidate	Party	Votes	%
BORDER; 3,618 (83.2%)	Benjamin Disraeli Goldberg	Federal Party	1,886	62.7
BORDER; 3,618 (83.2%)	Andrew Skeen	Confederate Party	1,123	37.3
BULAWAYO; 3,401 (75.9%)	Donald MacIntyre	Federal Party	1,789	69.3
BULAWAYO; 3,401 (75.9%)	Arthur Lear Smith	Confederate Party	793	30.7
BULAWAYO SUBURBS; 3,575 (77.3%)	William Hives Eastwood	Federal Party	1,961	71.0
BULAWAYO SUBURBS; 3,575 (77.3%)	William Shaw	Confederate Party	801	29.0
DARWIN; 3,547 (79.4%)	John Moore Caldicott	Federal Party	1,946	69.1
DARWIN; 3,547 (79.4%)	Richard Hunter Christie	Confederate Party	872	30.9
MIDLANDS; 3,584 (71.5%)	Ian Douglas Smith	Federal Party	1,148	44.8
MIDLANDS; 3,584 (71.5%)	Robert Williamson	Independent	785	30.6
MIDLANDS; 3,584 (71.5%)	William Henry Weedon	Confederate Party	629	24.6
MREWA; 3,664 (80.3%)	Neville Gwynne Barrett	Federal Party	1,816	61.7
MREWA; 3,664 (80.3%)	George Richard Musgrave	Confederate Party	1,126	38.3
SALISBURY; 3,995 (72.8%)	Leslie Manfred Noel Hodson	Federal Party	2,023	69.5
SALISBURY; 3,995 (72.8%)	John Liston Dalrymple	Confederate Party	886	30.5
SALISBURY SOUTH; 3,665 (75.2%)	William Alexander Eustace Winterton	Federal Party	1,496	54.3
SALISBURY SOUTH; 3,665 (75.2%)	Hendrik Andries Alberts	Confederate Party	1,261	45.7
SALISBURY SUBURBS; 3,649 (77.2%)	Godfrey Martin Huggins	Federal Party	2,055	73.0
SALISBURY SUBURBS; 3,649 (77.2%)	Estcourt Vernon Herbert Cresswell-George	Confederate Party	761	27.0
SALISBURY WEST; 3,848 (78.3%)	James Watson Swan	Federal Party	2,069	68.7
SALISBURY WEST; 3,848 (78.3%)	Percy Arthur Newton	Confederate Party	943	31.3
SEBAKWE; 3,331 (78.0%)	John Richard Dendy Young	Confederate Party	1,415	54.5
SEBAKWE; 3,331 (78.0%)	Jacob Letterstedt Smit	Federal Party	1,182	45.5
UMGUZA; 3,675 (78.0%)	Julius Macdonald Greenfield	Federal Party	2,072	72.3
UMGUZA; 3,675 (78.0%)	William Henry Rattham	Confederate Party	795	27.7
UMNIATI; 3,484 (75.5%)	Leslie Major Cullinan	Federal Party	1,491	56.7
UMNIATI; 3,484 (75.5%)	James Angus Graham, Marquess Graham	Confederate Party	1,138	43.3
WESTERN; 3,375 (73.4%)	Robert Francis Halsted	Federal Party	1,593	64.3
WESTERN; 3,375 (73.4%)	Andries Bernardus Mentz	Confederate Party	883	35.7

===== Specially elected African members =====
Constituency Electorate and turnout	Candidate	Party	Votes	%
MASHONALAND; 26,049 (55.9%)	Jasper Zengeza Savanhu	Independent	9,447	64.9
MASHONALAND; 26,049 (55.9%)	Stanlake John William Thompson Samkange	Independent	5,120	35.1
MATABELELAND; 24,425 (53.1%)	Masotsha Mike Hove	Independent	10,558	81.5
MATABELELAND; 24,425 (53.1%)	Joshua Mqabuko Nkomo	Independent	2,400	18.5

===== Specially elected European member =====
Constituency Electorate and turnout	Candidate	Party	Votes	%
SOUTHERN RHODESIA; 50,474 (72.4%)	Percy Ibbotson	Independent	13,402	36.7
SOUTHERN RHODESIA; 50,474 (72.4%)	Ian Finlay McLean	Confederate Party	10,183	27.9
SOUTHERN RHODESIA; 50,474 (72.4%)	James Henderson Farquhar	Independent	8,353	22.8
SOUTHERN RHODESIA; 50,474 (72.4%)	Henry Alfred Holmes	Independent	4,621	12.6

== Changes during the Assembly ==
=== Southern Rhodesia by-election ===
Rev. Percy Ibbotson, the specially elected European member representing African interests from Southern Rhodesia, died on 3 April 1955. When nominations closed on 27 May 1955, Harry Ellinder Davies was the only candidate to replace him, and was therefore declared elected unopposed.

=== Kafue by-election ===
Guy Van Eeden, who became increasingly opposed to Federal Party policies, was expelled from the party in July 1955 and responded by resigning on 8 July 1955 to seek re-election in his constituency of Kafue (Northern Rhodesia). The by-election was held on 6 October 1955.

Constituency Electorate and turnout	Candidate	Party	Votes	%
KAFUE; 1,290 (64.7%)	Guillaume François Marais Van Eeden	Independent	500	59.9
KAFUE; 1,290 (64.7%)	Geoffrey Bernard Beckett	Federal Party	305	36.5
KAFUE; 1,290 (64.7%)	Frank Sheridan Derby	Independent CP	30	3.6

=== Sebakwe by-election ===
J.R. Dendy Young, the Confederate Party member for Sebakwe (Southern Rhodesia), was appointed as a Judge. He resigned on 26 January 1956, and the by-election to succeed him was held on 5 April 1956. By this time, the Confederate Party had been dissolved and replaced by the Dominion Party.

Constituency Electorate and turnout	Candidate	Party	Votes	%
SEBAKWE	Robert Williamson	DP	805	36.7
SEBAKWE	Dr Morris Isaac Hirsch	Federal Party	786	35.8
SEBAKWE	Johannes Mathys de Kock	Com P	603	27.5

=== Mrewa by-election ===
Neville Barrett, the Federal Party member for Mrewa (Southern Rhodesia) died on 15 April 1957. The by-election to replace him was held on 6 June 1957.

Constituency Electorate and turnout	Candidate	Party	Votes	%
MREWA; 3,853 (67.4%)	Winston Joseph Field	DP	1,375	52.9
MREWA; 3,853 (67.4%)	Evan Roy Campbell	Federal Party	1,223	47.1

=== Mashonaland by-election ===
Jasper Savanhu, the specially elected African member for Mashonaland (Southern Rhodesia), had problems with the proposed new constitution in terms of its provisions for voters' qualifications. Although his responsibility was to represent the views of Africans, his electorate were predominantly Europeans. He therefore decided to vote for the proposals, but immediately to resign (1 August 1957) and seek re-election. When nominations closed on 27 September 1957, he was the only candidate nominated, and was therefore declared elected unopposed.

=== Seat vacant at dissolution ===
Paul Brereton (Federal Party), one of the ordinary members for Nyasaland, died on 21 July 1958. The seat was left vacant due to the imminent federal election.

== Sources ==
- Colin Leys, "An Election in Nyasaland." Political Studies, Vol. 5, No. 3 (1957).
