= Ndola Central =

Constituency of the National Assembly of Zambia

Ndola Central is a constituency of the National Assembly of Zambia. It covers Ndola city centre and the suburbs of Kansenshi, Northrise, Nkwazi, Chipulukusu, Kanini and Hillcrest in the Ndola District of Copperbelt Province.

== List of MPs ==
Election year	MP	Party
Ndola
1929	Kennedy Harris	
1932	Kennedy Harris	
1935	Arthur Stephenson	
1938	Arthur Stephenson	
1941	Frederick Roberts	Labour Party
1942 (by-election)	Godfrey Pelletier	
1944	Godfrey Pelletier	
1944 (by-election)	Harold Williams	
1948	Ewain Wilson	
1954	Bill Rendall	Federal Party
1959	Cecil Dennistoun Burney	United Federal Party
Seat abolished
Ndola
1964	Cecil Dennistoun Burney	National Progressive Party
Ndola Central
1968	Misheck Banda	United National Independence Party
Ndola
1973	Misheck Banda	United National Independence Party
1978	Roy Chaiwa	United National Independence Party
1983	Esther Chande	United National Independence Party
1988	Victor Konie	United National Independence Party
1991	Eric Silwamba	Movement for Multi-Party Democracy
1996	Eric Silwamba	Movement for Multi-Party Democracy
Ndola Central
2001	Eric Silwamba	Movement for Multi-Party Democracy
2006	Mark Mushili	Patriotic Front
2008 (by-election)	Mark Mushili	Patriotic Front
2011	Fackson Shamenda	Patriotic Front
2016	Emmanuel Mulenga	Patriotic Front
2021	Frank Tayali	United Party for National Development
2026	Emmanuel Mulenga	Resolute Party

== Election results ==
=== 2021 general elections ===
Candidate	Party	Votes	%
Frank Tayali	United Party for National Development	22,907	53.32
Brenda Mwamba	Patriotic Front	18,826	43.82
Chungu Kapema	Democratic Party	736	1.71
Humphrey Siame	Socialist Party	494	1.15
Total		42,963	100.00
Valid votes		42,963	98.44
Invalid/blank votes		682	1.56
Total votes		43,645	100.00
Registered voters/turnout		62,018	70.37
Source: Election Commission of Zambia

=== 2008 by-election ===
Candidate	Party	Votes	%
Mark Mushili	Patriotic Front	10,720	53.02
Mary Zambezi	Movement for Multi-Party Democracy	7,563	37.40
Joe Kalusa	United Party for National Development	1,417	7.01
Mazuzhyo Chiphwanya	United National Independence Party	339	1.68
Scholastica Mutale	National Restoration Party	181	0.90
Total		20,220	100.00
Valid votes		20,220	98.68
Invalid/blank votes		271	1.32
Total votes		20,491	100.00
Registered voters/turnout		38,776	52.84
Source: Election Commission of Zambia
