= Nalolo District =

Coordinates: 15°00′S 22°30′E

- District
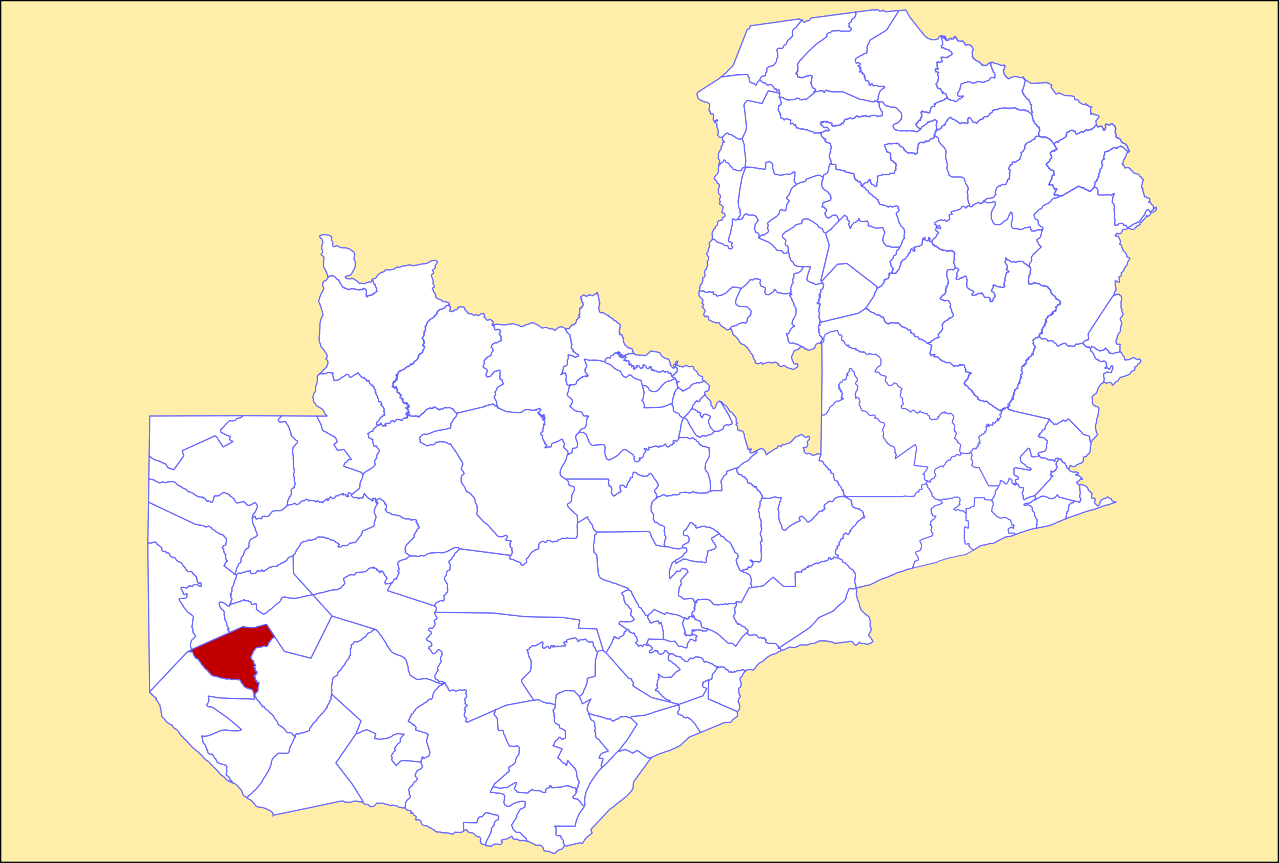
- District location in Zambia
- Country: Zambia
- Province: Western Province

Area
  - Total: 4,742.6 km^{2} (1,831.1 sq mi)

Population (2022)
  - Total: 73,645
  - Density: 15.528/km^{2} (40.218/sq mi)
- Time zone: UTC+2 (CAT)

Nalolo District is a district of Zambia, located in Western Province. It was separated from Senanga District in 2012. As of the 2022 Zambian Census, the district had a population of 73,645 people.
