= Federal Party (Rhodesia and Nyasaland) =

The Federal Party was a party in the Federation of Rhodesia and Nyasaland.

== History ==
The Federal Party was formed on 7 August 1953 by the leaders of the ruling parties in the three territories in order to contest the federal elections in December. The elections saw the new party win 24 of the 35 seats. In the general elections in Northern Rhodesia the following year, it won ten of the twelve elected seats.

In November 1957 the Federal Party merged with the United Rhodesia Party to form the United Federal Party.
