= Lundazi =

Town in Eastern Province, Zambia

Coordinates: 12°18′S 33°11′E

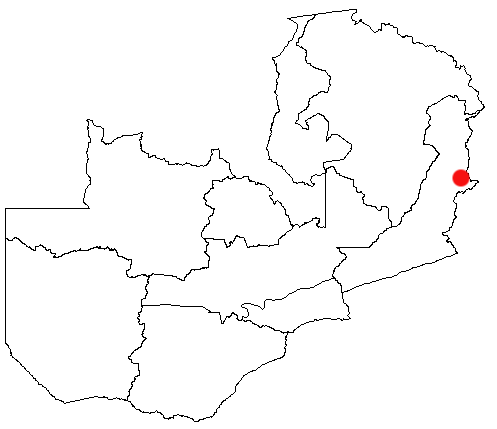
Location of Lundazi in Zambia

Lundazi is a town in the Eastern Province of Zambia, lying near the border with Malawi, around 116 mi (187 km) north of Chipata. Lundazi is known as a "Boma" or administrative centre (boma derives from the Swahili word for a thorn fence, built to protect livestock or travelers' camps). It was a former colonial headquarters. Lundazi is the seat for Lundazi District. It is perched high above the eastern side of the Luangwa Valley, and close to a quiet border crossing (the Mqocha/Mtyocha Border) to Malawi.

Coat of arms

It has an airstrip, schools and a hotel in the form of a Norman castle. The building of the castle was begun in 1948 by the Kenyan born District Commissioner Errol Lancelot Button (1913-1991), who reputedly sketched out its design on the back of a cigarette packet. The castle overlooked a swamp where the Lundazi and Msuzi Rivers met, which Button dammed using soil carried to the site in grass baskets. The dam now supplies Lundazi's water and used to be home to several hippos.

The town also has a district hospital, a post office, two banks, two filling stations, a market, and some small shops.

Lundazi's local political system is made up of 25 wards and 11 chiefdoms. Each ward is represented by an elected councillor and the 11 chiefdoms by two representative councillors in the Lundazi District Council.

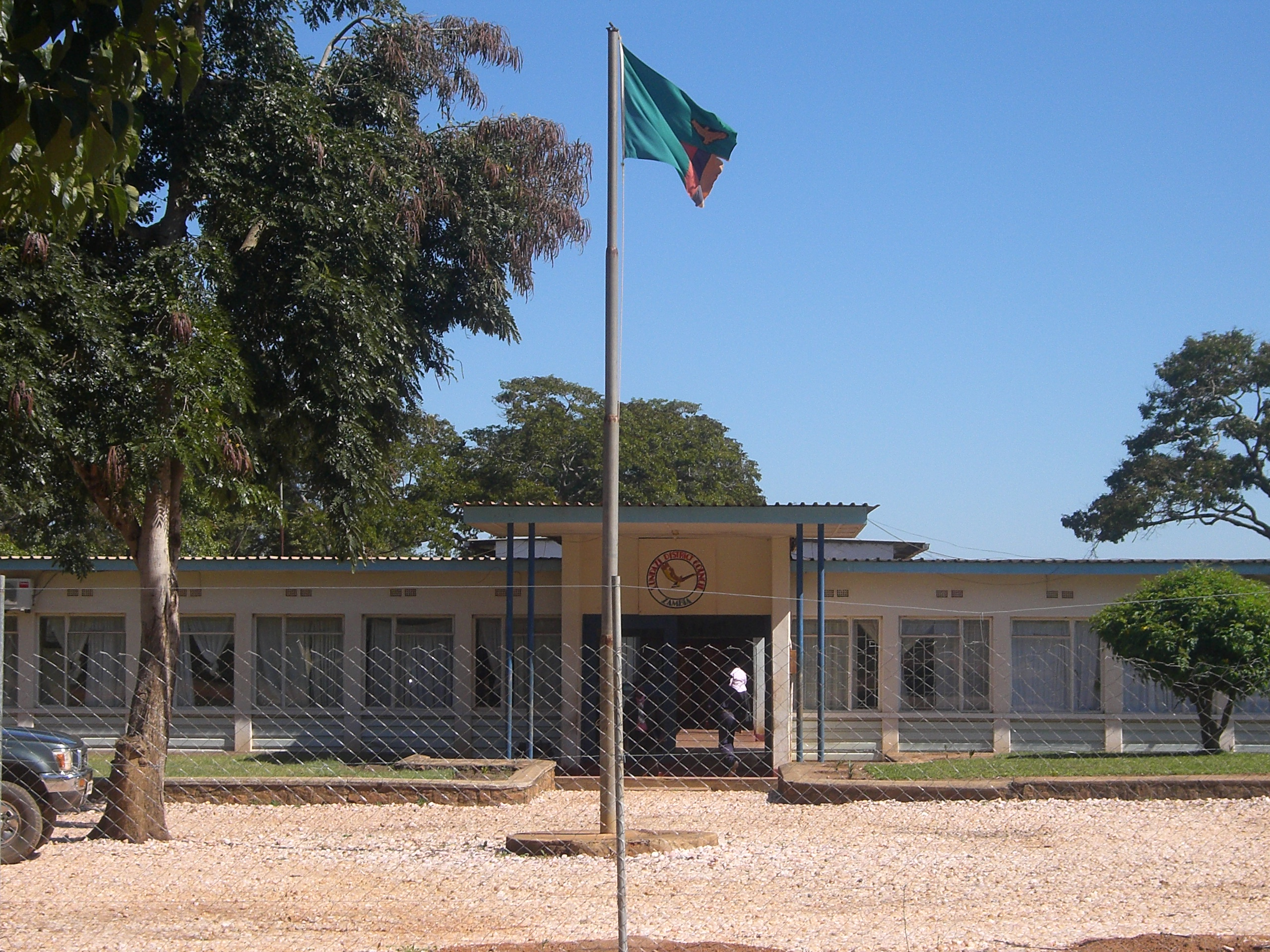
Lundazi Council Building

The spoken language is Tumbuka. The main source of income is agriculture and trading. Most of the traders are Zambians of Asian origin. Lundazi has a popular name 'Box One Kanele' (apparently a corruption of 'Colonel').

== Climate ==
Lundazi features a humid subtropical climate (Köppen: Cwa) with clear wet and dry seasons. October and November are the hottest months, while winters are milder, with July being the coolest month. The wet season, from November to March, experiences significant rainfall, whereas the dry season, from May to October, is marked by minimal precipitation.

Climate data for Lundazi (1991–2020)
Month	Jan	Feb	Mar	Apr	May	Jun	Jul	Aug	Sep	Oct	Nov	Dec	Year
Record high °C (°F)	34.0 (93.2)	37.6 (99.7)	33.9 (93.0)	34.1 (93.4)	34.7 (94.5)	32.2 (90.0)	31.4 (88.5)	35.0 (95.0)	37.5 (99.5)	39.5 (103.1)	40.2 (104.4)	37.7 (99.9)	40.2 (104.4)
Mean daily maximum °C (°F)	28.7 (83.7)	29.1 (84.4)	29.1 (84.4)	28.9 (84.0)	28.5 (83.3)	26.7 (80.1)	25.8 (78.4)	28.0 (82.4)	30.7 (87.3)	32.5 (90.5)	32.8 (91.0)	30.2 (86.4)	29.3 (84.7)
Daily mean °C (°F)	23.4 (74.1)	23.5 (74.3)	23.2 (73.8)	22.0 (71.6)	20.3 (68.5)	18.2 (64.8)	17.4 (63.3)	19.4 (66.9)	22.3 (72.1)	24.6 (76.3)	25.4 (77.7)	24.2 (75.6)	22.0 (71.6)
Mean daily minimum °C (°F)	18.1 (64.6)	17.9 (64.2)	17.3 (63.1)	15.1 (59.2)	12.0 (53.6)	9.6 (49.3)	8.9 (48.0)	10.8 (51.4)	13.8 (56.8)	16.6 (61.9)	18.0 (64.4)	18.2 (64.8)	14.7 (58.5)
Record low °C (°F)	12.4 (54.3)	13.0 (55.4)	9.4 (48.9)	7.8 (46.0)	4.7 (40.5)	0.7 (33.3)	3.0 (37.4)	1.1 (34.0)	7.3 (45.1)	9.0 (48.2)	10.0 (50.0)	10.8 (51.4)	0.7 (33.3)
Average precipitation mm (inches)	230.0 (9.06)	161.6 (6.36)	150.0 (5.91)	31.1 (1.22)	4.8 (0.19)	0.0 (0.0)	0.2 (0.01)	0.1 (0.00)	6.2 (0.24)	4.3 (0.17)	54.3 (2.14)	140.0 (5.51)	782.6 (30.81)
Source: NOAA
