= Chinsali =

Zambian town

- Town
- Location in Zambia
- Coordinates: 10°33′08″S 32°04′09″E
- Country: Zambia
- Province: Muchinga Province
- District: Chinsali District
- Elevation: 4,537 ft (1,383 m)

Population (2010 Census)
  - Total: 15,198
- Postal codes: Kasama town and other areas districts of northern province use the 410 postcode
- Climate: Cwa

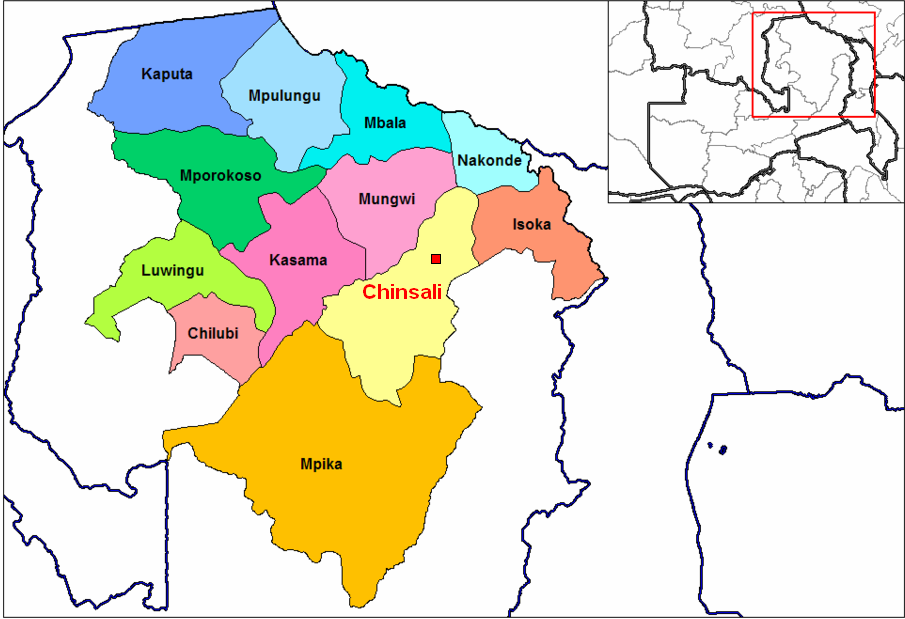
Location of Chinsali town and district

Chinsali is a town in Zambia, which is both the district headquarters of Chinsali District and provincial headquarters of Muchinga Province.

== Location ==
It lies just off the road between Mpika and Isoka (Tanzam Highway; Zambia's Great North Road), about 90 kilometres (56 mi) southwest of Isoka. This is about 176 kilometres (109 mi) north-north-east of Mpika.

Chinsali is located approximately 824 kilometres (512 mi), by road, north-east of the city of Lusaka, the capital and largest city in the country.

The geographical coordinates of Chinsali Town are 10°33'08.0"S, 32°04'09.0"E (Latitude:-10.552222; Longitude:32.069167). The town is nestled at an average elevation of 1,383 metres (4,537 ft) above mean sea level.

== Population ==
The 1990 national population census enumerated 7,509 people in Chinsali. In 2000, the population census that year put the town's population at 11,507. In 2010, that year's population census gave the population total as 15,198. Central Statistical Office Zambia calculated that the population of Chinsali increased at an average rate of 2.82 percent annually, between 2000 and 2010.

Historical population
Year	Pop.	±%
1990	7,509	—
2000	11,507	+53.2%
2010	15,198	+32.1%

== Overview ==
Chinsali is home mainly to the Bemba people, and to their Senior Chief Nkula who is eligible to ascend to the throne of Paramount Chief of the Bemba People based in Mungwi District of Northern Province.

=== Chinsali's notable people ===
Notable people originating from Chinsali include:

- Naomi Chanda, farmer and agriculture trainer
- Simon Mwansa Kapwepwe (1922 - 1980), politician, anti-colonialist, author and Zambia's second vice-president (1967 - 1970).
- Kenneth Kaunda, Zambia's first president. Kaunda (1924 - 2021), born at Lubwa Mission, southwest of Chinsali.
- Alice Lenshina (1920 – 1978), founder and leader the Lumpa Church, a controversial sect embracing a mixture of Christian and animist beliefs.
