= List of members of the Legislative Council of Northern Rhodesia (1944–1948) =

Members of the Legislative Council of Northern Rhodesia from 1944 until 1958 were elected on 29 September 1944. There were eight elected members, nine appointed members and six ex officio members.

== List of members ==
=== Elected members ===
Constituency	Member
Broken Hill	Roy Welensky
Livingstone and Western	Hedley Priest
Luanshya	James Morris
Midland	Hugh Kennedy McKee
Ndola	Godfrey Pelletier
Nkana	Brian Goodwin
North-Eastern	Thomas Spurgeon Page
South-Western	Richard Campbell

==== Replacements ====
Constituency	Previous member	Date	New member
Ndola	Godfrey Pelletier	4 December 1944	Harold Williams
Midland	Hugh Kennedy McKee	25 April 1947	Ernest Sergeant

=== Nominated members ===
Position	Member	Notes
Nominated Official Member	J.B. Clark	Director of European Education
Nominated Official Member	W.C. Fitz-Henry	Director of Public Works
Nominated Official Member	C.J. Lewin	Director of Agriculture
Nominated Official Member	E.H.B. Wickins	Provincial Commissioner, Southern Province
Nominated Unofficial Member	Geoffrey Beckett	
Nominated Unofficial Member	Alfred Harrison	
Nominated Unofficial Member	Charles Fisher	Representing Native Interests
Nominated Unofficial Member	Stewart Gore-Browne	Representing Native Interests
Nominated Unofficial Member	Robert Selby Taylor	Representing Native Interests

==== Replacements ====
Position	Previous member	Date	New member	Notes
Nominated Official Member	W.C. Fitz-Henry	6 May 1946	A.L. Simpkins	Director of Public Works
Nominated Official Member	E.H.B. Wickins	30 November 1946	Harold Watmore	Provincial Commissioner, Western Province
Nominated Unofficial Member	Charles Fisher	30 November 1946	Hope Hay	Representing Native Interests
Nominated Unofficial Member	Alfred Harrison	30 November 1946	Norman Cook	
Nominated Unofficial Member	Hope Hay	1946	Edward Nightingale	Representing Native Interests
Nominated Official Member	Harold Watmore	31 May 1947	F. Crawford	Economic Secretary
Nominated Official Member	A.L. Simpkins	20 September 1947	A.T. Williams	Administrative Secretary
Nominated Official Member	J.B. Clark	20 September 1947	J.E. Workman	Commissioner of Police
Nominated Official Member	C.J. Lewin	20 September 1947	L.F. Leversedge	Provincial Commissioner, Southern Province
Nominated Official Member	L.F. Leversedge	15 November 1947	L.W.G. Eccles	Commissioner for Local Government and African Housing, Commissioner for Mines
Nominated Official Member	J.E. Workman	15 November 1947	J.R. Chadwick	Director of European Education
Nominated Official Member	J.R. Chadwick	6 January 1948	J.B. Clark	Director of European Education
Nominated Official Member	L.W.G. Eccles	6 March 1948	Harold Watmore	Senior Provincial Commissioner
Nominated Official Member	Harold Watmore	5 June 1948	L.W.G. Eccles	Commissioner for Local Government and African Housing, Commissioner for Mines
Nominated Official Member	J.B. Clark	9 June 1948	R.A. Nicholson	Economic Secretary
Nominated Official Member	F. Crawford	17 June 1948	E.F. Martin	Director of Agriculture
Nominated Unofficial Member	Robert Selby Taylor	June 1948	Killian Flynn	Representing Native Interests

=== Ex officio members ===
Position	Member
Governor	John Waddington, Harold Cartmel-Robinson, Robert Stanley, Gilbert Rennie
Attorney-General	H.G. Morgan, Edgar Unsworth
Chief Secretary to the Government	Harold Cartmel-Robinson, J.H. Wallace, Robert Stanley, R.S. Hudson
Director of Medical Services	J.F.C. Haslam, P.B. Robinson
Financial Secretary	George Thornton, Ralph Nicholson
Secretary for Native Affairs	R.S. Hudson, Harold Watmore
