= List of members of the Legislative Council of Northern Rhodesia (1941–1944) =

Members of the Legislative Council of Northern Rhodesia from 1941 until 1944 were elected on 29 August 1941. There were eight elected members.

== List of members ==
=== Elected members ===
Constituency	Party	Member
Broken Hill	Roy Welensky	Labour Party
Livingstone and Western	Francis Sinclair	Labour Party
Luanshya	Michael McGann	Labour Party
Midland	Hugh Kennedy McKee	
Ndola	Frederick Roberts	Labour Party
Nkana	Martin Visagie	Labour Party
North-Eastern	Thomas Spurgeon Page	
Southern	Richard Campbell	

==== Replacements ====
Constituency	Previous member	Date	New member
Ndola	Frederick Roberts	1942	Godfrey Pelletier

=== Nominated members ===
Position	Member	Notes
Nominated Unofficial Member	Stewart Gore-Browne	Representing Native Interests
