= 1944 Northern Rhodesian general election =

General elections were held in Northern Rhodesia on 29 September 1944.

== Electoral system ==
The eight elected members of the Legislative Council were elected from eight single-member constituencies. There were a total of 6,527 registered voters.

Constituency	Settlements	Registered voters
Broken Hill	Broken Hill, Mkushi, Serenje	950
Livingstone and Western	Balovale, Kalabo, Livingstone, Mankoya, Mongu–Lealui, Senanga, Sesheke	469
Luanshya	Luanshya, Mufulira	1,497
Midland	Broken Hill (South), Lusaka, Mumbwa	648
Ndola	Fort Rosebery, Kasempa, Kawambwa, Mwinilunga, Ndola	656
Nkana	Chingola, Nkana	1,771
North-Eastern	Abercorn, Chinsali, Fort Jameson, Isoka, Kasama, Lundazi, Luwingu, Mpika, Mporokoso, Petauke	270
Southern	Mazabuka, Namwala	266
Source: Legislative Council of Northern Rhodesia

== Campaign ==
All constituencies were contested by more than one candidate with the exception of Broken Hill, where Labour Party leader Roy Welensky was returned unopposed.

The incumbent members for Livingstone and Western (Francis Sinclair), Luanshya (Michael McGann) and Nkana (Martin Visagie) did not run for re-election.

== Results ==
Candidate	Party	Votes	%	Notes
Broken Hill
Roy Welensky	Labour Party			Re-elected unopposed
Total				
Livingstone and Western
Hedley Priest	Labour Party	223	69.91	Elected
Robert Hood Orr	Independent Labour	96	30.09	
Total		319	100.00	
Registered voters/turnout		469	–	
Luanshya
James Morris	Independent	406	50.50	Elected
Francis Edward John Patrick Murray	Labour Party	398	49.50	
Total		804	100.00	
Registered voters/turnout		1,497	–	
Midland
Hugh Kennedy McKee	Independent	212	40.85	Re-elected
Marais von Eeden	Independent	183	35.26	
Edwin Bernard Evans	Labour Party	124	23.89	
Total		519	100.00	
Registered voters/turnout		648	–	
Ndola
Godfrey Pelletier	Independent	223	50.57	Re-elected
Charles Allan	Labour Party	218	49.43	
Total		441	100.00	
Registered voters/turnout		656	–	
Nkana
Brian Goodwin	Independent Labour	573	55.96	Elected
James Knock Wykerd	Labour Party	451	44.04	
Total		1,024	100.00	
Registered voters/turnout		1,771	–	
North-Eastern
Thomas Spurgeon Page		94	51.93	Re-elected
Grant Bruce Robertson	Independent	87	48.07	
Total		181	100.00	
Registered voters/turnout		270	–	
Southern
Richard Ernest Campbell	Independent	95	51.35	Re-elected
John Milton Walker		90	48.65	
Total		185	100.00	
Registered voters/turnout		266	–	
Source: East Africa and Rhodesia, Legislative Council of Northern Rhodesia

== Aftermath ==
Following the elections, a petition was sent to the Governor requesting the annulment of the result in Ndola. An enquiry by the Acting Chief Justice found that seven ballots had been improperly rejected, meaning that the result would have been a tie. A by-election was held on 4 December, in which the original winner Godfrey Pelletier opted not to run. Harold Williams was elected in his place.

== See also ==
- List of members of the Legislative Council of Northern Rhodesia (1944–48)
