= Nkana (disambiguation) =

Nkana is part of the Zambian city of Kitwe. Nkana might also refer to:

- Nkana (constituency), Zambian political constituency
- Nkana F.C., Zambian football club
- Nkana Stadium, Zambian football stadium
