= 1935 Copperbelt strike =

Mineworkers' strike in Northern Rhodesia

- Date: 29 May 1935
- Location: Mufulira, Nkana and Roan Antelope
- Cause: Tax increase
- Deaths: 6
- Injuries: 20

A major strike broke out among African mineworkers in the Copperbelt Province of Northern Rhodesia (now Zambia) on 29 May 1935 in protest against taxes levied by the British colonial administration. The strike involved three of the province's four major copper mines: those in Mufulira, Nkana and Roan Antelope. Near the latter, six protesters were killed by police and the strike ended. Although it failed, the strike was the first organized industrial agitation in Northern Rhodesia and is viewed by some as the first overt action against colonial rule. It caught the attention of a number of African townsmen, leading to the creation of trade unions and African nationalist politics, and is seen as the birth of African nationalism.

The strike and others in Africa during the period dramatically changed the British government's urban and migration policies. The unrest gave missionaries a chance to respond to the "Watchtower movement", (Note: The Watchtower (locally called Kitawala) was a millenarian religious movement, led by literate Africans, which derived its ideologies from North American religious movements. There were as many as five Watchtower movements, but the one led by Joseph Sibakwe during the 1930s was the most prominent. In general, adherents opposed colonial rule. By 1936, the movement was affiliated to Jehovah's Witnesses. As per the account of Tordoff (1974), the movement was one of the earliest drivers of independence movement in the country and they opposed political authority even after independence during the rule of United National Independence Party (UNIP) in 1963.) joining the mining companies to provide a Christian education and create a disciplined workforce. The colonial administration, foreseeing a future drop in copper prices, also created social-service schemes for rural relatives of the urban workers.

== Background ==
=== Colonialism in Northern Rhodesia ===
Location of Northern Rhodesia in Africa

The Copperbelt was a region of Northern Rhodesia known for its rich copper ore deposits. Cecil John Rhodes, a British capitalist and empire builder, was the main driver of British expansion north of the Limpopo River into south-central Africa. In 1895, Rhodes asked his American scout Frederick Russell Burnham to look for minerals and how to improve river navigation in the region; during this trek, Burnham discovered large copper deposits along the Kafue River. Rhodes brought British influence into the region by obtaining mineral rights from local chiefs through questionable treaties. The Anglo-Portuguese Treaty of 1891, signed in Lisbon on 11 June 1891 by the United Kingdom and Portugal, fixed the boundary between territories administered by the British South Africa Company (BSAC) in North-Eastern Rhodesia and Portuguese Mozambique. It also fixed the boundary between the BSAC-administered territory of North-Western Rhodesia (now in Zambia) and Portuguese Angola, although the boundary with Angola was not marked on the ground until later. The northern border of the British territory in North-Eastern Rhodesia and the British Central Africa Protectorate was agreed in an 1890 Anglo-German treaty which also fixed the (very short) boundary between North-Western Rhodesia and German South-West Africa, now Namibia. The boundary between the Congo Free State and British territory was fixed by an 1894 treaty, although minor adjustments were made until the 1930s. The border between the British Central Africa Protectorate and North-Eastern Rhodesia was fixed in 1891 at the drainage divide between Lake Malawi and the Luangwa River, and the boundary between North-Western Rhodesia and Southern Rhodesia became the Zambezi River in 1898. Northern Rhodesia was under BSAC control until 1924, when it became part of the British Empire.

=== Mining ===
The discovery of large deposits of copper sulfide during the 1900s encouraged large mining companies to invest in Northern Rhodesia. South African interest in the region was led by the Anglo American Corporation, which gained an interest in the Bwana Mkubwa Company in 1924 and acquired a one-third interest in Mufulira in 1928. That year, Anglo American acquired control of the Nkana mine at Kitwe and formed Rhodesian Anglo American; shareholders included the United States, South African finance houses and the British South Africa Company. As the BSAC purchased shares in Rhodesian Anglo American, the latter became a major shareholder in BSAC. By 1930, Chester Beatty's Rhodesian Selection Trust and Ernest Oppenheimer's Anglo-American Corporation controlled most of the region's mining. The Roan Antelope and Nkana mines began commercial production in 1931.

== 1935 strike ==
=== Development ===
The emergence of mining increased the migration of native African people in search of employment to the province from elsewhere in Africa. The mining industry improved the standard of living of those living along Northern Rhodesia's railroads, and increased the influx of white people, the Europeans from South Africa who wanted to maintain their superiority over the native African population. Native Africans were poorly treated by the whites and discouraged from working in the mines; this evolved into a racial struggle. The high rate of immigration to the region increased the number of unplanned settlements. The BSAC introduced a hut tax in 1901 in North-Eastern Rhodesia and between 1904 and 1913 in North-Western Rhodesia for all migrants. The tax was high (in some cases, six months' wages), and intended to create a system of debt bondage and generate income for investment in other mines. Unrest caused by tax increases was suppressed with the help of the British South Africa Police. The imposition of tax was a strategy adopted to create bond labour and sustain demand during the 1920s when the demand for miners was higher. The company was able to maintain low wages on account of predominance of migrant labour from rural regions. The African miners had three major issues: low wages compared to European miners, a prohibition against working in mines reserved for Europeans despite high skills, and workplace harassment and brutality.

The Great Depression (1929–35) led to a fall in European copper prices which severely damaged the economy of the Copperbelt. In February 1931 the Mkubwa mine was shut down, followed over the next few months by the Chamishi, Nchanga and Mulfira mines. Construction work at the Roan Antelope and Nkana mines was nearing completion at this time, leading to large-scale unemployment; the mines employed 31,941 people in 1930, and 6,677 by the end of 1932. Many unemployed African workers remained, instead of returning to their rural homes. During the period between 1931 and 1932, the European population in the region reduced by 25 per cent. In 1935, the Northern Rhodesian administration doubled urban taxes and reduced them in rural areas to counter the depression and related losses incurred by the closure of one of the region's four mines. The provincial commissioner implemented the tax in May (retroactive to 1 January) after the signing of the Native Tax Amendment Ordinance, and was aware of the latter.

=== Strike ===
1935 Copperbelt strike (Zambia)

The strike involved three of the province's four major copper mines: the mines at Mufulira, Nkana and Roan Antelope. On the morning of 21 May 1935, police at Mulfulira announced that taxes were raised from 12 to 15 shillings a year. The strike was spontaneous, with morning-shift miners refusing to go underground. It was led by three Zambians from the Northern Province: William Sankata, Ngostino Mwamba and James Mutali at the Mufulira mine. The other African miners refused to report to work, shouted slogans against the authorities and threw stones at them and non-supportive Africans. At the other two mines, the strike was less spontaneous than at Mufulira (where the tax increase was received with disbelief) and police arrested leaders as a precautionary measure. News of the Mufulira strike spread to the other two mines with the inflow of miners from Mufulira. Beni dancers, who developed the dance form during the colonial era and who mimicked military and colonial administration with music and aesthetic expression, were instrumental in structured communication during the strike. African workers went on strike in Nkana on 27 May, but it failed and ended the following day due to poor leadership. The strike at Roan Antelope, where some tribal leaders participated, turned violent. On 29 May, a large crowd gathered around the compound containing police, officials, clerks and elders; protesters began throwing stones and shouting slogans. The police panicked and fired, leading to the deaths of six protesters and injuring 17 others. Shocked at the shootout, the strikers called off the strike. According to a UNESCO International Scientific Committee report, organized demonstrations were held on 22 May at the Mulfra mine and spread to Nkana on 26 May and the Luansha mines on 28 May. Casualties were reported as 28 killed or injured, with an unspecified number of arrests.

== Aftermath ==
=== Investigation ===
Immediately after the strike, a commission headed by Russell was appointed by the British colonial administration to investigate its causes. The commission reported that industrialization and de-tribalization were the most important problems in Northern Rhodesia, and the tax's abrupt implementation led to the strike. The report disregarded the role of Beni, but acknowledged that the dancers were primarily involved in recreation and welfare activities. It described two systems of authority: "The choice lies between the establishment of native authority, together with frequent repatriation of natives to their villages; or alternatively, the acceptance of definite de-tribalization and industrialization of the mining under European urban control". After the enquiry, Hubert Winthrop Young, governor of Northern Rhodesia from 1935 to 1938, established a tribal leaders' advisory council for Africans in the Copperbelt similar to the one at the Roan Antelope mine. Some historians considered it the conventional indirect rule imposed after similar incidents to avoid future uprisings.

=== Reform ===
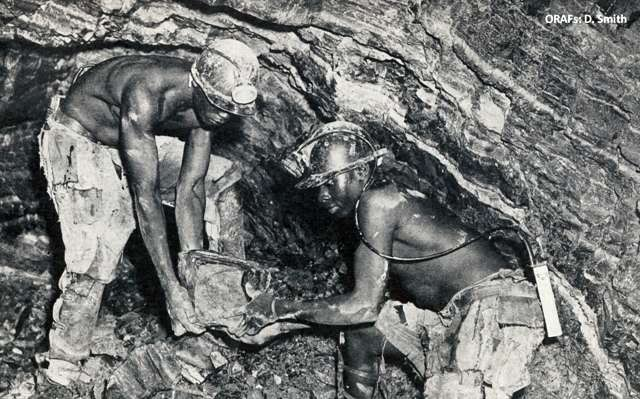
Rhodesian miners during the 1950s

After 1935, the mines were reopened and there was steady growth in the region. According to David M. Gordon, the unrest gave missionaries a chance to respond to the Watchtower movement in a coordinated fashion.^{[a]} The London Missionary Society and the Church of Scotland worked together after the strike, saying that the lack of education and religious instruction were contributing factors. The missionaries and the mining companies said that a Christian education would create a disciplined workforce, a belief which was called the spiritual wing of industrial capitalism. The region's Protestant mission established the United Mission of Copperbelt (UMCB), which led to the establishment of Protestant bodies such as the Church of Central Africa in Rhodesia (CCAR) in 1945 and the United Church of Central Africa in Rhodesia in 1958 (which became the United Church of Zambia in 1965).

Most of the mining companies felt that the expected recovery would result in a labor shortage and challenge economic recovery. The government believed that if copper prices fell in the future, similar effects would be experienced. The colonial administration implemented two schemes to maintain the relationship of urban workers with their rural homelands. Health-service expenditures by rural relatives of urban workers were borne by the government, and the rural male migration of the working population was reduced.

== Significance ==
Historians believe that the strike, and other strikes in Africa during the period, changed the urban and migration policies of the British government in Africa. Governor Hubert Young, after a long struggle, obtained research funding of labour migration in Africa. Historian Godfrey Wilson studied urban African labour from 1939 to 1940, but his work was halted. Although the strike achieved little at the time, it is seen a key moment in the emergence of African nationalism in Zambia. African townsmen discovered their identity, leading to trade unionism and the gradual emergence of anti-colonial politics. The actions by British authorities led to five years of prosperity for the mining companies; European miners struck for higher pay and were rewarded. In 1940, there were several mine strikes in the province which lasted over a week; 17 workers were killed and 65 injured.

== See also ==
- Bibliography of the history of Zambia
