= Bledisloe Commission =

1937–9 Royal Commission examining the potential Federation of Rhodesia and Nyasaland

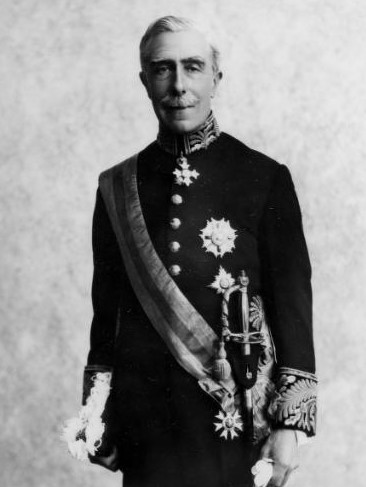
Charles Bathurst, 1st Viscount Bledisloe

The Bledisloe Commission, also known as the Rhodesia-Nyasaland Royal Commission, was a Royal Commission, appointed in 1937 and undertaking its enquiries between 1937 and 1939. to examine the possible closer union of the three British territories in Central Africa, Southern Rhodesia, Northern Rhodesia and Nyasaland. These territories were to some degree economically inter-dependent, and it was suggested that an association would promote their rapid development. Its chairman was Lord Bledisloe.

In 1939, the majority of the Commission recommended a union of Northern Rhodesia and Nyasaland, whose African populations would remain under British trusteeship. It also proposed that there would be strong economic integration between these united territories and Southern Rhodesia, but ruled-out any political amalgamation involving Southern Rhodesia unless its overtly racial policies were changed and there was some form of representation of African interests in the legislatures of all three territories. A minority of the Commission appended a report which recommended the early amalgamation of the three territories, largely on economic grounds, despite the almost unanimous objections of Africans in all three. The commission's recommendations were not put in place owing to the Second World War, but closer ties in Central Africa were developed during the war. After the war, the white minority administrations of Northern and of Southern Rhodesia renewed calls for a union, and in 1953 they achieved this in the Federation of Rhodesia and Nyasaland.

== Background to the Commission ==
=== Developments in Central Africa ===
Northern Rhodesia and Southern Rhodesia were administered until the 1920s by a Chartered company, the British South Africa Company under a Royal Charter dating from 1889. A Legislative Council for Southern Rhodesia was created in 1898, initially with a minority of elected seats and an electorate formed only of the better-off white settlers. However, the European franchise was extended: from 1914 there was an elected majority on the Legislative Council, and a campaign for self-government gained strength. As the British South Africa Company charter was due to expire in 1924, a referendum was held in Southern Rhodesia in 1922, when the electorate was given a choice between responsible government and entry into the Union of South Africa. Those in favour of responsible government won a significant, but not overwhelming, majority. When British South Africa Company rule in Northern Rhodesia came to an end in 1924, the territory became a protectorate, with a governor and Executive Council and Legislative Council, consisting of a majority of officials and a minority of unofficial members elected solely by European voters.

As early as 1915, the British South Africa Company proposed amalgamating Southern Rhodesia and Northern Rhodesia, but this was rejected by the Southern Rhodesian legislature in 1917, on the grounds that this might prevent Southern Rhodesia obtaining self-government. The option of amalgamation was again rejected in 1921 for the same reason. When the Southern Rhodesian electorate voted for self-determination in 1922, it could not have had any expectation of future amalgamation with Northern Rhodesia as Britain had not conceded the possibility of amalgamation to the Southern Rhodesian electorate to prevent it from voting to join the Union of South Africa. However, on a visit to Southern Rhodesia in 1927, the Conservative Colonial Secretary, Leo Amery gave Southern Rhodesia settlers the impression that he endorsed their claim to incorporate all or part of Northern Rhodesia.

At the end of the First World War, the European population of Northern Rhodesia was tiny, about 3,000 compared with ten times as many in Southern Rhodesia. This white population increased rapidly after the discovery of the Copperbelt in the 1920s, and Northern Rhodesian settlers wanted self-determination with a European minority electorate, following the model of Southern Rhodesia but separate from it. As long as Leo Amery was Colonial Secretary, he attempted to qualify the principle that the interests of Africans in tropical Africa would be treated as paramount, and gave tacit encouragement to these Northern Rhodesian settler aspirations. In the mid-1920s, Northern Rhodesia and Southern Rhodesia seemed to drifting apart. However, once the British government appeared to reject the idea of further white minority governments in Africa, talk of amalgamation resumed.

=== British government reaction ===
The British government appointed the Hilton Young Commission on the possible closer union of the British territories in East and Central Africa in 1927. Its majority view, when it reported in 1929, was that Northern Rhodesia and Nyasaland should seek closer links with East Africa, although Sir Edward Hilton Young's minority report favoured linking these two territories with Southern Rhodesia on economic grounds. His minority report also suggested the partition of Northern Rhodesia, with its central area joining Southern Rhodesia: this was opposed by the British government. Even before the commission's report was published, there were discussions between representatives of the settlers in Northern Rhodesia and the Southern Rhodesian government in 1928 on the terms of an amalgamation of the two Rhodesias. The Southern Rhodesia plan was for total union, with Northern Rhodesia becoming an undifferentiated part of a single colony. Northern Rhodesian settlers wanted minority rule, and were only prepared to join Southern Rhodesia if that were the only way to achieve this. Once Southern Rhodesian had secured self-government, it wanted union with Northern Rhodesia to strengthen its economy. It offered generous representation for Northern Rhodesian Europeans in a combined parliament, and guaranteed ministerial office in any combined government.

The Colonial Secretary of the Labour Government, Lord Passfield, published his Memorandum on native policy in East Africa in June 1930. His statement of colonial policy was an emphatic reassertion of the principle of paramountcy of African interests. His Memorandum stated that no further white minority governments would be permitted, dismissing settler aspirations of self-government in Kenya and Northern Rhodesia. This turned Northern Rhodesian Europeans against association with East Africa and towards union with Southern Rhodesia. In 1933, a substantial minority in the Northern Rhodesian legislature favoured amalgamation with Southern Rhodesia, despite vigorous African opposition. This group was still in the minority, as a greater number of settlers were cautious about being marginalised by the much greater numbers of Europeans in the south, although even they had begun to accept that amalgamation was likely. The failure of the British government to build a rail link from Northern Rhodesia to Tanganyika, as envisaged in the Hilton Young report, made Northern Rhodesia's economy very dependent on Southern Rhodesian railways, and added economic to political reasons for a union.

=== Pressures towards amalgamation ===
Northern Rhodesia's mining industry suffered a major downturn in the 1930s, which made the possibility of self-government even more remote. When representatives of both territories met in January 1936 at Victoria Falls, it was the Northern Rhodesians who pushed for amalgamation and representatives of the Southern Rhodesian Labour Party who blocked it, because Southern Rhodesian racial policies, including strict job reservation and segregation, could not be applied in the north owing to British government objections. In most of these discussions, Nyasaland was ignored, although the Governor of Nyasaland was involved in some of the discussions leading up to the Victoria Falls Conference. The European community in Nyasaland was very small, about 1,750 in the 1930s. Until the mid-1930s, settlers there had no strong political ambitions and were not enthusiastic about a Central African Union which would be dominated by Europeans in Southern Rhodesia. In 1935, some European settlers formed a Greater Rhodesia League in Nyasaland, which favoured amalgamation with the Rhodesias as a way of establishing a regime of prosperity and security. However, in their memorandum to the Bledisloe Commission, the major settlers' organisations in Nyasaland proposed only an eventual amalgamation, because of fears that the Southern Rhodesian white community, whose economic interests conflicted with those of Nyasaland, would become dominant in a Central Africa union.

Despite differences in emphasis between the different territories, Maurice Hankey, 1st Baron Hankey, the Cabinet Secretary, who visited southern Africa in 1934, considered that the prevailing attitude among European settlers there was that they intended to keep power for as long as possible. In 1937, a Commission of Inquiry was appointed following a Southern Rhodesian proposal for amalgamation with Northern Rhodesia. The Commission noted the different constitutional arrangements between Southern Rhodesia, which had internal self-government and a Legislative Council that included elected members and Northern Rhodesia and Nyasaland, under Colonial Office regulation with advisory Legislative Councils composed of officials and nominees. It did however recommend the setting up of an Inter-Territorial Council consisting of the Prime Minister of Southern Rhodesia and the governors of Northern Rhodesia and Nyasaland.

== The Bledisloe Commission ==
=== Formation and hearings ===
Under pressure from Europeans in both Northern and Southern Rhodesia, particularly from Godfrey Huggins, who had been the Prime Minister of Southern Rhodesia since 1933, the British government agreed in 1937 to set up a Royal Commission. The chairman was Lord Bledisloe, a former Governor-General of New Zealand. The other five Commissioners were Patrick Ashley Cooper, (later Sir Patrick) a governor of the Hudson's Bay Company, two Commissioners who had had experience of Colonial service, one MP who was also a lawyer and another who had considerable experience in mining and its labour policy. Its terms if reference were to consider a possible closer association between the two Rhodesias and Nyasaland.

The Commission took evidence from Europeans in all three territories, but from Africans only in Northern Rhodesia and Nyasaland and not in Southern Rhodesia. Opposition to union within Southern Rhodesia came not only from the Native Associations, representing the more educated and politically aware Africans, but also the Native Authorities, the traditional tribal chiefs. This united opposition to amalgamation impressed the Commissioners. When they visited Nyasaland in 1939, a wide range of Nyasaland Africans, many of whom had worked in Southern Rhodesia and experienced its racial policies, expressed their total objection to any form of amalgamation. A similar level of opposition was found in Northern Rhodesia when the Commissioners visited in 1938, with this opposition being led by the traditional leaders, who wished to keep the safeguard of British trusteeship against race-based Southern Rhodesian labour and land policies. It drew attention to the small number of Europeans in Northern Rhodesia, and the even smaller number in Nyasaland. African interests in the two northern territories had therefore to be protected against Southern Rhodesian racial discrimination.

=== Main recommendations ===
The Commission cautioned against overemphasising conflicts of interest between black and white in Central Africa, and suggested that Africans could benefit socially and economically from European enterprise. However, it suggested that two major changes would be necessary to appease opposition to amalgamation from Africans north of the Zambezi. Firstly, the Southern Rhodesian pass laws and other overtly racial policies would have to be changed, Secondly, there should be some form of representation of African interests in the legislatures of each territory, possibly through the nomination of European representatives.

The Commission considered the complete amalgamation of the three territories. It thought that a looser form of federal union would make it more difficult to plan the future development of Central Africa as a whole. It also commented unfavourably on an alternative under which the eastern part of Northern Rhodesia and Nyasaland would remain as separate entities outside the union, as they would not benefit from the economy of the Copperbelt. Even though the Commission advocated future amalgamation, a majority of its members ruled this option out as an immediate possibility, because of legitimate African concerns and objections. This majority favoured an early union of Northern Rhodesia and Nyasaland into one unit which would co-operate economically with Southern Rhodesia as a possible first step to uniting all three territories later. Two leading Commissioners, Lord Bledisloe and Patrick (later Sir Patrick) Ashley Cooper, favoured complete and early amalgamation and wrote their minority report accordingly, despite contrary advice from Colonial Office permanent officials.

== Later events ==
During the Second World War, co-operation between the three territories increased with a joint secretariat in 1941 and an advisory Central African Council in 1945, made up of the three governors and one leading European politician from each territory. After the war, the Labour Party Colonial Secretary from 1946 to 1950, Arthur Creech Jones, was reluctant to discuss any plans for amalgamation with Huggins, the Prime Minister of Southern Rhodesia because of opposition from Africans and within his own party. He did not entirely rule out federation, which had been proposed by a conference held at Victoria Falls in 1949 between the Southern Rhodesian government, and the elected, or "unofficial" members of the Northern Rhodesia Legislative Council led by Roy Welensky, without any Africans present. It was left to his successor in post in 1950 to 1951, James Griffiths, to begin exploratory talks with Huggins and Welensky representing the white minorities of both Rhodesian governments, subject to the opinion of the majority African populations being ascertained. After a change in the British government in 1951, the incoming Conservative Colonial Secretary, Oliver Lyttelton removed the condition of sounding out African opinion in November 1951, and pushed through the Federation of Rhodesia and Nyasaland against strong opposition in 1953.

== Published sources ==
- H. I Wetherell, (1979). Settler Expansionism in Central Africa: The Imperial Response of 1931 and Subsequent Implications, African Affairs, Vol. 78, No. 311.
- E A Walter, (1963). The Cambridge History of the British Empire: South Africa, Rhodesia and the High Commission Territories, Cambridge University Press.
- B Raftopoulos and A S Mlambo, editors (2009). Becoming Zimbabwe: A History from the Pre-colonial Period to 2008, African Books Collective. ISBN 978-1-77922-083-7.
- C Leys and C Pratt, (1960). A New Deal in Central Africa, Praeger.
- R Tangri, (1971). Colonial and Settler Pressures and the African Move to the Politics of Representation and Union in Nyasaland, Journal of African History, Vol. 13, No. 2.
- M Chanock, (1977). Unconsummated union: Britain, Rhodesia and South Africa, 1900–45, Manchester University Press. ISBN 978-0-7190-0634-0
- J McCracken, (2012) A History of Malawi: 1859–1966, Woodbridge, James Currey. ISBN 978-1-84701-050-6.
- H S Meebelo, (1971). Reaction to Colonialism: A Prelude to the Politics of Independence in Northern Zambia 1893–1939, Manchester University Press. ISBN 978-0-7190-1029-3
- E Windrich, (1975). The Rhodesian Problem: A Documentary Record 1923–1973, Routledge, ISBN 0-7100-8080-8
- A Okoth, (2006). A History of Africa: African nationalism and the de-colonisation process [1915–1995], Volume 2 East African Publishers. ISBN 978-9966-25-358-3
