= Governor Rennie =

Governor Rennie may refer to:

- George Rennie (sculptor and politician) (1802–1860), Governor of the Falkland Islands from 1848 to 1855
- Gilbert Rennie (1895–1981), Governor of Northern Rhodesia from 1948 to 1954
- John Shaw Rennie (1917–2002), Governor of Vanuatu from 1955 to 1962 and Governor of Mauritius from 1962 to 1968
