= Governor Benson =

Governor Benson may refer to:

- Arthur Benson (1907–1987), Governor of Northern Rhodesia from 1954 to 1959
- Craig Benson (born 1954), 79th Governor of New Hampshire
- Elmer Austin Benson (1895–1985), 24th Governor of Minnesota
- Frank W. Benson (politician) (1858–1911), 12th Governor of Oregon
- Jocelyn Benson (born 1977), 50th Governor-elect of Michigan
