= 1941 Northern Rhodesian general election =

General elections were held in Northern Rhodesia on 29 August 1941. All five Labour Party candidates won their seats.

== Electoral system ==
The eight elected members of the Legislative Council (an increase from seven in the 1938 elections) were elected from eight single-member constituencies. The additional seat was created by splitting Ndola into two to form the new constituency of Luanshya. The Northern Constituency was renamed Broken Hill and most of its area was transferred to the new North-Eastern constituency, which replaced Eastern. There were a total of 5,638 registered voters.

Constituency	Settlements	Registered voters
Broken Hill	Broken Hill, Mkushi, Serenje	837
Livingstone and Western	Balovale, Kalabo, Livingstone, Mankoya, Mongu–Lealui, Senanga, Sesheke	497
Luanshya	Luanshya, Mufulira	1,253
Midland	Broken Hill (South), Lusaka, Mumbwa	556
Ndola	Fort Rosebery, Kasempa, Kawambwa, Mwinilunga, Ndola	570
Nkana	Chingola, Nkana	1,390
North-Eastern	Abercorn, Chinsali, Fort Jameson, Isoka, Kasama, Lundazi, Luwingu, Mpika, Mporokoso, Petauke	253
Southern	Mazabuka, Namwala	282
Source: Legislative Council of Northern Rhodesia

== Results ==
Constituency	Candidate	Party	Votes	%	Notes
Broken Hill	Roy Welensky	Labour Party	Unopposed		Elected
Livingstone and Western	Francis Sinclair	Labour Party			Elected
Livingstone and Western	Leopold Moore				Defeated
Luanshya	Michael McGann	Labour Party			Elected
Luanshya	I.H. Webb				
Midland	Hugh Kennedy McKee		Unopposed		Elected
Ndola	Frederick Roberts	Labour Party			Elected
Ndola	Arthur Stephenson				Defeated
Nkana	Martin Visagie	Labour Party			Elected
Nkana	Albert Smith				Defeated
Nkana	Catherine Olds				
North-Eastern	Thomas Spurgeon Page		Unopposed		Elected
Southern	Richard Ernest Campbell		Unopposed		Elected
Source: East Africa and Rhodesia

== Aftermath ==
Following the elections Stewart Gore-Browne was reappointed to the Legislative Council by the Governor as the member representing native interests.

== See also ==
- List of members of the Legislative Council of Northern Rhodesia (1941–1944)
