= Binwell Mpundu =

Zambian politician (born 1982)

Honorable Binwell Mpundu

Member of the National Assembly
- In office 2021 – 2026
- Preceded by: Alexander Chiteme
- Succeeded by: Alexander Chiteme
- Constituency: Nkana

Personal details
- Born: October 9, 1982 (age 44) Zambia
- Party: Independent (2021 - 2026); Patriotic Front (before 2021)

Binwell Chansa Mpundu (born October 9, 1982) is a Zambian politician and businessman. He was the Kitwe District Commissioner from January 2017 to February 2020. He also served as the Nkana Member of Parliament in the National Assembly of Zambia from 2021 to 2026.
