= Evelyn Hone =

Rhodesian politician (1911-1979)

Sir Evelyn Dennison Hone GCMG, CVO, OBE

Governor of Northern Rhodesia
- In office 22 April 1959 – 24 October 1964
- Preceded by: Sir Arthur Benson
- Succeeded by: Kenneth Kaunda as President of Zambia

Personal details
- Born: Evelyn Dennison Hone; 13 December 1911 Salisbury, Southern Rhodesia
- Died: 18 September 1979 (aged 67) Lusaka, Zambia

Sir Evelyn Dennison Hone GCMG CVO OBE (13 December 1911 – 18 September 1979) was the last Governor of Northern Rhodesia, from 1959 until it gained its independence as Zambia in 1964.

== Early life ==
Hone was born into the Hone family in Salisbury, Southern Rhodesia, on 13 December 1911. He was the son of Arthur Rickman Hone, the Chief Magistrate in Southern Rhodesia, and Olive Gertrude Fairbridge Scanlen, the daughter of Sir Thomas Scanlen. He was the nephew of Rt. Rev. Campbell Hone and the great-grandson of Ven. Richard Hone.

== Career ==
After studying at Oxford University as a Rhodes Scholar, Hone entered the Colonial Service. He served in the Tanganyika Territory, Seychelles, Palestine, British Honduras, and Aden. He was chief secretary to the Governor of Northern Rhodesia from 1957 to 1959, became governor himself in 1959. Quickly beginning talks with African nationalists, he developed a good working relationship with Kenneth Kaunda and helped pave the way for Northern Rhodesia to gain independence as Zambia in October 1964.

The Evelyn Hone College in Lusaka was later named after him. He died in September 1979.
