= Alexander Chiteme =

Zambian politician and businessman (born 1979)

Elected Member of Parliament for Nkana
- In office August 2016 – May 2021
- Preceded by: Luxon Kazabu
- Succeeded by: Binwell Mpundu
- Incumbent
- Assumed office August 2026
- Preceded by: Binwell Mpundu

Minister of National Development Planning
- In office January 2018 – May 2021
- President: Edgar Lungu

Personal details
- Born: October 10, 1979
- Party: • Patriotic Front (2016 - 2026) • National Reconciliation Party for Unity and Prosperity (2026 - Present)

Alexander Chiteme (born October 10, 1979) is a Zambian politician who represented Nkana constituency in the National Assembly from 2016 to 2021. He served as Minister of National Development Planning under President Edgar Lungu from January 2018 to 2021. After losing the Nkana parliamentary seat to Binwell Mpundu in the 2021 general election, Chiteme returned to the National Assembly in 2026 after winning the constituency under the banner of the National Reconciliation Party for Unity and Prosperity (NRPUP).

== Political career ==
Chiteme was elected to the National Assembly of Zambia for Nkana constituency in the 2016 general election as a member of the Patriotic Front (PF). In January 2018, President Edgar Lungu appointed Chiteme as Minister of National Development Planning.

Chiteme sought re-election as the PF candidate for Nkana constituency in the 2021 general election but lost to independent candidate Binwell Mpundu.

Chiteme returned to Parliament at the 2026 general election, winning the Nkana constituency seat under the National Reconciliation Party for Unity and Prosperity (NRPUP). He regained the seat from Binwell Mpundu, who had defeated him in the 2021 general election.
