= Arthur Benson =

British colonial administrator and governor

Sir Arthur Benson
- Born: Arthur Edward Trevor Benson; 21 December 1907; Johannesburg
- Died: 1987 (aged 79); Honiton, Devon, England
- Occupation: Colonial Administrator
- Known for: Governor of Northern Rhodesia

Sir Arthur Edward Trevor Benson GCMG (21 December 1907 – 1987) was a British colonial administrator and governor.

== Early life ==
Benson was born in Johannesburg on 21 December 1907 the son of an Anglican clergyman. Educated at Wolverhampton Grammar School and Exeter College, Oxford he joined the colonial service in 1931.

== Colonial service ==
Benson was sent to Northern Rhodesia as a cadet later moving on to the Secretariat in Lusaka. During the Second World War he returned to London and was attached to the Cabinet Office. After the war he returned to Northern Rhodesia and the Luwingu outstation. In 1948 he became Chief Secretary of the Central African Council and in 1951 he was promoted to Chief Secretary of Nigeria. In 1954 he was appointed Governor of Northern Rhodesia until he retired in 1959.

== Retirement ==
He became a Justice of the Peace in Devon from 1962 to 1966 and he was also elected an Honorary Fellow of Exeter College.

== Family life ==
Benson had married Daphne Mary Joyce Fynn and they had two daughters, he died in Devon on 15 October 1987.

Government offices
Preceded by Sir Gilbert Rennie	Governor of Northern Rhodesia; 1954–1959	Succeeded by Sir Evelyn Dennison Hone
