= Passfield Memorandum =

The Passfeld Passfield Memorandum' was published in 1930 and was named after Sidney Webb, 1st Baron Passfield, who had been appointed as Secretary of State for the Colonies in June 1929 by Ramsay MacDonald in the cabinet of the second Labour government. Passfeld called a Colonial Office Conference in June–July 1930 to discuss general colonial questions including the Colonial Development Fund, communication and transport, trade questions, films and colonial labour reform. As part of the proceedings of the conference, he issued what was officially termed the Memorandum on Native Policy in East Africa, a memorandum which was circulated to colonial governors in the British Empire. This was an emphatic reassertion of the principles of the paramountcy of native interests that had first set out in the Devonshire Declaration of 1923, and in contrast to an attempt to limit the scope of the Devonshire Declaration, it restated the policy of trusteeship, whereby the imperial state would protect the interests of Africans rather than those of European settlers.

Devonshire’s successor as Colonial Secretary between 1924 and 1929 Leo Amery, had sought to qualify this assurance, both during his 1927 tour of Southern Rhodesia, when he suggested that the colony could amalgamate with Northern Rhodesia regardless of the substantial African majority in the later and in a White paper on East Africa in the same year, which gave support to the aspirations of Kenyan settlers to internal self government similar to that in Southern Rhodesia. Passfield stated his intention of re-establishing Devonshire's principle of trusteeship, and rejected settler wishes for self-government in Kenya and Northern Rhodesia.

In Northern Rhodesia, one effect of the Passfield Memorandum was to lessen the support of settlers for self-government as a separate entity in favour of amalgamation with Southern Rhodesia. However, Passfield and his Colonial Office officials would only consider transferring a relatively small area north of the Zambezi which contained the majority of settler farms to Southern Rhodesia.

After the fall of the Labour Government in August 1931, there was no immediate change in the policy stated in the memorandum, but the 1938 report of the Bledisloe Commission recommended closer cooperation the two Rhodesias and Nyasaland possibly leading to future amalgamation or a loser federation. This marked a rejection of Passfield’s policy.

The memorandum also "introduced a new era in colonial labour policy. Trade unions were to be encouraged, even though subject to registration".
