= Thomas Spurgeon Page =

Northern Rhodesian politician

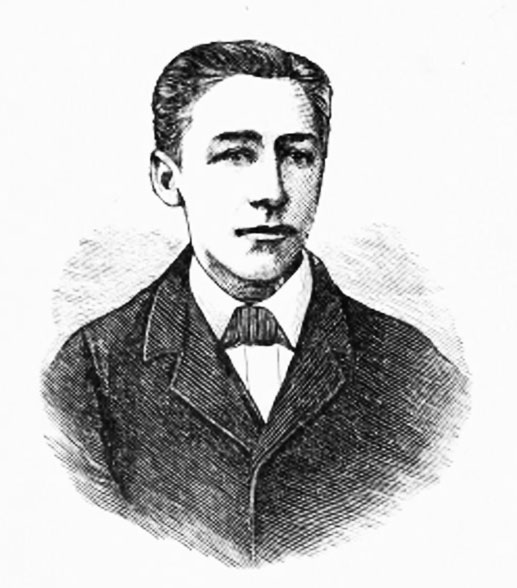

Speaker of the Legislative Council
- In office 1948–1956
- Preceded by: Post created
- Succeeded by: Thomas Williams

Member of the Legislative Council for North-Eastern
- In office 1941–1948
- Preceded by: Seat created
- Succeeded by: Frank Robertson

Member of the Legislative Council for Eastern
- In office 1938–1941
- Preceded by: John Bruce
- Succeeded by: Seat abolished

Personal details
- Born: 19 December 1879 Newington, United Kingdom
- Died: 10 February 1958 (aged 78) Lusaka, Northern Rhodesia

Sir Thomas Spurgeon Page CBE (19 October 1879 – 10 February 1958) was a Northern Rhodesian politician who was a member of the Legislative Council and its first Speaker.

== Biography ==
Page was born in Newington in Surrey to Thomas and Louisa Page; the family initially lived in Croydon, before moving to Sutton. One of six children, he was the only boy, and attended the City of London School. After leaving school at 15, he worked at his father's solicitors offices, before joining a firm that imported German goods as a clerk. After volunteering for a Baptist church in Sutton, he moved to Nyasaland as a missionary in 1899. He was initially based in Cholo, where he was given the nickname 'Chintali' ("the long one") on account of his 6 ft 2 in (1.88 m) height. During his time in Nyasaland he learnt to speak Chewa. Page moved back to England in 1901 after suffering from malaria, but returned to Africa, relocating to Fort Jameson in Northern Rhodesia in 1907 to join his sister Grace and her husband farming cotton and tobacco.

Page married Elsie Harris in Salisbury in Southern Rhodesia on 4 June 1910, having met her in Long Sutton in 1902. The following year the couple created their own farm on virgin land, which was named Kapundi. They went on to have two daughters, born in 1911 and 1913. During World War I he was away from Northern Rhodesia for three years, initially serving with the Nyasaland Volunteer Reserve and stationed near Fort Johnston, before joining the Nyasaland Field Force, in which he became a captain. After the war he was offered a job managing a tobacco farm named Msekera, eight miles from Fort Jameson. In the mid-1920s he began managing a tobacco packing business, where he worked until starting a lorry transport business in 1932, moving goods between Northern Rhodesia and Salisbury. His wife died in February 1935.

In the September 1935 general elections Page contested the Eastern seat, but was defeated by John Bruce. He ran again in the 1938 elections, this time winning the seat and becoming a member of the Legislative Council. In 1939 he bought a cottage on the outskirts of Fort Jameson and became the secretary of the Eastern Tobacco Board and the Farmers' Association, as well as doing bookkeeping. In the 1941 general elections he contested the new seat of North-Eastern and was re-elected unopposed. The following year saw Page appointed Price Controller and Fuel Controller for Northern Rhodesia, holding the former post until 1948 and the latter until 1945. The new jobs required him to move to Lusaka. He remarried in March 1943, taking Edith Mortlock as his wife. He was re-elected to the Legislative Council again in the 1944 elections, defeating Grant Robertson.

Page did not stand in the August 1948 elections, but on 10 November he was appointed the first Speaker of the Legislative Council, replacing the Governor who had previously presided over the legislature. Having already been appointed a CBE in 1947, in 1956 he was knighted in the Birthday Honours for public service. He retired as Speaker in October that year.

He died on 10 February 1958 in Lusaka and was buried in the city three days later.
