= Luanshya (constituency) =

Constituency of the National Assembly of Zambia

Luanshya is a constituency of the National Assembly of Zambia. The constituency covers the eastern part of Luanshya District in Copperbelt Province, including the Luanshya town centre and the towns of Fisenge and Baluba.

The constituency was established in 1941 when Ndola was split into two and originally covered the towns of Luanshya and Mufulira. It was later reconfigured to cover Luanshya and Kansenji and then Luanshya and Kalulushi.

== List of MPs ==
Election year	MP	Party
Luanshya
1941	Michael McGann	Labour Party
1944	James Morris	
1948	Albert Davies	
1954	Rodney Malcomson	Federal Party
1959	Rodney Malcomson	United Federal Party
Luanshya–Kansenji
1962	Cecil Dennistoun Burney	United Federal Party
Luanshya–Kalulushi
1964	Sikota Wina	United National Independence Party
Luanshya
1968	Andrew Mutemba	United National Independence Party
1973	Raphael Chota	United National Independence Party
1978	Raphael Chota	United National Independence Party
1983	Raphael Chota	United National Independence Party
1986 (by-election)	Dickson Kaliyangile	United National Independence Party
1988	Leonard Mpundu	United National Independence Party
1991	Benjamin Mwila	Movement for Multi-Party Democracy
1996	Benjamin Mwila	Movement for Multi-Party Democracy
2001	Roy Chulumanda	Movement for Multi-Party Democracy
2006	Jean Phiri-Njovu	Patriotic Front
2011	Stephen Chungu	Patriotic Front
2016	Stephen Chungu	Patriotic Front
2021	Lusale Simbao	United Party for National Development
2026	Golden Mulenga	National Reconciliation Party for Unity and Prosperity
