= Alexander Williams (colonial administrator) =

British colonial administrator

Sir Alexander Thomas Williams KCMG MBE KStJ (13 July 1903 – 8 January 1984) was a British colonial administrator who spent his career in Northern Rhodesia and the Leeward Islands. He was Governor of the Leeward Islands from 1957 to 1959, the last holder of the post.

== Life ==
The son of John Williams and Mary Williams (née Kennedy), Williams was educated at Bishop Foy School, Waterford, Trinity College Dublin, where he graduated BA, and Downing College, Cambridge. He was posted to Northern Rhodesia as a cadet in 1928, promoted to District Officer there in 1930, Assistant Chief Secretary in 1944, Administrative Secretary in 1944 and from 1947 to 1952, and Chief Secretary and Governor's Deputy from 1952 to 1957.

In 1957, he was appointed Governor of the Leeward Islands, serving until 1959.

Williams was appointed MBE in 1936, CMG in 1950, and promoted to KCMG in 1958. He was also appointed as a KStJ in 1958. He received an LLD jure dignitatis from the University of Dublin in 1957.
