= Nkana (constituency) =

National Assembly constituency in Zambia

Nkana is a constituency of the National Assembly of Zambia. It covers the western part of the city of Kitwe in Kitwe District, including the city centre and the neighbourhood of Nkana.

== History ==
The constituency was established in 1938 and originally covered Kasempa, Mufulira, Mwinilunga, Nkana and Solwezi. In 1941 its borders were redrawn to cover only Chingola and Nkana. In 1948 it was reduced to covering only Kitwe.

== List of MPs ==
Election year	MP	Party
Nkana
1938	Albert Smith	
1941	Martin Visagie	Labour Party
1944	Brian Goodwin	
1948	George L'Ange	
1954	James Botha	Federal Party
1957 (by-election)	Jerry Steyn	United Federal Party
Kitwe West
1959	Jerry Steyn	United Federal Party
1962	Hugh Stanley	United Federal Party
Seat abolished (Kitwe split into Kitwe North and Kitwe South)
1968	Timothy Kankasa	United National Independence Party
Nkana
1973	David Mwila	United National Independence Party
1978	Augustine Nkumbula	United National Independence Party
1983	Wisdom Mvule	United National Independence Party
1988	Noel Mvula	United National Independence Party
1991	Barnabas Bungoni	Movement for Multi-Party Democracy
1992 (by-election)	Matilda Chakulya	Movement for Multi-Party Democracy
1996	Robbie Kasuba	Movement for Multi-Party Democracy
2001	George Chulumanda	Movement for Multi-Party Democracy
2006	Musenge Mwenya	Movement for Multi-Party Democracy
2011	Luxon Kazabu	Patriotic Front
2016	Alexander Chiteme	Patriotic Front
2021	Binwell Mpundu	Independent
2026	Alexander Chiteme	National Reconciliation Party for Unity and Prosperity
