= Hilton Young Commission =

1926 British colonial enquiry

The Hilton Young Commission (complete title: Royal Commission on Indian Currency and Finance) was a Commission of Inquiry appointed in 1926 to look into the possible closer union of the British territories in East and Central Africa. These were individually economically underdeveloped, and it was suggested that some form of association would result both in cost savings and their more rapid development. The Commission recommended an administrative union of the East African mainland territories, possibly to be joined later by the Central African ones. It also proposed that the legislatures of each territory should continue and saw any form of self-government as being a long-term aspiration. It did however reject the possibility of the European minorities in Kenya or Northern Rhodesia establishing political control in those territories, and rejected the claim of Kenyan Asians for the same voting rights as Europeans. Although the commission's recommendations on an administrative union were not followed immediately, closer ties in East Africa were established in the 1940s. However, in Central Africa, its report had the effect of encouraging European settlers to seek closer association with Southern Rhodesia, in what became in 1953 the Federation of Rhodesia and Nyasaland.

== Background to the Commission ==
In 1914, a number of territories on East and Central Africa were under British sovereignty, but they were neither united nor administered in the same way. The East Africa Protectorate, or Kenya, had originally been the subject of a grant to a Chartered company, the Imperial British East Africa Company in 1888, but when the company began to fail it was taken over as a British protectorate in July 1895. Uganda, which had become a British protectorate in 1894. Zanzibar became a British protectorate in 1890, but retained a Sultan as ruler. Nyasaland had been a British protectorate since 1891, but Northern Rhodesia and Southern Rhodesia were administered by another Chartered company, the British South Africa Company, under a Royal Charter dating from 1889.

Germany possessed German East Africa from 1885 to 1918, but after the First World War, Britain received a League of Nations mandate in 1922 over what was renamed Tanganyika Territory. Also in 1922, a referendum was held in Southern Rhodesia in which the white minority electorate chose responsible government as an internally self-governing colony, rather than entry into the Union of South Africa. British South Africa Company rule in Northern Rhodesia ended in 1924, when it became a British protectorate.

These changes resulted in a continuous block of British-controlled territories from the Zambezi northwards in which, following the principles first set out in 1923 by the Duke of Devonshire, who was then Colonial Secretary, the interests of Africans would be treated as paramount. However, the next Conservative Colonial Secretary, Leo Amery later attempted to qualify this principle, and gave tacit encouragement to the aspirations of non-native immigrant communities hoping to obtain a degree of self-government following the model of Southern Rhodesia. In Northern Rhodesia, the tiny white community aimed for a similar constitutional position to that in Southern Rhodesia.

In Kenya Colony, which was formed in 1920 from the former East Africa Protectorate, there was a significant immigrant community from British India, and a smaller Arab one, as well as a European community. From 1905, one Indian was nominated to the Kenya Legislative Council to represent Asian interests. In 1919, when Europeans became able to elect members to the Kenya Legislative Council, Asians were excluded from the franchise. The offer of a second nominated Indian seat on that council was refused in 1920 as unrepresentative of the size and economic strength of the Indian community. In 1927, Indian representation was increased to five members, of whom four were nominated, compared with eleven members elected by Europeans. There was also one nominated Arab member and African interests on the Legislative Council were represented by a single nominated European. Up to twenty official Legislative Council members, all but one European, could outvote the 18 communal representatives. There were then no Africans on the council, and the representatives of both the European and Indian immigrant communities both opposed their admission and any increase in African representation there.

== The Commission's objectives ==
The East and Central Africa territories were individually rather small and economically underdeveloped, so some form of association could result in cost savings. The inter-communal problems in Kenya were also of concern, so in 1927 the Colonial Secretary decided that these matters should be examined.

The Hilton Young Commission on Closer Union of the Dependencies of East and Central Africa, was a Commission of Inquiry appointed in late 1927 by the Colonial Secretary, Leo Amery, and it reported to him in January 1929. Its chairman was Edward Hilton Young, later 1st Baron Kennet, and it included Sir Reginald Mant, a former Financial Secretary to the Government of India, Sir George Ernest Schuster, a barrister and former Financial Secretary to the Government of Sudan, and J. H. Oldham, the Secretary of the International Missionary Council. The terms of reference, in abbreviated form, were:

(1) To make recommendations on whether federation or another form of closer union could lead to more effective co-operation between the different Central and Eastern African governments, in particular on developing transport and communications, customs tariffs and administration, scientific research and defence;

(2) To consider which territories could now or in the future be brought within any closer union, considering the League of Nations Mandate over Tanganyika Territory;

(3) To make recommendations on changes in the powers and composition of the Legislative Councils of these territories:

(a) as the result of forming any Federal Council or other common authority;

(b) to associate the immigrant communities more closely in government; and

(c) to secure more direct representation of native interests;

(4) To suggest how the Dual Policy recommended by the Conference of East African Governors could best be applied in the political as well as the economic sphere.

(5) To make recommendations on what improvements may be required in internal communications between the various territories to facilitate the working of federation or closer union.

(6) To report on the financial aspects of any proposals they may make.

== General recommendations ==
The Commission interpreted its instructions as raising two main questions:

(1) Should there be either federation or a closer form of union between the territories of Eastern and Central Africa to secure more effective co-operation between them? and

(2) What form of constitution is suitable for those territories in which non-native immigrant communities have become permanently domiciled?

It concluded that to achieve effective co-operation, a coherent "native policy" was required. The principles of this policy should be applied uniformly in all the territories, although adapted to different local circumstances. Secondly, the relationship between the indigenous African population and the immigrant communities had to be defined. If those immigrant communities were to be given a political role, they could not be allowed to change the terms of that native policy. Co-operation in transport and communications, customs, defence and research were of much less significance.

The "Dual Policy" referred to in the fourth term of reference was that proposed by Lord Lugard in his book "The Dual Mandate in British Tropical Africa". In colonies where climate and geography precluded extensive European settlement, Lugard suggested that their development must benefit their indigenous population as well as the economic interests of the colonial power. He recognised African interests as paramount, but encouraged settlement by immigrants if their interests did not conflict with those of the indigenous population. In East Africa, particularly in Kenya, the policy was complicated by the existence and political aspirations of both European and Asian settlers. The Commissioners considered that the policy of the British government towards both indigenous and immigrant communities should be agreed by all political parties.

The "Dual Policy" and "native policy" both required the creation and maintenance of resources for African development. The report said that this should be the first duty of the government of each territory: only after this should any surplus be used to promote immigrant enterprises. The commissioners considered that the first requirement was for indigenous communities to have sufficient land to maintain a reasonable living standard using traditional agriculture methods. This land should be reserved for the African population and protected from encroachment by immigrants. They also thought it was necessary to deal with land tenure, and anticipated a change from communal landholding to individual tenure. The commission also considered labour issues, demanding a limit on the recruitment of more than a fixed percentage if workers as migrant labour and insisting on the inspection of work contracts and conditions.

After considering the need to promote African development, the commission reviewed the options for federation or closer union. It rejected any idea of an immediate formal federation in favour of increased regional co-operation. The Report envisaged the creation of a Central Executive Authority who would at first be a High Commissioner relying on existing administrative structures and later a Governor-General supported by an administrative Secretariat. This Central Authority would exercise a more effective supervisory and co-ordinating control on policy matters than was possible from London. The Commissioners emphasised the success of their recommendations depended on the relaxation of Colonial Office control of local legislatures, although Colonial Office officials would still set-out the main lines of policy. They proposed an initial period in which Kenya, Uganda and Tanganyika would co-operate, using the existing East African Governors' Conference (which had been formed in 1926) and its secretariat to advise the Central Authority. In a second stage, representatives from Zanzibar, Nyasaland and Northern Rhodesia would join and the Governor-General's Secretariat would be strengthened. The Commission suggested that the local legislatures would remain and that no central legislature would be created.

== East Africa ==
The Commission considered each East African territory in turn. For Kenya, it argued that there was no immediate possibility of the European minority ever achieving responsible government, but the issue of the political role of the immigrant communities had to be clarified. Hilton Young, in a minority opinion, suggested that responsible government could be achieved with elected European members forming the largest group in the Kenya Legislative Council, with one-third of seats, but this was opposed by the other Commissioners. Uganda presented no major problem and the commission reported that nothing in its proposals conflicted with the League of Nations mandate for Tanganyika, which specifically allowed for an administrative union or federation with neighbouring territories. However, all legislation affecting Tanganyika needed to be scrutinised by the League of Nations Mandates Committee, whether it originated from the Tanganyika legislature or from any new central legislature. The Commissioners noted the differences between Zanzibar and the mainland territories, but also common interests. They suggested that Zanzibar could be associated with any Central Authority, without becoming a full member of any union.

The commission's final problem for East African was of the composition of the Legislative Council in Kenya and of the political claims made by the non-native inhabitants of this Colony. Their difficulty was to reconcile legitimate African political aspirations with the claims of politically minded non-native settlers. It argued that, as the Legislative Council was the principal forum for the discussion of affairs and the place where laws were enacted, it must give to every race and interest a sense that their views were considered and safeguarded. It considered that a common electoral roll was impracticable, and that, as the council was an advisory body, the number of community representatives was unimportant, provided those representatives were of sufficient strength and competence to express the views of their community. The Commission considered an Indian claim for a common electoral franchise in Kenya, based on level of civilisation rather than race or, failing that, an increased representation for the Asian community. It could not recommend a common franchise, but advocated increased Asian representation, and also an increase in nominations to represent African interests, including nominating persons of African descent, probably drawn from native Councils in Kenya.

== Central Africa ==
The commission's terms of reference also covered the possibility of a closer association between Northern Rhodesia and Nyasaland and the territories of East Africa to the north. When Southern Rhodesia received responsible government in 1923, the administration of Northern Rhodesia was transferred from British South Africa Company to the Colonial Office, but both territories retained important links with each other and they faced the same problems of labour procurement and transport costs. The reaction of the settlers in Northern Rhodesia to the possibility of links with East Africa was that they preferred the "white south", which in this case meant Southern Rhodesia, as a partner.

Although the majority of the Hilton Young Commission stressed the connection between Northern Rhodesia and Nyasaland and East Africa, the chairman, Sir Edward Hilton Young, felt that the main economic and political interests of the two territories lay in association with Southern Rhodesia. He stressed the existing transport links between Northern Rhodesia and Southern Rhodesia and the lack of such links between Northern Rhodesia and Nyasaland and East Africa, and the importance of Southern Rhodesia as an employer of workers from the two territories to its north. He was impressed by Southern Rhodesian arguments on a closer relationship with Northern Rhodesia, and proposed a form of closer association in which the Governor of Southern Rhodesia would become High Commissioner for the two northern territories. He also suggested that Northern Rhodesia should be partitioned, with the central, more economically advanced, portion being united with Southern Rhodesia. The majority of the commission rejected both any form of union with Southern Rhodesia and partition. They emphasised the links that Nyasaland in particular had with East Africa and the unsuitability of much of the northern territories for European settlement. They considered that the British government could finance a rail connection from to Northern Rhodesia to Tanganyika, rather than relying on transport links through Southern Rhodesia and its congested port of Beira.

== Subsequent events ==
Despite the recommendation of Hilton Young Commission, that a union of East African territories was desirable, the British government decided against forming an East African union immediately, mainly on cost grounds. However, the progress that had started with the formation of the East African Governors Conference in 1926 continued with the joint East African Income Tax Board and the Joint Economic Council, both in 1940. In 1947 the East African High Commission was established as a joint administrative organisation, along the lines proposed by the commission almost two decades earlier. The British government took no action to build the rail connection from to Northern Rhodesia to Tanganyika envisaged by the commission, and no steps to link the administration of Central Africa to that of East Africa.

The opposition of the British government to the partition of Northern Rhodesia proposed in Sir Edward Hilton Young's minority report and the majority report's promotion of links between Northern Rhodesia and Nyasaland and East Africa led the Southern Rhodesian government to accept that Northern Rhodesia would have to be absorbed as a whole or left as a separate territory. It took comfort from the minority opinion that the main economic and political interests of these two territories lay in association with Southern Rhodesia.

In Northern Rhodesia, the efforts of the Colonial Office to protect and promote African interests were frustrated by the resistance of settler groups. These opposed the government's role in African education and supported the legal exclusion of Africans from many administrative jobs. The principle of the paramountcy of African interests was entirely rejected by the majority of Northern Rhodesian settlers. As the commission's Report appeared to rule out responsible government for Northern Rhodesia by itself, in February 1928, two Northern Rhodesia settler representatives approached the Southern Rhodesian government to discuss terms for amalgamation. The terms offered were generous, including a high level of representation for them in a combined parliament, guaranteed ministerial office in any combined government and other concessions.

In June 1930, the Colonial Secretary of the Labour Government, Lord Passfield, published his Memorandum on native policy in East Africa in June 1930. His statement of colonial policy was an emphatic reassertion of the principle of paramountcy of African interests, and he dismissed settler aspirations of self-government in Kenya and Northern Rhodesia. This had the effect of pushing Northern Rhodesian Europeans towards union with Southern Rhodesia.

== Published sources ==
- Institute of Curriculum Development, (1988). East Africa from 1850 to the Present, Dar es Salaam University Press.
- H. I Wetherell, (1979). Settler Expansionism in Central Africa: The Imperial Response of 1931 and Subsequent Implications, African Affairs, Vol. 78, No. 311.
- R G Gregory, (1971). India and East Africa: a history of race relations within the British Empire, 1890–1939, Oxford, Clarendon Press.
- E A Walter, (1963). The Cambridge History of the British Empire: South Africa, Rhodesia and the High Commission Territories, Cambridge University Press.
- Royal Institute of International Affairs, (1929). The Hilton-Young and Wilson Reports on East Africa Bulletin of International News, Vol. 6, No. 10.
- B. Malinowski, (1929). Report of the Commission on Closer Union of the Dependencies in Eastern and Central Africa, Africa: Journal of the International African Institute Vol. 2, No. 3.
- C Leys and C Pratt, (1960). A New Deal in Central Africa, Praeger.
- B Raftopoulos and A S Mlambo, editors (2009). Becoming Zimbabwe: A History from the Pre-colonial Period to 2008, African Books Collective. ISBN 978-1-779-22083-7.
- I N. Moles, (1961). Race and Politics, The Australian Quarterly, Vol. 33, No. 1
