= Governor of Northern Rhodesia =

Representative of the monarch in Northern Rhodesia

- Flag of the governor of Northern Rhodesia (1939–1964)
- Style: His Excellency The Right Honourable
- Appointer: British monarch
- Formation: 1 April 1924
- First holder: Herbert Stanley
- Final holder: Evelyn Hone
- Abolished: 24 October 1964

The governor of Northern Rhodesia was the representative of the British monarch in the colony of Northern Rhodesia from 1924 to 1964. The governor was appointed by the Crown and acted as the local head of state, receiving instructions from the British government.

== Establishment of the office ==
The office was established on 20 February 1924, when the Northern Rhodesia Order in Council, 1924 was adopted. It provided that "In place of the Administrator for whose appointment provision is made by the Northern Rhodesia Order in Council, 1911, there shall be a Governor and Commander in Chief in and over Northern Rhodesia...".

== List of governors of Northern Rhodesia ==
No.	Portrait	Name (Birth–Death)	Term of office			Monarch	Prime Minister
No.	Portrait	Name (Birth–Death)	Took office	Left office	Time in office	Monarch	Prime Minister
1		Sir Herbert Stanley (1872–1955)	1 April 1924	25 July 1927	3 years, 115 days	George V	Not established
–		Richard Allmond Jeffrey Goode (1873–1953); Acting	25 July 1927	31 August 1927	37 days	George V	Not established
2		Sir James Maxwell (1869–1932)	31 August 1927	1 December 1932	5 years, 92 days	George V	Not established
3		Sir Ronald Storrs (1881–1955)	1 December 1932	7 January 1935	2 years, 37 days	George V	Not established
4		Major Sir Hubert Winthrop Young (1885–1950)	7 January 1935	July 1938	3 years, 175 days	George V Edward VIII; George VI	Not established
5		Sir John Maybin (1889–1941)	1 September 1938	9 April 1941†	2 years, 220 days	George VI	Not established
–		William Marston Logan (1889–1968); Acting	9 April 1941	16 October 1941	190 days	George VI	Not established
6		Sir John Waddington (1890–1957)	16 October 1941	16 October 1947	6 years	George VI	Not established
–		Robert Christopher Stafford Stanley (1899–1981); Acting	16 October 1947	19 February 1948	126 days	George VI	Not established
7		Sir Gilbert Rennie (1895–1981)	19 February 1948	8 March 1954	6 years, 17 days	George VI; Elizabeth II	Not established
8		Alexander Williams (1903–1984)	8 March 1954	25 May 1954	78 days	Elizabeth II	Not established
9		Sir Arthur Benson (1907–1987)	25 May 1954	22 April 1959	4 years, 332 days	Elizabeth II	Not established
10		Sir Evelyn Hone (1911–1979)	22 April 1959	24 October 1964	5 years, 185 days	Elizabeth II	Kenneth Kaunda (22 April – 24 October 1964)

For continuation after independence, see: President of Zambia

== See also ==
- President of Zambia
- Vice President of Zambia
- Prime Minister of Zambia
- Governor-General of the Federation of Rhodesia and Nyasaland
