= Gilbert Rennie =

British colonial administrator

Sir Gilbert McCall Rennie, GBE, KCMG, MC (24 September 1895 – 12 November 1981) was a British colonial administrator. He was Governor of Northern Rhodesia from 1948 to 1954 and High Commissioner of the Federation of Rhodesia and Nyasaland in London from 1954 to 1961. His obituary in The Times described him as "one of the outstanding administrative officers of his generation".

== Life and career ==
The younger son of John Rennie, Gilbert Rennie was educated at Stirling High School and Glasgow University. During the First World War, he saw action with the King's Own Scottish Borderers, reaching the rank of captain and receiving the Military Cross. In 1920, he joined the Ceylon Civil Service, where he gained a reputation for his ability in financial work. In 1937, he was appointed Financial Secretary in the Gold Coast. In 1939, he was appointed Chief Secretary in Kenya, serving until 1947, when he was appointed Governor of Northern Rhodesia. During his governorship took place the negotiations leading to the creation of the Federation of Rhodesia and Nyasaland.

In 1954, Rennie become the Federation of Rhodesia and Nyasaland's first High Commissioner in London, holding the post until 1961. He also served as chairman of the Commonwealth Economic Committee in 1957 and 1958. From 1965 to 1978 he was the chairman of the UK Committee of the Freedom from Hunger Campaign, and from 1965 to 1970 he was joint treasurer of the Royal Society of Arts.

Rennie was appointed a CMG in 1941, made a Knight Bachelor in 1946, advanced as a KCMG in 1949, and appointed a GBE in 1954. He also received an honorary LLD of Glasgow University.

== Family ==
Rennier married Jean Marcella Huggins in 1929; they had two sons and a daughter.

Diplomatic posts
Preceded by Sir Robert Christopher Stafford Stanley (acting)	Governor of Northern Rhodesia; 1948–1954	Succeeded by Sir Alexander Thomas Williams
New title	High Commissioner of the Federation of Rhodesia and Nyasaland to the United Kingdom; 1954–1961	Succeeded by Sir Albert Robinson
