= Northern Rhodesian Labour Party =

Political party in Northern Rhodesia

- Leader: Roy Welensky
- Founded: 1941
- Dissolved: 1944
- Ideology: White minority interests Rhodesian unification

The Northern Rhodesian Labour Party was a political party in Northern Rhodesia. It was founded by Roy Welensky of the Rhodesian Railway Workers' Union originally to support white Rhodesian working class interests but also to support the creation of a federal state with Northern Rhodesia, Southern Rhodesia and Nyasaland. It was dissolved in 1944 after losing the elections that year.

== History ==
The party was established by Roy Welensky in 1941. It was supported by European working class miners and artisans, and campaigned for closer union with Southern Rhodesia. The party was mainly created to protect the white working class from being undermined by cheaper black competition. The first congress of the party was held in Nkana on 11 July 1941, and called for immediate amalgamation with Southern Rhodesia. While this proposal had broad support amongst the white populace in Northern Rhodesia, the black population largely opposed the idea of an amalgamation with Southern Rhodesia due to the latter's harsher restrictions on the native population.

In the 1941 general elections the party contested five of the eight seats, winning them all; Welensky in Broken Hill, F. T. Sinclair in Livingstone and Western, Michael McGann in Luanshya, F S Roberts in Ndola and Martin Visagie in Nkana. However, during World War II there were disputes within the party, mostly due to dissatisfaction with Welensky as a result of allegations that he had schemed to get the Railway Union's secretary deported. The party was dissolved after it was defeated in the 1944 elections, in which only two members retained their seats and one was unseated by an independent Labour candidate in the Copperbelt. Despite its dissolution, the party's policy for a Federation of Rhodesia and Nyasaland became a reality in 1953, with Welensky later becoming the Prime Minister of the Federation of Rhodesia and Nyasaland.
