= Nkana =

Copper mining district in the city of Kitwe, Copperbelt Province, Zambia

Coordinates: 12°50′S 28°12′E

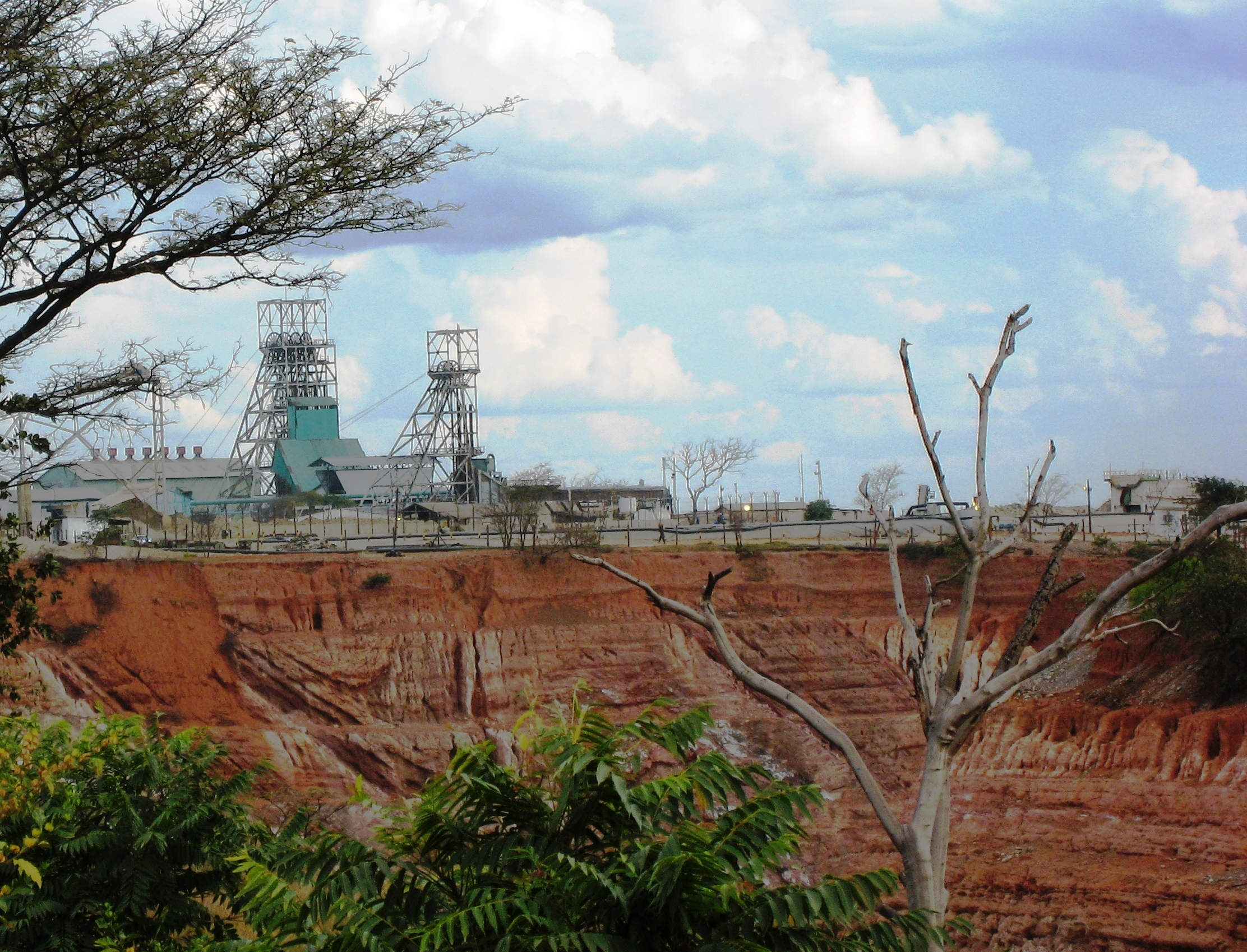
Modern view of headframes and open-cast works at Nkana

Nkana is a section of the city of Kitwe, Copperbelt Province, Zambia which started off in the early part of the 20th century as a railway station to support the growing complex of copper mining operations. It was named after Chief Nkana, the local traditional ruler. The copper mines of Nkana (South Ore Body, Nkana Mine and Mindola Shaft) were originally owned by the Anglo-American Corporation of South Africa. A large smelter was built at the site of the Nkana Mine. The mines in Nkana were among the largest copper mines in the world, employing in excess of 20,000 people. The city of Kitwe grew up as a service town for the Nkana mines but soon swallowed them up, leading to the name Kitwe-Nkana sometimes being used to refer to the city. There are now two suburbs of Kitwe that use the name Nkana, namely Nkana East and Nkana West (both adjacent to the city centre).
