= 1914 Southern Rhodesian Legislative Council election =

The Southern Rhodesia Legislative Council election of 18 March 1914 was the sixth election to the Legislative Council of Southern Rhodesia. The Legislative Council had resolved in 1913 that it should have twelve elected members, together with six members nominated by the British South Africa Company, and the Administrator of Southern Rhodesia. The Resident Commissioner of Southern Rhodesia also sat on the Legislative Council ex officio but without the right to vote. This office was first held by Robert Burns-Begg, from 1 April 1915 by Herbert James Stanley, and from 1 April 1918 by Crawford Douglas Douglas-Jones.

== Franchise ==
In 1912 the franchise arrangements had been altered for the first time since the Legislative Council was established. To be eligible for registration as an elector, the voter had to be a British subject by birth or naturalisation, male, over the age of 21, and to have lived in Southern Rhodesia for six months continuously, as before. Where previously a voter had to be able to sign their name and write their address and occupation, they were now required to be able to complete the registration form in their own handwriting if required, and to write from dictation fifty words in the English language.

The means qualifications were doubled, so that voters had to have either occupied immovable property worth £150 within the electoral district, or have received salary or wages of £100 per annum. As before, ownership of a registered mining claim in Southern Rhodesia also qualified a voter, whether resident or not.

== Boundaries ==
New districts were drawn up for this election by a delimitation board. A policy decision was made that each district should return a single member, and the delimitation board was charged with producing district with an equal number of voters, taking into account community or diversity of interests, means of communication, physical features and sparsity or density of population. The board was permitted to depart by up to 20% from absolute equality, if the board thought fit. In the end, three of the districts were almost entirely urban (Salisbury, Bulawayo North and Bulawayo South) while all the others contained substantial areas of countryside.

== Parties ==
Previous elections to the Legislative Council were contested by individuals standing on their own records. By 1914, although no political parties had been created, the candidates for the Legislative Council were broadly grouped in two camps. The first camp were supporters of the renewal of the Charter from the British South Africa Company and therefore of the present administration of Southern Rhodesia. The second camp favoured moves towards full self-government within the Empire. The election results showed that the supporters of self-government were decisively defeated in every district, although the subsequent byelection in Marandellas did give them a single seat.

== Results ==
Constituency Electorate and turnout	Candidate	Votes
Bulawayo District; 737 (49.9%)	George Mitchell*	194
Bulawayo District; 737 (49.9%)	Charles Spearman Jobling	174
Bulawayo North; 887 (64.0%)	Sir Charles Patrick John Coghlan*	330
Bulawayo North; 887 (64.0%)	Herbert Thomas Longden	239
Bulawayo South; 885 (58.6%) or 887 (58.5%)	Gordon Stewart Drummond Forbes*	275
Bulawayo South; 885 (58.6%) or 887 (58.5%)	Robert Alexander Fletcher	244
Eastern; 785 (73.5%)	Lionel Cripps	317
Eastern; 785 (73.5%)	John Meikle	260
Gwelo; 819	Herman Melville Heyman*	unopposed
Hartley; 871 (52.1%)	Burton Ireland Collings	274
Hartley; 871 (52.1%)	William Muter Leggate	179
Marandellas; 690 (53.0%)	William Napier	185
Marandellas; 690 (53.0%)	John McChlery	181
Northern; 721 (40.9%)	John Arnold Edmonds	204
Northern; 721 (40.9%)	Arthur Lorecht Rubridge Morkel	91
Salisbury District; 842 (59.0%) or 884 (56.2%)	Raleigh Grey*	353
Salisbury District; 842 (59.0%) or 884 (56.2%)	Dominick Eckley McCausland	85
Salisbury District; 842 (59.0%) or 884 (56.2%)	Edward Turner	59
Salisbury Town; 791 (64.7%) or 833 (61.5%)	Milton Evan Cleveland	235
Salisbury Town; 791 (64.7%) or 833 (61.5%)	Frederick Eyles	172
Salisbury Town; 791 (64.7%) or 833 (61.5%)	Harry Bertin	105
Victoria; 743 (65.1%)	Ernest Alban Begbie	280
Victoria; 743 (65.1%)	Howard Unwin Moffat	204
Western; 689 (60.5%)	William Beverley Bucknall	270
Western; 689 (60.5%)	John Reid Rowland	147

* Incumbents

In some cases there were differing figures for the electorate given by the Rhodesia Herald and the Bulawayo Chronicle.

Note: Gordon Stewart Drummond Forbes was absent during the second session; Burton Ireland Collings and William Beverley Bucknall were absent during the third and fourth sessions; and Herman Melville Hayman was absent during the fourth session.

== Changes during the assembly ==
=== Marandellas ===
John McChlery lodged an election petition against the result in Marandellas, and succeeded in establishing that he had actually won. He was declared elected on 5 June 1914.

=== Northern ===
John Arnold Edmonds resigned from the Legislative Council through a letter dated 8 February 1915, and as a result a byelection was held on 26 April. Of the two candidates, Robert Garvin did not definitively state a policy on whether Southern Rhodesia should seek immediate self-government or continue with its present administration, while Frederick Eyles was a supporter of self-government.

Constituency Electorate and turnout	Candidate	Votes
Northern; 721 (35.5%)	Robert George Garvin	171
Northern; 721 (35.5%)	Frederick Eyles	85

=== Bulawayo South District ===
Gordon Forbes died of wounds received in action on 27 July 1915, and a byelection was held on 25 October. George Stewart was a supporter of the 'present administration' while Herbert Longden wanted immediate self-government.

Constituency Electorate and turnout	Candidate	Votes
Bulawayo South	George Stewart	193
Bulawayo South	Herbert Thomas Longden	183

== Nominated members ==
The members nominated by the British South Africa Company were:

- Clarkson Henry Tredgold, Attorney-General
- Dr Eric Arthur Nobbs PhD BSc FHAS, Director of Agriculture
- George Duthie FRSE, Director of Education
- James Hutchison Kennedy, Master of the High Court
- Francis James Newton CVO CMG, Treasurer
- Ernest William Sanders Montagu, Secretary for Mines and Roads

James Donald Mackenzie (Acting Attorney-General) replaced Clarkson Henry Tredgold during his absence, on 4 June 1914 and 8 April 1915. Ernest Charles Baxter (Controller of Customs) temporarily replaced Dr Eric Arthur Nobbs during his absence on 8 April 1915. Percival Donald Leslie Fynn (Acting Treasurer) replaced Francis James Newton temporarily during his absence on 28 April 1916.

George Duthie resigned from the Council in 1916 and was replaced by Ernest Charles Baxter, Controller of Customs and Excise, on 31 March 1916. Baxter was temporarily replaced by Percival Donald Leslie Fynn during his absence on 13 April 1917. James Hutchison Kennedy died in February 1916, and was replaced by George Henry Eyre (Postmaster-General) on 14 April 1916. James Donald Mackenzie as Solicitor General replaced Clarkson Henry Tredgold during his absence on 3 May 1918 and 2 May 1919. When Francis James Newton was absent during the sixth session of the Council in 1919, Percival Donald Leslie Fynn (Acting Treasurer) was named to the council on 25 April 1919.
