= 1908 Southern Rhodesian Legislative Council election =

The Southern Rhodesia Legislative Council election of April 24, 1908 was the fourth election to the Legislative Council of Southern Rhodesia. The Legislative Council had, since 1903, comprised seven members elected by registered voters from four electoral districts; in 1907 the number of members nominated by the British South Africa Company was reduced from seven to five. The Administrator of Southern Rhodesia sat on the Legislative Council ex officio. The Resident Commissioner of Southern Rhodesia, James George Fair, also sat on the Legislative Council ex officio but without the right to vote.

== Results ==
Constituency Electorate and turnout	Candidate	Votes
EASTERN; 491	Francis Rudolph Myburgh*	unopposed
MIDLAND	Herbert Thomas Longden*	198
MIDLAND	Herman Melville Heyman	196
NORTHERN; Two members 1,676 (47.8%)	Raleigh Grey*	449
NORTHERN; Two members 1,676 (47.8%)	William Harvey Brown	412
NORTHERN; Two members 1,676 (47.8%)	John Arnold Edmonds	351
WESTERN; Three members 1,180 (50.9%)	Robert Alexander Fletcher	714
WESTERN; Three members 1,180 (50.9%)	Gordon Stewart Drummond Forbes*	696
WESTERN; Three members 1,180 (50.9%)	Charles Patrick John Coghlan	671
WESTERN; Three members 1,180 (50.9%)	George Mitchell	597

* Incumbents

Note: William Harvey Brown was absent for the third and fourth (extraordinary) sessions of the Legislative Council in 1910 and 1911.

== Nominated members ==
The members nominated by the British South Africa Company were:

- Clarkson Henry Tredgold, Attorney-General
- Edward Ross Townsend, Secretary for Agriculture
- James Hutchison Kennedy, Master of the High Court
- Ernest William Sanders Montagu, Secretary for Mines and Works
- Francis James Newton CMG, Treasurer

During the absence of Clarkson Henry Tredgold from July 3, 1908, Robert McIlwaine (Secretary of the Law Department) stood in for him. Edward Ross Townsend stood down and was replaced by Dr Eric Arthur Nobbs (Director of Agriculture) on April 23, 1909.
