= 1920 Southern Rhodesian Legislative Council election =

Legislative Council elections were held in Southern Rhodesia on 30 April 1920, the seventh elections to the Legislative Council.

== Electoral system ==
The Legislative Council comprised thirteen elected members, together with six members nominated by the British South Africa Company, and the Administrator of Southern Rhodesia. The Resident Commissioner of Southern Rhodesia, Crawford Douglas Douglas-Jones, also sat on the Legislative Council ex officio but without the right to vote.

An important change in the franchise had been made in 1919 through the Women's Enfranchisement Ordinance, which gave the vote to women on the same basis as men. Married women (except those married under a system of polygamy) qualified under the financial and educational status of their husbands, if they did not possess them in their own right. This brought 3,467 new voters to the lists.

New districts were needed for this election under a provision of the 1914 proclamation that had created the 12 separate districts. The proclamation allowed for an automatic increase of one new district for each increase of 792 voters. The required number had been reached in 1917. The boundary changes that followed left the Eastern district untouched, as well as the four districts in the south-west (Bulawayo District, Bulawayo North, Bulawayo South, and Western).

== Parties ==
Previous elections to the Legislative Council were contested by individuals standing on their own records. By 1914, although no political parties had been created, the candidates for the Legislative Council had been broadly grouped in two camps, one favouring renewal of the Charter from the British South Africa Company, and the other moves towards full self-government within the Empire.

By 1920 political parties had been formed, largely around these ideas. The Responsible Government Association, headed by Sir Charles Coghlan, sought a form of administrative autonomy within the Empire. They were in alliance with the Rhodesia Labour Party throughout most of the colony. Ranged against them were the Unionists, who advocated Southern Rhodesia joining the Union of South Africa, and a large number of Independent candidates who were generally in support of continuation of the charter from the British South Africa Company.

== Results ==
Party	Votes	%	Seats
Responsible Government Association	3,245	47.97	9
Unionists	677	10.01	0
RLP–RGA alliance	578	8.54	2
Independent Labour	417	6.16	1
Rhodesia Labour Party	271	4.01	0
Independents	1,577	23.31	1
Appointed and ex officio members			8
Total	6,765	100.00	21
Valid votes	6,765	97.65	
Invalid/blank votes	163	2.35	
Total votes	6,928	100.00	
Registered voters/turnout	11,098	62.43	
Source: Willson

=== By constituency ===
Constituency Electorate and turnout	Candidate	Party	Votes
Bulawayo District; 788 (59.5%)	Lionel Cripps*	Responsible Government Association	276
Bulawayo District; 788 (59.5%)	Sir Philip Bourchier Sherard Wrey	Unionist	193
Bulawayo North; 1,065 (71.1%)	Sir Charles Patrick John Coghlan*	Responsible Government Association	529
Bulawayo North; 1,065 (71.1%)	Charles Spearman Jobling	Independent	228
Bulawayo South; 903 (61.4%)	Francis Leslie Hadfield	Independent Labour	417
Bulawayo South; 903 (61.4%)	Herbert Thomas Longden	Responsible Government Association	137
Eastern; 1,054 (73.6%)	Ethel Tawse Jollie	Responsible Government Association	451
Eastern; 1,054 (73.6%)	William Matthias Longden	Unionist	294
Eastern; 1,054 (73.6%)	Gerald Fitzmassey Dawson	Independent	31
Gwelo; 785 (66.5%)	William James Boggie	Responsible Government Association	332
Gwelo; 785 (66.5%)	St. Charles Boromeo Gwynn	Unionist	190
Hartley; 726 (57.3%)	James Baillie Macdonald	Responsible Government Association	316
Hartley; 726 (57.3%)	Burton Ireland Collings*	Independent	100
Marandellas; 756 (51.6%)	John McChlery*	Responsible Government Association	284
Marandellas; 756 (51.6%)	Thomas Benjamin Hulley	Independent	106
Midlands; 907 (49.7%)	Walter Douglas Douglas-Jones	Rhodesia Labour Party-Responsible Government Association	274
Midlands; 907 (49.7%)	Herbert Walsh	Rhodesia Labour Party	177
Northern; 1,037 (54.5%)	Robert Dunipace Gilchrist	Responsible Government Association	358
Northern; 1,037 (54.5%)	Sir Francis James Newton	Independent	207
Salisbury District; 944 (65.4%)	William Muter Leggate	Responsible Government Association	372
Salisbury District; 944 (65.4%)	Sir Raleigh Grey*	Independent	245
Salisbury Town; 1,163 (66.4%)	John Stewart	Rhodesia Labour Party-Responsible Government Association	304
Salisbury Town; 1,163 (66.4%)	Milton Evan Cleveland*	Independent	258
Salisbury Town; 1,163 (66.4%)	William Streak Honey	Independent	210
Victoria; 998	Howard Unwin Moffat*	Responsible Government Association	Unopposed
Western; 970 (49.1%)	Robert Alexander Fletcher	Independent	192
Western; 970 (49.1%)	Henry Cuthbert Ind	Responsible Government Association	190
Western; 970 (49.1%)	James Grant Riach	Rhodesia Labour Party	94

* Incumbent

== Nominated members ==
The members nominated by the British South Africa Company were:

- James Donald Mackenzie, Attorney-General
- Ernest Charles Baxter, Controller of Customs and Excise
- Dr Eric Arthur Nobbs PhD BSc FHAS, Director of Agriculture
- George Henry Eyre, Postmaster-General
- Sir Ernest William Sanders Montagu, Secretary for Mines and Works
- Percival Donald Leslie Fynn, Treasurer

Robert MacIlwaine, Solicitor-General, was appointed a member to replace Ernest Charles Baxter during Baxter's temporary absence on 6 May 1920. George Henry Eyre stood down and was replaced by Robert MacIlwaine on 25 March 1921.

During a Special Session of the Legislative Council between 3 and 11 October 1923, held to set up the new administration following the award of responsible government, the appointed members were:

- Sir John Robert Chancellor, Governor (sitting in the ex officio seat of the Administrator)
- Percival Donald Leslie Fynn, Treasurer
- Robert James Hudson, Attorney General
- Sir Francis James Newton KCMG CVO, Colonial Secretary
- Eric Arthur Nobbs, Director of Agriculture
- Robert MacIlwaine, Solicitor General
- Dr Andrew Milroy Fleming CMG, Medical Director
