= Robert James Hudson =

Major The Honourable Sir Robert Hudson KCMG MC QC

3rd Chief Justice of Southern Rhodesia
- In office 1943 – 15 May 1950
- Preceded by: Sir Fraser Russell
- Succeeded by: Vernon Lewis

Attorney General of Southern Rhodesia
- In office 1 October 1923 – 5 July 1933
- Premier: Sir Charles Coghlan; Howard Unwin Moffat
- Preceded by: James Donald Mackenzie
- Succeeded by: Himself (Justice and Defence)

Minister of Defence
- In office 1 October 1923 – 5 July 1933
- Premier: Sir Charles Coghlan; Howard Unwin Moffat
- Preceded by: New title
- Succeeded by: Himself (Justice and Defence)

Minister of Justice and Defence
- In office 5 July 1933 – 6 September 1933
- Prime Minister: George Mitchell
- Preceded by: Himself
- Succeeded by: Stephen O'Keeffe

Personal details
- Born: 15 May 1885 Mossel Bay, Cape Colony
- Died: 17 June 1963 (aged 78) Salisbury, Southern Rhodesia
- Party: Rhodesia Party
- Spouses: Constance De Beer (1920–1925); Millicent Bruce (1928–1963)

Major Sir Robert James Hudson, KCMG, MC, QC (15 May 1885 – 17 June 1963), was twice acting Governor of Southern Rhodesia.

== Early life and career ==
Born in Mossel Bay, Cape Colony, the son of George Matthews Hudson, Hudson was educated at Diocesan College, Rondebosch and Gonville and Caius College, Cambridge, where in 1908 he became the first South African to gain a half blue for tennis.

Hudson was called to the Bar Middle Temple in 1909 and moved to Rhodesia to practice as a barrister in Bulawayo.

Following the outbreak of the First World War, Hudson served with the 1st Rhodesia Regiment in Southwest Africa and then moved to England to become a pilot for the Royal Flying Corps and the Royal Air Force. He was awarded a Military Cross in 1917. While in England on active service, Hudson was called upon to give expert advice in a case involving mining in Rhodesia, which was later called "one of the most lengthy and costly court cases of its time."

== Political career ==
Following the war, Hudson returned to Bulawayo and continued to work as a barrister, gaining praise as "the leading advocate in Southern Rhodesia." Following the confirmation of responsible government to Southern Rhodesia in 1923, the colony's first Premier, Sir Charles Coghlan, appointed Hudson as Attorney-General of Southern Rhodesia, an appointment considered "unusual" at the time as Hudson was not a member of Coghlan's Rhodesia Party.

Hudson subsequently joined the Rhodesia Party and successfully stood for the electorate of Bulawayo North in the Southern Rhodesian Legislative Assembly at the 1924 election. Following the election, Hudson was appointed Minister of Justice (as the position of Attorney-General had been renamed) and Minister of Defence.

Re-elected in 1928, Hudson was considered one of the most outstanding members of the first Cabinet."

== Judicial career ==
In 1933, Hudson resigned from the Legislative Assembly to sit on the High Court of Southern Rhodesia and served as resident judge in Bulawayo until 1943, when he was appointed Chief Justice of Southern Rhodesia. While serving as Chief Justice, Hudson twice acted as Governor of Southern Rhodesia; the first from 26 October 1944 to 20 February 1945, and the second from 19 July 1946 to 14 January 1947.

Hudson retired as Chief Justice on 15 May 1950, his 65th birthday. Hudson continued to be involved in public affairs, chairing the Rhodesian Board of the Standard Bank of South Africa from 1957 to 1962, chairing the Federal Broadcasting Service (FBS), as well as serving on numerous other boards and Royal Commissions.

== Awards and recognition ==
Hudson received numerous recognition for his work, being awarded C.M.G. in the 1938 New Year Honours List knighted in 1944 and promoted to K.C.M.G. in 1950. Additionally, on 19 August 1943, it was announced that Hudson was allowed to officially retain the title "Honourable", as he had served more than three years on the Executive Council of Southern Rhodesia.

He was also appointed Grand Commander of the Order of the Phoenix by King Pávlos of the Hellenes in 1950.

== Personal life ==
Hudson married Constance de Beer in 1920. Following her death in 1925, Hudson remarried in 1928 to Millicent Bruce, daughter of George Sutherland. They had a son and a daughter.

Hudson died aged 78 in Salisbury on 17 June 1963, survived by his wife, son and daughter.

Southern Rhodesian Legislative Assembly
New constituency	Member of Parliament for Bulawayo North; 1923–1933; Served alongside: Coghlan/Welsh	Succeeded by John Banks Brady
Political offices
Preceded by James Donald Mackenzie	Attorney General of Southern Rhodesia; 1924 – 1933	Succeeded by Himself as Minister of Justice and Defence
New title	Minister of Defence; 1923 – 1933	Succeeded by Himself as Minister of Justice and Defence
Preceded by Himself as Attorney General; Minister of Defence	Minister of Justice and Defence; 1933	Succeeded by Stephen O'Keeffe as Minister of Justice; Minister of Defence
Legal offices
Preceded by Sir Fraser Russell	Chief Justice of Southern Rhodesia; 1943 – 1950	Succeeded by Vernon Lewis
Government offices
Preceded by Sir Evelyn Baring	Governor of Southern Rhodesia (Acting); 1944 – 1945	Succeeded by Sir Campbell Tait
Preceded by Sir Fraser Russell	Governor of Southern Rhodesia (Acting); 1946 – 1947	Succeeded by Sir John Noble Kennedy
