= Elections in Southern Rhodesia =

Elections in Southern Rhodesia were used from 1899 to 1923 to elect part of the Legislative Council and from 1924 to elect the whole of the Legislative Assembly which governed the colony. Since the granting of self-government in 1923, Southern Rhodesia used the Westminster parliamentary system as its basis of government. The Political party (or alliance) that had most of the seats in the Legislative Assembly became the government. The person in charge of this bloc (the head of government) was the Premier, later renamed Prime Minister, who then chose his cabinet from his elected colleagues.

== Legislative Council ==
Prior to the grant of responsible government, Southern Rhodesia was governed by a Legislative Council from 1899 which consisted of some nominated and some elected members. The nominated members were appointed by the British South Africa Company, and consisted of the executive which ruled the colony; the number of elected members increased throughout the period as the number of white people in the colony increased.

== Legislative Assembly ==
Following the grant of responsible government in 1924, Southern Rhodesia's Parliament was unicameral, consisting of the Legislative Assembly on its own. Once Acts were passed by the Legislative Assembly, they were passed to the Governor to give assent on behalf of the British monarch. The Assembly had 30 seats until the 1961 constitution, when it was increased to 65 (50 constituencies and 15 districts). It was presided over by a Speaker; Southern Rhodesia differed from UK practice in that the Speaker was an ex officio member of the Legislative Assembly.

== Electoral qualifications ==
=== 1899–1923 ===
The colony of Southern Rhodesia took its base law from that of Cape Colony, suitably modified to retain European settler control. The base requirement was that an elector be a British subject, male, aged 21 or over, and able to write their own name and address and sign their name on the registration form. There were then three requirements which qualified voters.

a) Owner of a registered mining claim in Southern Rhodesia. b) Occupier of immovable property valued at £75. c) Receiving in Southern Rhodesia wages or salary of £50 per annum.

Under b) and c), voters must also have had six months residency in Southern Rhodesia.

In 1912, the literacy requirements were raised to require voters to write at dictation 50 words in the English language, if required by the registering officer. The means qualification under b) was raised to £150 and under c) to £100 per annum. Women were enfranchised in 1919, deemed to possess the same means qualification as their husbands.

=== 1923–1961 ===
The same qualifications were continued under responsible government. In 1928, the dictation test was eliminated, and, in 1938, the means qualifications were lifted from pensioners. The means qualifications were not raised until 1951, when the value of property required was increased to £500, and the annual wage requirement to £240.

In 1957, the residential qualification was raised to two years in the Federation of Rhodesia and Nyasaland, and the language requirement was raised to demand the ability to read and comprehend English. The means qualifications were changed to create upper and lower rolls and to allow for educational achievements to count towards means. Property ownership was required to have been held for two years and the mining claim qualification was eliminated.

=== 1961 constitution ===
Following the enactment of the 1961 constitution, there were two voter rolls that were available to voters. The 'A' roll was the more important, with qualification dependent on meeting a financial and educational means test; voters had to be 21 years of age and possess either an annual income of 792 Rhodesian pounds or more or real estate property worth at least 1,650 pounds – this qualification was lowered to 528/1,100 pounds if the voter had completed a primary education, or 330/550 pounds if the voter had completed a four-year secondary education. Appointment to the office of "chieftain" or "headman" by the government gave automatic access to the A roll. Despite a certain flexibility, the vast majority on the A roll were European. The 'B' roll had a lower set of financial and educational qualifications; voters had to be 18 years of age and possess an annual income of 264 pounds or property worth 495 pounds (reduced to 132/275 if the person completed two years of secondary education, 198/385 if the person was 30 years or older, or 132/275 if the person was over 30 years of age and had completed primary education). Ministers of religion as well as Kraal chiefs with a following of at least 20 heads of families automatically gained access to the B roll. The vast majority eligible for the B roll were African, although a few were European. African nationalists rejected the constitution and successfully persuaded most eligible African voters not to register.

Which roll an elector was on affected the value of their vote in a constituencies and districts. Both the rolls voted for each type of seat. For the constituencies, if the B roll total exceeded one-fifth of the total votes, it was devalued to a maximum of one-fifth. In practice, this never happened, due to the African nationalist campaign to boycott elections. For the districts, if the A roll total exceeded one-fifth of the total votes, it was devalued to a maximum of one-fifth. This was always the case.

=== 1970 constitution ===
In the 1970 constitution, the electoral system was changed with the 'B' roll being abolished. Instead, the electorate were segregated by race with European, Asian and mixed citizens meeting certain income and property qualifications – an annual income of 1,800 dollars or more for the past two years or immovable property worth 3,600 dollars or more, with either demand lowered by a third if the person had completed four years of secondary education – voting in 50 constituencies, with Africans meeting lower qualifications – an annual income of 600 dollars or more for the two past years or immovable property worth 1,200 dollars or more, with either demand lowered by a third if the voter had completed two years of secondary education – voting in eight. In addition, there were eight seats elected by an electoral college of African tribal chiefs. Prime Minister Ian Smith justified this setup on the grounds that the vast majority of black Rhodesians had no experience with the democratic system. White Rhodesians feared that rapid transition to majority rule might yield similar hardships to those experienced by the other newly independent African states such as Ghana, Tanzania, Uganda, and Nigeria. Smith proposed a gradual inclusion of Africans, increasing as the African population got to understand the system. This was based on the contributions to the fisc, hence the 50–16 split in the 66-seat chamber, with a new Rhodesian Senate being instated as well. Critics counter that this was simply a strategy to perpetuate European settler rule for as long as possible, and whether this transition would have happened over the next few decades is unclear.

== Elected governments ==
From 1924 to 1933, the Rhodesia Party (a renaming of the 'Responsible Government Association' which had campaigned for the grant of autonomy) dominated the government. In 1933, the Reform Party, a modestly progressive group, won the election, but within a year the more right-wing part of the party including its leader had merged with the Rhodesia Party to create the United Party. This party remained in power until 1962 when it was defeated by the Rhodesian Front.

From the 1965 election up to the end of Rhodesia in 1979, all of the 'A' Roll seats and European seats were won by Rhodesian Front candidates. These wins were clearly the will of the white voters who felt that the Rhodesian Front was the best choice to lead Rhodesia through the difficult years of sanctions and guerilla war. The 'B' Roll seats were held by Tribal Chiefs and independent candidates. These results ensured a Black African being the Leader of the parliamentary opposition.

== Summary of elections ==
=== Administration by the British South Africa Company ===
- 17 April 1899: Election to the 1st Legislative Council.
- 17 March 1902: Election to the 2nd Legislative Council.
  - 22 May 1903: Addition elections to the 2nd Legislative Council.
- 6 March 1905: Election to the 3rd Legislative Council (in fact, all seats were elected unopposed).
- 24 April 1908: Election to the 4th Legislative Council.
- 12 April 1911: Election to the 5th Legislative Council.
- 18 March 1914: Election to the 6th Legislative Council.
- 30 April 1920: Election to the 7th Legislative Council. Responsible Government Association 11 (including 1 joint with Rhodesia Labour Party); Rhodesia Labour Party 1, Independent 1.

=== Responsible Government ===
- 29 April 1924: 1st Legislative Assembly. Rhodesia Party 26, Independents 4.
- 19 September 1928: 2nd Legislative Assembly. Rhodesia Party 22, Progressive Party 4, Rhodesia Labour Party 3, Independent 1.
- 6 September 1933: 3rd Legislative Assembly. Reform Party 16, Rhodesia Party 9, Rhodesia Labour Party 5.
- 7 November 1934: 4th Legislative Assembly. United Party 24, Rhodesia Labour Party 5, Reform Party 1.
- 14 April 1939: 5th Legislative Assembly. United Party 23, Rhodesia Labour Party 7.
- 25 April 1946: 6th Legislative Assembly. United Party 13, Liberal Party 12, Rhodesia Labour Party 3, Southern Rhodesia Labour Party 2.
- 15 September 1948: 7th Legislative Assembly. United Party 24, Liberal Party 5, Rhodesia Labour Party 1.
- 27 January 1953: 8th Legislative Assembly. United Rhodesia Party 26, Independents 2, Independent Labour 1, Independent Rhodesia Party 1.
- 5 June 1958: 9th Legislative Assembly. United Federal Party 17, Dominion Party 13.
- 14 December 1962: 10th Legislative Assembly. Rhodesian Front 35, United Federal Party 29, Independent 1.
- 7 May 1965: 11th Legislative Assembly. Rhodesian Front 50, Rhodesia Party 10, Independent 5.

=== Unilateral Independence ===
- 10 April 1970: 1st House of Assembly. Rhodesian Front 50, Independent 9, Centre Party 7.
- 30 July 1974: 2nd House of Assembly. Rhodesian Front 50, Independent 9, ANC supported Independents 6, Centre Party 1.
- 31 August 1977: 3rd House of Assembly. Rhodesian Front 50, Independent 16.
