= Governor Russell =

Governor Russell may refer to:

- Charles H. Russell (1903–1989), 20th Governor of Nevada
- Daniel Lindsay Russell (1845–1908), 49th Governor of North Carolina
- Donald S. Russell (1906–1998), 107th Governor of South Carolina
- Fraser Russell (1876–1952), Governor of Southern Rhodesia from 1934 to 1935, in 1942, and in 1946
- Lee M. Russell (1875–1943), 40th Governor of Mississippi
- Oliver Russell, 2nd Baron Ampthill (1869–1935), Governor of Madras from 1900 to 1904
- Richard Russell Jr. (1897–1971), 66th Governor of Georgia
- William E. Russell (politician) (1857–1896), 37th Governor of Massachusetts
