= William Henry Milton =

England international rugby union & South Africa cricket player

Sir William Milton

4th Administrator of Southern Rhodesia
- In office 20 December 1901 – 1 November 1914
- Monarchs: Edward VII; George V
- Preceded by: Albert Grey
- Succeeded by: Francis Chaplin

3rd Administrator of Mashonaland
- In office 5 December 1898 – 20 December 1901
- Deputy: Arthur Lawley

Personal details
- Born: 3 December 1854 Little Marlow, Buckinghamshire, England
- Died: 6 March 1930 (aged 75) Cannes, France
- Cricket career

Personal information
- Batting: Right-handed
- Bowling: Right-arm
- Relatives: Jumbo Milton (son)

International information
- National side: South Africa
- Test debut (cap 5): 12 March 1889 v England
- Last Test: 19 March 1892 v England

Domestic team information
- Years: Team
- 1889/90–1890/91: Western Province

Career statistics
Competition	Test	First-class
Matches	3	6
Runs scored	68	152
Batting average	11.33	13.81
100s/50s	0/0	0/0
Top score	21	47
Balls bowled	79	114
Wickets	2	4
Bowling average	24.00	15.75
5 wickets in innings	0	0
10 wickets in match	0	0
Best bowling	1/5	1/5
Catches/stumpings	2/–	5/–
- Source: CricketArchive, 22 January 2011

Sir William Henry Milton (3 December 1854 – 6 March 1930) was the third administrator of Mashonaland, played rugby for England and was South Africa's second Test cricket captain.

Born in Little Marlow, Buckinghamshire, and educated at Marlborough College, Milton played rugby for England in 1874 and 1875. He immigrated to South Africa, arriving in Cape Town in 1878. By the late 1870s, rugby football was very much battling to survive against Winchester College football. Milton joined the Villagers club and preached the cause of rugby, and by the end of that year the football fraternity of Cape Town had all but abandoned the Winchester game in favour of rugby.

He made his Test cricket debut in South Africa's first Test of all, at Port Elizabeth in 1888–89. He was made captain for the Second Test at Cape Town, replacing Owen Dunell, and made his third and final appearance (again at Cape Town) in 1891–92. He played three other first-class games: two for Western Province and one for Cape Town Clubs.

Milton then moved to Mashonaland and under the influence of his friend Cecil John Rhodes was Mashonaland's third Administrator from 24 July 1897 to 24 January 1901. In 1901, it was decided to combine the administration of Mashonaland and Matabeleland that had been separated three years before, and Milton then became the Administrator of the whole of Company rule in Rhodesia. He retired in 1914 at the age of 60. In 1922, the biggest school in Bulawayo at the time was renamed Milton High School in his honour.

He had three sons, Cecil and John, both of whom would play rugby for England, and Noel, who played for Oxford University. He died in Cannes, France, at the age of 75.

Sporting positions
Preceded by Owen Dunell	South African national cricket captain 1888/9-1891/2	Succeeded by Ernest Halliwell
Political offices
Preceded by Albert Grey	Administrator of Southern Rhodesia; 1901–1914	Succeeded by Francis Chaplin
