= George Mitchell (Rhodesian politician) =

The Honourable George Mitchell

3rd Prime Minister of Southern Rhodesia
- In office 5 July 1933 – 12 September 1933
- Monarch: George V
- Governor: Sir Cecil Hunter-Rodwell
- Preceded by: Howard Moffat
- Succeeded by: Godfrey Huggins

Personal details
- Born: 1 April 1867 Ayrshire, United Kingdom
- Died: 4 July 1937 (aged 70) Bulawayo, Southern Rhodesia
- Party: Rhodesia Party

George Mitchell (1 April 1867 – 4 July 1937) served as Prime Minister of Southern Rhodesia from July to September 1933.

== Early life ==
Born in Ayrshire in the south-west of Scotland, he emigrated to South Africa in 1889, and moved to Matabeleland six years later to work as the manager of the Bank of Africa branch in Bulawayo. In 1901 he left the bank to become General Manager of the Rhodesia Exploration and Development Company, which sought to build up property.

== Political career ==
Elected as a Member of the Southern Rhodesian Legislative Council in 1911 for the Western District, in 1918 Mitchell retired from business and thereafter devoted himself to politics where he was a supporter of the Rhodesia Party and of responsible government within the colony of Southern Rhodesia. Re-elected as the member for the Bulawayo District in 1914, he retired from the council in 1920. With the grant of responsible government in 1923, Mitchell stood at the first election to the Southern Rhodesian Legislative Assembly for the seat of Bulawayo South, but was unsuccessful. He stood again at the 1928 election for the seat of Gwanda and was successful. He was appointed to the Government of Southern Rhodesia on 1 November 1930 as Minister of Mines and Public Works. From 19 May 1932, he served as Minister of Mines and Agriculture.

When Howard Moffat resigned in 1933, Mitchell was chosen as the new Premier and chose to change the job title to Prime Minister. His government was a short one, lasting from 5 July 1933 until the Rhodesia Party lost the general election of September 1933, with Mitchell losing his own seat in the process, to the Reform Party led by Godfrey Huggins.

Southern Rhodesian Legislative Council
Preceded by Robert Alexander Fletcher	Member for the Western District; 1911–1914; Served alongside: Coghlan, Forbes	Constituency abolished
New constituency	Member for Bulawayo District; 1914–1920	Succeeded by Lionel Cripps
Southern Rhodesian Legislative Assembly
New constituency	Member of Parliament for Gwanda; 1928–1933	Succeeded by Sir Hugh Grenville Williams
Political offices
Preceded by John Wallace Downie	Minister of Mines and Public Works; 1930–1932	Succeeded by Himself as Minister of Mines and Agriculture
Preceded by Robert Alexander Fletcher as Minister of Agriculture and Lands	Minister of Mines and Agriculture; 1932–1933	Succeeded by Charles Jobling as Minister of Agriculture
Preceded by Himself as Minister of Mines and Public Works	Minister of Mines and Agriculture; 1932–1933	Succeeded by William Sydney Senior as Minister of Mines
Preceded by Howard Moffat as Premier	Prime Minister of Southern Rhodesia; July–September 1933	Succeeded by Godfrey Huggins
Preceded by Howard Moffat	Minister of Native Affairs; July–September 1933	Succeeded by Godfrey Huggins
