= Fraser Russell =

British colonial governor (1876–1952)

Sir Alexander Fraser Russell, KBE (21 October 1876 – 28 March 1952), publicly known as Sir Fraser Russell, was three times acting Governor of Southern Rhodesia as well as its long-serving Chief Justice.

== Early life ==
Born at St Andrew's Church, Somerset Road, Cape Town, to The Reverend J.M. Russell and his wife Nancy, Russell attended Normal College, Merchiston Castle School, Scotland, and the South African College, Cape Town. At the South African College he obtained a double degree in Arts and Science and was awarded the Ebden Scholarship to study overseas for three years. General Jan Smuts had obtained the same scholarship three years previously. He went first to St John's College, Cambridge, where he gained a first class Law Degree in 1900, and secondly to the Middle Temple, London, to study law.

Russell was called to the Middle Temple bar in 1901 and later that same year was admitted to the South African Bar. From 1902 to 1915 he was editor of the Supreme Court Reports of the Cape Colony and Union of South Africa before his elevation to the bench in Southern Rhodesia. Russell married Winifred Robertson in 1904 and together they had two daughters and two sons.

In 1931 Russell was appointed Chief Justice of Southern Rhodesia and, in 1939, President of the Rhodesian Court of Appeal. While serving as Chief Justice, Russell acted as Governor of Southern Rhodesia from 1934–35, 1936–37 and 1942. He was invested as a Knight Commander of the Order of the British Empire (KBE) in the 1943 New Year Honours.

Russell died in 1952 aged 75, survived by his wife, two daughters and a son, with one son killed in action in 1941. Their daughter Ida married the West Indian Test cricket captain, and later teacher and missionary in Africa, Jackie Grant.

Government offices
Preceded by Sir Cecil Hunter-Rodwell	Governor of Southern Rhodesia; 1934-1935 (1st time)	Succeeded by Sir Herbert Stanley
Preceded by Sir Herbert Stanley	Governor of Southern Rhodesia; 1942 (2nd time)	Succeeded by Sir Evelyn Baring
Preceded by Campbell Tait	Governor of Southern Rhodesia; 1946 (3rd time)	Succeeded by Robert James Hudson
