= Drummond Chaplin =

Rhodesian politician (1866–1933)

Sir Drummond Chaplin GBE KCMG
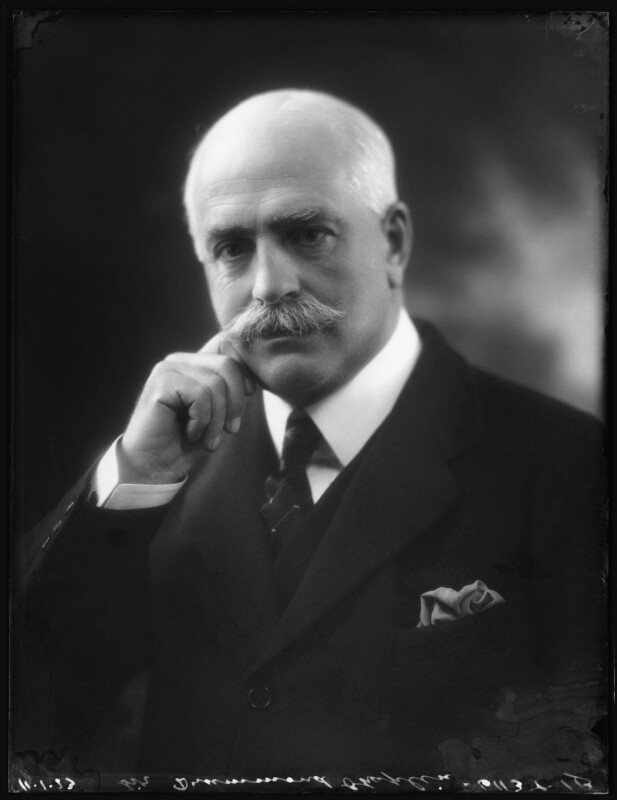
- Chaplin in 1923

5th Administrator of Southern Rhodesia
- In office 1 November 1914 – 1 September 1923
- Monarch: George V
- Preceded by: William Milton
- Succeeded by: Charles Coghlan

Personal details
- Born: 10 August 1866 Twickenham, London, United Kingdom
- Died: 16 November 1933 (aged 67)

Sir Francis Drummond Percy Chaplin (10 August 1866 – 16 November 1933) served as administrator for the British South Africa Company in Southern Rhodesia from 1914 to 1923. He succeeded William Milton.

Chaplin, born in Twickenham in London, United Kingdom, attended Harrow School, and University College, University of Oxford.

Political offices
Preceded by William Milton	Administrator of Southern Rhodesia; 1914–1923	Succeeded by Charles Coghlan; Premier
