= Raleigh Grey =

Sir Raleigh Grey KBE CMG CVO (24 March 1860 – 10 January 1936) was a British coloniser of Southern Rhodesia who played an important part in the early government of the colony.

== Early career ==
Grey, the great-grandson of 1st Earl Grey, was educated at Durham School and Brasenose College, Oxford. In 1881 he joined The Inniskillings (6th Dragoons) and saw service in the Anglo-Zulu War. When the war ended he was in command of the Bechuanaland Border police, and in the Matabeleland rebellion of 1893 he commanded a column of the British army. From 1894 to 1897 his kinsman the 4th Earl Grey was Administrator of Rhodesia, and Grey accompanied Leander Starr Jameson on the Jameson Raid in 1895; in the aftermath of the raid, Grey served five months' imprisonment.

== Southern Rhodesia Colony ==
When Southern Rhodesia was granted a part-elected Legislative Council, Grey was elected at the first election in 1899 to represent Mashonaland. It was subsequently discovered that his supporters had committed bribery and treating of potential voters, and Grey resigned in order to be re-elected free of the taint of electoral corruption.

Following the outbreak of the Second Boer War in late 1899, Grey volunteered for active duty as a special service officer, and left Southampton in the SS Moor in March 1900, arriving in Cape Town the next month. He was promoted to major in March 1901 "for command of mounted troops on the occasion of the capture of Boer guns by Major-General Babington's column". After the war he retired from the Army in 1904, but remained Commandant of the local Volunteers. He established the company Rhodesia Lands, Ltd. to develop mining and farming interests: the 'Jumbo' mine owned by his company became one of the most profitable. He was made a Knight Commander of the Order of the British Empire in 1919.

== Political development ==
In the early 1920s the Southern Rhodesians decided to break away from the sponsorship of the British South Africa Company. The issue among the leading figures of the colony was whether to obtain their own 'Responsible Government' or to seek membership of the Union of South Africa. Grey strongly believed that joining South Africa would be preferable, and argued forcibly for it in the Legislative Council. However the majority there and among the public was against him, and as a result he lost his seat in the 1920 election.

== Later life ==
Grey took this repudiation in good heart but did not participate in politics again, turning his attention to his business interests. In the late 1920s he returned to Britain, and died in a nursing home in London in 1936.
