= First cabinet of Southern Rhodesia =

Government of Southern Rhodesia

- 1st Cabinet of Southern Rhodesia

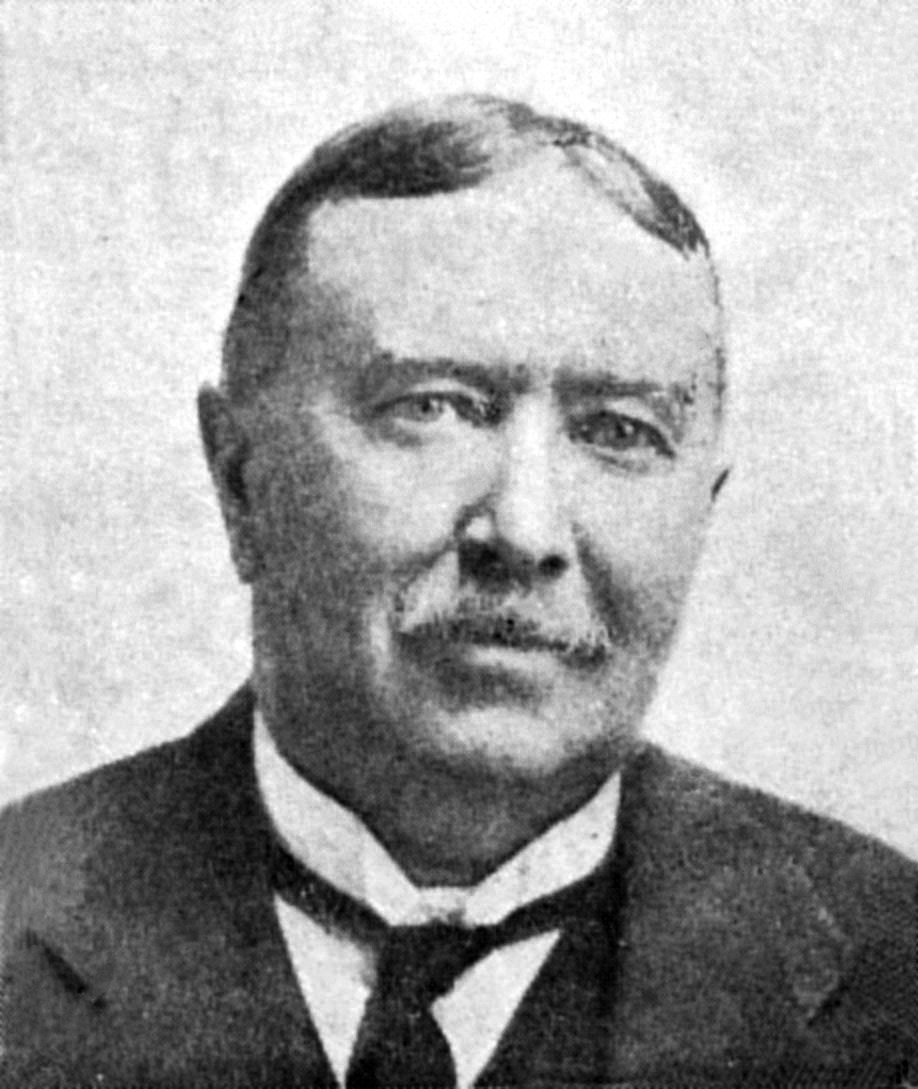
- Date formed: 1923
- Date dissolved: 1924

People and organisations
- Head of state: George V
- Head of government: Sir Charles Coghlan
- Member party: Rhodesia Party

History
- Predecessor: None

On 1 October 1923, Sir Charles Coghlan took charge as the first Premier of the Southern Rhodesia after the referendum in 1922 which decided not to join the Union of South Africa but chose responsible government instead.

== List of ministers ==
Following is a list of the 8 ministers of the First Cabinet

Department	Title of Minister	First Minister (Electoral District)	Senior Permanent Officials
Department of the Premier	Premier	Sir Charles Patrick John Coghlan (Bulawayo North)	Chief of Staff; Secretary to the Premier & Chief Clerk to the Legislative Assembly
Department of Native Affairs	Minister of Native Affairs	Sir Charles Patrick John Coghlan (Bulawayo North)	Chief Native Commissioner
Department of the Colonial Secretary	Colonial Secretary	Sir Francis James Newton (Mazoe)	Secretary to the Department of the Colonial Secretary; Controller of Printing & Stationery
Audit Department	Colonial Secretary	Sir Francis James Newton (Mazoe)	Auditor-General; Assistant Auditor and Inspector; Inspector; Senior Examiner
Department of Health, Education and Internal Affairs	Colonial Secretary	Sir Francis James Newton (Mazoe)	Medical Director; Director of Education
Department of the Treasury	Treasurer	Percival Donald Leslie Fynn (Salisbury North)	Secretary to the Treasury; Commissioner of Taxes; Controller of Customs; Postmaster-General
Department of the Attorney-General	Attorney-General	Major Robert James Hudson (Bulawayo North)	Solicitor-General; Secretary to the Law Department & Legal Adviser; Senior Judge; Judge; Master of the High Court; Commissioner of Police; Registrar of Deeds
Department of Defence	Minister of Defence	Major Robert James Hudson (Bulawayo North)	Secretary to the Department of Defence; Commandant of Southern Rhodesian Forces
Department of Mines and Public Works	Minister of Mines and Public Works	Howard Unwin Moffat (Victoria)	Secretary; Accountant; Inspectors of Mines (2); Mining Commissioners (4); Registrar of Claims; Beacon Inspectors (3)
Public Works Department	Minister of Mines and Public Works	Howard Unwin Moffat (Victoria)	Director of Public Works; Assistant Architect; Assistant Inspectors (2)
Roads Department	Minister of Mines and Public Works	Howard Unwin Moffat (Victoria)	Engineer-in-Charge of Roads; Assistant Road Engineers (2); Assistant Road Engineer and Surveyor
Geological Survey	Minister of Mines and Public Works	Howard Unwin Moffat (Victoria)	Director of Geological Survey; Geologists (2)
Department of Agriculture	Minister of Agriculture and Lands	William Muter Leggate (Northern)	Director of Agriculture; Chief Veterinary Surgeon; Director of Veterinary Research
Department of Lands	Minister of Agriculture and Lands	William Muter Leggate (Northern)	Director of Lands & Surveyor-General

As well as financial matters, the Treasurer ran the postal, telegraph and telephone services, as well as customs and excise. The Attorney-General was responsible for the police and prisons as well as legal and judicial affairs.

Ministers were permitted to prefix their names with "The Honourable".

The High Commissioner retained his nominal authority over Southern Rhodesia, but his powers were mostly devolved upon the Governor in Council.

- Sir Charles Coghlan, Premier and Minister of Native Affairs
- Percival Donald Leslie Fynn, Treasurer
