= Charles Coghlan (politician) =

Rhodesian politician (1863–1927)

The Honourable Sir Charles Coghlan KCMG
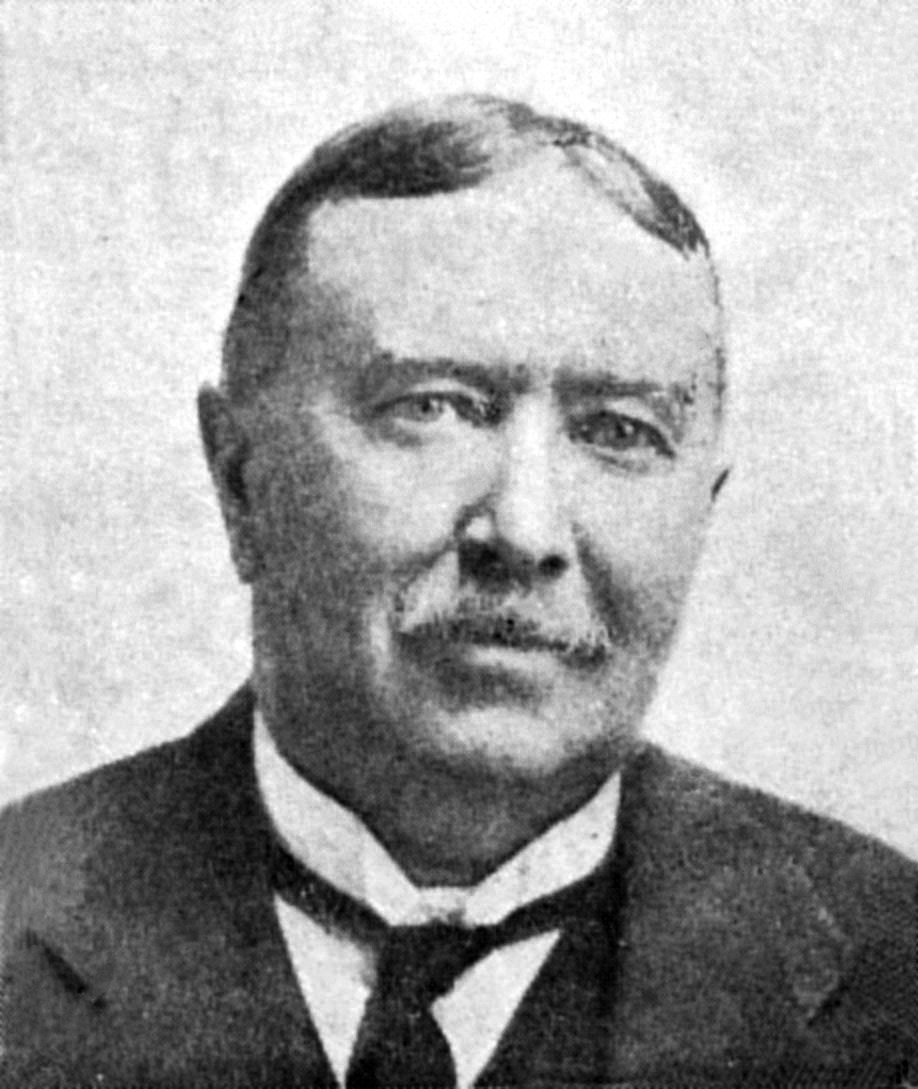
- Coghlan, photographed as Premier c. 1925

1st Premier of Southern Rhodesia
- In office 1 October 1923 – 28 August 1927
- Monarch: George V
- Preceded by: Sir Francis Chaplin (Administrator)
- Succeeded by: Howard Unwin Moffat

Member of Southern Rhodesian Legislative Assembly
- In office 29 April 1924 – 28 August 1927
- Succeeded by: Allan Ross Welsh
- Constituency: Bulawayo North

Member of Southern Rhodesian Legislative Council
- In office 24 April 1908 – 29 April 1924 Serving with: Gordon Stewart Drummond Forbes; Robert Alexander Fletcher
- Preceded by: William Henry Haddon; William Napier
- Constituency: Western

Personal details
- Born: Charles Patrick John Coghlan; 24 June 1863 King William's Town, British Kaffraria (today South Africa)
- Died: 28 August 1927 (aged 64) Salisbury, Southern Rhodesia
- Resting place: Matopos Hills, Rhodesia
- Party: Rhodesia Party
- Spouse: Gertrude Mary Schermbrucker (m. 1899–1927) (his death)
- Children: 2
- Education: South African College, Cape Town
- Profession: Lawyer, politician

Sir Charles Patrick John Coghlan, KCMG (24 June 1863 – 28 August 1927), was a lawyer and politician who served as Premier of Southern Rhodesia from 1 October 1923 to his death on 28 August 1927. Having led the responsible government movement in the territory during the latter days of Company rule, he was Southern Rhodesia's first head of government after it became a self-governing colony within the British Empire.

Born, raised and educated in South Africa, of Irish descent, Coghlan moved to Bulawayo in 1900 to practise as a lawyer. He was elected to the Southern Rhodesian Legislative Council in 1908, representing the Western electoral district. Over the next decade he supported the renewal of the British South Africa Company's royal charter to administer the Rhodesias, and opposed Southern Rhodesia's amalgamation with either Northern Rhodesia or the Union of South Africa. He led a delegation to London to discuss responsible government in 1921, and two years later Southern Rhodesia became a self-governing colony. Coghlan sat in the Legislative Assembly as Member for Bulawayo from 1924 to his death.

Coghlan was buried near Cecil Rhodes's grave, at "World's View" in the Matopos Hills near Bulawayo.

== Early life (1863–1882) ==
Charles Patrick John Coghlan was born on 24 June 1863 in King William's Town, British Kaffraria (part of the Cape Colony from 1866). He had three elder brothers. His father, James Coghlan, was from Ireland and was a Catholic; he had arrived in South Africa in 1851 as a private in the British Army, having enlisted to escape the Great Famine of Ireland. After fighting in the Eighth Xhosa War of 1850–53 with the 2nd (The Queen's Royal) Regiment of Foot, James was stationed in the Keiskamma mountains; he settled there with his wife Isabella Mary (née Maclaren), who was originally from Dunbartonshire, Scotland. They moved to King William's Town after Coghlan's discharge from the military and the birth of their first child, a boy also called James. The elder James Coghlan would become a town councillor in King William's Town.

Charles Coghlan was educated at home until January 1870, when he was enrolled at the Jesuit St Aidan's College in Grahamstown. He was awarded a bursary to the South African College, Cape Town, where he studied law with the intent of becoming a barrister, but these plans were disrupted by his father's death from dysentery. Short of money, Charles quit university in 1882 and went to work for Paley and Coghlan, the law firm where his eldest brother James was a partner, in Kimberley.

== Kimberley (1882–1900) ==
When Coghlan arrived to join his brother in 1882, Kimberley was a town of 22,000 in search of riches, according to John Smith Moffat. That same year, Cecil Rhodes incorporated the De Beers Mining Company and in 1883 was elected to the Cape Parliament as Member for the newly enfranchised Diamond Fields. Kimberley had come into being after diamonds were found on the De Beers brothers' farm on Colesberg Kopje in 1869. Initially dubbed "New Rush", the site was renamed after Lord Kimberley, the British Secretary of State for the Colonies, in 1873. It was respectively 5 miles (8 km) and 40 miles (64 km) from the Orange Free State and the South African Republic (or Transvaal), the latter of which had just had its independence restored following the First Boer War of 1880–81.

Coghlan was admitted to practise as advocate in the courts of West Griqualand on 9 December 1886. Ten months later, after Paley's death, Coghlan and his elder brother formed the firm of Coghlan and Coghlan. Kimberley's position at the epicentre of the diamond trade led the brothers to develop expertise and a formidable reputation for their work in the mining industry.

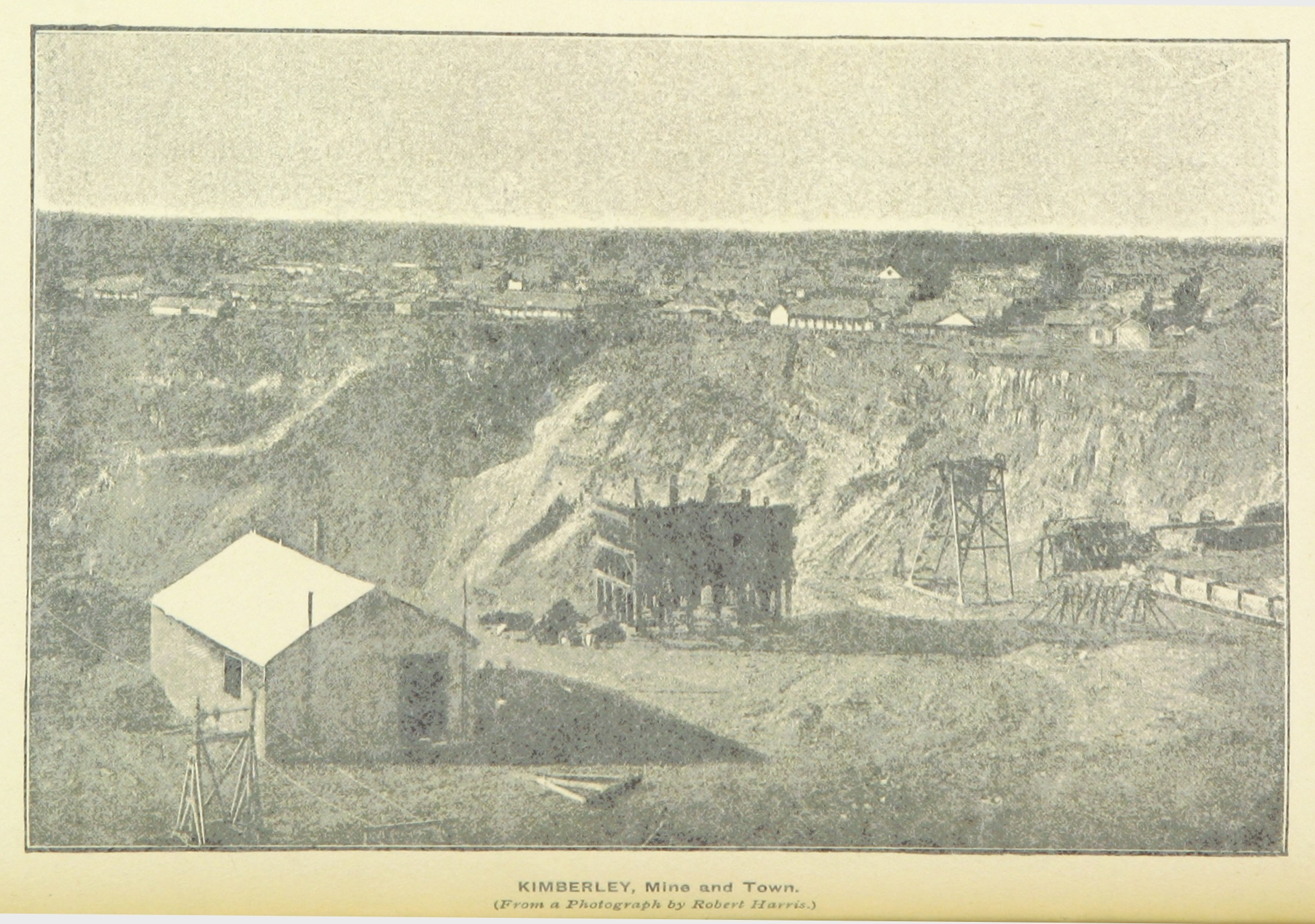
Kimberley Mine and Town, 1891

Rhodes outmanoeuvred his main opponent Barney Barnato and brought all the mines under the control of his company, De Beers, in 1888. On 30 October of that year, through the signing of the Rudd Concession by King Lobengula of Matabeleland, he obtained exclusive mining rights across all of Lobengula's territories in Matabeleland, Mashonaland and beyond for his soon-to-be-formed British South Africa Company (BSAC). Queen Victoria granted the BSAC a royal charter to administer and develop these territories on 29 October 1889, for an initial period of 25 years. This charter included the right to take possession of, deal with, and dispose of land. On 12 September 1890 Rhodes's Pioneer Column reached what was to become Salisbury.

Coghlan took an active part in public debates. He was loyal to Britain, but held that all parts of the British Empire should be internally self-governing, with each territory supporting the others. Arguing that this should extend to his ancestral home of Ireland, he expressed support for the Home Rule movement there. He disapproved of the policy of the South African Republic government under Paul Kruger of conscripting uitlanders (mostly British settlers) for military service while denying them the electoral franchise.

Coghlan was elected to the Kimberley town council in 1897. The following year Colonel Frederick Schermbrucker's youngest daughter Gertrude Mary Schermbrucker, described as an attractive and sociable woman, arrived to stay at the house Coghlan shared with his sister and mother. Coghlan married Gertrude in Wynberg, a southern suburb of Cape Town, on 10 January 1899. Around this time Coghlan's friend Percy Ross Frames invited him to join him in Bulawayo, one of the main settlements in Rhodesia, as Matabeleland, Mashonaland and the adjoining areas were now collectively called. Coghlan was receptive to the idea, but was compelled to stay in Kimberley by the outbreak of the Second Boer War in October 1899. Kimberley was besieged by Boer forces, cut off by rail and telephone, from 14 October until its relief by General John French on 15 February 1900.

== Bulawayo (1900–1908) ==
After a break in Cape Town, Coghlan and his wife left Kimberley for Bulawayo on 30 July 1900. There, they found the conditions to be very basic and the buildings, ramshackle. Nevertheless, the settlers enjoyed outdoor pursuits, dances and musical and theatrical performances. Coghlan and his wife lodged at the Grand Hotel. In 1901, not long after they arrived, the Coghlans' first child was born, but the baby lived only three days. A second child, a girl named Petal, was born in November 1902 and lived to old age.

Coghlan gained admission to the Rhodesian bar and entered into partnership with Frames to create Frames and Coghlan. Frames left for Johannesburg in late 1902, citing the poor economic conditions in Southern Rhodesia following the Second Boer War, ending this firm. Coghlan and Allan Ross Welsh formed a new partnership, Coghlan and Welsh. The firm expanded into Salisbury as Coghlan, Welsh and Tancred in 1907 when Bernard Tancred, a South African cricketer and friend of Coghlan's from Johannesburg, joined. Shortly before the 1908 elections to the Southern Rhodesian Legislative Council, Welsh sent a telegram to Coghlan, who was visiting relatives in Pietersburg, advising him to stand. Coghlan did so successfully in March 1908.

== Towards responsible government (1908–1922) ==
It was widely expected that Southern Rhodesia would eventually be incorporated into the Union of South Africa as its fifth province. It was generally considered part of South Africa geographically and in colonial terms, part of the British expansion into the region that had begun with the 1820 Settlers. Representatives from Rhodesia had participated in the South African National Convention of 1908 and section 150 of the South Africa Act 1909 made specific provision for the accession of BSAC territories. Coghlan had represented the interests of the Rhodesian people at the convention, although his contribution was insignificant. The presence of the Rhodesian delegation had been supported – and even secured – by Louis Botha, who was keen to win the trust of the settlers. In November 1909, at a banquet for Lord Selborne, the departing High Commissioner in Cape Town, Coghlan spoke of the BSAC and the people of Southern Rhodesia working together towards entering the Union, though some settlers wished to enjoy what he called "an artificial stage of responsible government" first. Indeed, the order in council of 1898 had provided Southern Rhodesia with a constitution that resembled that of a Crown Colony with responsible government and the South Africa Act made no changes to the territory's administrative framework.

Botha, who had been asked by the Union's first Governor-General Viscount Gladstone to form a government, began to make policies and speeches that appeared to Coghlan to be unfair to South Africans of British origin. The Attorney-General J. B. M. Hertzog interpreted the convention in a way that Coghlan considered to be to the detriment of English-speakers. Coghlan came to the conclusion in 1910 that Southern Rhodesia's joining the Union was much further off than he had previously thought, though he still saw it as the territory's inevitable destiny, whose timing and terms the local electorate must determine. At this time, he rejected the notion of responsible government—self-government while retaining colonial status—on the grounds that he thought it would take up to two decades to achieve. He was furthermore against the idea of keeping Rhodesia for English-speaking settlers, seeing in that end the same racial discrimination he perceived the Dutch-speakers to be displaying against the British in the Union.

In 1911, the partnership of Coghlan, Welsh and Tancred ended when Tancred died. Around the same time, Coghlan, who was representing a mining company, encountered Ernest Guest in opposition in a case in the court of the Mining Commissioner, who judged in favour of Guest's client. Coghlan, although irritated by Guest, recognised his ability and offered him a partnership, which he accepted, leading to the formation of Coghlan, Welsh and Guest in Salisbury in 1912.

Article 33 of the BSAC charter of 1889 gave the British government the right to alter or repeal any of the administrative provisions of the charter after 25 years. So it was widely anticipated by all sections of southern African political opinion after 1910 that the BSAC's administration would come to an end in 1914. Yet the BSAC remained in place.

During the course of the First World War, Rhodesia's white population was split between the Unionists, for amalgamation into the Union of South Africa, and the Responsible Government Association, for independence. While the RGA was led by Coghlan, the Union Party's leader was Herbert Longden, another lawyer from Bulawayo. Longden, like the British Government, believed Rhodesia lacked the population and resources for an independent state. For Britain, union with South Africa would mean avoiding having to buy out the BSAC, leaving the burden on South Africa instead. After the war, Coghlan noted that the new Secretary of State, Winston Churchill, was determined to achieve the amalgamation of Southern Rhodesia with South Africa. For its part, the BSAC encouraged the Unionists, expecting that it would get a better price for its assets from South Africa than from Southern Rhodesia. Other major corporations were also pro union, since South Africa would be able to provide cheap labour from the south. These interests controlled the local press and were thus highly influential in the debate. With General Smuts, a skillful statesman, also on the side of the Unionists, it seemed unlikely that Coghlan would dissuade the electorate from entering into the Union.

At the 1920 elections, domestic interests aligned against those of the BSAC, rather than unreservedly in favour of responsible government. The run up to the 1922 referendum was long and acrimonious. For the Union were most of the leading citizens of Salisbury and Bulawayo, the British, South African and Rhodesian presses, the BSAC, and the British government. Against them was the Responsible Government Association, founded in 1917 by Ethel Tawse Jollie. Wallis, in his biography of Coghlan, One Man's Hand, gives him the credit for the victory of the responsible government lobby. Lewis Hastings, reviewing Wallis's book, recalls campaigning with Coghlan and says that he was the undisputed leader of the movement—highly competent, with a clear vision, principled and sincere. He attributes Coghlan's resolve to his years in Kimberley, where he experienced the autocratic rule of the De Beers mining company, owned by the BSAC.

By 1922, the display of unity by white farmers against chartered rule at the 1920 elections fell apart. The majority of them, mostly ranchers and tobacco planters, who relied on the southern market, voted for Union. On the other hand, Mashonaland maize growers, wanting to retain full share of the local produce markets, wanted responsible government. The 1922 referendum results were 8,774 for responsible government and 5,989 for joining South Africa. The role of women in the defeat of the Unionists was substantial, with approximately 75% of them voting for responsible government, even when their husbands voted for Union. In a letter to the South African Prime Minister Jan Smuts, the Company Administrator Sir Francis Drummond Chaplin cited anti-Afrikaner sentiments, particularly amongst women, as a major factor in the result.

== Premiership (1923–1927) ==
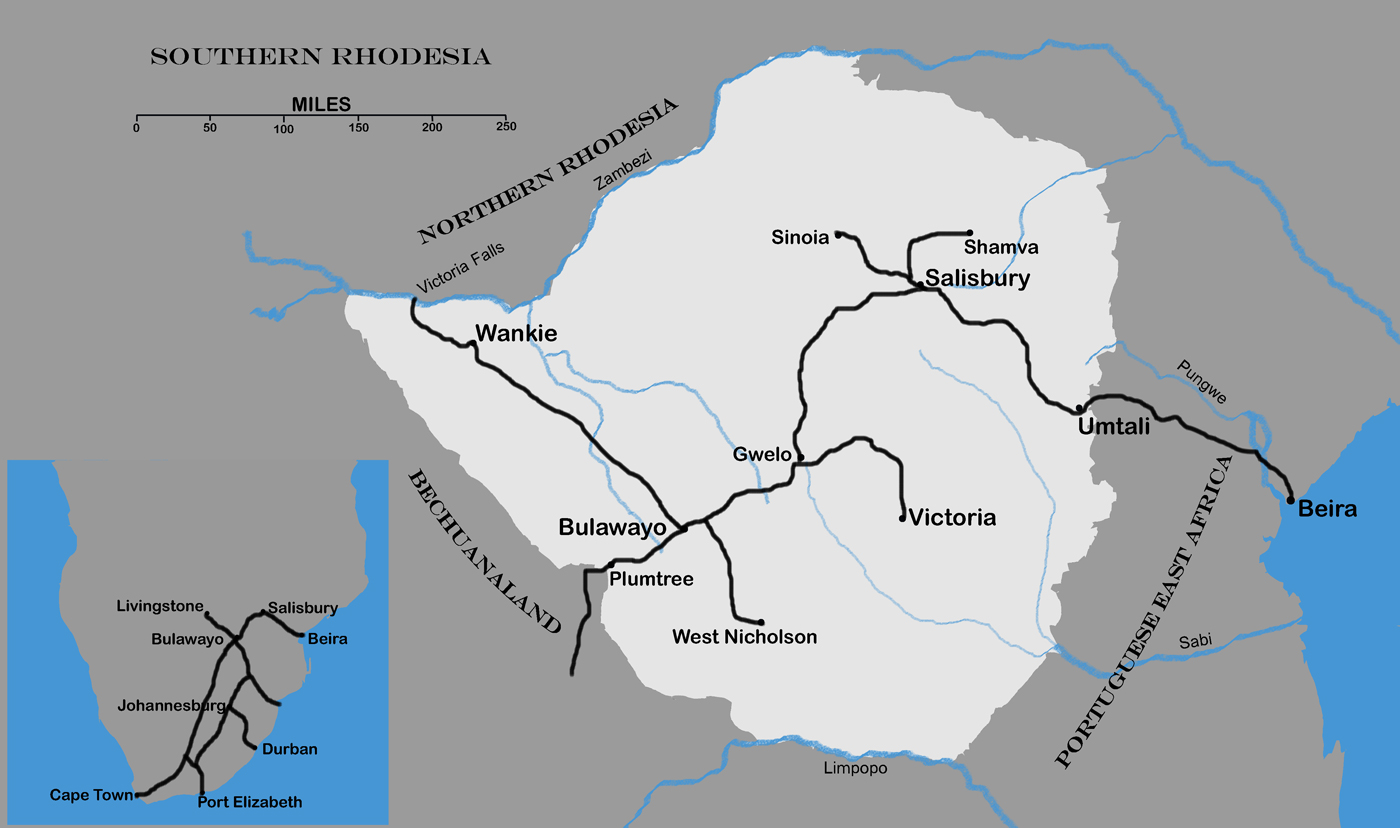
Map of Southern Rhodesia c1927 showing railway lines and rivers.

Before 1923, Coghlan had opposed the amalgamation of Northern and Southern Rhodesia, concerned that it would make responsible government harder to attain. One outcome of the Jameson Raid in 1895–96 had been to prevent the concentration of the BSAC into one administration. Instead, the High Commission in Bechuanaland was maintained, Northern Rhodesia kept its own administration, and Britain oversaw BSAC affairs more closely. One year into his premiership, Coghlan began to consider territorial expansion and staked a claim to northwestern Bechuanaland. The Dominions Office rejected the claim on the grounds that the Union of South Africa would respond with its own claim for the southern half of the territory.

Coghlan directed his attention to Northern Rhodesia. Howard Moffat, his Minister for Mines and Works, had supervised mineral exploration in Northern Rhodesia twenty years earlier and so knew of the rich copper deposits across the Zambezi. However, Moffat's first public claim on the northern territory, in November 1925, was on the issue of control of the railway, which would grant control of the central African cattle trade. At the 1926 Imperial Conference in London, some degree of control over the railway was granted to Southern Rhodesia. There was also the issue of attracting labour for mines and farms from the far north and this gave impetus to Coghlan's and Moffat's territorial expansionism in Northern Rhodesia and Nyasaland. Coghlan called on Britain's Colonial Secretary, Leopold Amery, to give the North entirely to the South or at least the reversionary right to it but Amery refused this request. During his tour of Southern Rhodesia the following year, Amery appeared to give support to its claims to neighbouring territories but by 1928, after Coghlan's death, both the Dominions Office and the Colonial Office were for maintaining Northern Rhodesia's territory intact, and favoured its association with the East African dependencies of Kenya, Tanganyika and Uganda.

== Death and legacy ==
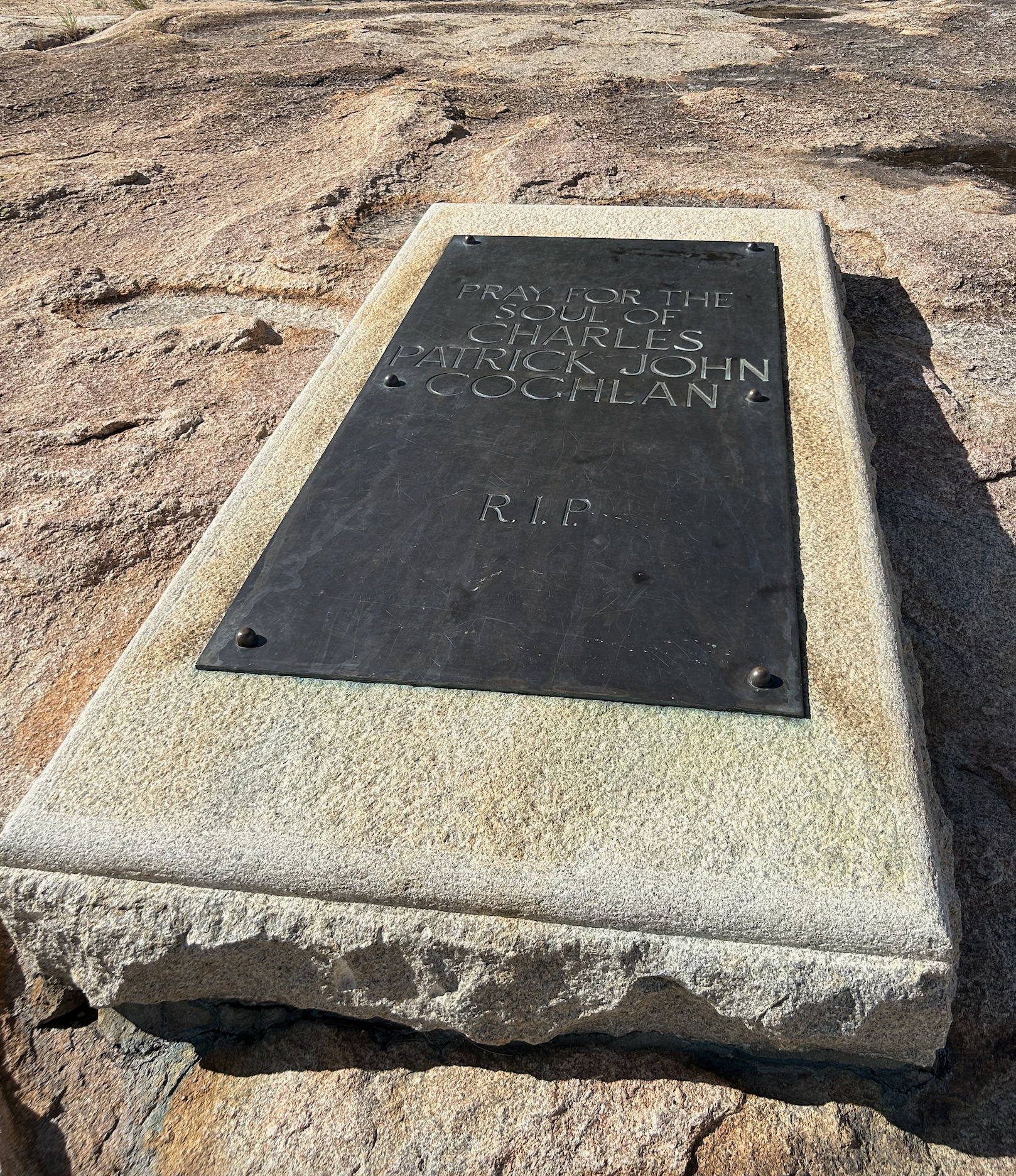
Coghlan's grave is set apart from Rhodes and Jameson's graves, in a part of the rock that was consecrated by a Catholic priest.

Sir Charles Coghlan died on Sunday 28 August 1927, at the age of 64, of a cerebral haemorrhage. A solemn requiem was celebrated for him in Westminster Cathedral. He was initially buried in the Bulawayo cemetery but, following a petition from Bulawayo Town Council, Parliament consented for him to be reburied in the Matopos Hills, alongside Cecil Rhodes and Sir Starr Jameson, at a ceremony on 14 August 1930.

Sir John Chancellor, the first Governor of Southern Rhodesia, after his retirement in 1928 spoke of the progress that the country had made in its first years of responsible government under the stewardship of Sir Charles Coghlan. The country's economy grew, with annual revenue increasing from £1.3 million to £2 million, with exports up from £8.5 million to £12 million, despite setbacks in the cotton and tobacco industries.

The building housing Zimbabwe's Central Intelligence Organization bore the name of Sir Charles. However, in April 1985, it was changed by the office of Prime Minister Robert Mugabe to that of Chaminuka, an ancestral spirit invoked by guerrillas opposing the government of Ian Smith.

== Honours ==
Coghlan was knighted in 1910 for his services to the 1908 National Convention, which led to the South Africa Act 1909 and ultimately the formation of the Union of South Africa.

In 1925, the rank of KCMG was conferred on him, the warrant having been signed by his friend The Earl Buxton, Chancellor of the Order, who had served as Governor-General of South Africa from 1914 to 1920 and was president of the African Society from 1920 to 1933.

Political offices
Preceded by Francis Chaplin (Administrator)	Premier of Southern Rhodesia; 1923–1927	Succeeded by Howard Moffat
