= John McChlery =

Early 20th century Southern Rhodesian politician

John McChlery was a mayor of Bulawayo and later member of the Southern Rhodesian Legislative Council for Marandellas in the early 20th century. Described as having liberal views, he was a member of the Responsible Government Association, and later served on the delegation from the Legislative Council to negotiate with the Colonial Office, prior to the 1922 Southern Rhodesian government referendum.
