= Howard Unwin Moffat =

Rhodesian Prime Minister (1869–1951)

The Honourable Howard Moffat CMG

2nd Premier of Southern Rhodesia
- In office 2 September 1927 – 5 July 1933
- Monarch: George V
- Governor: Sir John Chancellor; Sir Murray Bisset; Sir Cecil Hunter-Rodwell
- Preceded by: Sir Charles Coghlan
- Succeeded by: George Mitchell

Minister of Mines and Public Works
- In office 1 October 1923 – 2 September 1927
- Premier: Sir Charles Coghlan
- Succeeded by: John Wallace Downie

Personal details
- Born: 13 January 1869 Kuruman, Bechuanaland Protectorate
- Died: 19 January 1951 (aged 82)
- Party: Rhodesia Party
- Awards: Order of St Michael and St George CMG

Howard Unwin Moffat (13 January 1869 – 19 January 1951) served as second premier of Southern Rhodesia, from 1927 to 1933.

== Early life ==
Born in the Kuruman mission station in Bechuanaland (now in the Northern Cape province of South Africa), Moffat was the son of the missionary John Smith Moffat and grandson of the missionary Robert Moffat, who was the friend of King Mzilikazi and the father-in-law of David Livingstone. Howard Moffat attended St. Andrew's College, Grahamstown in 1885.

After service in the Bechuanaland Border Police, Moffat moved to Bulawayo and served in the 1893 Matabele War and the Anglo-Boer War.

== Political career ==
He was elected to the Legislative Council in 1923 as member for Victoria and served as Minister of Mines and Works for the First Cabinet of Southern Rhodesia under Charles Coghlan. In the 1927 Birthday Honours Moffat was made a Companion of the Order of St Michael and St George (CMG). He succeeded as premier after Coghlan's death in September 1927.

Moffat was viewed as a conservative who believed that Rhodesia would eventually join the Union of South Africa. He oversaw the purchase, for £2 million, of the British South Africa Company's remaining mineral rights in Southern Rhodesia. His government passed the 1930 Land Apportionment Act, which defined the pattern of land allocation and ownership and is viewed as being one of the ultimate causes of the land disputes during land reform in Zimbabwe from 2000. He resigned in 1933 and was succeeded by George Mitchell. In the 1933 general election he lost his seat. On 6 July 1933 he was granted retention of The Honourable for life.

== Later life ==
In the 1939 general election Moffat attempted to restart the Rhodesia Party but this met with failure.

== Awards ==
- Order of St Michael and St George (Companion) (CMG)

Southern Rhodesian Legislative Council
Preceded by Ernest Alban Begbie	Member for Victoria; 1920–1923	Council abolished
Southern Rhodesian Legislative Assembly
New constituency	Member of Parliament for Victoria; 1923–1933; Served alongside: Robinson (1924–28)	Succeeded by William Winterton
Political offices
New title	Minister of Mines and Public Works; 1923–1927	Succeeded by John Wallace Downie
Preceded by Sir Charles Coghlan	Premier of Southern Rhodesia; 1927–1933	Succeeded by George Mitchell as Prime Minister
Preceded by Sir Charles Coghlan	Minister of Native Affairs; 1927–1933	Succeeded by George Mitchell
