= Administrative posts of the British South Africa Company in Southern Rhodesia =

The British South Africa Company appointed a variety of officials to govern Southern Rhodesia (called Zimbabwe since 1980) between 1890 and 1923. The most prominent of these were the Administrator and the Chief Magistrate, the first of which was in effect the head of government during this time. As such, he held a seat on the Legislative Council of Southern Rhodesia ex officio.

The post of Administrator was officially created by section 8 of the Southern Rhodesia Order in Council of 1894, but in practice had existed as a deputy to the Chief Magistrate, who was the principal officer from 1890. The term of office was theoretically three years, though it was common to reappoint incumbents. There was, in addition, an Acting Administrator, who was a deputy.

The Administrator office became defunct when Southern Rhodesia received responsible government within the British Empire in October 1923. It was replaced by the post of Premier, which was renamed Prime Minister in 1933.

== Chief Magistrates of Southern Rhodesia ==
- 24 July 1891 – 18 September 1891: A. R. Colquhoun (acting)
- 18 September 1891 – 7 October 1893: Dr Leander Starr Jameson KCMG, CB
- 7 October 1893 – 10 September 1894: A. H. F. Duncan (acting)

== Administrators of Southern Rhodesia ==
- 1 October 1890 – 10 September 1894: A. R. Colquhoun
- 10 September 1894 – 2 April 1896: Dr Leander Starr Jameson KCMG, CB
- 2 April 1896 – 5 December 1898: The 4th Earl Grey
- 5 December 1898 – 20 December 1901: William Henry Milton (Administrator of Mashonaland and Senior Administrator of Southern Rhodesia)
- 5 December 1898 – March 1901: Hon. Arthur Lawley (Administrator of Matabeleland)
- 20 December 1901 – 1 November 1914: Sir William Henry Milton KCMG KCVO
- 1 November 1914 – 1 September 1923: Sir Francis Chaplin

== Acting Administrators of Southern Rhodesia ==
- 1894 – 1895: Colonel Francis Rhodes
- 1895 – 1897: Mr Justice Joseph Vintcent
- 1897 – 1898: William Henry Milton
- 1898 – 1899: Hon. Sir Thomas Charles Scanlen
- 1899 – 1902: Hon. Arthur Lawley (Mashonaland)
- 1902 – 1903: John Gilbert Kotzé
- 1903 – 1903: Hon. Sir Thomas Charles Scanlen
- 1903 – 1904: John Gilbert Kotzé
- 1904 – 1909: Hon. Sir Thomas Charles Scanlen
- 1909 – 1914: Francis James Newton
- 1914 – 1923: Sir Clarkson Henry Tredgold, Sir Ernest William Sanders Montagu, and P. D. L. Fynn at various times.

== Resident Commissioner ==
After the Jameson Raid, the British Imperial Government determined by order in council to appoint a Resident Commissioner to supervise the affairs of the British South Africa Company. Reporting to the High Commissioner for Southern Africa, who in turn reported to the Colonial Office in London, the resident commissioner's function was to protect African interests and to prevent the company from inducing another expensive rebellion.

- 5 December 1898 – 1 April 1905: Sir Marshal James Clarke
- 1 April 1905 – 1 April 1908: Richard Chester-Master
- 1 April 1908 – 1 April 1911: James George Fair
- 1 April 1911 – 1 April 1915: Robert Burns-Begg
- 1 April 1915 – 1 April 1918: Herbert James Stanley
- 1 April 1918 – 1 October 1923: Crawford Douglas Douglas-Jones
