= Mashonaland =

Region in northern Zimbabwe

Coordinates: 17°36′S 30°36′E

- Person: MuShona
- People: Mashona
- Language: chiShona
- Country: Mashonaland

Map of Zimbabwe showing Mashonaland

Mashonaland is a region in northeastern Zimbabwe. It is home to nearly half of the population of Zimbabwe. Most of the Mashonaland people are from the Shona nation while the Zezuru and Korekore dialects are most common. Harare is the largest city followed by Chitungwiza.

Currently, Mashonaland is divided into four provinces,

- Mashonaland West
- Mashonaland Central
- Mashonaland East
- Harare

The Zimbabwean capital of Harare, a province unto itself, lies entirely in Mashonaland. It receives moderate amount of rainfall yearly.

== Provincial history ==
It was originally one of the regions that the country was divided into following occupation by the Pioneer Column in 1890. It was designated the extent of territory under administration of the British South Africa Company, as distinct from the remainder of the territory that was directly under the control of the Matabele king, Lobengula, which was named Matabeleland when it was occupied in 1893. The two had separate administrations for part of the BSA Company colonial period.

Revolt broke out against the British South Africa Company in 1896, led by priests of the Mwari religion. The British prevailed, executed some leaders, and tried to reform the system.

In 1923, the territory became part of the self-governing colony of Southern Rhodesia and Mashonaland became one of the five provinces. In 1970, an administrative reform led to Mashonaland being divided into a northern and a southern half. Most recently, in 1983, it was divided into the current three sectors and the capital city of Harare was given its own provincial status as well. Since the constitutional amendments that took effect in 1988, each is run by a governor appointed by the president.

== Demographics ==
Around 7.4 million people live in Mashonaland, around 50% of the population of Zimbabwe. Population growth was higher than in southern Zimbabwe. The most common language used in Mashonaland is Zezuru dialect of Shona followed by Korekore groups.

Province	Population (2022 census)
Mashonaland West	1,893,584
Mashonaland Central	1,384,891
Mashonaland East	1,731,173
Harare	2,427,231
Total	7,436,879

== Geographical features ==
The territory is composed of a broad plateau that slopes gradually to the north and north-west. The lowest land is on its northern border, which is formed by the Zambezi River, with Zambia beyond. A small part straddles the plateau at its south-eastern edge and here the land drains into the Save River. However, the rest of Mashonaland is part of the Zambezi drainage basin. To the south, the Munyati River forms the border with the current and former province of Midlands. The Nyangadzi river forms the border with Manicaland to the east.

Much of the landform is rolling low hills divided by river valleys. About half the land is over 1,200 metres (3,900 ft) altitude and the central watershed in the south and centre is at 1,500–1,650 metres (4,920–5,410 ft). Only a few isolated mountains and the spine of the Umvukwes Range in the west rise higher. The highest point is in the Wedza Mountains in the south east at 1,789 metres (5,869 ft).

== Economy ==
The region's economy consists of the mining, agriculture and the service industry. Its facilities for tourism, fertile lands and mineral filled regions such as Bindura could improve the economy, but due to poor leadership and policies, the economy is lagging behind. Many Mashonaland citizens are farmers, and gain their source of income from agriculture. Mashonaland contributes more than 50% to the Zimbabwean Economy.The region has vast mineral resources including gold, platinum, nickel, chrome, copper and lithium. Main agricultural commodities include maize, potatoes, Tobacco, cotton, citrus, horticulture and beef. The region produces more that 75% of the country's tobacco exports and more that 60% of the country's food. Manufacturing is concentrated in and around Harare and Kadoma the region's third city. Electric power is generated from Kariba South power station with a Capacity of 1050MW and other smaller power plants. The region has huge potential for solar energy. The major airports are RGM international airport in Harare, Charles Prince airport and Kariba airport. Urban centres and growth points are connected by tar paved highways while major towns are also serviced by railway lines.
