= Southern Rhodesia =

British colony in Africa (1923–1980)

- 1923–1965; 1979–1980 (de facto); 1923–1980 (de jure)
- Flag (1924–1964) Coat of arms (1924–1981)
- Anthem: "God Save the King/Queen"
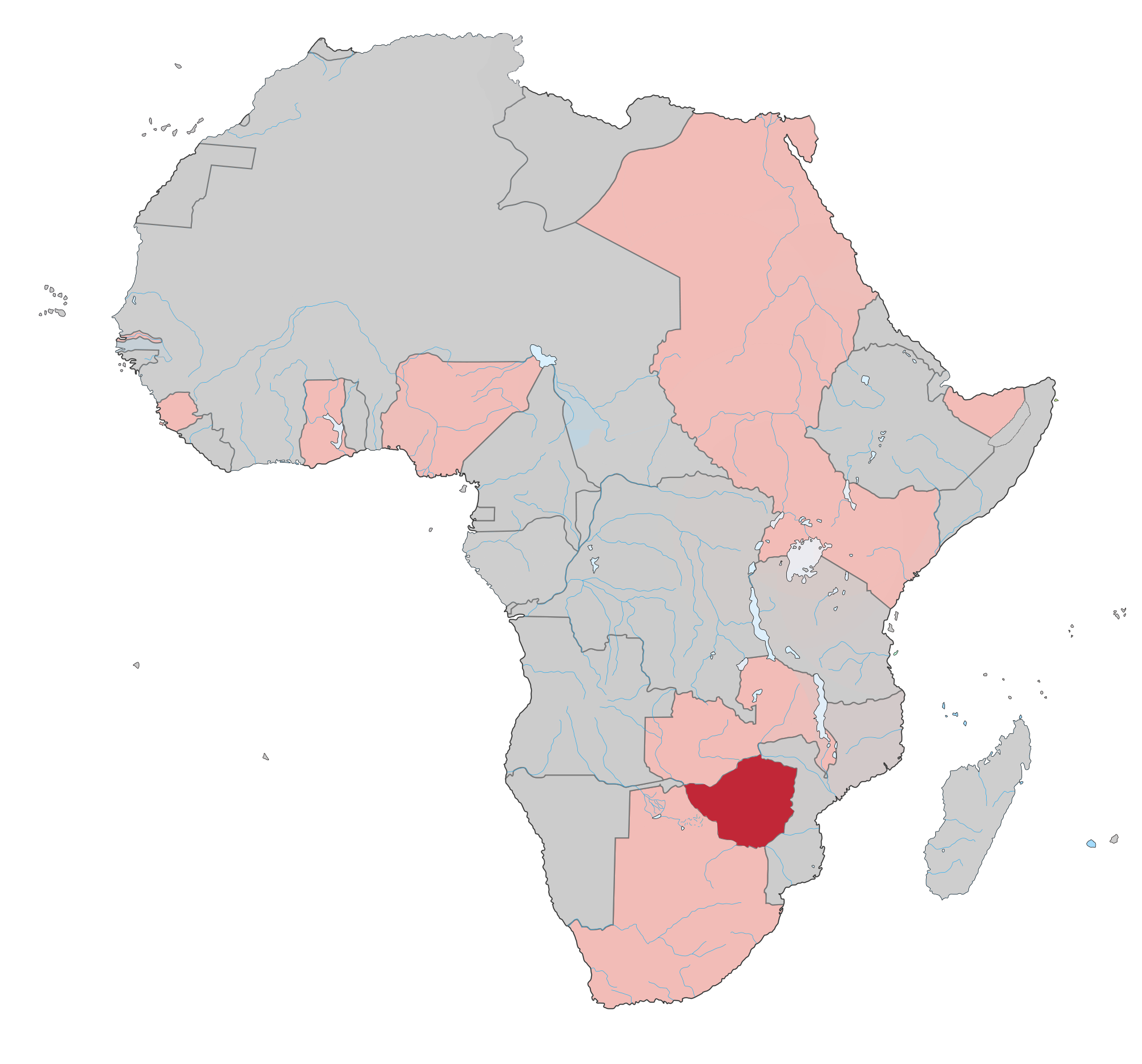
- Southern Rhodesia British colonial empire in Africa prior to World War I
- Status: Self-governing British colony (1923–1965); Crown colony (de facto; 1965–1980)
- Capital: Salisbury
- Common languages: English (official); Shona and Sindebele widely spoken, some Afrikaans
- Government: Constitutional monarchy
- Monarch
  - 1923–1936: George V
  - 1936: Edward VIII
  - 1936–1952: George VI
  - 1952–1964: Elizabeth II
  - 1979–1980: Elizabeth II
- Governor
  - 1923–1928 (first): Sir John Chancellor
  - 1959 (Note: Gibbs' governorship of Southern Rhodesia began during the Federation period. For a brief time, Gibbs was also the Acting Governor-General of the Federation of Rhodesia and Nyasaland.)–1965 (Note: Gibbs' de facto governorship ended with the internationally unrecognised declaration of independence on 11 November 1965, as the attached 1965 Constitution abolished the post and created the positions of Governor-General and Officer Administering the Government (for when a Governor-General was not appointed by the Queen of Rhodesia). On 17 November 1965, his responsibilities were bestowed by the unrecognised government upon Clifford Dupont as Acting Officer Administering the Government. Gibbs remained the de jure legal Governor until 24 June 1969.): Sir Humphrey Gibbs
  - 1979–1980 (last): Lord Soames
- Prime Minister
  - 1923–1927 (first): Sir Charles Coghlan
  - 1964 (Note: Smith continued to lead the unrecognised government as Prime Minister of Rhodesia until 1 June 1979.) (last): Ian Smith
- Legislature: Legislative Assembly
- History
  - Government referendum: 27 October 1922
  - Annexed by the UK: 12 September 1923
  - First responsible government: 1 October 1923
  - Federation: 1953–1963
  - UDI: 11 November 1965
  - Control returned: 11–12 December 1979
  - Lancaster House Agreement: 21 December 1979
  - Independence: 18 April 1980

Area
- 1904: 372,518 km^{2} (143,830 sq mi)

Population
  - 1904: 605,764
- Currency: Southern Rhodesian pound; Rhodesian pound; Rhodesian dollar
Preceded by
| 1923: Company rule in Rhodesia |
| 1963: Federation of Rhodesia and Nyasaland |
| 1979: Zimbabwe Rhodesia |
Succeeded by
| 1953: Federation of Rhodesia and Nyasaland |
| 1964: Rhodesia |
| 1980: Zimbabwe |
- Today part of: Zimbabwe

Southern Rhodesia was a landlocked, self-governing colony of the British Empire in what is today the country of Zimbabwe. The colony's territory was initially conquered and administered by the British South Africa Company (BSAC), which was founded in 1888 by Cecil Rhodes for the purpose of occupying and settling the region. Following years of growing white immigration into the region, in 1922 the settler minority voted to reject entering into a union with South Africa in favour of establishing a settler-run legislative assembly under the framework of responsible government.

The colony's economy declined significantly during the Great Depression and it experienced a high degree of white settler emigration and turnover. In the Second World War, Southern Rhodesian colonial forces actively participated and the war caused an economic boom. Following the war, the colony experienced a large population boom as many whites began to immigrate to the colony. Southern Rhodesian politics were racially dominated by the white minority who restricted the right to vote based on a person's income or ownership of property. The settler-controlled government also passed racially discriminatory land-ownership restrictions, banned Africans from higher levels in the civil service for most of its history, and implemented an extensive racial pass system that limited Africans' ability to live and work in most of the colony.

In 1953, Southern Rhodesia entered into a union with the protectorates of Northern Rhodesia and Nyasaland to form the Federation of Rhodesia and Nyasaland, which dissolved in 1963 due to internal tension. In 1962, the right-wing Rhodesian Front party won the Southern Rhodesian general election. In 1965, the South Rhodesian government under Prime Minister Ian Smith issued a Unilateral Declaration of Independence and oversaw the escalating Rhodesian Bush War between the white minority–controlled government and African nationalist forces.

Following the collapse of white-minority rule and the signing of the Lancaster House Agreement, British rule was briefly reinstated in December 1979 until it was granted full independence as the Republic of Zimbabwe in April 1980.

== History ==
=== Under the British South Africa Company (1889–1923) ===
In late 1889, the United Kingdom granted the British South Africa Company a Royal Charter authorizing the company to acquire, administer, and develop territory "north of British Bechuanaland and to the north and west of the South African Republic and to the west of the Portuguese Dominions." At the time, the region was recognized by the British to be under the nominal authority of King Lobengula, the leader of the Ndebele kingdom which controlled Matabeleland and the British forbid the company from taking any actions in his domain without his prior authorization and consent. Following the acquisition of the Rudd Concession from Lobengula in 1888, Rhodes quickly set to work on establishing a presence in the region. In 1890, the first company-backed expedition was launched when the Pioneer Column set out from South Africa and established Fort Salisbury (now Harare) in Mashonaland and began to develop it as the central hub for the administration of company-held territory.

In 1893, relations between the company and the Ndebele broke down following an Ndebele raid and the beginning of the First Matabele War. The war led to the decisive defeat of the Ndebele, the death of the Lobengula, and the conquest and expansion of Company operations into Matabeleland. In 1895, the company unsuccessfully attempted to stage a coup in the neighbouring Transvaal Republic with the hope of seizing the territory on behalf of Britain. Company forces, led by the chief administrator Starr Jameson, planned to link up with British workers to overthrow the Transvaal government and request aid, at which point Company forces would link up and intervene to assist the rebels. However, the raid was a complete failure. The Transvaal government reacted quickly to the news of a hostile force entering their territory and managed to surround and capture Jameson's force. The raid was a serious diplomatic embarrassment for Britain, causing long-lasting damages to their relations with the Afrikaners, and nearly resulted in the company charter being revoked.

The capture of nearly the entire British South Africa Police force left the British South Africa Company with almost no men in the region to defend itself. The Ndebele, sensing the vulnerability of the company and a chance to drive out the newly established white presence in the region, rose up in revolt against the company and began launching attacks against undefended white properties and killing the colonists, beginning the Second Matabele War. Taken by surprise and completely unprepared, many white settlers were killed in the initial fighting and it was only with the arrival of reinforcements from South Africa that the war turned in favour of the settlers, though it would still take another year of fighting to pacify the territory. The British blamed the British South Africa Company for its recklessness during the Jameson raid and their treatment of the Africans as the principal causes of the uprising and began to take steps to curtail some of the company's authority to prevent them from happening again.

The reforms that followed began the slow transition away from Company rule towards settler control of government. In 1898, the name "Southern Rhodesia" became the official name for the colony following the promulgation of the Southern Rhodesia Order In Council on 20 October 1898. That same year a legislative council was created to manage civil affairs and to pass legislation. At first the Company held a fixed majority of the seats on the council with the minority of the seats being elected by the settlers, but over time the number of elected seats would expand and elected seats would outnumber unelected seats and expand with the growing population. Qualifications to vote for council members were nominally race-neutral, requiring that would-be voters either own greater than £75 in property or a registered mining claim in an electoral district, or have a salary over at least £50 per annum. In practice the restrictions excluded virtually all Africans from being able to vote, with the number of Africans registered to vote only reaching roughly fifty individuals by 1904. Opinion in the United Kingdom and South Africa favoured incorporation of Southern Rhodesia into the Union of South Africa but when given the choice, the Southern Rhodesian electorate voted in favour of greater autonomy in the form of a responsible government in a 1922 referendum.

=== Autonomous self-governance (1923–1953) ===
In view of the outcome of the referendum, the territory was annexed by the United Kingdom on 12 September 1923. Shortly after annexation, on 1 October 1923, the first constitution for the colony came into force. Under this constitution Sir Charles Coghlan became the first Premier of First Cabinet of Southern Rhodesia and upon his death in 1927 he was succeeded by Howard Unwin Moffat.

During World War II, Southern Rhodesian military units participated on the side of the United Kingdom. Southern Rhodesian support for the Allied war effort was based on a mixture shared kinship and identity with Britain and support for democracy. Southern Rhodesian forces were involved in East African, North African, Italy, and Burma campaigns and participated in the Battle of Madagascar. Southern Rhodesian suffered the highest loss ratio in the British Empire forces during World War II. Additionally, the Rhodesian pilots earned the highest number of decorations and ace appellations of any group within the empire. This resulted in the royal family paying an unusual state visit to the colony at the end of the war to thank the Rhodesian people.

Economically, Southern Rhodesia developed an economy that was narrowly based on production of a few primary products, notably chrome and tobacco. It was therefore vulnerable to the economic cycle. The deep recession of the 1930s gave way to a post-war boom. This boom prompted the immigration of about 200,000 white settlers between 1945 and 1970, taking the white population up to 307,000. A large number of these immigrants were of British working-class origin.

In the 1940s, the founding of a university to serve central African countries was proposed. Such a university was eventually established in Salisbury with funding provided by both the British and Southern Rhodesian governments and private sources. One condition of British funding was that student admission should be based on "academic achievement and good character" with no racial distinction. University College of Rhodesia (UCR) received its first intake of students in 1952. Until 1971 it awarded degrees of the Universities of London and Birmingham. In 1971 UCR became the University of Rhodesia and began awarding its own degrees. In 1980 it was renamed the University of Zimbabwe.

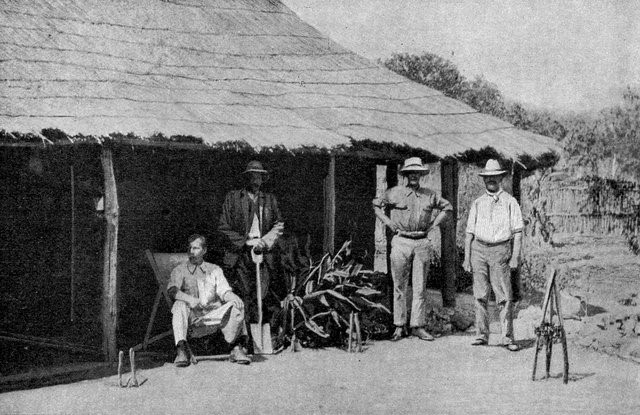
White settlers in Southern Rhodesia, 1922

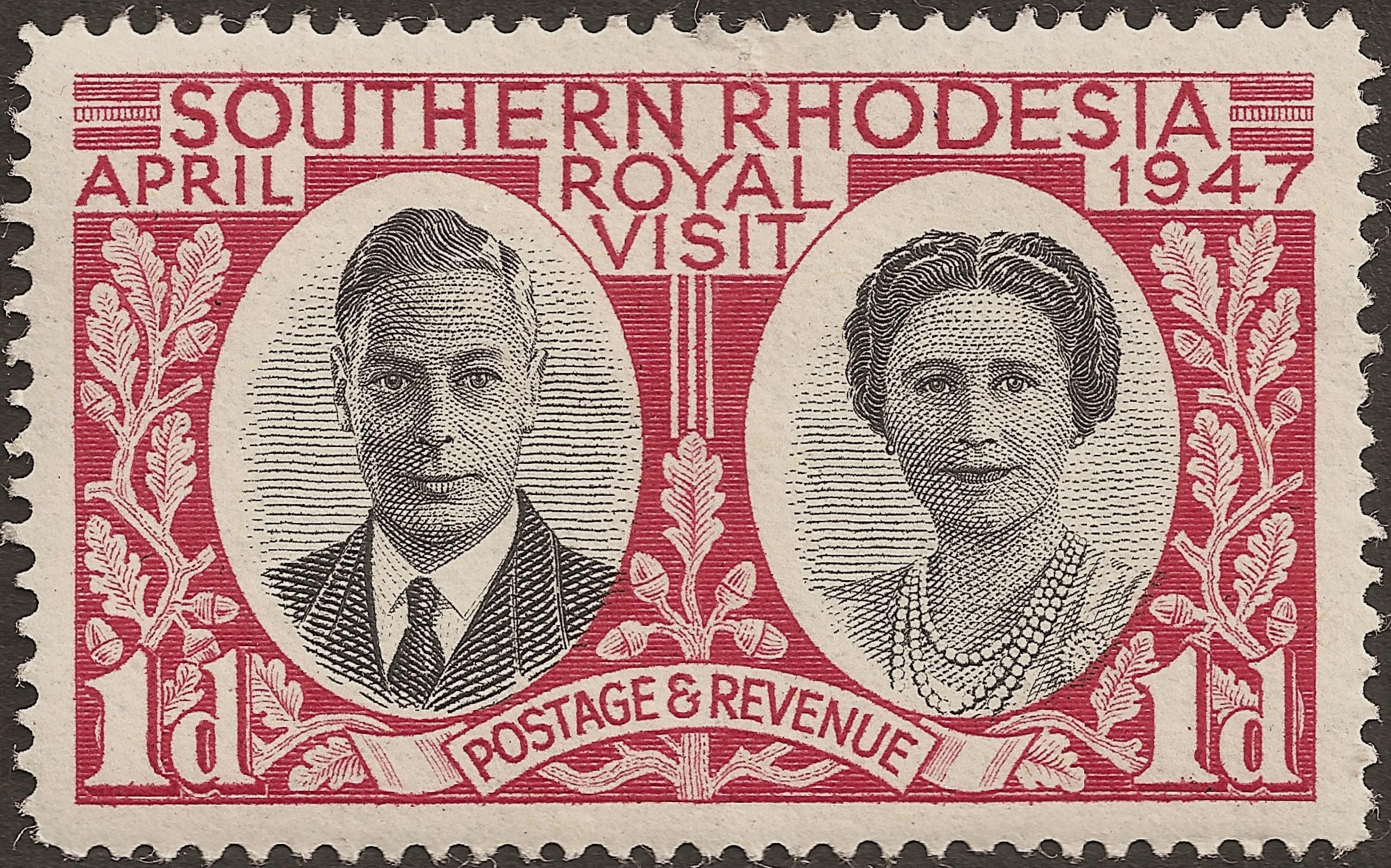
A postage stamp commemorating the royal visit of 1947

=== Federation of Rhodesia and Nyasaland (1953–1963) ===
In 1953, the United Kingdom united the colony of Southern Rhodesia and the protectorates of Northern Rhodesia (Zambia) and Nyasaland (Malawi) into the Federation of Rhodesia and Nyasaland. The intention behind the creation of the federation was to replicate the model that the British had implemented in Dominion of Canada, Australia, and South Africa to turn several independently unviable colonies into a single viable state and to create a bloc that could manage the differing aspirations of the growing African nationalists movements in each territory, and hopefully temper the influence of South African apartheid that was growing in Southern Rhodesia. Northern Rhodesia was the wealthiest of the three member states (due to its vast copper mines) and had contributed more to the overall building of infrastructure than the other two members did. Southern Rhodesia, recognising an inevitable dissolution of the Federation, was quick to use federal funds in building its infrastructure ahead of the others. A key component of this was the building of the Kariba Dam and its hydroelectric facility (shafts, control centre, etc.), which was situated on the Southern Rhodesian side of the Zambezi Gorge.

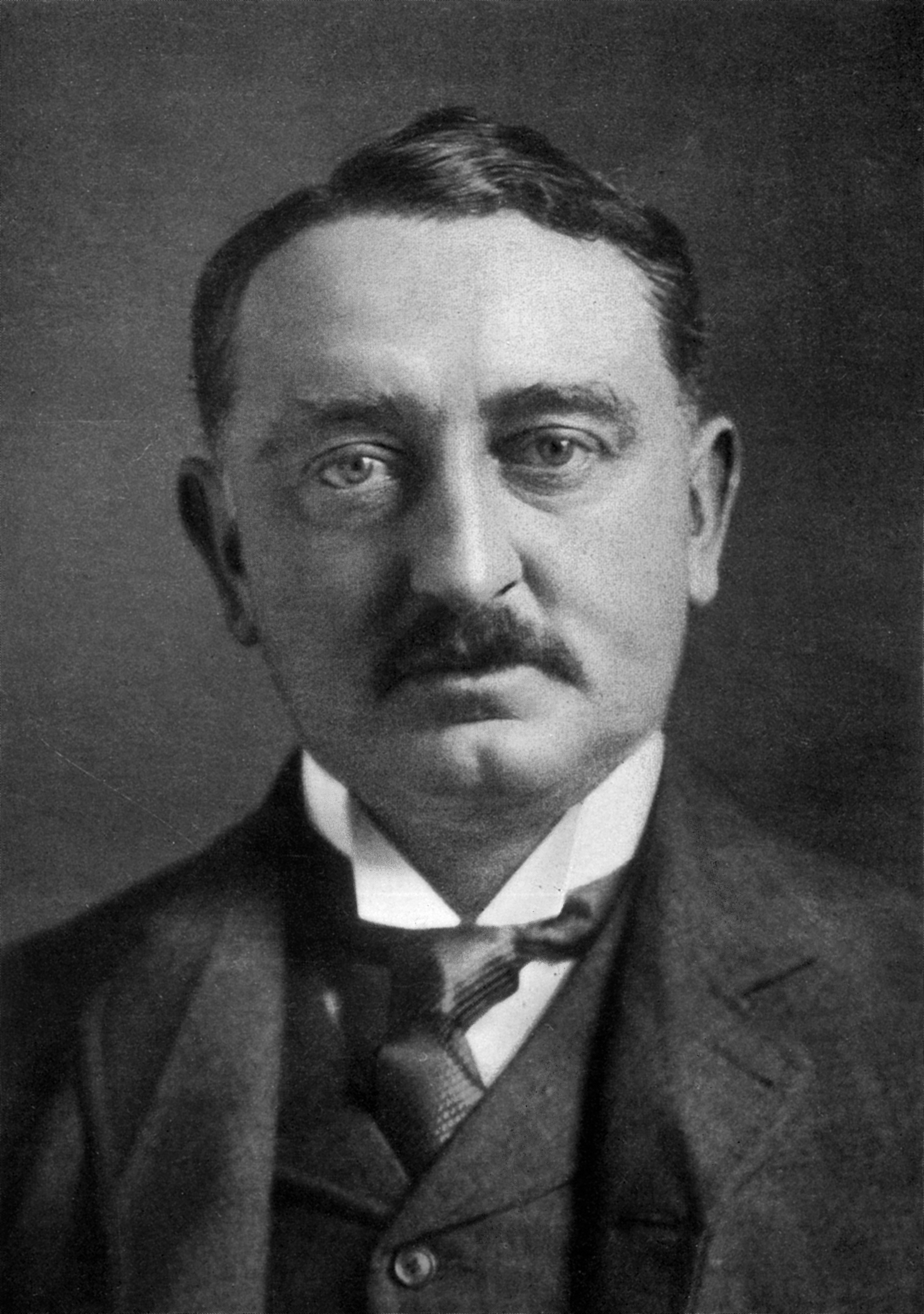
Cecil Rhodes (1853–1902), Founding chairman of the board of directors of De Beers Mining Company, funded by Nathaniel, 1st Lord Rothschild

The Federation of Rhodesia and Nyasaland dissolved on 1 January 1964. In the break up, the majority of the Federation's military and financial assets were transferred to the Southern Rhodesian government leaving it with the second largest military in Southern Africa behind only South Africa. The reason that it was transferred to the Southern Rhodesian government was that Southern Rhodesia had borne the brunt of the expenses of the federation and the British did not want to see it fall into the hands of the African nationalists.

=== Unilateral Declaration of Independence (1965-1979) ===
On 7 October 1964, the Southern Rhodesian government announced that when Northern Rhodesia achieved independence as Zambia, the Southern Rhodesian government would officially become known as the Rhodesian Government and the colony would become known as Rhodesia. While the new name was widely used, Southern Rhodesia remained the official name of the colony and the United Kingdom continued to refer to it under that name in legislation including Southern Rhodesia Act 1965 which declared Southern Rhodesia's Unilateral Declaration of Independence illegal and without legal effect.

In 1965, Rhodesia unilaterally declared itself independent under a white-minority controlled government headed by Ian Smith. A long civil war began between the white-minority controlled government and two African nationalist organizations the Zimbabwe People's Revolutionary Army (ZAPU) and Zimbabwe African National Liberation Army (ZANU) who received support from neighbouring African countries as well as the Soviet Union and People's Republic of China. The Salisbury government, realising the situation was untenable, and facing strong international pressure, concluded the Internal Settlement with black nationalist leaders in March 1978.

A general election held in April 1979 resulted in the renamed Zimbabwe Rhodesia being led by a unity government which in December 1979 concluded the Lancaster House Agreement, whereby Britain resumed control on 12 December 1979.

=== Return to British rule and independence (1979-1980) ===
The Lancaster House Agreement stipulated that control over the territory be returned to the United Kingdom in preparation for elections to be held in the spring of 1980. On 12 December 1979 Lord Soames arrived to take control as Governor of Southern Rhodesia. The name of the territory formally reverted to Southern Rhodesia at this time, although the name Zimbabwe Rhodesia remained in many of the country's institutions. On 18 April, Southern Rhodesia became independent as Zimbabwe.

== See also ==
- Administrative posts of the British South Africa Company in Southern Rhodesia
- Albert John Lutuli, a famous South African born in Southern Rhodesia
- Governor-General of the Federation of Rhodesia and Nyasaland
- History of Zimbabwe
- List of presidents of Zimbabwe
- President of Rhodesia
- Southern Rhodesia in World War I
- Tati Concessions Land, a region detached from Matebeleland and annexed to the Bechuanaland Protectorate
- High Court of Southern Rhodesia

== Bibliography ==
- Blake, Robert (1978). A History of Rhodesia. New York: Knopf. ISBN 0-394-48068-6.
- Shutt, Allison K. (2015). Manners Make a Nation: Racial Etiquette in Southern Rhodesia, 1910–1963. Rochester: University of Rochester Press.
