= Legislative Council of Southern Rhodesia =

Inaugural governing body of Southern Rhodesia

The Legislative Council of Southern Rhodesia was the inaugural governing body for the British South Africa Company (BSAC) territory of Southern Rhodesia (today Zimbabwe) before its replacement by the Southern Rhodesian Legislative Assembly in 1923, when the country achieved responsible government, and duly became a self-governing colony within the British Empire.

The Council was established on 20 October 1898, and the first election for the Council was held on 17 April 1899. The Council sat for the first time in May 1899. Initially, the Council consisted of four elected members and five members nominated by the British South Africa Company, with the BSAC administrator presiding (and who also holding the right of veto over any legislation). Additionally, a British resident commissioner sat on the Council as a non-voting member.

Qualifications for members and franchise were set by the commissioner, who required voters to be British subjects, male, 21 years of age and older, able to write their address and occupation, and then to fulfil any one of the following financial requirements:

- (a) ownership of a registered mining claim in Southern Rhodesia
  (b) six months' continuous residence in Southern Rhodesia, and the occupation there of immovable property worth at least £75 (about (£5,794 in today's money)
  (c) six months' continuous residence in Southern Rhodesia, and the receipt there of wages or salary worth at least £50 per annum (£3,863 per annum today).

All voters were entered onto a common roll.

Due to continuing pressure by white settlers for a greater role in the administration of the colony, the number of elected representatives on the Council was gradually increased, so that by 1920 there were 13 elected members.

The main issue debated in the Legislative Council by the 1910s was the future of Southern Rhodesia following the planned end of BSAC rule. When responsible government was granted to Southern Rhodesia in 1923, the Legislative Council was replaced by the Legislative Assembly. Under the 1924 Constitution, there was provision for the establishment of an upper house to be known as the Legislative Council, but none was ever established.
