= Southern Rhodesia in World War I =

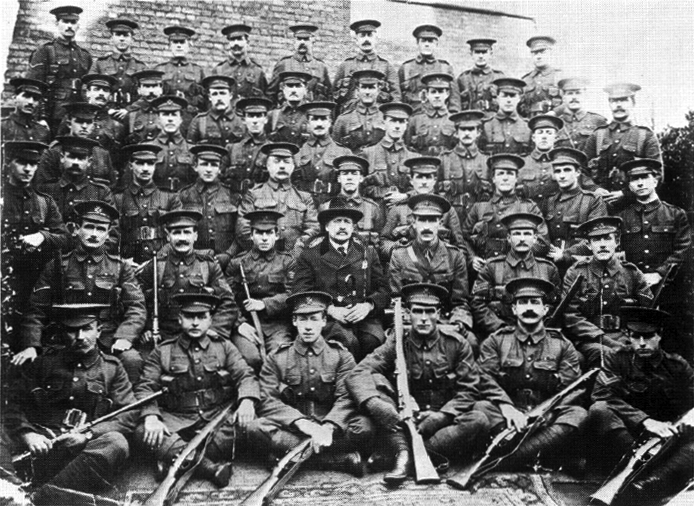
The original King's Royal Rifle Corps Rhodesian Platoon, Sheerness, England, November 1914. Capt. J. B. Brady (third from right, second row) and the Marquess of Winchester (fourth) sponsored the unit. Most pictured were later killed or seriously wounded.

In August 1914, the United Kingdom declared war on the German Empire at the start of World War I. The settler society in Southern Rhodesia, (Note: Renamed Zimbabwe in 1980.) which was administered by the British South Africa Company, received the news with great patriotic enthusiasm. The Company administrator, Sir William Milton, wired the British government, saying, "All Rhodesia... ready to do its duty". Although it supported the British Empire, the company was concerned about the possible financial implications for its chartered territory to make direct commitments to the war effort, particularly at first. As a result, most of the colony's contributions to the war were made by Southern Rhodesians individually—not only those who volunteered to fight abroad but also those who remained at home and raised funds to donate food, equipment, and other supplies.

Starting immediately after the outbreak of war, parties of white Southern Rhodesians paid their own way to England to join the British Army. Most Southern Rhodesians who served in the war enlisted in this way and fought on the Western Front, taking part in many of the major battles. They fought alongside an assortment of British, South African, and other colonial units, most commonly the King's Royal Rifle Corps, which recruited hundreds of men from the colony and created homogeneous Rhodesian platoons. Troopers from Southern Rhodesia became renowned on the Western Front for their marksmanship, a result of their frontier lifestyle. Some of the colony's men served in the Royal Flying Corps, one of the two predecessors of the Royal Air Force. The Rhodesia Regiment, the Rhodesia Native Regiment, and the British South Africa Police served in the African theatre of the conflict, contributing to the South-West African and East African campaigns.

Though it was one of the few combatant territories not to raise fighting men through conscription, proportional to the white population, Southern Rhodesia contributed more manpower to the British war effort than any other dominion or colony and more than Britain itself. White troops numbered 5,716, about 40% of white men in the colony, with 1,720 of these serving as commissioned officers. The Rhodesia Native Regiment recruited 2,507 black soldiers; approximately 30 black recruits served as scouts for the Rhodesia Regiment, and approximately 350 black soldiers were assigned to British and South African units. Over 800 Southern Rhodesians of all races died on operational service during the war, with many more seriously wounded.

The territory's contributions during the First World War became a major entry in many histories of the colony and a great source of pride for the white community, as well as for some black Rhodesians. It played a part in the UK government's decision to grant self-government in 1923. The contribution remained prominent in the national consciousness for decades to come. When the colonial government unilaterally declared independence from Britain in 1965, it deliberately did so on Armistice Day, 11 November, and signed the proclamation at 11:00 local time. After the territory's reconstitution and recognized independence as Zimbabwe in 1980, the government removed many references to the war, such as memorial monuments and plaques from public view, regarding them as unwelcome vestiges of white minority rule and colonialism. The Zimbabwean cultural memory largely forgot the First World War. Some monuments remain, including the Bulawayo Cenotaph, which was restored in 2017. A number of memorials are maintained by the Commonwealth War Graves Commission.

== Background ==
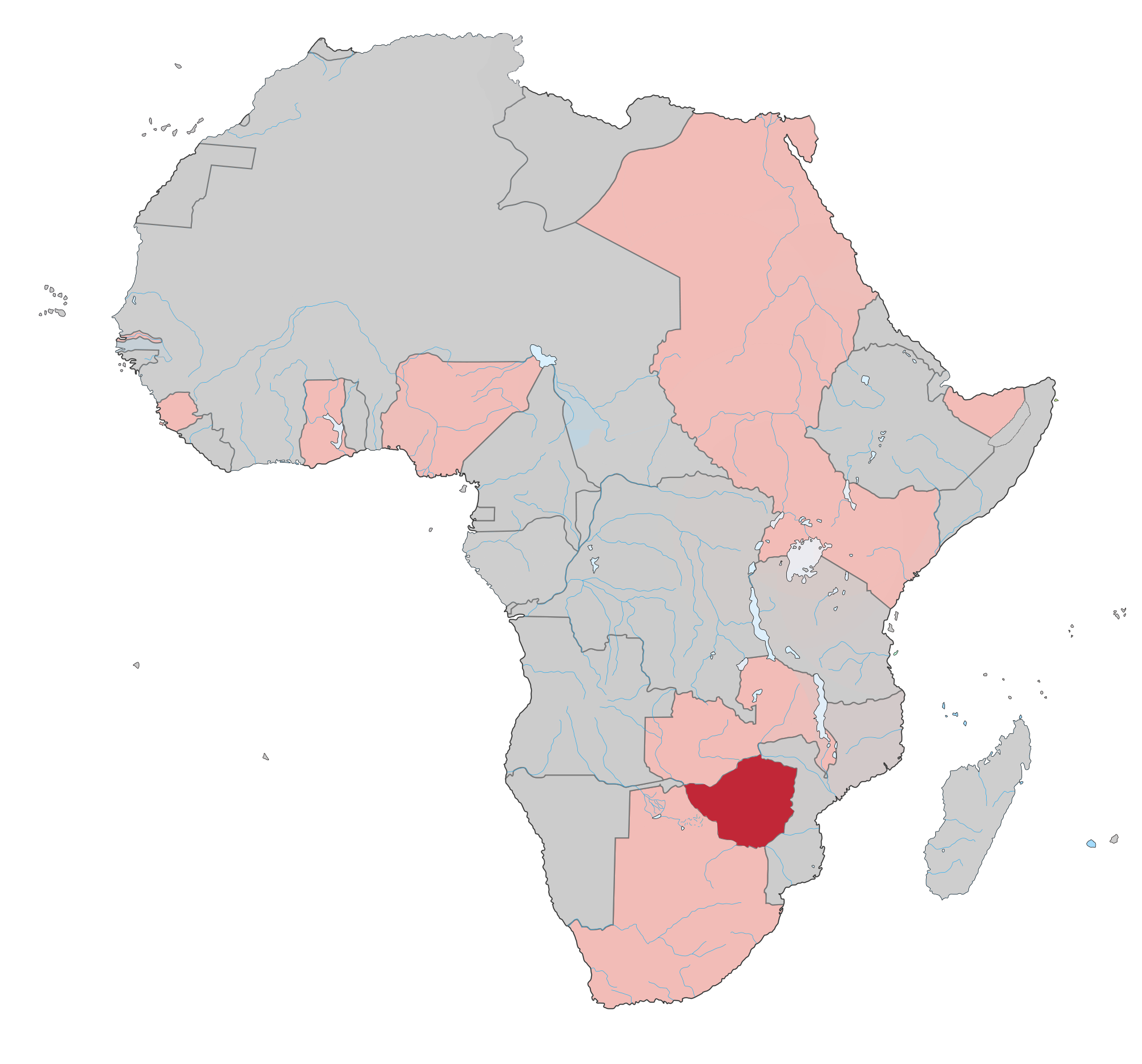
Southern Rhodesia, highlighted in red on a map of Africa in 1914; other British possessions in pink

At the time of World War I (also known as the First World War or the Great War), Southern Rhodesia was administered by the British South Africa Company, which had controlled it and Northern Rhodesia since acquiring them through diplomacy and conquest during the 1890s. The white population in Southern Rhodesia stood at 23,606 in 1911 (a minority of 3%), while Northern Rhodesia had about 3,000 white settlers (less than half of 1%). (Note: Southern Rhodesia referred to Company territories south of the Zambezi, while those to the north were called Northern Rhodesia. The name "Rhodesia" formally covered both north and south, but was often used to refer to the southern territory alone (for example, the names of almost all Southern Rhodesian military units omitted the word "Southern"). Soldiers from Southern Rhodesia generally described themselves simply as Rhodesians.) With the company's charter expiring in late 1914, most Southern Rhodesian public attention was focused on this issue before the outbreak of war. The settlers were split between those who backed continued administration by the Chartered Company and those who advocated responsible government, which would make Southern Rhodesia a self-governing colony within the British Empire. Still, others favored the integration of Southern Rhodesia into the Union of South Africa, which had been formed in 1910. (Note: Section 150 of the South Africa Act 1909, which formed the Union, explicitly provisioned for the accession to it of Company-administered territories as new provinces.) Following the intervention of the war, the charter was renewed for 10 years in early 1915.

Before 1914, Southern Rhodesia's police force was the British South Africa Police (BSAP), first raised in 1889 and reconstituted into a more permanent form in 1896. This paramilitary, mounted infantry force was theoretically also the country's standing army. Organized along military lines, it served in the First and Second Matabele Wars of the 1890s, operated on Britain's side in the Anglo-Boer War of 1899–1902 (alongside the specially-raised Rhodesia Regiment), and by 1914, it comprised about 1,150 men (including officers). Reserves existed in the form of the Southern Rhodesia Volunteers, an all-white amateur force with a paper strength of 2,000, intended for mobilization against local uprisings. Few doubted the Volunteers' enthusiasm, but they were not extensively trained or equipped; though perhaps useful in a Rhodesian bush skirmish, most observers agreed they would be no match for professional soldiers in a conventional war. In any case, the Volunteers' enlistment contracts bound them for domestic service only.

== Outbreak of war ==
=== Announcement and reception ===
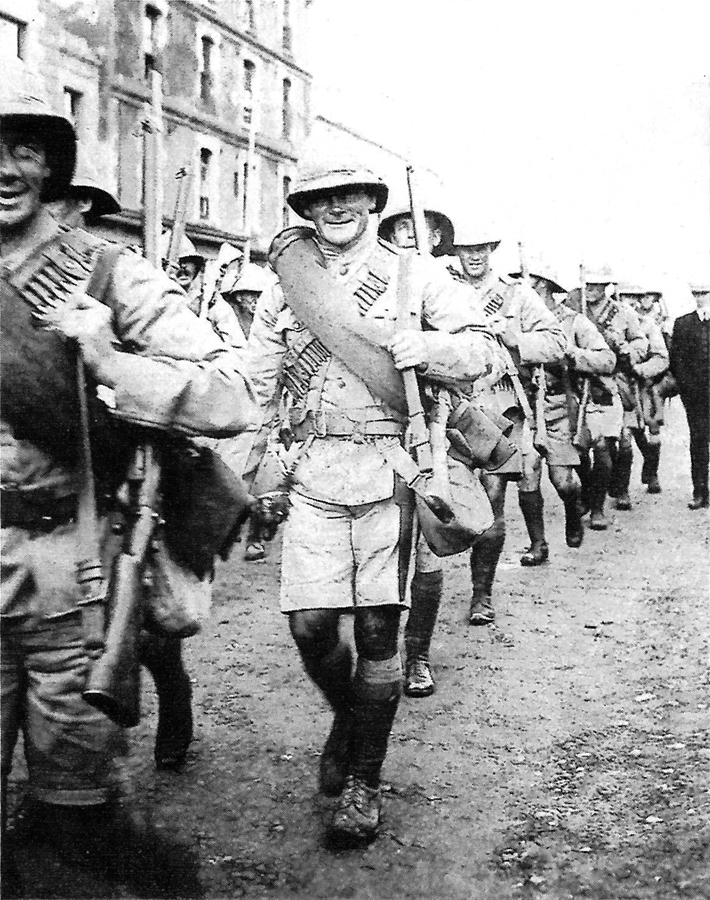
Men of the 1st Rhodesia Regiment in Cape Town, December 1914

When Britain declared war on Germany at 23:00 Greenwich Mean Time on 4 August 1914, the British Empire's dominions and colonies automatically became involved as well. Word of this reached the Southern Rhodesian capital city Salisbury during the night. Early on 5 August, the Company administrator Sir William Milton wired Whitehall: "All Rhodesia united in devoted loyalty to King and Empire and ready to do its duty." A few hours later he officially announced to the populace that Southern Rhodesia was at war. The Rhodesia Herald and Bulawayo Chronicle newspapers published special editions the same day to spread the news; it took about half a week for word to reach the whole country, but jingoistic demonstrations began in the major towns almost immediately.

In the words of the historian Peter McLaughlin, the Southern Rhodesian settlers "seemed to out-British the British" in their patriotic zeal, so it was to the frustration of many of them that the Company did not immediately commit to any martial action. While it sent supportive messages to Whitehall, the Company felt it could not raise any kind of expeditionary force without first considering the implications for its administrative operations; as a commercial concern, it was possible for the company to go bankrupt. Who would foot the bill for war expenditure, its hierarchy pondered: the Company itself, the Rhodesian taxpayers or the British government?

As the local newspapers filled with letters from readers clamouring for Rhodesian troops to be mustered and despatched to Europe post-haste, the administration limited its initial contribution to posting a section of BSAP troopers to the Victoria Falls Bridge to guard against possible German attack from South-West Africa though the Caprivi Strip. In early September, an indignant letter to the Rhodesia Herald from Colonel Raleigh Grey, a major figure in local business, politics and military matters, accused the Company of bringing "a slur on a British country" by doing so little.

=== Rhodesian Reserves ===
A few days after the war began, the Chartered Company formed the Rhodesian Reserves, an amorphous entity intended to accommodate the many white men who were keen to put on uniform, as well as to make a start towards organizing what might eventually become an expeditionary force. Eminent citizens and elected leaders formed their own platoons, each bringing 24 volunteers; three or four of these 25-man troops made a company. Units representing the Caledonian Society, the Lancashire and Yorkshire Society, the Legion of Frontiersmen and other local organizations mirrored the Pals battalions in Britain. Volunteers could opt to serve overseas, within Rhodesia or only locally; around 1,000 had volunteered in all by 13 August.

The Company suggested to the UK government that it might dispatch 500 troopers from the Rhodesian Reserves to Europe to act as an all-Southern Rhodesian unit on the Western Front (in Belgium and France), but the War Office in London replied that such an expeditionary force would be more practically deployed in Africa, within the South African forces. When the Company relayed this idea south, the South Africans said they were happy to take the Southern Rhodesians, but only if they enlisted independently in existing Union regiments. The Company found itself in the unusual position of having a prospective expeditionary force that nobody wanted. Unwilling to wait, some Southern Rhodesian would-be soldiers made their own way to Britain to join the British Army directly, as individuals or in groups. By the end of October 1914, about 300 were on their way.

== Europe ==
=== Western Front ===
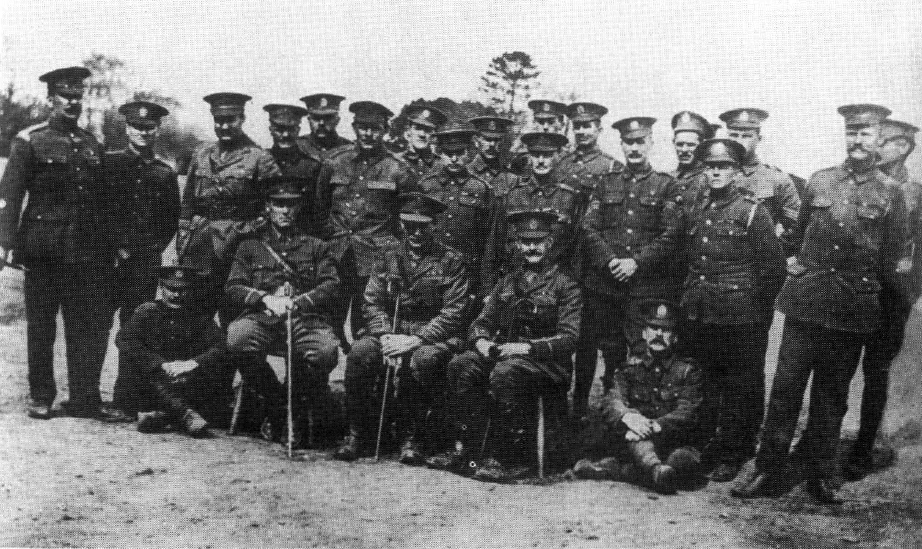
Southern Rhodesian members of King Edward's Horse, a British Army cavalry regiment

In terms of fighting manpower, Southern Rhodesia's main contribution to World War I was in the trenches of the Western Front. As the white Southern Rhodesians in this theatre joined the British Army separately, at different times and under their own steam (or were already connected to specific units as reservists), they were spread across dozens of regiments, including the Black Watch, the Coldstream Guards, the Grenadier Guards, the Royal Engineers and the Royal Marines, as well as many South African units and others. During the war's opening months, Southern Rhodesian volunteers who could not afford to travel to England were assisted by a private fund set up by Ernest Lucas Guest, a Salisbury lawyer and Anglo-Boer War veteran who also organized an accompanying recruitment campaign for European service. Guest stopped recruiting at the company's request after it created the 1st Rhodesia Regiment, an expeditionary force to South and South-West Africa, in October 1914.

A link developed during the war with the King's Royal Rifle Corps (KRRC), whose Southern Rhodesian contingent—numbering a few hundred, chiefly in its 2nd and 3rd Battalions—was the largest on the Western Front. The connection with this particular corps began as the result of a chance conversation aboard the ship that took the first batch of Southern Rhodesians from Cape Town to Southampton in late 1914. The 16th Marquess of Winchester, who had links with Rhodesia dating back to the 1890s, was also aboard the ship, returning from a visit to the colony. Encountering Captain John Banks Brady, the officer of Irish origin who led the volunteers, the Marquess asked where his party was headed. Brady enthusiastically replied that they were going to war together in France. The Marquess suggested to Brady that since it might be difficult to prevent his men from being split up during the enlistment process, it might be a good idea for the Rhodesians to join the KRRC, where he could keep an eye on them through his connections with the Winchester-based regiment. The Southern Rhodesian contingent duly mustered into the KRRC. A designated Rhodesian platoon, widely referred to thereafter as "the Rhodesian Platoon", was formed under Brady at the KRRC training camp at Sheerness, on the Isle of Sheppey in Kent.

They are not only intensely British, but quite intolerably Rhodesian ... they exhibit a tendency to collect together, [and] are inclined to vaunt themselves, to be puffed up by the mere fact that they are Rhodesians.

— A contemporary South African opinion on Rhodesians abroad

As a rule, the white Rhodesians overseas combined stridently pro-British attitudes with an even stronger pride in Rhodesia. Many of them saw participation in the war, particularly in distinct "Rhodesian" formations, as a step towards forging a distinctive national identity, like those of Australia and the other more mature British dominions, and building a case for Southern Rhodesian self-government. The existence of an explicitly Rhodesian Platoon in the KRRC endeared the regiment to the Southern Rhodesian public, and attracted many of the colony's volunteers who arrived in England later in the war; in time, the KRRC formed further Rhodesian platoons from additional personnel. While the average Rhodesian colonial, living on the frontier of the Empire, was at least casually acquainted with rifles, most Englishmen had never held one. At Sheerness, Brady's Rhodesian Platoon won a reputation for fine sharpshooting, and set a regimental record score at the shooting range.

Once posted to France in December 1914, the Rhodesian Platoon almost immediately began suffering regular heavy casualties. Southern Rhodesian volunteers continued to arrive piecemeal in England throughout the conflict, so Rhodesian formations on the Western Front received regular reinforcements in small batches, but because casualties were usually concentrated in far larger groups it often took a few months for a depleted Southern Rhodesian unit to return to full numerical strength. A cycle developed whereby Rhodesian platoons in Belgium and France were abruptly decimated and then gradually built up again only to suffer the same fate on returning to action. When the KRRC's Rhodesian platoons took part in British offensives, they were easily recognized by a distinctive battle cry that their men shouted as they went over the top. Sometimes the British and German positions were so close that troopers on each front line could hear what was said in the opposite trench; one group of Southern Rhodesians avoided being understood in this situation by speaking a mixture of Shona and Sindebele (two African languages) instead of English.

The cold is frightfully trying. It is snowing and freezing hard tonight, and it makes me yearn to be back on my farm on the Hunyani ...

— A Rhodesian writes home from the First Battle of Ypres, late 1914

Trench warfare was a dreadful ordeal for soldiers, and the Southern Rhodesians, coming from the open veld of southern Africa, had a particularly difficult time getting used to the cold and the mud. Brady reported that some of his men had contracted frostbite within 48 hours of reaching the trenches. Despite this, the KRRC's Rhodesians acquitted themselves well in the eyes of their superiors; Lieutenant-Colonel Sir Edward Hutton, who wrote a history of the KRRC, commented that the Southern Rhodesian contingent "earned for itself great reputation for valor and good shooting". Southern Rhodesians became especially valuable to the KRRC as designated snipers, grenadiers, Lewis Gunners and other specialists. While discussing a KRRC sniper section, Hutton singles its Southern Rhodesian members out for their fine marksmanship, commenting that "accustomed to big game shooting, [they] particularly excelled in this system of 'snipers', and inflicted continual losses upon the enemy". In their 2008 history of sniping, Pat Farey and Mark Spicer highlight the prowess of South African and Rhodesian sharpshooters on the Western Front, and claim that one group of 24 southern Africans collectively accounted for over 3,000 German casualties and fatalities.

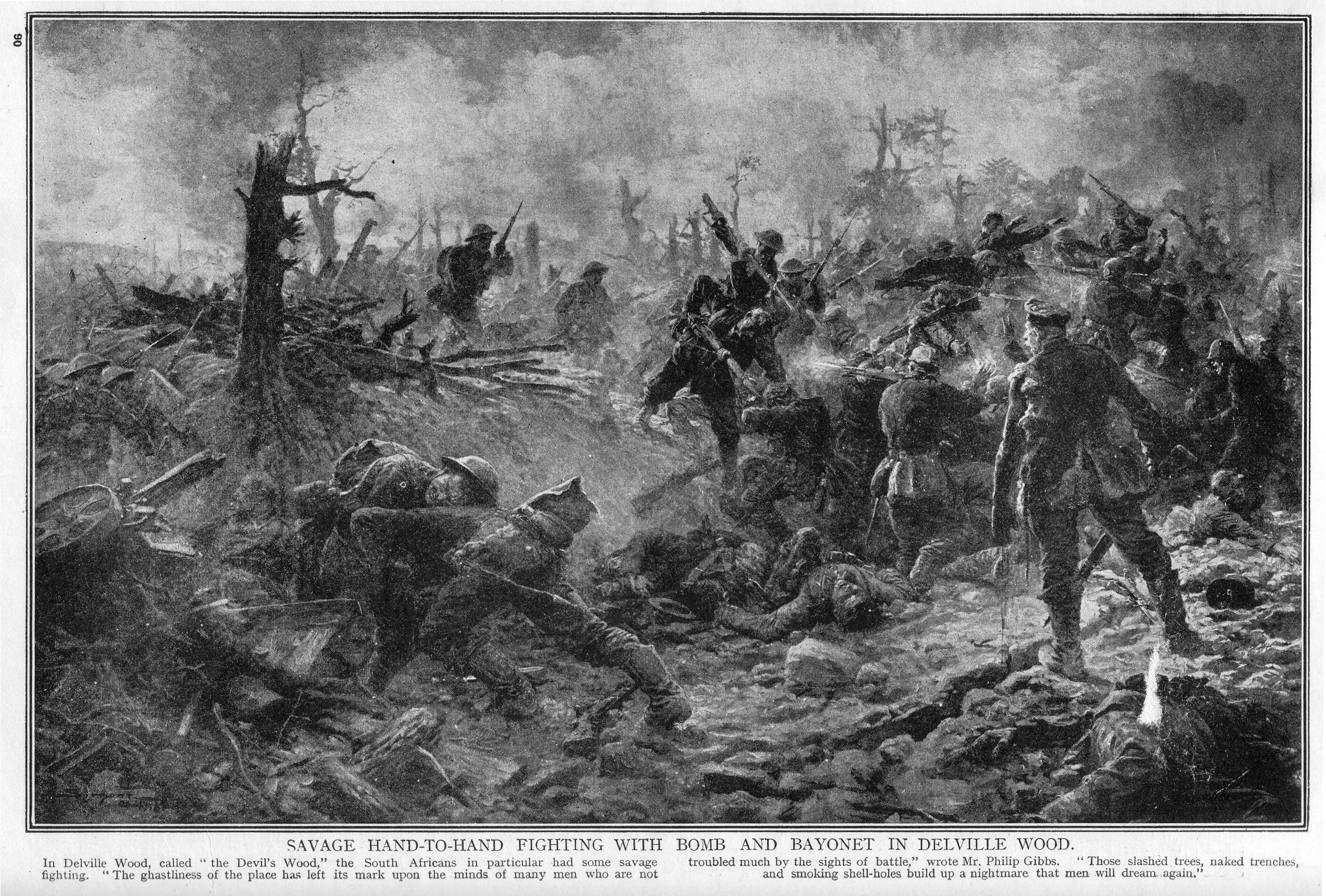
South Africans and Rhodesians fight the Germans hand-to-hand in Delville Wood

So many Southern Rhodesians were withdrawn from the trenches for officer training that in mid-1915, Brady appealed through the Salisbury and Bulawayo presses for more volunteers to replace those who had been commissioned. A platoon of Southern Rhodesians with the 2nd Battalion, KRRC took part in the "big push" of 1 July 1916, the first day of the Battle of the Somme, charging German positions elsewhere on the line early that morning. There were 90 Rhodesians on the eve of the attack and only 10 alive and unwounded afterwards. On the Somme battlefield itself, Rhodesians were among those at Delville Wood, which began on 14 July. This was the South African 1st Infantry Brigade's first engagement, (Note: The South African Brigade was split into four battalions: 1st South African Battalion (Cape), 2nd South African Battalion (Natal & Orange Free State), 3rd South African Battalion (Transvaal & Rhodesia) and 4th South African Battalion (Scottish). Most Rhodesian members were in the 3rd Battalion.) and some of the colonials blacked up and imitated Zulu battle cries and war dances. Despite suffering casualties of catastrophic proportions—about 80% of the brigade's personnel were killed, wounded, or captured—they took the Wood and held it as ordered until they were relieved on 20 July. By the time of its withdrawal, the South African Brigade, originally numbering 3,155 (123 officers and 3,032 other ranks), had been reduced to 19 officers and 600 men. Delville Wood was later described by Sir B H Liddell Hart as "the bloodiest battle hell of 1916". "God knows I never wish to see such horrible sights again," a Southern Rhodesian veteran of the battle wrote home; "at times I wished it would come fast, anything to get out of that terrible death-trap and murderous place."

German gas attacks were among the most traumatic experiences for the Southern Rhodesians in Europe. One Rhodesian survivor of a gas attack described the sensation as like "suffocation, [or] slow drowning". The Germans used both disabling agents, such as tear gas and the more severe mustard gas, and lethal chemicals like chlorine and phosgene. Though generally not fatal, gas attacks caused extreme physical discomfort and pain, often to the point where soldiers lost consciousness. Mustard gas in particular caused blistering of the skin, vomiting and internal and external bleeding. The British Army issued gas masks, but according to Brady these did little to help the men. Injuries sustained to the eyes, lungs and nasal passages in gas attacks were often extremely debilitating and lasting, remaining with the men for years after the war.

In July 1917, a KRRC Rhodesian platoon received lofty praise from a senior British officer, who described the colonials as "absolutely first-class soldiers and great gentlemen, every bit as good as soldiers… as our old Expeditionary Force". Around the same time, a platoon of Southern Rhodesians in the KRRC took part in an engagement near Nieuwpoort in Flanders, where it and the Northamptonshire Regiment manned positions on the eastern banks of the river Yser. After a heavy artillery bombardment, German infantry and marines charged the British positions and surrounded the Rhodesian platoon. Brutal hand-to-hand fighting ensued in which most of the Southern Rhodesians were killed and some were taken prisoner. The Bulawayo Chronicle ran a eulogy for them soon after, comparing their last stand to that of Allan Wilson's Shangani Patrol in 1893. Later in 1917, a Rhodesian platoon in the KRRC fought in the Battle of Passchendaele, near Ypres in western Flanders.

The Western Front continued to receive Southern Rhodesian troops right up to the end of the war, including veterans of the 2nd Rhodesia Regiment's campaign in East Africa. During the conflict's latter stages, the British Army sent some of its Southern Rhodesian officers to the Western Front to promote the colony's benefits, hoping to encourage emigration there by British servicemen after the war.

=== Salonika ===
The KRRC's 3rd Battalion, including a platoon of 70 Rhodesians, was transferred from France to the Salonika front in 1915. On this comparatively quiet front, they were slowly whittled down over the course of the war: 26 of them remained in January 1917, and by the end of the war so few were left that the platoon no longer existed. Most of the men had been killed in action, while others were prisoners of the Bulgarians.

=== Aviators ===
Lieutenant Daniel "Pat" Judson, the first airman born in Rhodesia

Some Southern Rhodesians mustered into the Royal Flying Corps (RFC), which merged with the Royal Naval Air Service in April 1918 to form the Royal Air Force. Towards the end of the war, the service of airmen from the dominions and colonies was observed by the issuing of shoulder patches denoting the wearer's country of origin: from October 1918, Southern Rhodesians received labels marked "rhodesia". One of the territory's first military aviators was Lieutenant Arthur R H Browne, a fighter pilot from Umvuma in the Southern Rhodesian Midlands, who was attached to No. 13 Squadron, RFC. He was killed in action in a dogfight on 5 December 1915; his aircraft, donated by the people of Gatooma in western Mashonaland, was Gatooma No. 2, one of five airplanes purchased by Southern Rhodesian public donations. From Dryden Farm, near the south-western border town of Plumtree, came Lieutenant Frank W H Thomas, an RFC combat pilot who won the Military Cross, as well as the French Croix de Guerre (with palms), before he died on 5 January 1918 from wounds attained on operational service.

Lieutenant Daniel S "Pat" Judson, born in Bulawayo in 1898, became the first Rhodesia-born airman in history when he joined the RFC in April 1916. He was severely wounded while bombing enemy positions in March 1918, but recovered and remained in the unit until April 1919. The first flying ace born in Rhodesia was Major George Lloyd, nicknamed "Zulu", who joined No. 60 Squadron in April 1917, and won four aerial victories before transferring to No. 40 Squadron in July 1917, where he won four more. He received the Military Cross in March 1918 for "conspicuous gallantry and devotion to duty", and also won the Air Force Cross later that year. Second Lieutenant David "Tommy" Greswolde-Lewis, a born and bred Bulawayan, was the 80th and final pilot defeated by Manfred von Richthofen, the German ace widely known as the Red Baron. Richthofen downed Lewis just north-east of Villers-Bretonneux on 20 April 1918; the Rhodesian's aircraft caught fire in mid-air, and when it crashed he was thrown from the wreckage. The Baron's bullets had hit Lewis' compass, goggles, coat and trouser leg, but he was practically unhurt, having suffered only minor burns. He spent the rest of the war a German prisoner. (Note: Richthofen was killed in action the following day, 21 April 1918. Lewis, who returned to Rhodesia after the war, gained minor celebrity in military circles as the Baron's "last victim", and was invited by the Luftwaffe to attend the dedication of a new German fighter wing named after Richthofen in 1938.)

The Great War airman associated with Southern Rhodesia who ultimately earned the most distinction was Arthur Harris, originally from England, who joined the Royal Flying Corps in late 1915 after serving as a bugler with the 1st Rhodesia Regiment in South-West Africa. Harris alternated between Britain and France during the latter part of the war. He led No. 45 Squadron over the Western Front in 1917, destroying five German aircraft and winning the Air Force Cross, and afterwards commanded No. 44 Squadron in Britain. Intending to return to Southern Rhodesia after the war, he wore a "rhodesia" flash on his uniform during the hostilities, but ended up staying with the RAF as a career officer. He finished the war a major, rose through the ranks during the interwar period and became famous during World War II as "Bomber Harris", the head of RAF Bomber Command.

== Southern Africa ==
=== Maritz Rebellion; formation of 1st Rhodesia Regiment ===
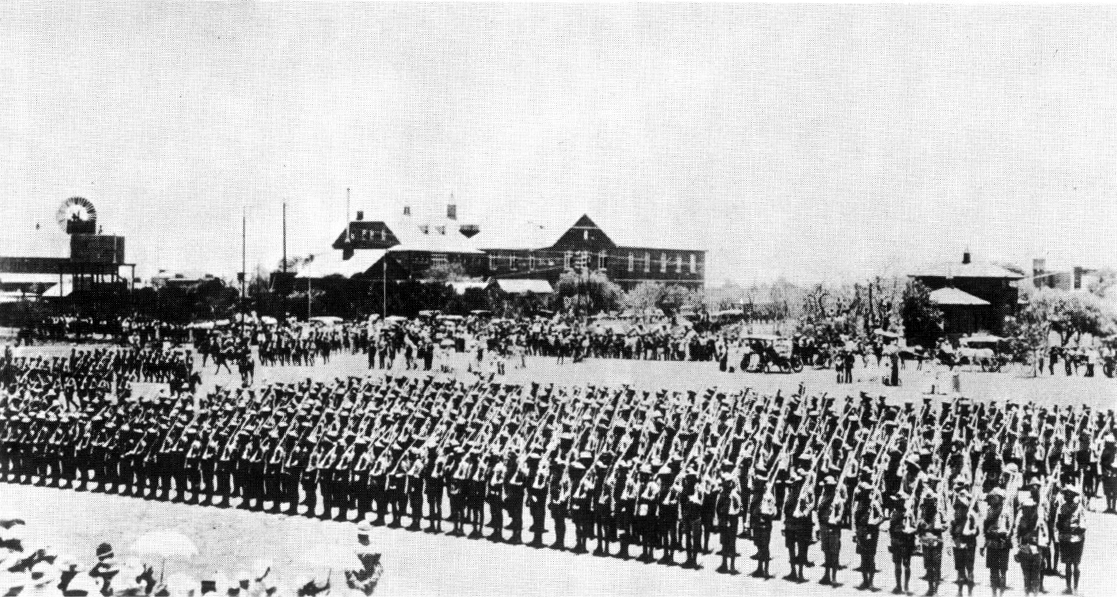
The 1st Rhodesia Regiment parades in Bulawayo on its way south, 1914

Apart from the capture of Schuckmannsburg in the Caprivi Strip by a combined force of BSAP and Northern Rhodesia Police on 21 September 1914, the British South Africa Company's own armed forces and police remained almost totally uninvolved in the war until the following month. The South African Prime Minister, the former Boer general Louis Botha, had told Britain that the Union could both handle its own security during the hostilities and defeat German South-West Africa without help, so the Imperial garrison had been sent to the Western Front. Lieutenant-Colonel Manie Maritz—an ex-Boer commander who now headed a column of Afrikaans-speaking Union troops—defected to the Germans in mid-September, hoping to spark an uprising that would overthrow British supremacy in South Africa and restore the old Boer Republics. Botha requested the 500-man column that the Chartered Company had raised, hoping to reduce the possibility of further defections by interspersing his own forces with firmly pro-British Rhodesians. The expeditionary force was promptly formed in Salisbury, and named the 1st Rhodesia Regiment after the unit of Southern Rhodesian volunteers that had fought in the Anglo-Boer War. Apart from a small contingent of Matabele (or Ndebele) scouts, the unit was all white.

This is the last time I shall see you all together, and I now take the opportunity to thank you for the way you have played the game, and for the trouble you have taken to get fit for duty and to take the field. Remember, Rhodesia looks to you.

— Colonel Alfred Edwards addresses the 1st Rhodesia Regiment at Salisbury railway station, October 1914

After six weeks' training in the capital, the 1st Rhodesia Regiment travelled south by railway in late October 1914. During its stopover in Bulawayo, it paraded in front of about 90% of the town's population; Plumtree, the last stop before crossing the border, provided the soldiers with a lavish parting banquet. Notwithstanding these grand farewells, the Maritz Rebellion was all but over by the time the Southern Rhodesian contingent reached its destination at Bloemfontein. The vast majority of South African troops, including most of Boer origin, had remained loyal to the Union government, and the uprising had been quashed. The Rhodesians garrisoned Bloemfontein for about a month, then redeployed to Cape Town, where they underwent further training for the South-West Africa Campaign as part of South Africa's Northern Force, which Botha personally commanded.

=== 1st Rhodesia Regiment in South-West Africa ===
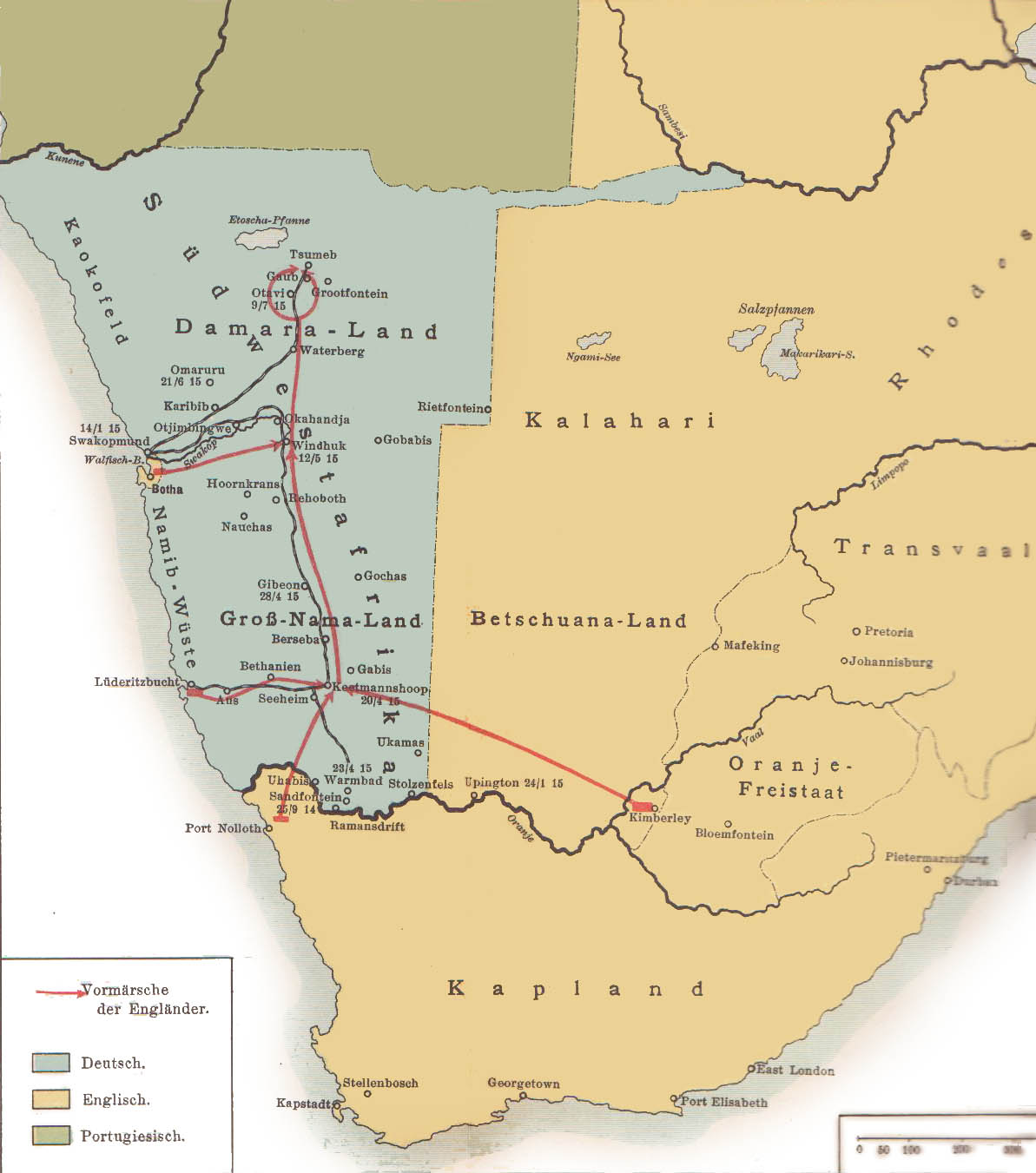
A map of the South-West Africa Campaign, showing South African troop movements in red. The main South African force advanced on Windhoek from Walvis Bay, an exclave of South Africa about halfway up the South-West African coast.

During late December 1914, Northern Force travelled to the South African exclave of Walvis Bay, about halfway up the coast of German South-West Africa. The 1st Rhodesia Regiment disembarked on 26 December 1914.

Northern Force made up the northern prong of a pincer movement designed by Botha to encircle the German forces in South-West Africa. Two smaller South African columns came from the Cape and the Orange Free State (the latter coming over the deserts of Bechuanaland). The principal target was Windhoek, the capital of South-West Africa. The field of operations was arid and barren in the extreme; water was a precious commodity, so the South Africans and Southern Rhodesians brought thousands of tons of it with them. In the 100 kilometres (62 mi) of desert between Walvis Bay and Windhoek, temperatures could rise to above 50 °C (122 °F) in the daytime, then drop below freezing at night, all while desert winds blew sand and dust into every bodily and mechanical orifice. Germany based much of its defensive strategy in South-West Africa around the assumption that no enemy commander could feasibly attempt to advance across the desert from Walvis Bay to Windhoek, but Botha resolved to do exactly that.

The South African offensive from Walvis Bay began in February 1915, when Northern Force took Swakopmund—the nearest German coastal settlement, about 20 kilometres (12 mi) north—without facing major resistance. The Germans almost immediately retreated, leaving behind explosive booby traps and other improvised weapons. The 1st Rhodesia Regiment first engaged the Germans while Northern Force moved east across the desert, taking part in a number of minor skirmishes and suffering its first two fatalities in a German ambush. To overcome the natural difficulties of the desert terrain, Botha used fast-moving mounted or mechanised troops rather than regular infantry, so the Southern Rhodesian contingent played little part in the main advance on Windhoek. The Rhodesians guarded the construction of a railway inland for much of the campaign, but participated in Northern Force's victory over the Germans at Trekkopjes, losing Lieutenant Hollingsworth (killed in action) and five enlisted men (wounded). Windhoek surrendered to Botha in July 1915, effectively ending the South-West African front of the war. The local German population did not embark on a guerrilla campaign after Windhoek's fall.

The 1st Rhodesia Regiment was soon posted back to Cape Town, where many of the troopers voiced their dissatisfaction at the lack of fighting in South-West Africa, and requested discharge so they could join the war in Europe. Superiors assured the men that they would see action in East Africa if they stayed, but failed to convince most of them; the 1st Rhodesia Regiment promptly disbanded due to a lack of personnel. The majority of the South-West Africa veterans boarded ship for England to enlist in the British Army, while others mustered into South African units already billed for European service.

== East Africa ==
German East Africa, highlighted in dark green on a map of Africa. Other German territories in light green

German East Africa, acquired by Germany during the 1880s, covered roughly 900,000 square kilometres (350,000 sq mi), and by 1914 was home to about 5,000 white settlers, most of whom were of German origin. German East African soldiery at the outbreak of war comprised 216 German officers and enlisted men, and 2,450 askaris (native soldiers); police numbered 45 whites and 2,154 askaris. Because of the British Royal Navy's domination of the Indian Ocean, German East Africa was largely isolated from outside help. It therefore fought a war of improvisation, judicious resource management and unorthodox strategy. During the conflict, its military strength grew to a peak of 3,300 whites and anywhere between 15,000 and 30,000 askaris, all commanded by Generalmajor Paul von Lettow-Vorbeck.

=== 2nd Rhodesia Regiment ===
Based around the overflow of volunteers for the 1st Rhodesia Regiment, a core of personnel for a second Southern Rhodesian expeditionary unit was in place by November 1914. This was made into the 2nd Rhodesia Regiment (2RR) during December 1914 and January 1915. The 1st Rhodesia Regiment's lack of combat experience thus far influenced those men in Southern Rhodesia who were yet to enlist; many Rhodesian colonials were keen to fight on the front lines, and some resolved that they might have to travel to Europe to be sure of doing so. Aware of this competition with the Western Front for the colony's manpower, recruiters for the 2RR took great care to assure potential inductees that they would definitely see combat, in Africa, if they signed up for the new unit. The 2RR ultimately had a paper strength of 500 men, the same as the 1st. Thirty black scouts, recruited in Southern Rhodesia, were also attached to the regiment.

Because it was raised with less urgency, the 2RR received better training than the 1st. The course lasted eight weeks, a fortnight longer than the original regiment's training period, and focused heavily on route marching, parade drill, and, in particular, marksmanship—recruits were trained to shoot accurately at ranges of up to 600 metres (2,000 ft). The 2RR left Salisbury on 8 March 1915, moving east to the port of Beira in Portuguese Mozambique, from where they sailed to Mombasa in British Kenya, on German East Africa's north-eastern flank. Travelling aboard the SS Umzumbi, the battalion disembarked in Kenya less than a week after leaving Salisbury. It was immediately sent inland to the operational area around Mount Kilimanjaro, within sight of which it set up camp. On 20 March, the regiment was inspected by General J M Stewart of the Indian Army. "I had expected to see a regiment that would require some training," Stewart said; "I will pay you the highest compliment by sending you to the front today." So began the 2RR's contribution to the East African Campaign.

The 2RR operated with some success during its first year on the front. It usually defeated German units that it encountered, but the Germans, using proto-guerrilla tactics, tended to retreat before they could be overrun. Though generally outnumbered and outgunned throughout the campaign, the Germans had the advantage early on of longer-range artillery than the British; from July to August 1916, 2RR was prevented from moving out of the Kenyan town of Makindu for nearly a month by German bombardment. The huge marching distances, difficult terrain and uncertainty of surroundings meant that the regiment's men were forced to develop enormous stamina and resilience if they were not to be invalided home.

Tropical disease killed or rendered ineffective far more 2RR men than the Germans did; at times the regiment was reduced to an effective strength of under 100 by the vast myriad of potential ailments, including trench fever, blackwater fever, dysentery, pneumonia, sleeping sickness and many others. The 1,038 personnel who served with 2RR in East Africa collectively went into hospital 2,272 times, and there were 10,626 incidences of illness—in other words, the average 2RR soldier was hospitalized twice and reported sick 10 times. In January 1917, only 91 of the regiment's men were considered fit for duty; it was no longer an effective fighting force, and the white Southern Rhodesian manpower did not exist to continue reinforcing it. It was therefore withdrawn from East Africa that month. Those men who were healthy enough to return home arrived back in Salisbury on 14 April 1917, receiving a tumultuous welcome, but the majority of 2RR remained in medical care overseas for some time afterwards.

The Company briefly considered sending a revived 2RR to the Western Front, but the British Army promptly rejected this idea, saying that the unit would be impractical for trench warfare because of its small size. The battalion was thereupon dissolved, but most of its remaining men went to war in Europe anyway, generally with South African units.

=== Rhodesia Native Regiment ===
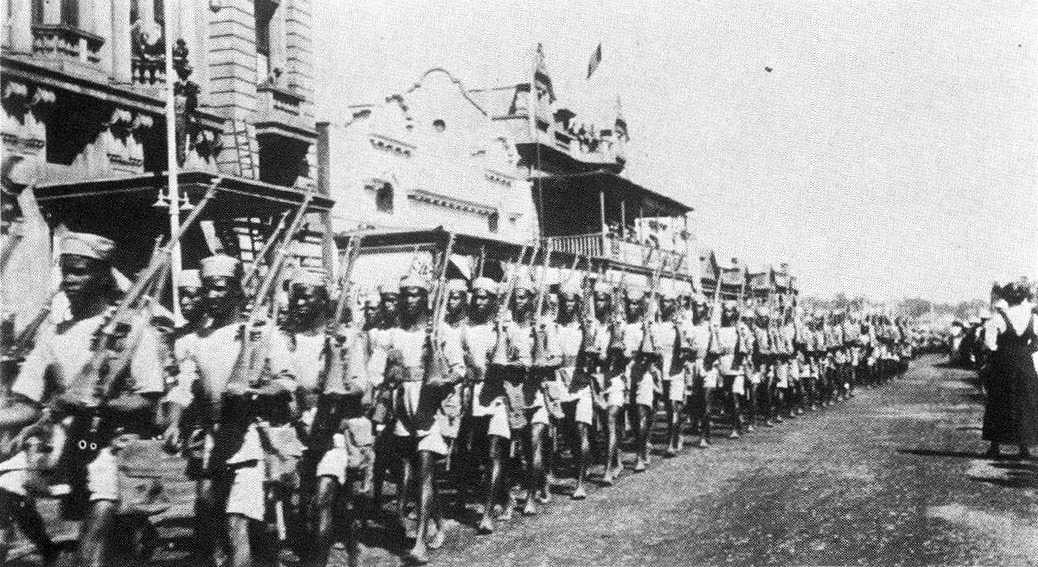
Men of the 1st Rhodesia Native Regiment marching through Salisbury before going to East Africa, 1916

By late 1915, British forces in the border areas of Northern Rhodesia and Nyasaland, on German East Africa's south-western flank, were severely stretched. Disease was a constant curse, decimating the ranks. Francis Drummond Chaplin, the British South Africa Company administrator in Southern Rhodesia, offered to provide the British with a column of between 500 and 1,000 askaris, and Whitehall accepted this in March 1916; however, there was then disagreement regarding who would foot the bill for the organization of this enterprise. After this was resolved in April 1916—the Company agreed to pay, conditional on reimbursement by the British Colonial Office—recruitment began in May.

Initial recruitment efforts principally targeted the Matabele, who made up about 20% of the colony's black population, because they enjoyed a popular reputation among whites for being great warriors; the unit was therefore originally called the "Matabele Regiment". This was changed to the more inclusive "Rhodesia Native Regiment" (RNR) on 15 May 1916, as the ranks proved to be more diverse than expected, and included large numbers of Mashonas and other ethnicities. In particular, a disproportionately high number of volunteers came from the Kalanga tribe, a numerically diminutive community in the colony's south-west. The RNR was organized largely along linguistic and cultural lines, with companies and platoons of Matabele, Mashona, Wayao and others. White officers attached to the unit were often recruited because they knew an African language, or could give orders in Chilapalapa, a pidgin of English and several African tongues often referred to by whites of the time as "kitchen kaffir". The ranks' diversity sometimes led to confusion when messages or directives were not properly understood. It became common for black troopers accused of disobeying or ignoring commands to claim ignorance of the language in which they had been ordered.

Commanded by Lieutenant-Colonel A J Tomlinson, the RNR, comprising 426 askaris and about 30 white officers, left Salisbury in July 1916 for Beira. They continued on to Zomba, in Nyasaland, where they were to receive further training closer to the field of operations. When they arrived, the local situation had shifted significantly, so the RNR instead went to New Langenberg, in German East Africa, just north of Lake Nyasa. At New Langenberg the regiment went through a short training course, and was issued with six machine guns. When the unit's training period ended in October 1916 it was divided; one company of RNR men went to Buhora, about 250 kilometres (160 mi) north-east, while the rest went 250 kilometres (160 mi) south to Weidhaven, on the north banks of Lake Nyasa, from where they moved 160 kilometres (99 mi) east to Songea, which they were ordered to "hold ... until reinforced". Apart from a company of men sent to patrol the road back to Weidhaven, the RNR proceeded to garrison Songea.

The Germans, who had left Songea only a few weeks before, sent two columns to retake it during early November 1916–250 askaris marched from Likuyu, and 180 more (with two machine guns) set off from Kitanda. The latter German column spotted the RNR company that was patrolling the road, and at Mabogoro attacked the advance guard, which was commanded by Sergeant (later Lieutenant) Frederick Charles Booth. The Rhodesians were caught by surprise, and many panicked, running about and firing randomly. Booth restored discipline and led the defense until reinforcements arrived. The Germans then retreated and continued towards Songea. During this contact, Booth advanced towards enemy fire to rescue a wounded scout who was lying in the open, and brought him back alive; for this and subsequent actions, Booth received the Victoria Cross in June 1917.

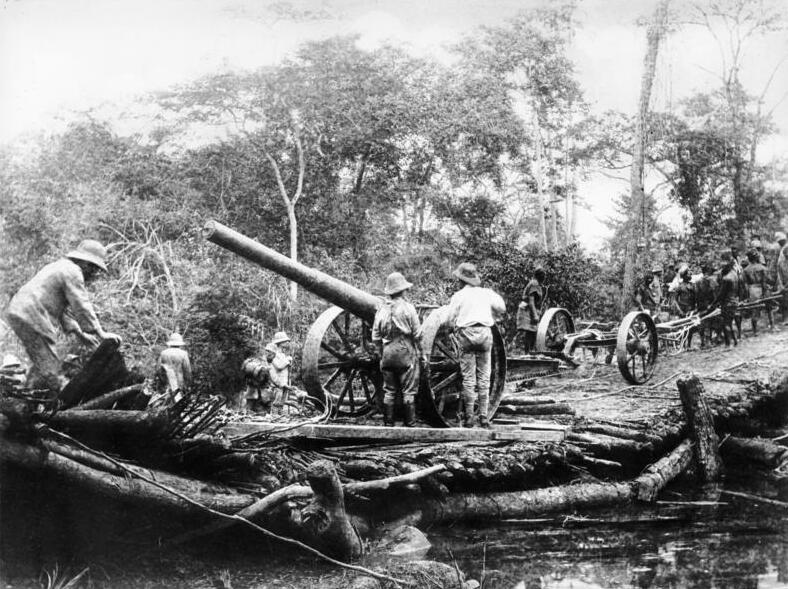
A gun from the sunken SMS Königsberg in the field in East Africa in 1916. The RNR captured one of these weapons in November 1916.

The German column from Kitanda reached Songea early in the morning on 12 November 1916, and unsuccessfully attempted a frontal assault on the well-entrenched Rhodesian positions. After the German column from Likuyu arrived in the afternoon, the Germans laid siege to Songea for 12 days before retreating towards Likuyu on the 24th. The Rhodesians were relieved the following day by a South African unit. The RNR then moved back to Litruchi, on the other side of Lake Nyasa, from where they sailed to the German East African town of Mwaya, where they were reunited with the RNR contingent that had gone to Buhora. This second column had ambushed a group of Germans, who were moving towards Northern Rhodesia with a naval gun salvaged from SMS Königsberg (which had been sunk at Rufiji Delta about a year before); after pocketing the Germans, the Rhodesians captured both them and the naval gun.

In Southern Rhodesia, Company officials judged the RNR to have been a success so far, and so decided in January 1917 to raise a second battalion. The unit already in the field was at this time designated 1st Battalion, abbreviated to "1RNR", while the new formation was called 2nd Battalion, or "2RNR". Recruitment was soon under way. Conscious of the difficulty that had been found in persuading rural Mashonas and Matabele to join the 1st Battalion in 1916, organizers for 2RNR principally targeted black men from other countries, in particular migrant workers from Nyasaland and Northern Rhodesia; Nyasalanders eventually made up nearly half of the regiment. (Note: Evidence regarding the exact composition of the Rhodesia Native Regiment's enlisted ranks is scanty and inconclusive. The historian Timothy Stapleton, basing his figures on regimental nominal rolls and anecdotal evidence from officers, gives a total of 2,507 rank-and-filers attesting into the RNR. Scholars generally agree that while most of the men were Southern Rhodesian residents, only about a third were originally from the colony. Stapleton estimates that 44.5% of the regiment's enlisted men were Nyasalanders, 29% were Southern Rhodesians, 17.5% were Northern Rhodesians and the rest were from elsewhere. Kalanga soldiers made up 40% of the Southern Rhodesians in the RNR (or around 12% of the whole regiment), a disproportionately large proportion.) By the start of March, about 1,000 recruits were training in Salisbury. Meanwhile, 1RNR was instructed to guard the Igali Pass, near the border with Northern Rhodesia, to prevent a column of Germans from threatening the settlements of Abercorn and Fife. When the Germans slipped through, the Rhodesians were pulled back to a position between the two towns and instructed to defend either one as circumstances dictated. The Germans did not launch an attack, however, instead setting up camp in their own territory at Galula.

The Southern Rhodesian commanders planned to destroy the German column by taking advantage of the regional geography; the Germans had Lake Rukwa to their back, and the rivers Songwe and Saisi on their respective left (eastern) and right flanks, effectively hemming them in if they were attacked. The plan was that elements of 1RNR would hold the Saisi while a battalion of the King's African Rifles (KAR) manned the Songwe; the rest of 1RNR would then push the Germans back towards the lake. However, Tomlinson interpreted his orders as requiring immediate action, and attacked before the two flanking lines were in place on the rivers. The offensive had some successes at first, even though Tomlinson was outnumbered, but the 450 Germans, armed with three Königsberg field guns and 14 machine guns, soon withdrew to the higher ground at St Moritz Mission. The Germans counterattacked over the following week. Colonel R E Murray, who commanded a column of BSAP men about 10 kilometres (6.2 mi) away, did not assist Tomlinson, and 1RNR took great losses while repulsing the attack: 58 RNR men were killed, and the Germans captured three Rhodesian machine guns. Tomlinson was blamed by most for the debacle, but he insisted for years afterwards that he had only been following orders from Murray to hold his ground. He expressed incredulity at Murray's failure to reinforce him. An enquiry into the matter was avoided when Tomlinson was wounded and invalided home soon after the battle.

On 5 April 1917, 1RNR crossed the Songwe River into German East Africa and advanced south-east towards Kitanda. It moved up the winding Lupa River, crossing it at each turn, for 53 days, and by mid-June was 30 kilometres (19 mi) north of its target. When it was then ordered to backtrack north to Rungwe, it covered the 420 kilometres (260 mi) in 16 days. Several scholars highlight the distances marched by the RNR, and comment that their physical endurance must have been remarkable, particularly given the speed at which they moved. "One can only marvel at the hardiness and fortitude of these men who matter-of-factly marched distances unthinkable to modern Western soldiers", the historian Alexandre Binda writes. McLaughlin contrasts the RNR's black troopers with the white soldiers of the 2nd Rhodesia Regiment, commenting that the former proved far more resilient to tropical diseases (though not immune), and amazed white observers by not just adapting to the difficult East African conditions, but often marching 50 kilometres (31 mi) in a day. In June 1917, Sergeant Rita (or Lita), a black non-commissioned officer later described by Tomlinson as "a splendid soldier", received the highest award ever given to an RNR askari, the Distinguished Conduct Medal, "for conspicuous gallantry in action on many occasions. His example and influence with his men is incalculable".

The 1st Battalion harassed the constantly moving German flying column during August and September 1917. Two Military Medals were won by RNR soldiers during this time: Sergeant Northcote rescued a wounded askari under German fire in late August, and a few days later Corporal Suga, himself lightly injured, dragged his wounded commanding officer Lieutenant Booth out of the open and into cover. The 2nd Battalion, comprising Major Jackson at the head of 585 askaris and 75 whites, left Salisbury on 16 September 1917, and joined the front on 16 October, when it arrived at Mbewa on the north-eastern shore of Lake Nyasa, intending to ultimately merge with 1RNR. After 1RNR spent two months garrisoning Wiedhaven and 2RNR underwent further training, the two forces joined on 28 January 1918 (becoming known as the 2nd Rhodesia Native Regiment), and immediately made their way south in pursuit of Lettow-Vorbeck's Germans, who were by now down to an effective strength of less than 2,000, and moving through Portuguese Mozambique.

In late May 1918, the two-year service contracts signed by the original 500 RNR volunteers expired, and the majority of those who had not already been discharged—just under 400 men—went home. While passing through Umtali on their way to Salisbury, the soldiers encountered the RNR's original commanding officer, Lieutenant-Colonel Tomlinson, whom they promptly mobbed, excitedly chanting nkosi, nkosi (which roughly means "chief" in Sindebele). In the capital, the RNR men were met at the railway station by thousands of people, including a number of prominent government, military and religious figures. Chaplin, the territorial administrator, gave a speech in which he applauded the troops for "upholding the good name of Rhodesia" and for having played "no insignificant part in depriving the Germans of their power in Africa".

In Mozambique, the RNR encountered Lettow-Vorbeck's supply column near Mtarika on 22 May 1918. It wiped it out (capturing two German officers, two German askaris, 34 Portuguese askaris and 252 carriers), but as the supply column had been marching between the main German column and its rearguard, Lettow-Vorbeck was then able to attack the RNR from both sides. The contact lasted until darkness fell, and the RNR held its position. Lettow-Vorbeck then moved further south, with the RNR following. This pursuit continued for the rest of the war, with Lettow-Vorbeck avoiding contacts so far as was possible and constantly resupplying his men by briefly occupying isolated towns. The RNR chased the German column for over 3,600 kilometres (2,200 mi) around Mozambique and the eastern districts of Northern Rhodesia, but never caught up with him. (Note: Lettow-Vorbeck was still in the field when the armistice was signed in Europe on 11 November 1918. He learned that the war was over three days later, on the road between the Northern Rhodesian towns of Mpika and Kasama, when he received a telegram from the South African Lieutenant-General Jacob van Deventer. The exact spot where this occurred has been marked since 1953 by the Von Lettow-Vorbeck Memorial. As instructed by the telegram, the German marched his undefeated troops the 250 kilometres (160 mi) north to Abercorn and formally surrendered. It took him 11 days to reach Abercorn, so the ceremonial surrender of Germany's forces in East Africa took place on 25 November 1918, a full two weeks after the European war ended.) After Lettow-Vorbeck formally surrendered at Abercorn on 25 November 1918, the RNR returned to Salisbury, where the men were discharged during 1919. The regiment existed on paper for two more years before it was formally disbanded in February 1921.

== Home front ==
=== Home service and conscription debate ===
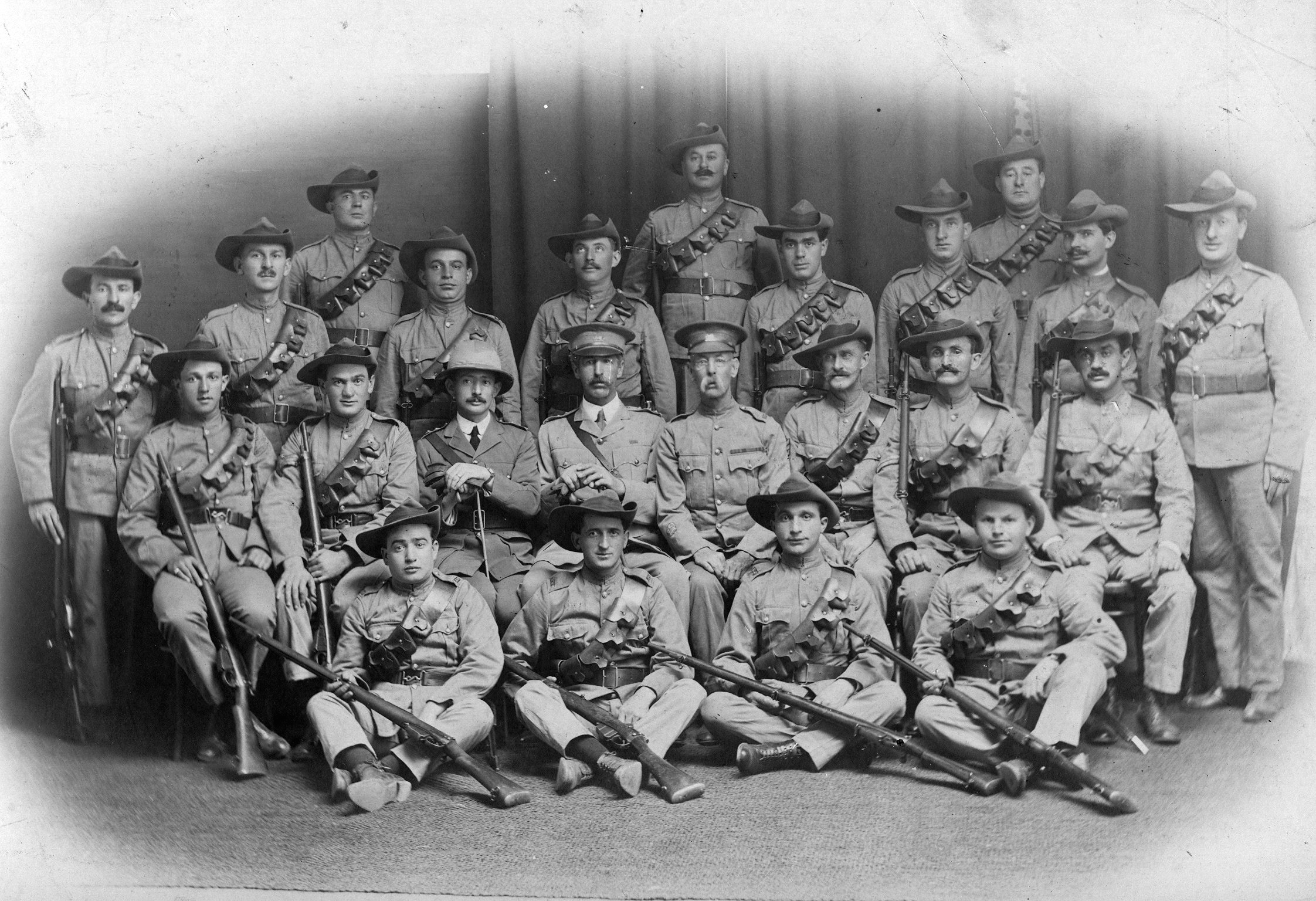
Jewish members of the Rhodesian Reserves, pictured in 1916

Southern Rhodesian troops during World War I were all volunteers. Particularly during the war's early stages, not all male settlers of fighting age were expected to abandon their civilian lives for service abroad. Many of them were in vital industries like mining, and the Company administration did not grant financial allowances to support the families of married soldiers, so at least at first, only bachelors in non-essential positions were generally considered to have any moral obligation to sign up. The 2nd Rhodesia Regiment, raised in early 1915, explicitly barred married men from its ranks to pre-empt the tribulations that might befall their families while they were gone. Men of service age who remained at home were pressured by the national and local press to contribute to local security by joining the Southern Rhodesia Volunteers or the Rhodesian Reserves; editorials told readers that men who failed to do so were not fulfilling their patriotic duty, and warned that conscription might be required if not enough joined up.

The idea of conscription ran contrary to British political tradition, but the sheer scale of the Western Front led to its institution in Britain in January 1916. The Rhodesia Herald and Bulawayo Chronicle newspapers broadcast the news in special editions. While some settlers supported the extension of the same system to white Southern Rhodesians, it was also opposed in many quarters. The British South Africa Company feared that the loss of skilled white workers might jeopardize its mining operations, crucial to the colonial economy, while the Rhodesian Agricultural Union contended that white farmers had to stay on the land for similar reasons. Some, mindful of John Chilembwe's anticolonial uprising in Nyasaland in early 1915, felt that it was necessary to keep a core of male settlers in the colony to guard against a repeat of the Mashona and Matabele rebellions of the 1890s.

By late 1916, most settlers in the colony who were inclined to volunteer had already done so. To free up white manpower, some suggested the recruitment of older men for local service so more of the younger volunteers could go overseas. In 1917, the Chartered Company set up a committee to consider the question of national defense both during the war and thereafter; its report, released in February 1918, described reliance on volunteers as inefficient, and recommended the institution of compulsory service for whites, even after the war (no mention was made of using black troops in the future). The Company published proposals the following month to register all white males aged between 18 and 65 with a view to some form of conscription, but this provoked widespread and vocal dissent, particularly from farmers. In the face of this opposition the administration vacillated until it quietly dropped the idea after the armistice.

=== Economic impact ===
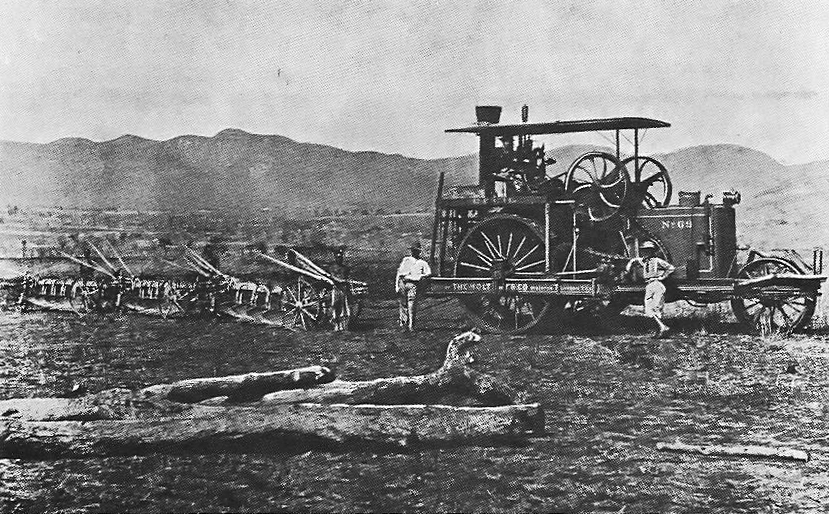
Farming on the Pioneer Citrus Estate near Umtali at the time of the war

The British South Africa Company had reservations about devoting all of Southern Rhodesia's resources to the war effort, in part because of its desire to keep the colonial economy operating. There was indeed tightening of belts in the Rhodesias during the war, but not on the same scale as in Britain. The retail sector suffered, prices for many basic day-to-day items rose sharply, and exports plummeted as much of the white male citizenry went overseas to war, but mining, the industry on which Rhodesia's economic viability hinged, continued to operate successfully, despite occasional difficulties in obtaining manpower. The Company administration posted record outputs of gold and coal during 1916, and began to supply the Empire with the strategic metal ferrochrome. A flurry of new prospecting ventures led to the discovery of another strategic metal, tungsten, near Essexvale in southern Matabeleland in May 1917.

Southern Rhodesia's other main economic arm, farming, performed less strongly during the war, partly because the Chartered Company prioritized the strategically important mines at the behest of British officials. Southern Rhodesian farmers were optimistic at the outbreak of war, surmising that the Empire would become desperate for food and that they would be essentially immune to inflation because they grew their own crops. While these conclusions were on the whole accurate, logistical complications made it difficult for Rhodesian food to be exported, and as in mining there was often a shortage of labor. There were a number of drives to increase agricultural yield with the hope of feeding more people in Britain, but because Southern Rhodesia was so far away it was difficult for the colony to make much of an impact. One of the main culinary contributions the territory made to the British wartime marketplace was Rhodesian butter, which first reached England in February 1917.

The war began to adversely affect the economy in late 1917. The Company threatened petrol rationing in November 1917, and in early 1918 it raised the colonial income tax to help balance the books. By the end of the hostilities the company had spent £2 million on the war effort, most of which was covered by the Rhodesian taxpayers; the Company covered some of the expenditure itself, and also received a small amount of financial aid from the UK government.

=== Propaganda and public opinion ===
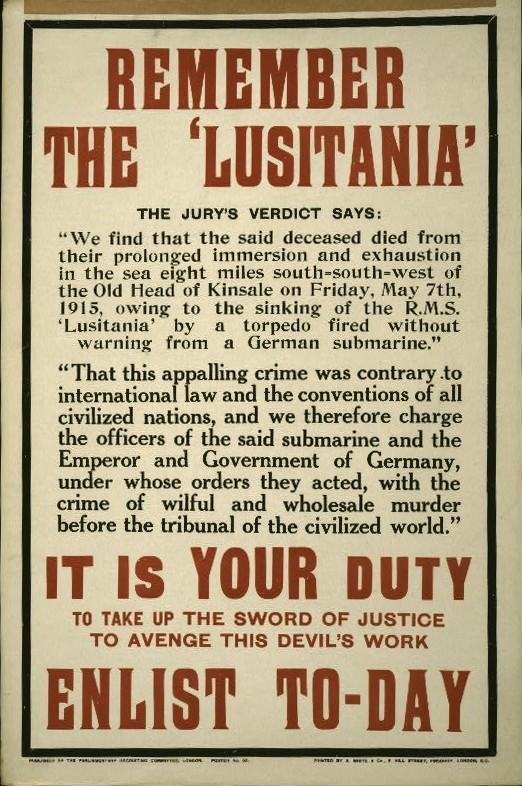
A British propaganda poster urging men to "take up the sword of justice" to avenge the sinking of the RMS Lusitania by a German U-boat

Mass media on both sides in the conflict tried to motivate their respective populations and justify the war's continuation by creating an image of the enemy so grotesque and savage that surrender became unthinkable. Like the major newspapers in Britain, the Rhodesia Herald and the Bulawayo Chronicle became key propaganda tools, regularly printing stories of German atrocities, massacres and other war crimes alongside articles simply entitled "War Stories" that told of British Army soldiers carrying out deeds of Herculean bravery. Anti-German sentiment abounded in the territory throughout the conflict, and periodically intensified, often concurrently with the reporting of particularly unsavory incidents.

During the initial peak of Germanophobia, which lasted the first few months of the conflict, many German and Austrian men of military age who lived in Rhodesia were arrested (officially as "prisoners of war") and sent to internment camps in South Africa. Gertrude Page, one of the colony's most famous novelists, wrote an open letter in response, vouching for the loyalty of a young German in her employ, and received a number of replies accusing her of being unpatriotic. The second period of intensification began following the sinking of the British passenger liner RMS Lusitania by a German U-boat on 7 May 1915. The Rhodesia Herald ran an editorial soon after calling on the Company administration to intern all remaining German and Austrian residents and to close their businesses. A town assembly in Umtali sent the administrator a resolution asking him to confiscate all property in the colony owned by subjects of Germany and Austria within 48 hours "in view of German barbarity". Most of Southern Rhodesia's remaining German and Austrian residents were soon sent to the camps in South Africa.

Further periods of intensified anti-German feeling in the Rhodesias followed the execution by the Germans of the British nurse Edith Cavell in Belgium in October 1915 ("the Crowning Crime", the Bulawayo Chronicle called it), the escalation of bombing raids by German Zeppelins on British cities during 1917, and the British reportage the same year of the Kadaververwertungsanstalt atrocity story—that the Germans supposedly rendered down battlefield corpses from both sides to make products such as nitroglycerine and lubricants.

A small elite of black urbanites, mostly raised and educated at Christian missions, existed in Southern Rhodesia by the time of the war, and these generally identified themselves strongly with settler society and, by extension, the war effort although the vast majority of black people in the colony retained their traditional tribal lifestyles of rural subsistence farming, and for most of them, as McLaughlin comments, the war "could have been fought between aliens from different planets for all their connection with events in Europe". Some felt obliged to "fight for their country", seeing the travails of Rhodesia and the Empire as their own also, but the great bulk of tribal public opinion was detached, seeing the conflict as a "white man's war" that did not concern them. Those who favored the latter line of thinking cared not so much about the conflict itself but more about how its course might affect them specifically. For example, widespread interest was aroused soon after the outbreak of war when rumors began to fly between the rural black communities that the Company planned to conscript them. News of the Maritz Rebellion prompted a fresh rumor among the Matabele that Company officials might confiscate tribal livestock to feed the white troops going south. None of this actually occurred.

The Chartered Company's native commissioners began to fear a possible tribal rebellion during early 1915. Herbert Taylor, the chief native commissioner, believed that foreign missionaries were secretly encouraging rural black people to emulate the Chilembwe revolt in Nyasaland, and telling them (falsely) that the British were exterminating the natives there. There were few actual attempts to topple the administration in Southern Rhodesia, but the Company still took precautions. Aware that Mashona svikiro (spirit mediums) had been instrumental in inciting and leading insurgencies against Company rule during the late 1890s, the native commissioners enacted new legislation designed to imprison any svikiro who gained significant popularity.

The only real threat of a black rebellion in Southern Rhodesia during the war occurred in May 1916, immediately after the Company instructed native commissioners in Matabeleland to start recruiting for the Rhodesia Native Regiment. Company officials attempted to make clear that the RNR comprised volunteers only, and most Matabele chiefs were not unreceptive to the idea—some, including Chief Ndiweni, attempted to encourage enlistment by sending their own sons off to war—but rumours spread in some quarters that black men were going to be involuntarily conscripted wholesale into the unit. Chief Maduna, in Insiza district, briefly threatened insurrection, issuing rifles to 100 men, but he backed down after a few weeks after it became self-evident that conscription was not happening. Some attempted to dissuade potential RNR recruits from signing up, including a black man in Bulawayo who was fined £4 in July 1915 for spreading a false rumor around the city that the British East Africa Transport Corps' black Southern Rhodesian drivers had had their throats cut by the Germans. Matthew Zwimba, founder of the syncretist Church of the White Bird in Mashonaland, received six months' hard labor the following year for advising black men not to join the RNR on the grounds that the British had, he said, committed crimes against God in 1913.

The colony's small Afrikaner community was split on the issue of war. Some supported the United Kingdom out of loyalty to Rhodesia, but others were still bitter about the Anglo-Boer War and showed little interest in fighting the Germans. In the rural areas, where Afrikaner nationalism was strongest, the Germans were perceived by some Boer farmers as potential liberators from British domination. Southern Rhodesian Afrikaners were often accused of undermining the British war effort. While some leaders of the community publicly came out in support of the war and offered to provide troops, others put pressure on Afrikaans-speakers not to volunteer. When recruitment for the Rhodesia Native Regiment began in 1916, there were reports of potential black recruits being urged not to join up by their Afrikaans-speaking employers.

=== Women ===
As is common in frontier societies, the Southern Rhodesian settler community was mostly male: at the time of the First World War, white females were outnumbered by males almost two to one. Because white women were so marriageable and cheap black labor was easily available to handle domestic duties, most female settlers did not work and spent most of their days supervising the household and family. The average white woman in the colony continued to live this kind of life during the war, in marked contrast to her British counterpart, who in many cases went to replace the male factory workers and farm laborers who went to war. In Rhodesia little of this sort occurred: there were no munitions factories, and the idea of women working down the country's mines was not considered practical. Some white farmers' wives took over management of the land in their husbands' absence, but this was quite unusual.

The contribution to the war made by Southern Rhodesia's white female population generally comprised organising and running donation drives, comforts committees and other similar enterprises. They sent the troops "comforts parcels", which contained balaclavas, mittens and scarves that they had knitted, as well as newspapers, soap, food (including cakes and sweets), and minor luxuries. These packages did much to raise the morale of the men, particularly those who were in German captivity. Women were also largely responsible for handling mail between Rhodesian soldiers and their relatives and friends back home. After the armistice, they organized financial assistance for those discharged Southern Rhodesian men in England who could not afford to come home, and arranged visits for those convalescing in English hospitals.

As in Britain, some Southern Rhodesian women during the war presented men not wearing military uniform with white feathers (symbolising cowardice). This campaign often went awry, as many of the men presented with the feathers were not in fact shirking from service. In 1916, hoping to save them further harassment, the Rhodesia Herald and other newspapers began publishing lists of men who had volunteered only to be deemed medically unfit by the army doctors.

Black women played a minor role in units such as the Rhodesia Native Regiment, accompanying the black soldiers into the operational area and performing domestic tasks like washing and cooking. Many of these were local East African women who had formed attachments with RNR soldiers. Officers tolerated the presence of these women in the interest of morale, aware that attempting to take them away from the men would probably lead to mutiny.

=== Donations and funds ===
Southern Rhodesian settlers set up a number of wartime funds, including funds to aid war victims, funds to provide the troops with tobacco and other supplies, funds to assist orphans and widows, funds to buy aeroplanes, and others. These raised about £200,000 in all. Much of this went to the Prince of Wales National Relief Fund in Britain, which was founded when the war started; Southern Rhodesian branches of the fund were promptly organized in several towns and ultimately consolidated into the Rhodesian War Relief Fund. This body donated 25% of its receipts to the Prince of Wales Fund and 75% to local concerns.

The Tobacco Fund, set up in September 1914, was particularly successful. Public donors bought Southern Rhodesian tobacco, cigarettes and pipe tobacco to send to the British forces. This was intended not only to comfort the troops, but also to advertise the prospect of post-war emigration to Rhodesia. The labels on the tobacco tins depicted a map of Africa with the sun shining on Rhodesia, accompanied by the slogan "The World's Great Sunspot". In a similar vein, "Sunspot" was the name given to the Rhodesian cigarettes that British soldiers received. During the war, British and colonial soldiery collectively chewed and smoked 59,955 two-ounce (57 g) tins of donated Southern Rhodesian tobacco, 80,584 two-ounce tins of equivalent pipe tobacco, and 4,004,000 Sunspot cigarettes (in packs of 10). Another similar undertaking saw six tons (roughly 6,100 kg) of local citrus fruits sent to wounded British Army personnel in South Africa and England.

Starting in July 1915, Southern Rhodesians raised funds to buy airplanes for the Royal Flying Corps. The colony ultimately bought three aircraft, each of which cost £1,500—they were named Rhodesia Nos. 1, 2 and 3. Residents of the town of Gatooma also set up their own drive, which funded the purchase of two more planes, Gatooma Nos. 1 and 2.

The black elite in the towns donated to the settlers' patriotic funds and organisations, and also set up their own. A war fundraising tea organized by black Salisburians in early March 1915 boasted entertainment in the form of a black choir, as well as the presence of Taylor and a junior native commissioner, each of whom gave speeches in English, Sindebele and Shona. Rural black people, by contrast, did not generally understand the concept of donating money to war funds, and misinterpreted encouragement to do so as being threatened with a new tax. When the Matabele chief Gambo began collecting war donations from his people in early 1915, also urging other chiefs to do the same, he took care to thoroughly explain the war fund's purpose and the voluntary nature of contributing, but some villagers still misunderstood and came to believe they would have livestock confiscated if they did not give money. The Company ultimately sent officials around the countryside to clarify the matter.

The Kalanga, a small community in the south-west that provided a disproportionately large number of volunteers for the Rhodesia Native Regiment, also proved conspicuous for their extremely generous financial donations; in June 1915, they collectively donated £183, "a staggering sum", the historian Timothy Stapleton comments, to the Prince of Wales Fund.

=== Flu pandemic ===
The 1918 flu pandemic, often referred to at the time as "Spanish flu", spread quickly into Southern Rhodesia from South Africa in October 1918. A week after the first case was reported in Salisbury, over 1,000 people were infected. Public buildings in the towns were converted into makeshift hospital wards, appeals were put out for trained nurses to attend the sick, and soup kitchens were set up to feed children whose parents were too ill to look after them. Newspapers in the colony published basic instructions on how to deal with the disease. The mine compounds, where hundreds of black laborers lived and worked together in close proximity, were worst affected. The whole country was ultimately infected, with even the most remote villages reporting deaths. Many members of the Rhodesia Native Regiment were infected, and 76 of them died from the disease having survived the war. By the time the pandemic had ended in Southern Rhodesia around mid-November 1918, thousands had been killed.

== End of the war, aftermath and statistics ==
News of the armistice on 11 November 1918 reached Southern Rhodesia the same day, and was announced to the town of Salisbury by the repeated blowing of the klaxon at the Castle Brewery. Hysterical street parties started almost immediately, and in the evening the people let off fireworks and lit a huge bonfire on Salisbury kopje. Bulawayo celebrated with a street party that continued uninterrupted for over 48 hours. Smaller towns marked the armistice with their own celebratory functions and events.

Once the frivolities had ended, minds turned to post-war policy, and particularly how soldiers returning from Europe would be reintegrated into society. The company had already, in 1916, set aside 250,000 acres (100,000 ha) of farmland to be given free of charge to white war veterans. In early 1919 it set up a government department to help returning men find work. Many former soldiers failed to find jobs, and some remained unemployed for years after they returned home. Some of the more seriously wounded from the European theatre never came back at all, instead remaining in England because of the better medical facilities and public benefits. Demobilized Western Front veterans began to arrive back in Rhodesia in January 1919, and continued to do so for nearly a year afterwards. On 30 May 1919, the Southern Rhodesian Legislative Council passed a resolution thanking the territory's veterans.

This council, on behalf of the government and people of Southern Rhodesia, records its grateful thanks to the men of the Territory who took part in the Great War; its deep appreciation of the services they have rendered; and its admiration of their bearing and conduct. It expresses its sympathy with those who have suffered and the relatives of those who have made the supreme sacrifice, and welcomes home those who, having completed their services, are returning.

— The Southern Rhodesian Legislative Council

The Southern Rhodesian tribal chiefs collectively sent their own statement to King George V.

We wish to say that, when the king called upon us for help, we sent our young men, who fought and died beside the English, and we claim that our blood and that of the English are now one.

— The chiefs of Southern Rhodesia

Proportional to white population, Southern Rhodesia had contributed more personnel to the British armed forces in World War I than any of the Empire's dominions or colonies, and more than Britain itself. About 40% of white males in the colony, 5,716 men, put on uniform, with 1,720 doing so as commissioned officers. Black Southern Rhodesians were represented by the 2,507 soldiers who made up the Rhodesia Native Regiment, the roughly 350 who joined the British East Africa Transport Corps, British South Africa Police Mobile Column and South African Native Labour Corps, and the few dozen black scouts who served with the 1st and 2nd Rhodesia Regiments in South-West and East Africa. Southern Rhodesians killed in action or on operational duty numbered over 800, counting all races together—more than 700 of the colony's white servicemen died, while the Rhodesia Native Regiment's black soldiers suffered 146 fatalities.

== Legacy ==
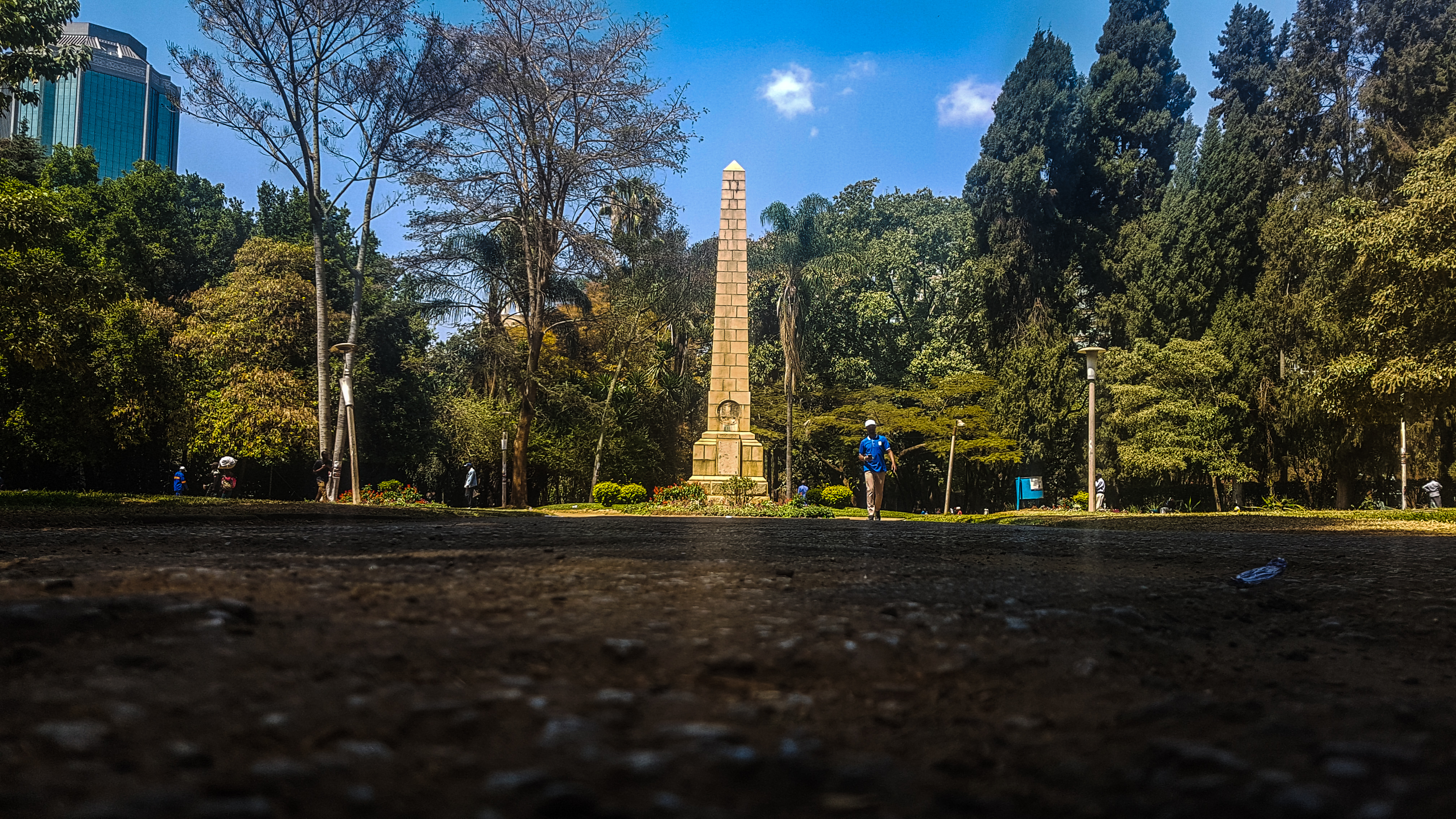
The obelisk in Harare Gardens

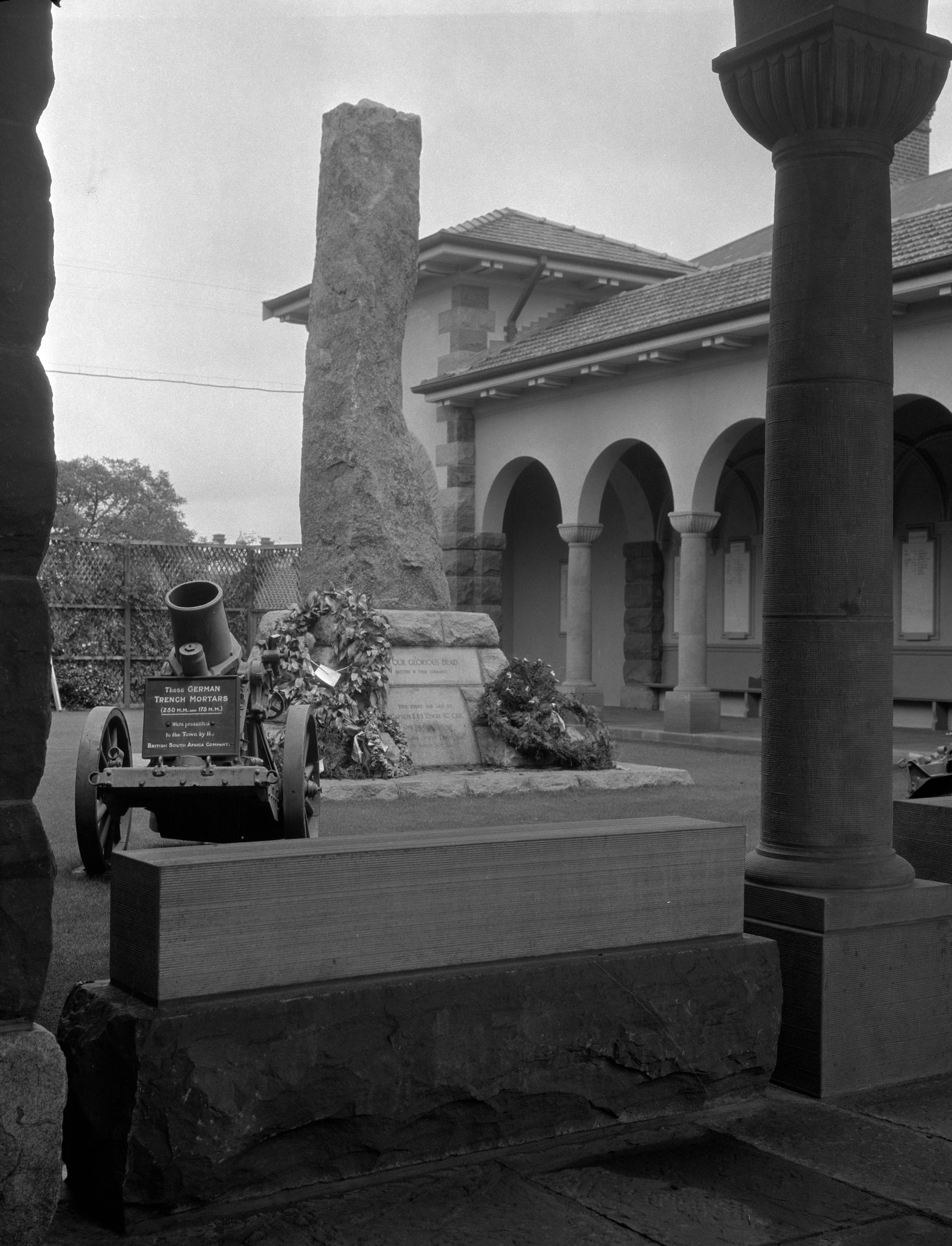
The Bulawayo Cenotaph

Accounts of white Southern Rhodesian soldiers' wartime experiences started to be published in the 1920s. The conflict became a key entry in many national histories, though the role played by black troops was often minimised in these accounts. The colony's wartime contributions became a source of great pride for much of the Southern Rhodesian white community, as well as for some black Africans; whites were particularly proud that they had had the highest enlistment rate in the British Empire during the war. A national war memorial, a stone obelisk, 50 feet (15 m) high, was funded by public donations and built in Salisbury in 1919. Soldiers, one black and one white, were depicted in relief on plaques on each side; the inscriptions below read "1914–1918—We fought and died for our King." Five years later, Lieutenant-Colonel J A Methuen organized the erection on a kopje near Umtali of a stone cross, 30 feet (9.1 m) tall, to memorialise the country's fallen black soldiers. This monument remains to this day, as does the bronze plaque at its foot, which reads "To the Glory of God and in Memory of Africans Who Fell. 1914–1918."

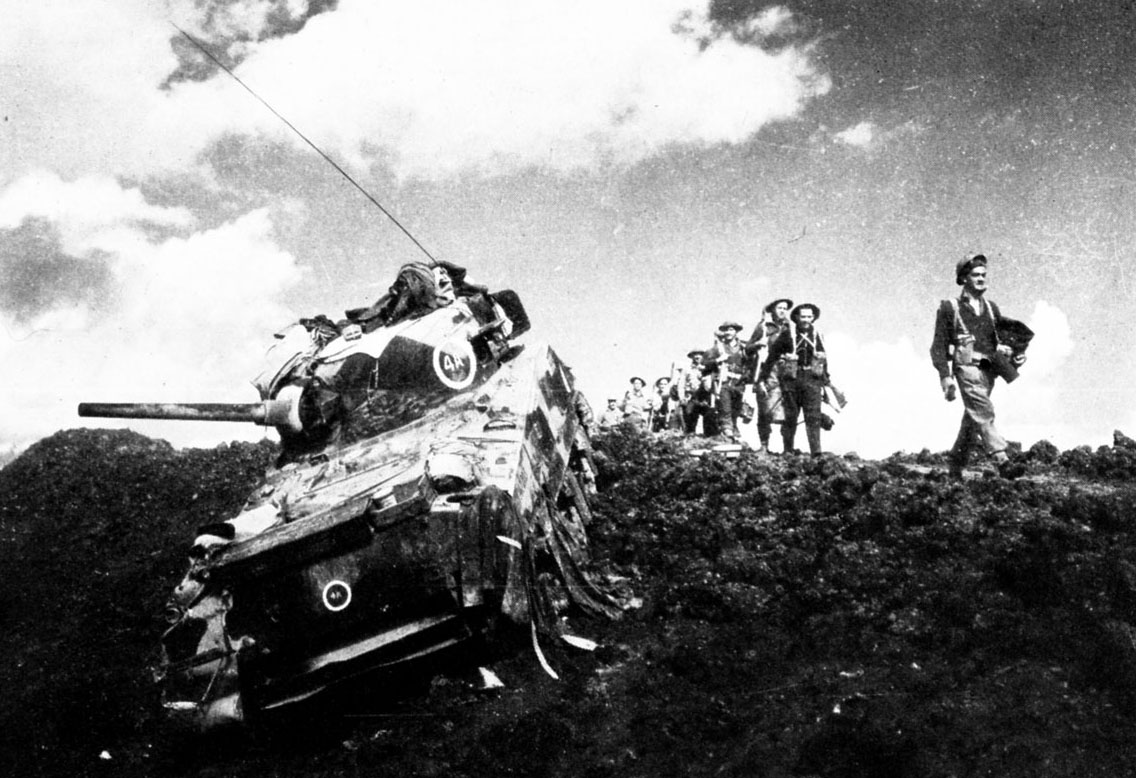
A Southern Rhodesian tank in Italy during World War II, 1944

Southern Rhodesia's contributions to the Imperial war effort helped it to become regarded by Britain as more mature and deserving of responsible government, which Whitehall granted in 1923. The territory was made a self-governing colony, just short of full dominion status. (Note: Responsible government was granted following the 1922 government referendum, which offered voters a choice between joining the Union of South Africa at the termination of the British South Africa Company's charter, or instead becoming a separate self-governing colony. The latter option prevailed with just under 60% of the vote. Company rule endured a few more months in Northern Rhodesia, ending in early 1924 when control transferred to the Colonial Office in London.) Charged with its own defense, Salisbury introduced the selective conscription of white males in 1926, and reformed the Rhodesia Regiment the following year. The territory's association with the King's Royal Rifle Corps endured in the form of affiliation between the KRRC and the Rhodesia Regiment's new incarnation, which adopted aspects of the KRRC uniform and a similar regimental insignia. The new Rhodesia Regiment was granted the original's World War I battle honors and colors by George V in 1929.

In World War II, Southern Rhodesia again enthusiastically stood behind the UK, symbolically declaring war on Germany in support of Britain before any other colony or dominion. Over 26,000 Southern Rhodesians served in the Second World War, making the colony once more the largest contributor of manpower, proportional to white population, in all of the British Empire and Commonwealth. As in World War I, Southern Rhodesians were distributed in small groups throughout the British Army, Royal Navy and Royal Air Force. Dedicated Rhodesian platoons again served in the KRRC, and the Rhodesian African Rifles, raised in 1940, were in many ways a resurrection of the Rhodesia Native Regiment. (Note: Like the RNR, the Rhodesian African Rifles comprised black soldiers and warrant officers led by white officers; it included a number of ex-RNR personnel, and reprised several RNR traditions. It took part in the Burma Campaign, and successfully requested permission to emblazon its regimental colours with the RNR's World War I battle honours in 1952.) Military aviation, already associated with the colony following the First World War, became a great Southern Rhodesian tradition during the Second, with the colony providing No. 44, No. 237 and No. 266 Squadrons and other personnel to the Royal Air Force, as well as training in Southern Rhodesia for 8,235 Allied airmen.

By the 1960s, Southern Rhodesians' service on Britain's behalf in the World Wars, particularly the Second, was an integral part of the colony's national psyche. The territory had also latterly contributed to British counter-insurgency operations in Malaya, Aden and Cyprus, as well as Operation Vantage in Kuwait. The colonial government's Unilateral Declaration of Independence in 1965 was deliberately made on 11 November, Armistice Day, in an attempt to emphasize the territory's prior war record on Britain's behalf. The proclamation was signed at 11:00 local time, during the customary two-minute silence to remember the fallen.

After the country's reconstitution and recognized independence as Zimbabwe in 1980, Robert Mugabe's administration pulled down many monuments and plaques making reference to the fallen of the First and Second World Wars, perceiving them as reminders of white minority rule and colonialism that went against what the modern state stood for. This view was partly rooted in the association of these memorials with those commemorating the British South Africa Company's dead of the Matabele Wars, as well as those memorializing members of the Rhodesian Security Forces killed during the Bush War of the 1970s. Many Zimbabweans subsequently saw their nation's involvement in the World Wars as a consequence of colonial rule that had more to do with the white community than the indigenous black majority, and most had little interest in its contributions to those conflicts.

The national war memorial obelisk still stands, but the relief sculptures and inscriptions have been removed. The stone cross monument near Mutare (as Umtali is now called) is one of the few memorials that remains intact and in its place, atop what is now called Cross Kopje; its meaning has been largely forgotten. The Cenotaph in Bulawayo, unveiled in 1925 by Edward, Prince of Wales, commemorates Southern Rhodesians who served in the First World War and later conflicts, including the Bush War.

A number of memorials in Zimbabwe are maintained by the Commonwealth War Graves Commission.

== Sources ==
=== Websites ===
- "British South Africa Company (BSAC, BSACO, or BSA Company)". Encyclopædia Britannica Online. Chicago, Illinois: Encyclopædia Britannica, Inc.

=== Newspaper and journal articles ===
- Ferris, N S (1959). "Military Pot-Pourri: A Rhodesian Green Jacket Looks Back". The King's Royal Rifle Corps Chronicle. Winchester: Warren & Son: 111–118. OCLC 756216787.
- Gore-Browne, Stewart, ed. (1954). "The Chambeshi Memorial". The Northern Rhodesia Journal. II (5). Lusaka: Northern Rhodesia Society: 81–84. ISSN 0549-9674.
- House, John (1976). "Aviation in Rhodesia". Rhodesia Calls. Salisbury: Rhodesia National Tourist Board: 33–45. OCLC 4079878.
- McAdam, J (1967). "Pat Judson: First Rhodesian-born Airman" (PDF). Rhodesiana. 16. Salisbury: The Rhodesiana Society: 1–16. ISSN 0556-9605.
- Moorcraft, Paul (1990). "Rhodesia's War of Independence". History Today. 40 (9). London: History Today Ltd. ISSN 0018-2753.

Bibliography

- Binda, Alexandre (November 2007). Heppenstall, David (ed.). Masodja: The History of the Rhodesian African Rifles and its forerunner the Rhodesian Native Regiment. Johannesburg: 30° South Publishers. ISBN 978-1-920143-03-9.
- Brelsford, W V, ed. (1960). Handbook to the Federation of Rhodesia and Nyasaland (First ed.). London: Cassell. OCLC 503844634.
- Chanock, Martin (1977). Unconsummated Union: Britain, Rhodesia and South Africa, 1900–45 (First ed.). Manchester: Manchester University Press. ISBN 978-0-7190-0634-0.
- Chant, Christopher (May 1988). The Handbook of British Regiments. London: Routledge. ISBN 978-0-415-00241-7.
- Cormack, Andrew; Cormack, Peter (March 2001). British Air Forces 1914–18 (2) (First ed.). Oxford: Osprey Publishing. ISBN 978-1-84176-002-5.
- Corum, James S (2008). "The RAF in Imperial Defence, 1919–1956". In Kennedy, Greg (ed.). Imperial Defence: The Old World Order, 1856–1956. London: Routledge. pp. 152–175. ISBN 978-0-415-35595-7.
- Farey, Pat; Spicer, Mark (2008). Sniping: An Illustrated History (First ed.). Minneapolis: Zenith Press. ISBN 978-0-7603-3717-2.
- Franks, Norman (April 2000). Nieuport Aces of World War I. Oxford: Osprey Publishing. ISBN 978-1-85532-961-4.
- Gale, William Daniel (1973). The Years Between 1923–1973: Half a Century of Responsible Government in Rhodesia. Salisbury: H C P Andersen. OCLC 224687202.
- Gale, William Daniel (1974). History of Coghlan, Welsh & Guest. Salisbury: Coghlan, Welsh & Guest. OCLC 4465148.
- Gann, Lewis H (1969) [1964]. A History of Northern Rhodesia: Early Days to 1953. New York: Humanities Press. OCLC 46853.
- Gibbons, Floyd (1927). The Red Knight of Germany: The Story of Baron von Richthofen, Germany's Great War Bird. Garden City, New York: Garden City Publishing. ISBN 978-0-405-12167-8.
- Hodder-Williams, Richard (1983). White Farmers in Rhodesia, 1890–1965: a History of the Marandellas District. London: Macmillan Publishers. ISBN 978-0-333-27237-4.
- Hutton, Edward, ed. (1917) [1915]. A Brief History of the King's Royal Rifle Corps, 1755 to 1915 (Second ed.). Winchester: Warren & Son. OCLC 558551241.
- Jackson, Ashley (2006). The British Empire and the Second World War (First ed.). London & New York: Continuum International Publishing Group. ISBN 978-0-8264-4049-5.
- Keppel-Jones, Arthur (1983). Rhodes and Rhodesia: The White Conquest of Zimbabwe, 1884–1902. Montreal, Quebec and Kingston, Ontario: McGill-Queen's University Press. ISBN 978-0-7735-0534-6.
- Liddell Hart, Basil H (1970) [1930]. History of the First World War (Fourth ed.). London: Cassell. ISBN 0-304-93653-7.
- MacDonald, J F (1976) [1947]. The War History of Southern Rhodesia 1939–1945. Volume 1. Bulawayo: Books of Rhodesia. ISBN 978-0-86920-138-1.
- MacDonald, J F (1976) [1950]. The War History of Southern Rhodesia 1939–1945. Volume 2. Bulawayo: Books of Rhodesia. ISBN 978-0-86920-140-4.
- McLaughlin, Peter (1980). Ragtime Soldiers: the Rhodesian Experience in the First World War. Bulawayo: Books of Zimbabwe. ISBN 0-86920-232-4.
- Nowarra, Heinz J; Brown, Kimbrough S; Robertson, Bruce (1964) [1959]. Von Richthofen and the Flying Circus (Third ed.). Letchworth: Harleyford Publishing. OCLC 495260263.
- Probert, Henry (August 2006). "Bomber" Harris: His Life and Times. London: Greenhill Books. ISBN 978-1-85367-691-8.
- Radford, M P (1994). Service Before Self: the History, Badges and Insignia of the Security Forces of the Rhodesias and Nyasaland, 1890–1980. Wellington, Somerset: Mark Radford. ISBN 978-0-9524472-0-7.
- Schwarz, Bill (2011). The White Man's World (First ed.). Oxford: Oxford University Press. ISBN 978-0-19-929691-0.
- Shores, Christopher; Franks, Norman; Guest, Russell (October 1990). Above the Trenches: A Complete Record of the Fighter Aces and Units of the British Empire Air Forces, 1915–1920. London: Grub Street. ISBN 978-0-948817-19-9.
- Stapleton, Timothy (2006). No Insignificant Part: The Rhodesia Native Regiment in the East Africa Campaign of the First World War. Waterloo, Ontario: Wilfrid Laurier University Press. ISBN 978-0-88920-498-0.
- Strachan, Hew (February 2003). The First World War, Volume I: To Arms. Oxford: Oxford University Press. ISBN 978-0-19-160834-6.
- Tawse Jollie, Ethel (1971) [1924]. The Real Rhodesia. Bulawayo: Books of Rhodesia. OCLC 772131.
- Uys, Ian (1991). Rollcall: The Delville Wood Story. Germiston: Uys Publishers. ISBN 978-0-9583173-1-3.
- Van der Byl, Piet (1971). From Playgrounds to Battlefields. Volume 1. Cape Town: Howard Timmins. ISBN 978-0-86978-002-2.
- Wake, Hereward; Deedes, William F (1949). Swift and Bold: the Story of the King's Royal Rifle Corps in the Second World War, 1939–1945. Aldershot: Gale & Polden. OCLC 558551278.
- Walker, Eric A, ed. (1963). The Cambridge History of the British Empire, Volume Four (Second ed.). Cambridge: Cambridge University Press. OCLC 560778129.
- Willson, F M G, ed. (1963). Source Book of Parliamentary Elections and Referenda in Southern Rhodesia, 1898–1962. Salisbury: Department of Government, University College of Rhodesia and Nyasaland. OCLC 219295658.
- Wood, J R T (June 2005). So Far And No Further! Rhodesia's Bid For Independence During the Retreat From Empire 1959–1965. Victoria, British Columbia: Trafford Publishing. ISBN 978-1-4120-4952-8.
- Rhodesia and the War, 1914–1917: A Comprehensive Illustrated Record of Rhodesia's Part in the Great War. Salisbury: Art Printing Works. 1918. OCLC 38773295.
- The City of Salisbury: Official Guide. Cape Town: R Beerman Publishers. 1952. OCLC 2884679.
