= The Cenotaph, Bulawayo =

War memorial in Bulawayo, Zimbabwe

The Cenotaph
- Zimbabwe
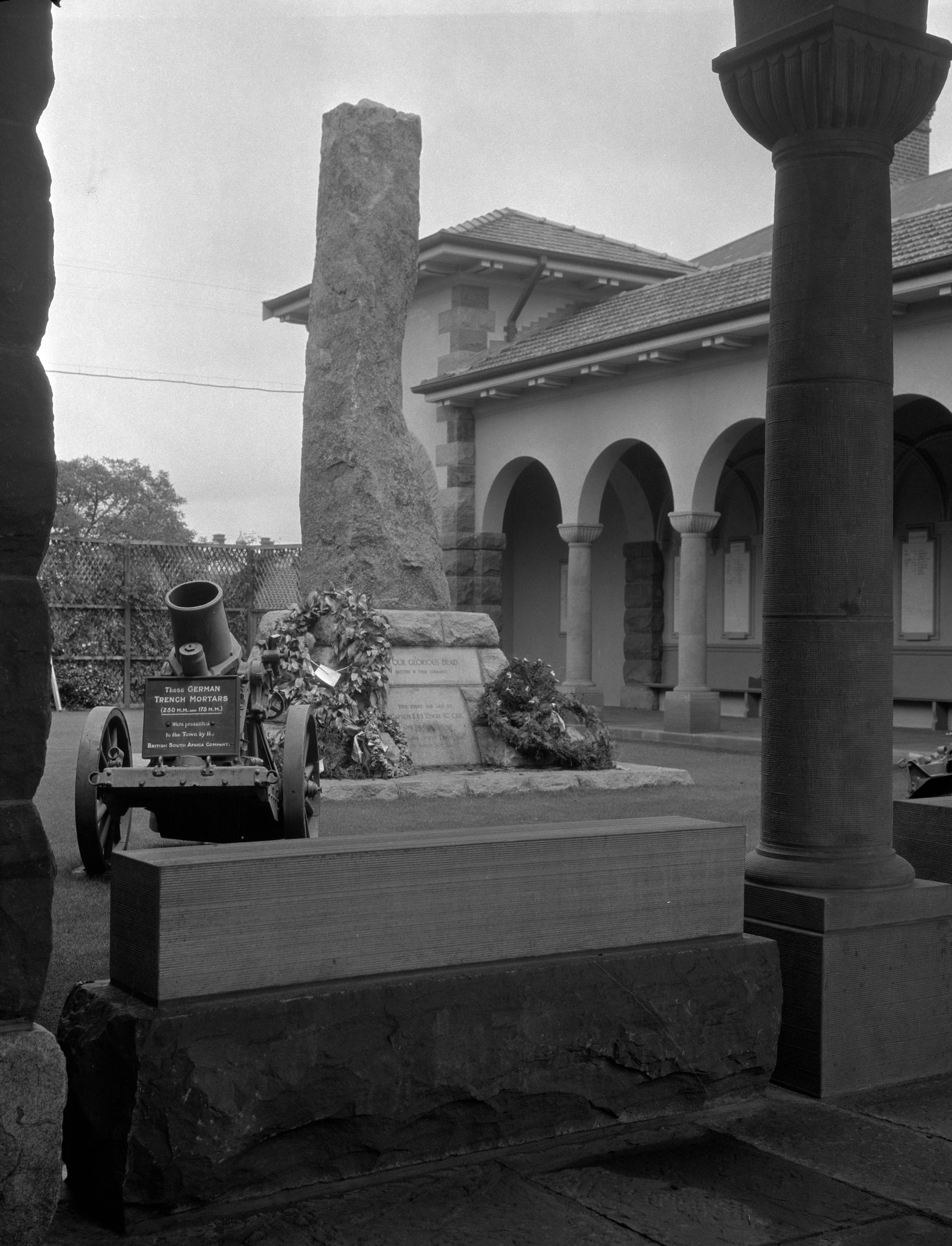
- The Cenotaph in 1924
- For the war dead of Southern Rhodesia
- Established: 30 March 1921
- Unveiled: 1925
- Location: 20°09′13.9″S 28°34′55.5″E; Bulawayo Post Office, Bulawayo, Zimbabwe
- "To Our Glorious Dead"

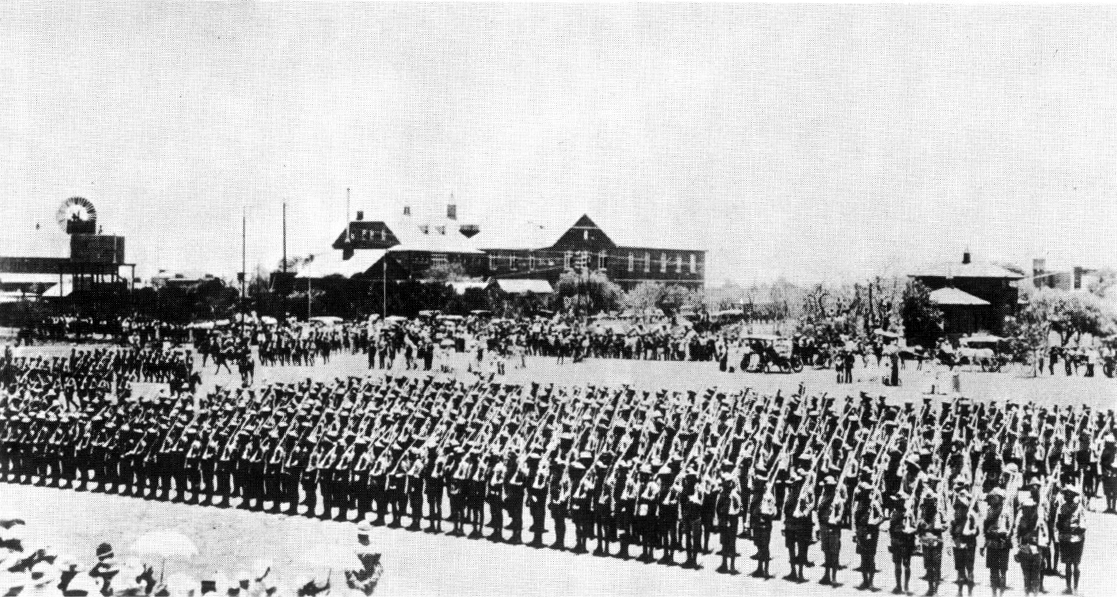
The 1st Rhodesia Regiment on parade in Bulawayo, 1914

The Cenotaph (also called the Bulawayo Cenotaph or the Matabeleland War Memorial) is a war memorial in the city of Bulawayo, Zimbabwe, commemorating personnel who died in the world wars and subsequent conflicts. Located in the gardens of the Bulawayo Post Office, it was dedicated "To Our Glorious Dead" in 1921, but was later unveiled by Edward, Prince of Wales (later King Edward VIII) in 1925.

Plaques lining the veranda list many Southern Rhodesians who fell in conflicts, principally the First World War and the Second World War, whether in the Southern Rhodesian forces, the British South Africa Police, the South African forces or various imperial forces. Personnel who died in the Malayan Emergency of 1957 and in Rhodesia itself during the Bush War are also inscribed.

== History ==
=== Creation and dedications ===
The granite pillar used to form the Cenotaph came from the Matobo Hills. A stone plaque – bearing "To Our Glorious Dead" – was laid on 30 March 1921. Subsequently, in 1925, the monument was unveiled by the Prince of Wales during his tour of Southern Africa; it was draped in a Union Jack, which was then pulled off.

In 1952, a memorial was unveiled in the surrounding cloister to recognise Matabeleland inhabitants who died in the First World War. Another memorial, recognising those who fell in the Second World War and in Malaya, was dedicated in 1970 by President Clifford Dupont.

=== Ceremonies ===
A 13 November 1967 article in the Chronicle, republished on the same date in 2017, records that year's Remembrance Sunday ceremony. Members of ex-service organisations, the Rhodesia Legion, the Memorable Order of Tin Hats, detachments from the Rhodesian African Rifles, other regiments and reserves, cadets and sea cadets paraded at the Cenotaph. After a sermon, wreaths were laid by numerous individuals and entities, including government and military dignitaries, the Royal West African Frontier Forces, the Jewish ex-Servicemen's Organisation, the Rhodesian Women's ex-Service League, Rhodesia Railways, the Royal Engineers, the Red Cross, and others.

Another Remembrance Sunday account, from 10 November 1975, was republished in 2025:

A piper of the Northlea Pipe Band played a lament.

The wreath-laying was preceded by two minutes’ silence — on the stroke of 9 a.m.—and the sounding of the Last Post by the band of the Corps of Signals, who also played the National Anthem.

The Rev. L. E. Gunter, chaplain to the Rhodesia Legion, led prayers and gave a short sermon.

These services took place during the Rhodesian Bush War. The 1967 sermon reflected on the nature of war, with the Reverend AG Leask saying that "sacrifices had been made and those who had given their lives were honoured, but the world was no nearer peace."

=== 21st century ===
The Cenotaph was renovated in 2017. In 2019, plans were reputedly afoot to expand its scope to cover all who had fallen in service of Zimbabwe.

The surrounding gardens are a popular spot amongst Bulawayans, who rest, breakfast and lunch around the Cenotaph. A 2019 article published in the Sunday News called it "a good place to relax" whilst learning about history.

== See also ==
- Southern Rhodesia in World War I
- Southern Rhodesia in World War II
- Southern Rhodesian military involvement in the Malayan Emergency
- Cenotaph
