= Southern Rhodesian military involvement in the Malayan Emergency =

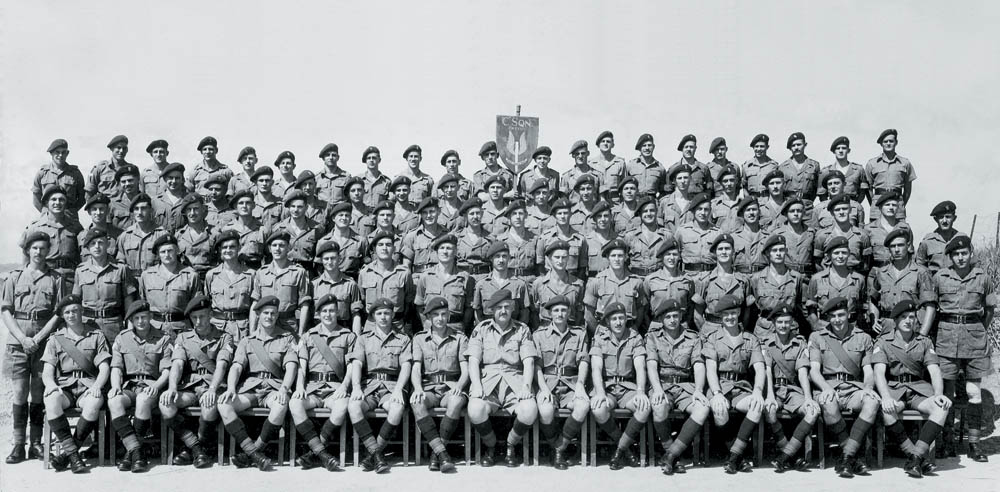
"C" Squadron, the all-Southern Rhodesian unit of the Special Air Service (SAS), in Malaya in 1953

Southern Rhodesia, (Note: Renamed Zimbabwe in 1980.) then a self-governing colony of the United Kingdom, sent two military units to fight with the Commonwealth armed forces in the Malayan Emergency of 1948–60, which pitted the Commonwealth against the Malayan National Liberation Army (MNLA), the military arm of the Malayan Communist Party. For two years, starting in March 1951, white Southern Rhodesian volunteers made up "C" Squadron of the Special Air Service (SAS). The Rhodesian African Rifles, in which black rank-and-filers and warrant officers were led by white officers, then served in Malaya from 1956 to 1958.

Of the hundreds of Southern Rhodesians who served in Malaya, eight were killed. "C" Squadron, which was formed especially to serve in Malaya, was the first SAS unit from a British colony or dominion. Several veterans of the conflict, Peter Walls and John Hickman among them, subsequently held key positions in the Rhodesian Security Forces during the Bush War of the 1970s. One former member of C Squadron named Ronald Reid-Daly went on to found the Selous Scouts.

== Background and outbreak of war ==
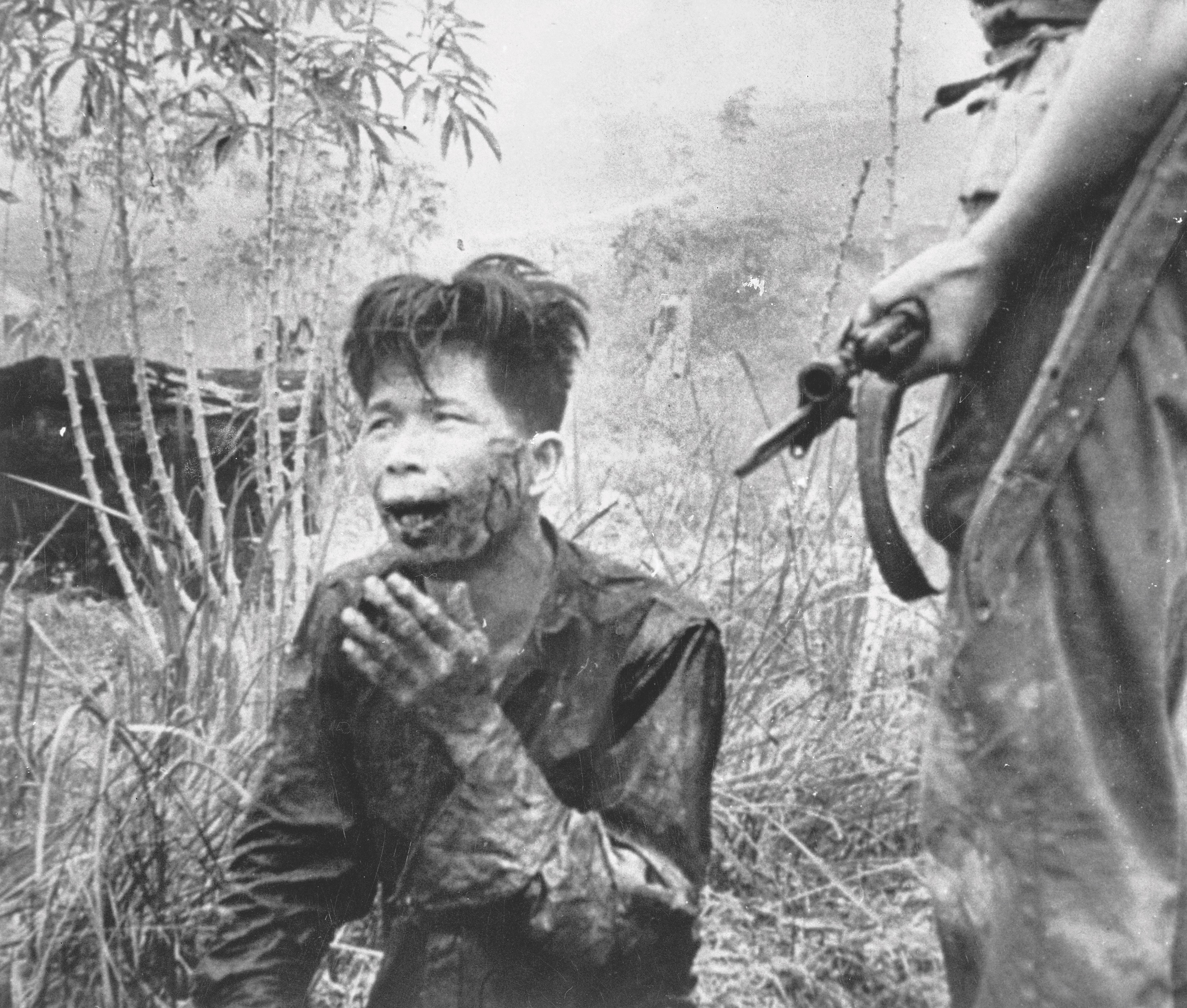
In this 1952 photograph, a communist guerrilla is held at gunpoint following his capture by Commonwealth forces

The Malayan Emergency was a guerrilla war between the Federation of Malaya—a protectorate of Britain until August 1957, and part of the Commonwealth of Nations thereafter—and the Malayan National Liberation Army (MNLA), the armed wing of the Malayan Communist Party (MCP). The MNLA sought to topple the Malayan government and force the British out, while the Commonwealth worked to prevent this. The conflict had its roots in the Second World War, in which groups of local ethnic Chinese fought alongside Britain's limited forces in the country against the occupying Imperial Japanese; these Malayan Chinese subscribed to communist political thinking, and called themselves the Malayan Peoples' Anti-Japanese Army.

Soon after Japan was defeated, the communist fighters renamed themselves the Malayan National Liberation Army, and began to agitate against British rule. Using the arms that Britain had given them—which they had cached, and then subsequently retrieved—they formed themselves into eight regiments, and began a campaign of Maoist-style rural subversion, their intent being to politicise the villagers and gain popular support, which they could then use to take control of Malayan cities. In March 1948, the MCP called on the Malayan people to rise up against the British. Three months later, on 16 June, MNLA guerrillas killed three British rubber plantation managers in Perak province. The British High Commissioner in Malaya, Sir Edward Gent, declared a state of emergency two days afterwards, marking the beginning of the Malayan Emergency.

In addition to British and Malayan units and personnel, the Commonwealth forces in Malaya included Australians, New Zealanders, Gurkhas, Fijians, Nyasalanders, and Northern and Southern Rhodesians. Southern Rhodesia had been self-governing since 1923. It ran its own affairs in most matters, including defence, but it was still constitutionally bound to Whitehall insofar as foreign affairs were concerned. The Southern Rhodesian government was therefore able to exercise a large degree of independence militarily, though diplomatically it came under the British flag.

== "C" Squadron, Special Air Service (1951–53) ==
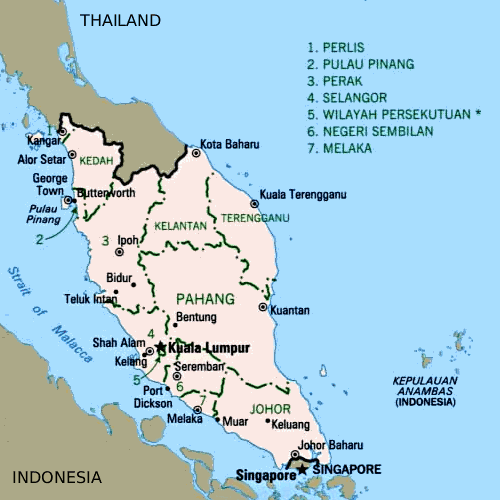
The Federation of Malaya

The Special Air Service (SAS) commando unit was formed by the British Army in 1941, during the North African campaign of the Second World War. Including some Southern Rhodesians in its ranks, it served for the rest of the conflict, also operating in Italy and on the European Western Front. It was disbanded by the British government in October 1945, and reinstituted in 1950 to serve in the Korean War. The situation in Korea had changed by the end of its three-month training period, however, and it was sent to Malaya instead. There it was placed under the command of a British officer, Major Mike Calvert.

Early the following year, Calvert travelled to Southern Rhodesia on a recruitment visit. Roughly 1,000 white Southern Rhodesians, SAS veterans among them, volunteered to go to Malaya; from these, about 100 were chosen to form an all-Southern Rhodesian unit. This was the first SAS squadron from a British colony or dominion. Led by the 24-year-old Temporary Captain Peter Walls, the volunteers arrived in Malaya in March 1951. Walls was promoted to major soon after he and his men disembarked at Singapore. The SAS already had two Squadrons, "A" and "B", so the Southern Rhodesians became "C" Squadron, known more informally as the Rhodesian SAS.

Engaged largely in counter-insurgency warfare, the Southern Rhodesians became well-drilled in the relevant principles and doctrines. They noticeably bolstered the hitherto thinly spread ranks of the SAS in Malaya, and performed strongly in the eyes of their superiors, though British Major C L "Dare" Newell believed that their attitude towards "the aborigines" was colder than that of the British soldiers. Barbara Cole, who wrote a history of the Rhodesian SAS, says by contrast that the Rhodesians became close friends with the Fijians they served alongside, and spent far more time socialising with black and mixed-race soldiers off-duty than their British counterparts did.

In March 1953, after serving their required two years in Malaya, the men of "C" Squadron returned home. They were replaced in 1955 by a squadron from New Zealand. Three members of "C" Squadron—Sergeant O H Ernst, and Corporals J B Davies and V E Visagie—were killed while in Malaya. For his services during the emergency, Walls was awarded an MBE.

== Rhodesian African Rifles (1956–58) ==
=== Arrival in Malaya ===
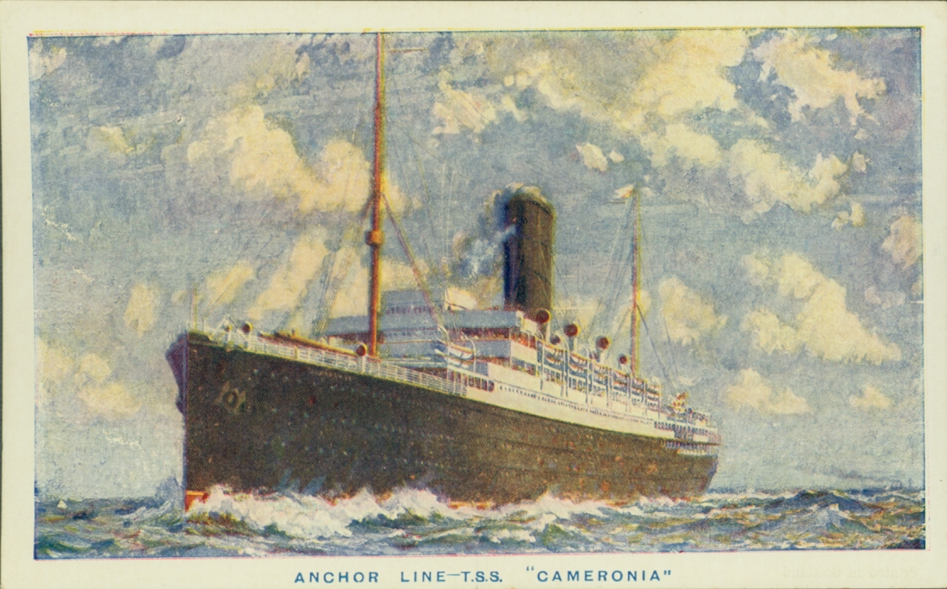
SS Empire Clyde, on which most of the Rhodesian African Rifles travelled to Malaya

Following the departure of "C" Squadron, Southern Rhodesia was uninvolved in Malaya until early 1956, when the 1st Battalion, the Rhodesian African Rifles (RAR) were tasked to relieve the Northern Rhodesia Regiment (NRR) in Johore province. Originally formed in 1916 as the Rhodesian Native Regiment, the RAR were, by Southern Rhodesian standards, an old and well-tried unit; they fought for Britain in East Africa during the First World War, and contributed to the Burma campaign during the Second. (Note: The Rhodesian Native Regiment (RNR) disbanded soon following the end of the First World War in 1918, and the Rhodesian African Rifles (RAR) were formed in 1940. Although technically separate, the two shared many traditions and personnel, and were generally considered to be closely linked. The RAR successfully lobbied for permission to emblazon their regimental colours with the RNR's First World War battle honours in 1952.) The regiment's black soldiers and warrant officers, led by white officers, came from both Mashonaland and Matabeleland, with Mashonas in the majority.

The Royal Australian Regiment was also present in Malaya, so to prevent confusion the Rhodesian African Rifles' acronym was temporarily changed to "RhAR". The regiment's advance party, made up of officers, non-commissioned officers (NCOs) and warrant officers, left the Southern Rhodesian capital Salisbury by air on 13 February 1956. Their tortuous route took them through Nairobi, Aden, Karachi, and RAF Negombo (in Ceylon). After touching down in Singapore, the RhAR's advance party travelled to Kluang in Johore, where they spent three weeks in jungle training with the NRR. They then redeployed to Batu Pahat, where they camped with the Fiji Infantry Regiment. A spirit of camaraderie quickly developed between the Fijian and Southern Rhodesian soldiers. The RhAR officers and NCOs continued their acclimatisation with the local environment over the following weeks, assisted by the Fijians. The rest of the battalion travelled by sea aboard SS Empire Clyde, and reached Singapore on 26 April 1956. Soon after, the RhAR set up headquarters at Chaah, about 130 kilometres (81 mi) north-west of the port city.

=== MNLA and RhAR tactics ===
By this stage of the insurgency, the MNLA had largely split into small groups of guerrillas, which existed by basing themselves in a chosen rural area, subverting local villagers and accumulating from them manpower and supplies. The lot of any security forces posted nearby was to play a constant game of hide-and-seek with the communists, whereby the army would indefinitely search for and destroy any base camps and food caches the MNLA set up. The Commonwealth leaders surmised that the MNLA could not possibly resist such a campaign forever, and would, in time, simply give up attempting to regroup.

Our African soldiers are ideally suited to jungle warfare ... far superior to the British and Ghurkha troops.

— Lt-Col Frank Fitzgerald, RhAR second-in-command in Malaya, 1957

In Malaya, the RhAR comprised A, B, C and D Companies, each of which was split into three 32-man platoons. The white lieutenant commanding each platoon carried the weapon of his choice, usually a shotgun or an FN FAL battle rifle, and acted with the assistance of a black platoon sergeant and a black warrant officer. Under the lieutenant, three black corporals led a rifle section each. These consisted of the section leader (generally armed with a shotgun), a scout, a Bren gunner, a Patchett-Sterling machine-gunner, and up to seven FN FAL riflemen. When marching through thick jungle, an RhAR patrol moved in single file, with each trooper 5 metres (16 ft) behind the man in front. The warrant officer followed close behind the lieutenant, ready to take over command if necessary, with the radio operator and medic with him. The platoon sergeant made up the rear. According to Second Lieutenant John Essex-Clark, an Australian-born officer who led an RhAR platoon in Malaya, these Southern Rhodesian units moved much faster in jungle conditions than those made up of British men. The black Southern Rhodesian soldiers were reportedly naturals when it came to tracking; many of them came from rural backgrounds, and had acquired relevant instincts and skills while growing up.

=== RhAR operations in Malaya ===
The RhAR patrolled around Johore from May to September 1956 without major incident. The rain of the Malayan monsoon season seemed endless to many of the battalion's men, and actual sightings of the communists were rare in the extreme. Even when the guerrillas were spotted, they almost invariably fled after a few shots. "We can but hope that the chaps will get a chance of seeing a CT [communist terrorist] for a change," reported an RhAR officer in August; "they are all as keen as mustard to come to blows with them." So determined were the RhAR's officers and men to come face to face with the enemy that they ambushed around the railway line at Bekok for seven nights in a row, starting on 30 October 1956. Patrols were led by a different officer each night, but there were no contacts.

Around this time the British Royal Lincolnshire Regiment, operating in the Bahau area, about 200 kilometres (120 mi) north-west of Bekok, reported to the RhAR that they had encountered the communist 32 Independent Platoon, led by Hor Lung, which was then heading south-east towards the Palong River. The RhAR therefore redeployed to intercept Hor Lung's men. On 9 November, a half-section of Southern Rhodesians led by Corporal Munyameni sighted 16 pack-laden guerrillas, marching east. On his own initiative, Munyameni attacked, catching the communists by surprise; the insurgents split up and fled, running in all directions. One fighter attempted to hide behind a tree, but was killed by RhAR rifle fire.

On 17 November, the RhAR was withdrawn for a period of rest and recuperation (R&R). The battalion's Transport Platoon was ambushed by communist guerrillas as it was returning to base: a shot through the windscreen of one of the two trucks nearly hit its driver, but the convoy was able to escape the ambush without anybody being injured. On 26 November, the RhAR and the King's Own Scottish Borderers assisted the local police at Kelapa Sawit in an action called Tartan Rock: the security forces moved into the village and arrested 34 communist sympathisers, most of whom were ethnic Chinese students from the University of Malaya in Singapore. Two days later, the RhAR were back on regular duty.

Starting in February 1957, the RhAR took part in Operations Cobble and Shoe. These were "food denial" operations, whereby efforts to deny supplies to the communists were to be redoubled. Patrols around the rubber plantations and the edges of the jungle were intensified. To prevent guerrilla supplies from north of the Rompin River from reaching the food denial areas to the south, covered by Operation Cobble, an RhAR platoon under Lieutenant David Heppenstall was posted to the area directly south of the river midway through the month. This action lasted from 21 February to 4 April 1957. There were few contacts, and only one communist was killed by Heppenstall's men, but a great deal of intelligence was secured regarding guerrilla organisation and supply routes.

Over the next few months, RhAR patrols in the Chaah, Labis, Bekok and Sungai Karas areas were stepped up to last between 10 and 18 days each, but contacts with the communist forces remained rare. The constant patrols gradually began to take their toll on the insurgents, and guerrillas began to give themselves up increasingly frequently. A contributing factor here was Britain's granting of independence to Malaya within the Commonwealth on 31 August 1957, which dented the motivation of many fighters. Starting in October 1957, the RhAR were tasked to work alongside former MNLA personnel to wipe out any remaining communist forces in the region. The ex-insurgents were supposed to lead the security forces to MNLA camps and resting places, but this strategy was not successful. The RhAR soon developed a low opinion of these ex-MNLA men.

As it approached the end of its two-year commitment in Malaya, the RhAR continued its patrolling in Johore province without major incident until February 1958, when it returned to Rhodesia. Five of the regiment's number had been killed over the previous two years: Corporal Tavengwa, and Privates Joseph, Hunyani, Manuel and Mjikijelwa.

== Influence on the Rhodesian Bush War ==
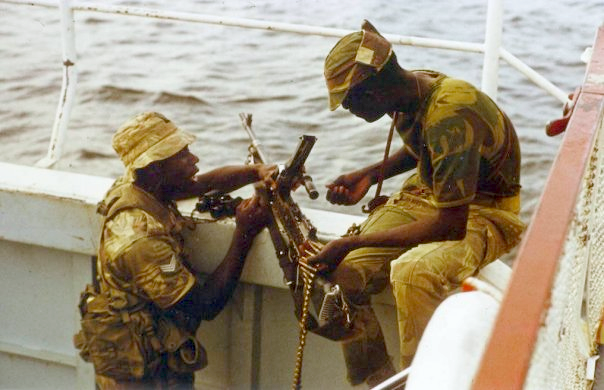
Two RhAR soldiers in 1976, during the Rhodesian Bush War

Several veterans of Malaya proceeded to hold key positions in the Rhodesian Security Forces during the Rhodesian Bush War of the 1970s, most prominently Walls and another member of "C" Squadron, Ron Reid-Daly. Walls reformed the all-white Rhodesian Light Infantry (RLI) into a commando battalion similar to the SAS during the mid-1960s, with Reid-Daly serving under him as regimental sergeant major. After leaving the RLI in 1967, Walls became head of the Rhodesian Army in 1972, and retained this role for the rest of the Bush War. Reid-Daly, meanwhile, formed and commanded the Selous Scouts special forces regiment from 1973. The Selous Scouts concept was influenced by similar operations conducted by Special Branch in Malaya. Both the Rhodesian African Rifles and the Rhodesian SAS endured following Malaya, and served in the Bush War.

The South African historian Jakkie Cilliers, writing about the Rhodesian Bush War, comments on the gulf between what he calls the "Malaya clique" and those lower-ranking Rhodesian soldiers in the field, the latter of whom underestimated the threat posed by the guerilla campaigns, having not previously encountered a communist insurgency situation. From the mid-1970s, officers such as Walls attempted to impress upon their contemporaries the similarity between the Rhodesian situation and the one they had experienced in Malaya. Operations in Malaya had been coordinated nationally, while in Rhodesia the Army, Air Force and Police were sometimes at odds with each other. To resolve this the Rhodesians created a supreme body called Combined Operations in 1977, influenced by similar posts in Malaya, with Walls at its head.

== See also ==
- The Cenotaph in Bulawayo, which commemorates the war dead of the Malayan Emergency and other theatres in which Southern Rhodesia was involved

== Notes and references ==
=== Newspaper articles ===
- "Obituary — Major Alastair McGregor". The Daily Telegraph. London. 3 October 2002.

=== Online sources ===
- "Roll of Honour: "C" Squadron 22 SAS, One Special Air Service Regiment". Rhodesian Army Association. Archived from the original on 3 June 2012.
- "Vale: Peter Walls". Rhodesian Light Infantry Regimental Association. Archived from the original on 5 June 2015.

=== Government documents ===
- "Federation of Malaya Independence Act 1957". London: Government of the United Kingdom. 31 July 1957. 1957 Chapter 60 5 and 6 Eliz 2.

=== Bibliography ===
- Abbott, Peter; Botham, Philip (1986). Modern African Wars: Rhodesia, 1965–80. Oxford: Osprey Publishing. ISBN 978-0-85045-728-5.
- Arnold, James R; Wiener, Roberta (2012). Cold War: The Essential Reference Guide. Santa Barbara, California: ABC-CLIO. ISBN 978-1-61069-004-1.
- Binda, Alexandre (2007). Heppenstall, David (ed.). Masodja: The History of the Rhodesian African Rifles and its forerunner the Rhodesian Native Regiment. Johannesburg: 30° South Publishers. ISBN 978-1-920143-03-9.
- Binda, Alexandre (2008). The Saints: The Rhodesian Light Infantry. Johannesburg: 30° South Publishers. ISBN 978-1-920143-07-7.
- Cilliers, Jakkie (1984). Counter-Insurgency in Rhodesia. London, Sydney & Dover, New Hampshire: Croom Helm. ISBN 978-0-7099-3412-7.
- Geraghty, Tony (1980). Who Dares Wins: The Story of the Special Air Service, 1950–1980. London: Arms and Armour Press. ISBN 978-0-85368-457-2.
- MacKenzie, Alastair (2011). Special Force: The Untold Story of 22nd Special Air Service Regiment. London & New York: I B Tauris. ISBN 978-1-84885-071-2.
- Scurr, John (2005) [1981]. The Malayan Campaign 1948–60. Oxford: Osprey Publishing. ISBN 978-0-85045-476-5.
- Shortt, James; McBride, Angus (1981). The Special Air Service. Oxford: Osprey Publishing. ISBN 0-85045-396-8.
- Stapleton, Timothy (2011). African Police and Soldiers in Colonial Zimbabwe, 1923–80. Rochester, New York: University of Rochester Press. ISBN 978-1-58046-380-5.
- Wood, J R T (2005). So far and no further! Rhodesia's bid for independence during the retreat from empire 1959–1965. Victoria, British Columbia: Trafford Publishing. ISBN 978-1-4120-4952-8.
