= Church of the White Bird =

Christian church in eastern Rhodesia

The Original Church of the White Bird (or Shiri Chena Church) was a Christian church in eastern Rhodesia (now Zimbabwe) that combined Christian religious beliefs with traditional Shona symbolism.

The Church of the White Bird was founded by Matthew Chigaga Zvimba, the son of a government-appointed chief of the Zvimba Reserve. After years of difficulty with the white authorities, Zvimba founded the church in 1915 by occupying a Methodist station in his father's village. The Church of the White Bird was the first of a number of independent Shona churches.

== History ==
=== Missionary Presence in Southern Africa ===
The presence of European missionaries in Southern Africa dates back to Portuguese Jesuit priest Father Goncalo da Silveira arriving in the Munhumutapa Empire in 1560. Father Goncalo da Silveira was allegedly received with great hospitality and was gifted gold, cattle and slaves by the Shona Emperor Munhumutapa who sought political support from the Portuguese missionaries. Emperor Munhumutapa signed a treaty with Portugal, allowing missionaries free passage throughout Shona land.

The second wave of European missionaries in Southern Africa began in 1855 with the London Missionary Society in Ndebele territory. Missionary Robert Moffat established a mission station in Matebeleland and made little progress proselytizing the population, and instead the Ndebele king demanded payment from Moffat with western goods. In 1872, the Shona welcomed the Dutch Reformed Church with similar aims of trading foreign goods such as guns and gun powder. Meanwhile, missionaries who refused to meet Shona demands were expelled from the region, such as in 1883, when the mission enterprise led by Gabriel and Petrus Buys abruptly ended when the missionary party clashed with the local Chief Zimuto. To the Shona people, land was the sacred property of Mwari (God), and was not meant to be occupied by the European missionaries.

However, in 1888 the Rudd Concession was jointly signed by the London Missionary Society and King Lobengula after it was falsely translated to the latter party. This treaty ultimately allowed Europeans to take gold and over 455,000 acres of land from Matebeleland over the following seventy years.

After the Rudd Concession, missionaries assumed a more political role in Southern African society, creating rules that prevented Africans from participating in traditional practices like polygamous marriages, paying and receiving bride wealth, and drinking beer. The missionary church was also empowered to collect taxes and in 1917, was allowed to enforce compulsory measures to remove Africans' dependence on their livestock and the land.

In 1923, self-government was granted to white settlers in Southern Rhodesia under the British Crown, stripping Africans of political power. The following 1930 Land Apportionment Act and 1934 Industrial Conciliation Act further restricted Africans from land ownership and some sectors of employment.

=== African Resistance ===
From 1895 until 1898, Shona and Ndebele revolutionaries led guerilla warfare in a conflict that came to be known as Chimurenga I. Leaders such as Sekuru Kagubi and Mkwati rejected missionary Christianity as a mechanism of control over Africans and instead promoted African religion as a basis for revolution.

In 1920, peaceful initiatives such as the Rhodesian Bantu Voters Association and Rhodesia Native Association were founded. These organizations followed a liberal ideology that preferred a gradual introduction of Africans in politics rather than through militant and revolutionary means. Religious leaders also played a role, starting with the establishment of Ethiopianism by Reverend Micah Makgatho in South Africa and Rhodesia. Ethiopianism attempted to link African religions to a new form of Christianity rooted in a Biblical Ethiopia, and was the beginning of an ideological discourse to validate the new African Initiated Churches and African Christian movement.

==== The Shiri Chena Church ====
In 1915, Reverend Matthew Chigaga Zvimba broke away from missionary Methodism and formed the Original Church of the White Bird, or Shiri Chena. Through the Shiri Chena Church, Zvimba supported African chiefs who defied white rule and likewise opposed European-appointed African leaders.

== Theology and Political Ideology ==
The Original Church of the White Bird, or Shiri Chena, was a Shona church established by Matthew Chigaga Zvimba in defiance of white missionary Methodism. Zvimba created lists of rebels killed in the guerilla fighting in the Zvimba Reserve from 1896-1897 and regarded them as saints and martyrs of the church. The white bird in the Original Church of the White Bird represented the traditional messenger of the god Mwari to mankind.

The Shiri Chena Church was an early African Initiated Church, serving as a leading force in African nationalism. African Initiated Churches in Southern Africa tended to exhibit certain characteristics, including recognition of Jesus Christ, reliance on the Bible as a normative text, belief in the triune of God (Father, Son and Holy Spirit), celebration of baptism and holy communion, adherence to Christian-oriented ethical codes for living, and in general, becoming “havens of belonging” for African communities. The Shiri Chena Church is noted by some scholars as an important expression of African pride and empowerment of disenfranchised Africans.

== Matthew Chigaga Zvimba ==
Matthew Chigaga Zvimba was the son of Paramount Chief Zvimba. From 1905 until 1907, Matthew Zvimba trained at the Waddilove Institution at the behest of the Zimbabwean Methodist Synod. In 1909, Zvimba helped to establish a Methodist mission station near his father’s village. He had a tense relationship with the white missionary leaders there, leading to his dismissal as a teacher and catechist.

On August 7, 1915, Zvimba applied for permission to form the Original White Bird Mission. The Chief Native Commissioner rejected the application, citing Zvimba as “an undesirable character” and instructing Zvimba to stop preaching or teaching on religious subjects. Despite this, Zvimba took over the mission station at his father’s village. This was the first breakaway church of the Wesleyan Methodist Church.

=== Imprisonment ===
As a part of the Shiri Chena Church, Zvimba created a list of Shona revolutionaries to be regarded as saints and martyrs of the religion. When the government discovered this list, Zvimba was imprisoned for sedition. He was eventually released.

=== Meshek Zvimba ===
Matthew Zvimba’s brother, Meshek, also formed an African-Initiated Church called Hatitongwe, which translates to “We shall not be governed”.

== Legacy ==
The Shiri Chena Church gradually died out and had few repercussions within the Methodist Church. However, Matthew Zvimba was regarded by his contemporaries as a modernizing leader and intermediary between the people of the Zvimba Reserve and the external Christian religion. The Shiri Chena Church, although no longer existing, represented the early contribution of African religion in the political and cultural liberation of twentieth-century Southern Africa from European-imposed governance.
