= Outline of Zimbabwe =

Landlocked country in Southern Africa

The Flag of Zimbabwe

The Coat of arms of Zimbabwe

The location of Zimbabwe

The following outline is provided as an overview of and topical guide to Zimbabwe:

Zimbabwe – landlocked sovereign country located in Southern Africa, between the Zambezi River and Limpopo River.

== General reference ==
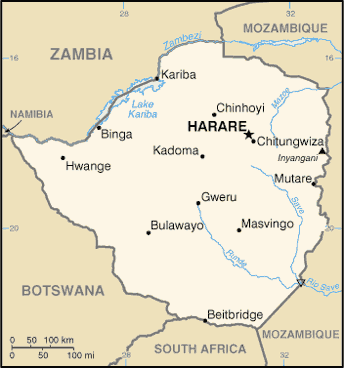
An enlargeable basic map of Zimbabwe

- Pronunciation: /zɪmˈbɑːbweɪ/
- Common English country name: Zimbabwe
- Official English country name: The Republic of Zimbabwe
- Common endonym(s):
- Official endonym(s):
- Adjectival(s): Zimbabwean
- Demonym(s): Zimbabwean(s)
- Etymology: Name of Zimbabwe
- International rankings of Zimbabwe
- ISO country codes: ZW, ZWE, 716
- ISO region codes: See ISO 3166-2:ZW
- Internet country code top-level domain: .zw

== Geography of Zimbabwe ==
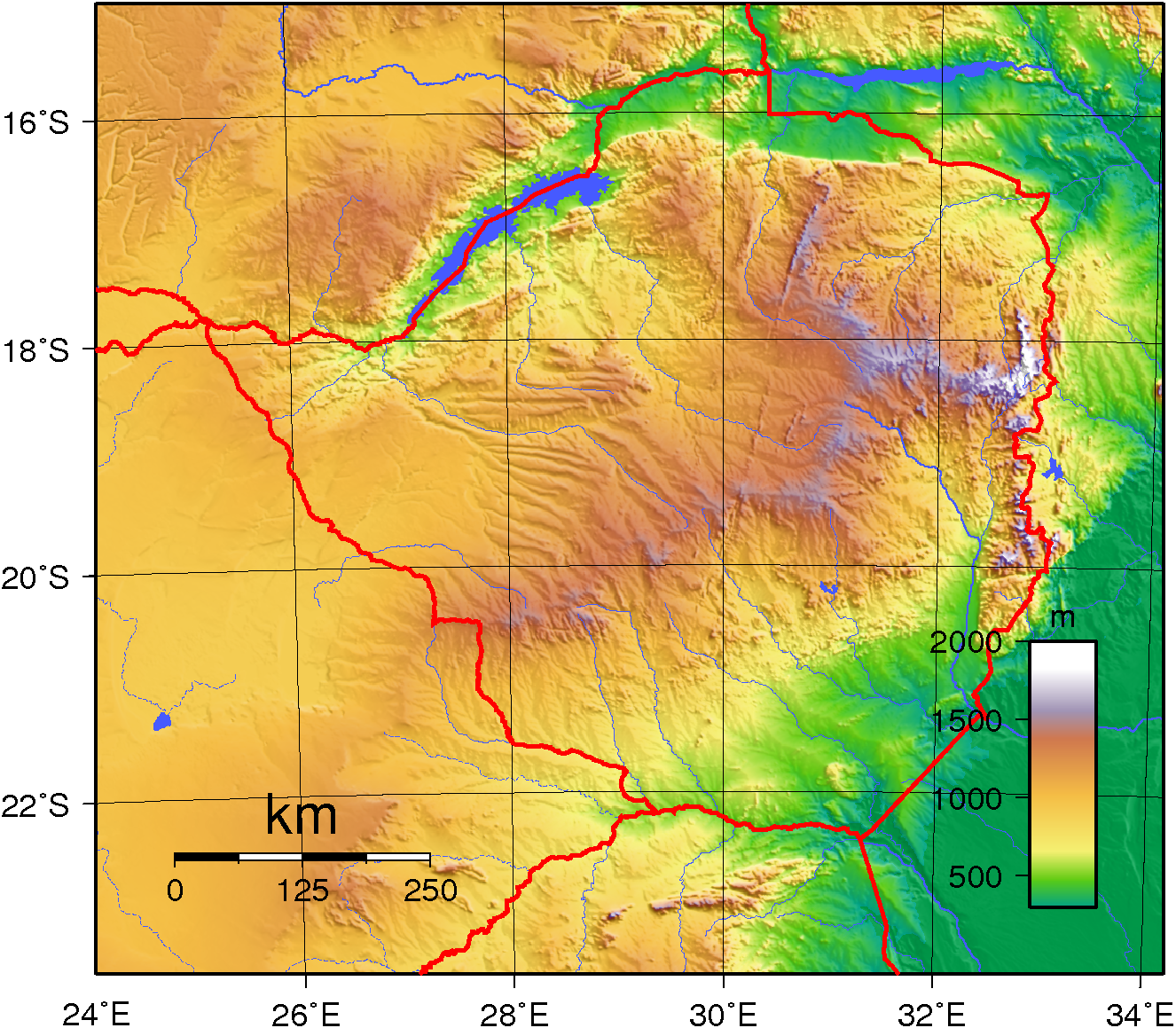
An enlargeable topographic map of Zimbabwe

Geography of Zimbabwe

- Zimbabwe is: a landlocked country
- Location:
  - Eastern Hemisphere and Southern Hemisphere
  - Africa
    - East Africa
    - Southern Africa
  - Time zone: Central Africa Time (UTC+02)
  - Extreme points of Zimbabwe
    - High: Mount Nyangani 2,592 m (8,504 ft)
    - Low: Confluence of Runde River and Save River 162 m (531 ft)
  - Land boundaries: 3,066 km

Mozambique 1,231 km
Botswana 813 km
Zambia 797 km
South Africa 225 km

- Coastline: none

- Place names in Zimbabwe
- Population: 11,392,000 people (2009 estimate) - 73rd most populous country
- Area: 390,580 km^{2} (150,800 sq mi) - 60th largest country
- Atlas of Zimbabwe

=== Environment of Zimbabwe ===
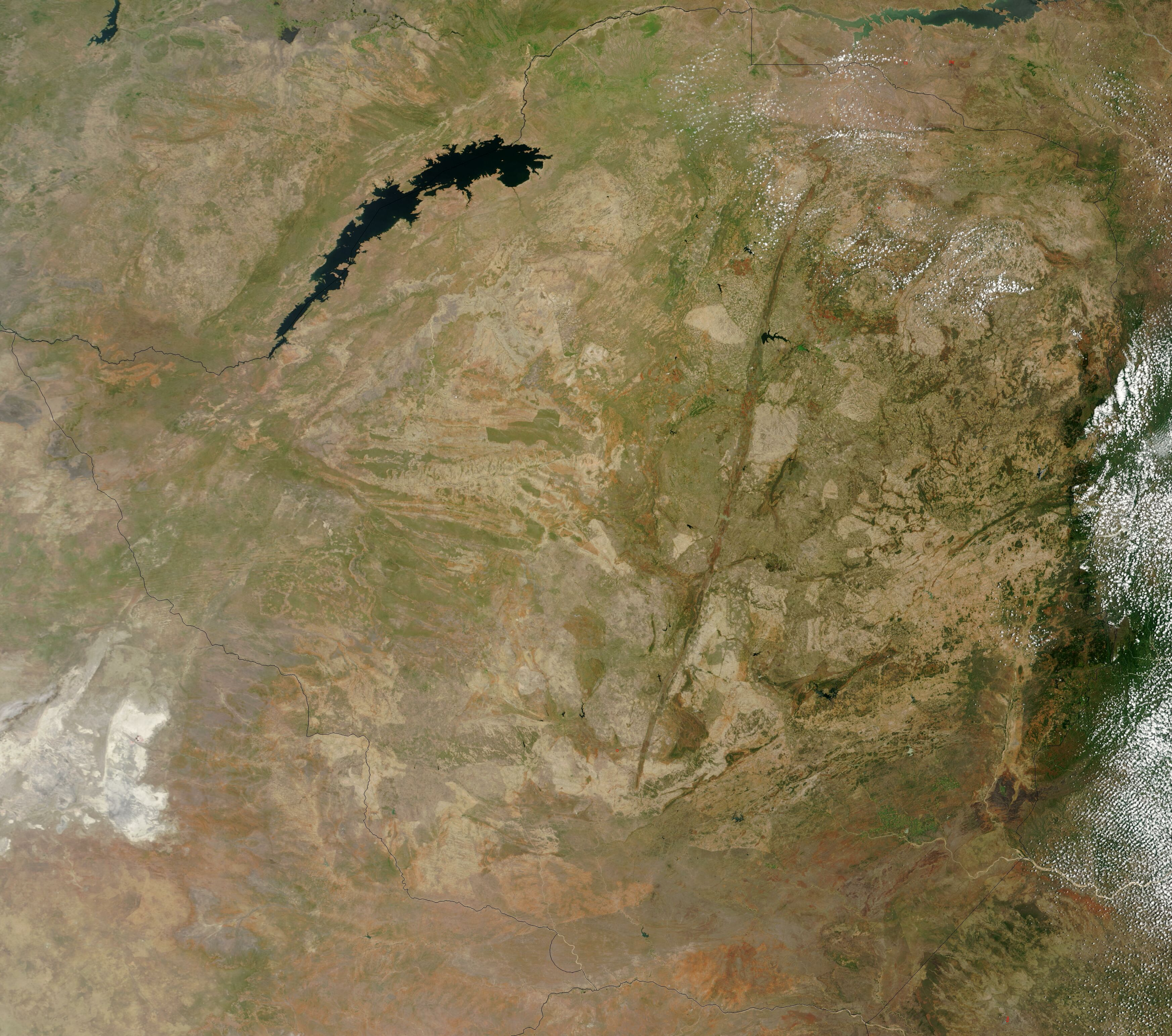
An enlargeable satellite image of Zimbabwe

- Climate of Zimbabwe
- Ecoregions in Zimbabwe
- Renewable energy in Zimbabwe
- Geology of Zimbabwe
- Protected areas of Zimbabwe
  - National parks of Zimbabwe
  - Zimbabwe Parks and Wildlife Estate
- Wildlife of Zimbabwe
  - Fauna of Zimbabwe
    - Birds of Zimbabwe
    - Mammals of Zimbabwe

==== Natural geographic features of Zimbabwe ====
- Glaciers in Zimbabwe: none
- Mountains of Zimbabwe
  - Volcanoes in Zimbabwe: no active volcanoes
- Rivers of Zimbabwe
- World Heritage Sites in Zimbabwe

=== Regions of Zimbabwe ===
Regions of Zimbabwe

==== Ecoregions of Zimbabwe ====
List of ecoregions in Zimbabwe

==== Administrative divisions of Zimbabwe ====
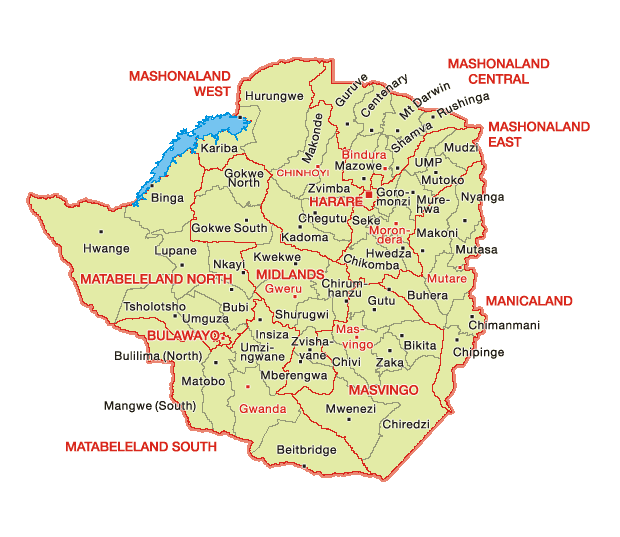

- Provinces of Zimbabwe
  - Districts of Zimbabwe
    - Municipalities of Zimbabwe

Zimbabwe is divided into 8 provinces and 2 cities with provincial status:

1. Bulawayo (city)
2. Harare (city)
3. Manicaland
4. Mashonaland Central
5. Mashonaland East
6. Mashonaland West
7. Masvingo
8. Matabeleland North
9. Matabeleland South
10. Midlands

The Provinces of Zimbabwe are divided into 59 districts and 1,200 municipalities. The districts are listed below, by province:

Bulawayo (city)

- Bulawayo

Harare (city)

- Harare

Manicaland Province

- Buhera
- Chimanimani
- Chipinge
- Makoni
- Mutare
- Mutasa
- Nyanga

Mashonaland Central Province

- Bindura
- Guruve
- Mazowe
- Mukumbura
- Muzarabani
- Shamva

Mashonaland East Province

- Chikomba
- Goromonzi
- Hwedza
- Marondera
- Murehwa
- Mutoko
- Uzumba-Maramba-Pfungwe

Mashonaland West Province

- Chegutu
- Kadoma
- Kariba
- Makonde
- Zvimba

Masvingo Province

- Bikita
- Chiredzi
- Chivi
- Gutu
- Masvingo
- Mwenezi
- Zaka

Matabeleland North Province

- Binga
- Bubi
- Hwange
- Lupane
- Nkayi
- Tsholotsho
- Umguza

Matabeleland South Province

- Beitbridge
- Bulilimamangwe
- Gwanda
- Insiza

Midlands Province

- Chirumhanzu
- Gokwe North
- Gokwe South
- Gweru
- Kwekwe
- Mberengwa
- Shurugwi
- Zvishavane

- Capital of Zimbabwe: Harare
- Cities of Zimbabwe
  - Largest cities:
    - Harare
    - Bulawayo
    - Chitungwiza
    - Mutare
    - Gweru
    - Kwekwe
    - Kadoma
    - Masvingo
    - Chinhoyi
    - Marondera

=== Demography of Zimbabwe ===
Demographics of Zimbabwe

== Government and politics of Zimbabwe ==
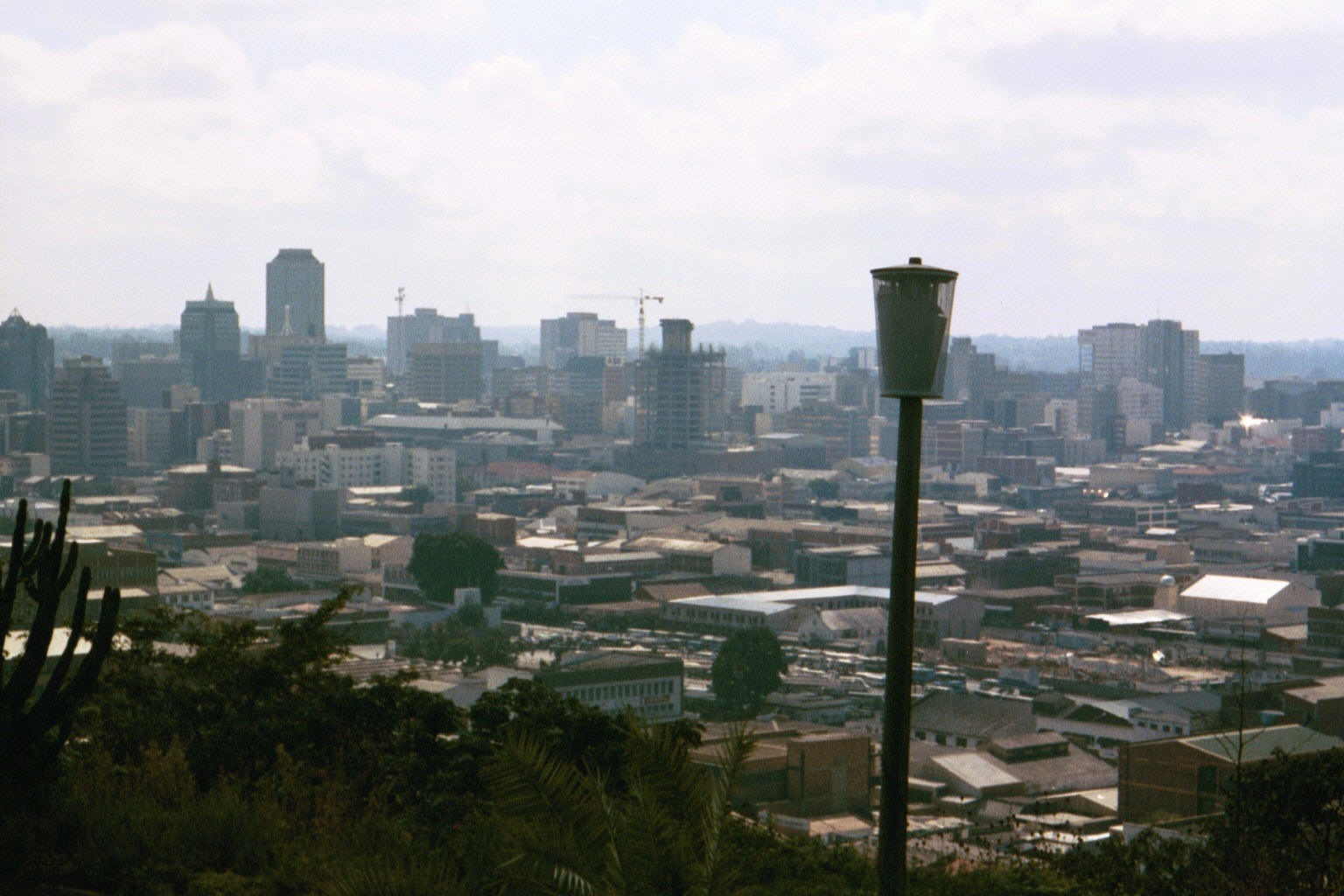
Harare, the capital of Zimbabwe

Politics of Zimbabwe

- Form of government: semi-presidential republic
- Capital of Zimbabwe: Harare
- Politics of Rhodesia
- Elections in Zimbabwe
  - Zimbabwean presidential elections
      - 1990
      - 1996
      - 2002
      - 2008
  - Zimbabwean and Rhodesian parliamentary elections
      - 1899
      - 1902
      - 1905
      - 1908
      - 1911
      - 1914
      - 1920
      - 1924
      - 1928
      - 1933
      - 1934
      - 1939
      - 1946
      - 1948
      - 1954
      - 1958
      - 1962
      - 1965
      - 1970
      - 1974
      - 1977
      - 1979
      - (Zimbabwe) 1980
      - 1985
      - 1990
      - 1995
      - 2000
      - 2005
      - 2008
- Land reform in Zimbabwe
- Liberalism in Zimbabwe
- Political parties in Zimbabwe
  - Operation Murambatsvina
  - Zimbabwe Revenue Authority

=== Branches of the government of Zimbabwe ===
Government of Zimbabwe

==== Executive branch of the government of Zimbabwe ====
- Head of state and Head of Government: President of Zimbabwe, Emmerson Mnangagwa
  - Vice-President of Zimbabwe, Constantino Chiwenga (first) & Kembo Mohadi (second)
- Cabinet of Zimbabwe

==== Legislative branch of the government of Zimbabwe ====
- Parliament of Zimbabwe (bicameral)
  - Upper house: Senate of Zimbabwe
  - Lower house: House of Assembly of Zimbabwe

==== Judicial branch of the government of Zimbabwe ====
Judicial branch of the government of Zimbabwe

- Supreme Court of Zimbabwe

=== Foreign relations of Zimbabwe ===
Foreign relations of Zimbabwe

- Diplomatic missions in Zimbabwe
- Diplomatic missions of Zimbabwe

==== Relations with specific countries ====
- Angola–Zimbabwe relations
- Australia–Zimbabwe relations
- Israel – Zimbabwe relations
- Namibia–Zimbabwe relations
- Sino-Zimbabwe relations
- United States-Zimbabwe relations
  - Detention of US and UK diplomats in Zimbabwe
  - Zimbabwe Democracy and Economic Recovery Act of 2001

==== International organization membership ====
International organization membership of Zimbabwe The Republic of Zimbabwe is a member of:

- African, Caribbean, and Pacific Group of States (ACP)
- African Development Bank Group (AfDB)
- African Union (AU)
- Common Market for Eastern and Southern Africa (COMESA)
- Food and Agriculture Organization (FAO)
- General Agreement on Tariffs and Trade (GATT)
- Group of 15 (G15)
- International Atomic Energy Agency (IAEA)
- International Bank for Reconstruction and Development (IBRD)
- International Civil Aviation Organization (ICAO)
- International Criminal Court (ICCt) (signatory)
- International Criminal Police Organization (Interpol)
- International Development Association (IDA)
- International Federation of Red Cross and Red Crescent Societies (IFRCS)
- International Finance Corporation (IFC)
- International Fund for Agricultural Development (IFAD)
- International Labour Organization (ILO)
- International Maritime Organization (IMO)
- International Monetary Fund (IMF)
- International Olympic Committee (IOC)
- International Organization for Migration (IOM)
- International Organization for Standardization (ISO)
- International Red Cross and Red Crescent Movement (ICRM)
- International Telecommunication Union (ITU)
- International Telecommunications Satellite Organization (ITSO)
- International Trade Union Confederation (ITUC)
- Inter-Parliamentary Union (IPU)
- Multilateral Investment Guarantee Agency (MIGA)
- Nonaligned Movement (NAM)
- Organisation for the Prohibition of Chemical Weapons (OPCW)
- Permanent Court of Arbitration (PCA)
- Southern African Development Community (SADC)
- United Nations (UN)
- United Nations Conference on Trade and Development (UNCTAD)
- United Nations Educational, Scientific, and Cultural Organization (UNESCO)
- United Nations Industrial Development Organization (UNIDO)
- United Nations Mission in Liberia (UNMIL)
- United Nations Mission in the Sudan (UNMIS)
- United Nations Operation in Cote d'Ivoire (UNOCI)
- Universal Postal Union (UPU)
- World Confederation of Labour (WCL)
- World Customs Organization (WCO)
- World Federation of Trade Unions (WFTU)
- World Health Organization (WHO)
- World Intellectual Property Organization (WIPO)
- World Meteorological Organization (WMO)
- World Tourism Organization (UNWTO)
- World Trade Organization (WTO)

=== Law and order in Zimbabwe ===
Law of Zimbabwe

- Constitution of Zimbabwe
- Crime in Zimbabwe
  - Human trafficking in Zimbabwe
- Human rights in Zimbabwe
  - LGBT rights in Zimbabwe
- Law enforcement in Zimbabwe
  - Zimbabwe Republic Police

=== Military of Zimbabwe ===
Military of Zimbabwe

- Command
  - Commander-in-chief:President of Zimbabwe
    - Ministry of Defence of Zimbabwe
      - Joint Operations Command
- Forces
  - Army
  - Navy: None
  - Air Force
  - Special forces
- Military history of Zimbabwe

=== Local government in Zimbabwe ===
Local government in Zimbabwe

== History of Zimbabwe ==
=== By period ===
- Pre-colonial history
  - Mutapa Kingdom (c. 1450–1698)
  - Torwa dynasty (c. 1450–1683)
  - Rozwi Empire (c. 1684–1834)
  - Matabeleland (Kingdom: 1837–1894; Province: 1923–present)
- Early European settlement (16th century; c.1890–1923)
- Colonial history (1923–1965)
- Rhodesia (1965–1979)
- Zimbabwe Rhodesia (1979–1980)
- Zimbabwe (1980 – present)

=== By field ===
- Economic history of Zimbabwe
- Military history of Zimbabwe
- Political history of Zimbabwe

== Culture of Zimbabwe ==
Culture of Zimbabwe

- Architecture of Zimbabwe
- Cuisine of Zimbabwe
- Languages of Zimbabwe
  - Official language: English
  - Indigenous languages:
    - Primary language of Zimbabwe: Shona (a Bantu language and the native language of the Shona people)
    - Sindebele (spoken by the Matabele people)
- Media in Zimbabwe
  - Newspapers in Zimbabwe
- National symbols of Zimbabwe
  - Coat of arms of Zimbabwe
  - Flag of Zimbabwe
  - National anthem of Zimbabwe
- People of Zimbabwe
  - Ndebele people
  - Whites in Zimbabwe
- Prostitution in Zimbabwe
- Public holidays in Zimbabwe
- Religion in Zimbabwe
  - Christianity in Zimbabwe
  - Hinduism in Zimbabwe
  - Islam in Zimbabwe
  - Judaism in Zimbabwe
- World Heritage Sites in Zimbabwe

=== Art in Zimbabwe ===
- Art in Zimbabwe
  - National Gallery of Zimbabwe
- Dance in Zimbabwe
- HIFA (Harare International Festival of the Arts)
- Music of Zimbabwe

=== Sports in Zimbabwe ===
Sports in Zimbabwe

- Football in Zimbabwe
  - Zimbabwe national football team
- Zimbabwe at the Commonwealth Games
- Zimbabwe at the Olympics

== Economy and infrastructure of Zimbabwe ==
Key crops production in Zimbabwe

Economy of Zimbabwe

- Economic rank, by nominal GDP (2007): 156th (one hundred and fifty sixth)
- Hyperinflation in Zimbabwe
- Communications in Zimbabwe
  - Internet in Zimbabwe

* Companies of Zimbabwe

- Currency of Zimbabwe: Dollar, Dollar, Euro, Rand, Pula, Pound Sterling (Note: Although the Zimbabwean dollar it is still the official currency, the United States dollar, South African rand, Botswanan pula, Pound sterling and Euro are mostly used instead as the local currency is practically worthless. The US Dollar has been adopted as the official currency for all government transactions with the new power-sharing regime.)
  - ISO 4217: ZWD/USD/EUR/ZAR/BWP/GBP
- Economic history of Zimbabwe
- Energy in Zimbabwe
- Zimbabwe Stock Exchange
  - Zimbabwe Industrial Index

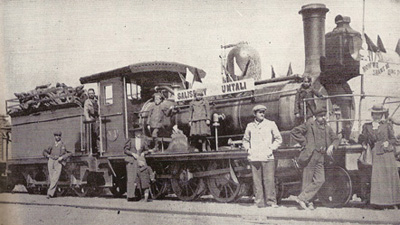
Opening of the railroad to Umtali in 1899

- Health care in Zimbabwe
- Transport in Zimbabwe
  - Air transport in Zimbabwe
    - Airlines in Zimbabwe
    - Airports in Zimbabwe
  - Rail transport in Zimbabwe
- Water supply and sanitation in Zimbabwe

=== Economic sectors ===
- Agriculture in Zimbabwe
- Banking in Zimbabwe
  - National Bank of Zimbabwe
  - List of banks in Zimbabwe
- Communications in Zimbabwe
- Mining in Zimbabwe
- Tourism in Zimbabwe
- Transport in Zimbabwe

== Education in Zimbabwe ==
Education in Zimbabwe

List of schools in Zimbabwe

- Universities in Zimbabwe
  - NUST
  - University of Zimbabwe

== Health in Zimbabwe ==
Health in Zimbabwe

== See also ==
Zimbabwe

- Education in Zimbabwe
- List of international rankings
- List of Zimbabwe-related topics
- Member state of the United Nations
- Outline of Africa
- Outline of geography
