= 1902 Southern Rhodesian Legislative Council election =

The Southern Rhodesia Legislative Council election of March 17, 1902 was the second election to the Legislative Council of Southern Rhodesia. No change was made in the administration of the elections compared with the first elections three years previously, so the Legislative Council continued to comprise ten voting members: the Administrator of Southern Rhodesia ex officio, five members nominated by the British South Africa Company, and four members elected by registered voters from two electoral districts. The Resident Commissioner of Southern Rhodesia, Sir Marshal James Clarke, also sat on the Legislative Council ex officio but without the right to vote.

== Results ==
Constituency Electorate and turnout	Candidate	Votes
MASHONALAND; 1,287	†Raleigh Grey	unopposed
MASHONALAND; 1,287	Richard John Wylie	unopposed
MATABELELAND; 1,755 (65.5%)	Percival Ross Frames	867
MATABELELAND; 1,755 (65.5%)	Charles Theodore Holland	647
MATABELELAND; 1,755 (65.5%)	John Edward Scott	489

Note: Raleigh Grey was absent through the whole of the first session of the Legislative Council.

== Additional elections ==
A new Order in Council promulgated in 1903 expanded the Legislative Council to fourteen members, seven to be directly elected, seven nominated by the British South Africa Company, and the Administrator to retain his seat ex officio so as to have a casting vote. Polling day was fixed for May 22, 1903.

New electoral districts were drawn up for the expanded election. The Northern District, returning two members, and the Eastern District, returning one, were carved out of Mashonaland, with the remaining parts merging with part of Matabeleland to form the Midland District (returning one member) and the Western District (returning three). In order to provide continuity, the sitting members for Mashonaland were automatically made the members for the Northern District (as it contained Salisbury), and the sitting members for Matabeleland were made members for the Western District (as it contained Bulawayo). However, before the election, Percival Ross Frames resigned his seat on the council (March 24, 1903) and so two members were elected for the Western District.

== Results ==
Constituency Electorate and turnout	Candidate	Votes
EASTERN; 574 (62.4%)	John Meikle	227
EASTERN; 574 (62.4%)	Francis Rudolph Myburgh	131
MIDLAND	Herman Melville Heyman	unopposed
WESTERN	William Henry Haddon	877
WESTERN	William Napier	786
WESTERN	Leopold Frank Moore	509

== Nominated members ==
The initial five members nominated by the British South Africa Company were:

- John Gilbert Kotzé, Attorney-General
- Sir Thomas Charles Scanlen KCMG, Additional Law Officer
- Joseph Millerd Orpen, Surveyor-General
- Townshend Griffin, Commissioner of Mines and Public Works
- Herbert Hayton Castens, Chief Secretary

During the absence of Townshend Griffin from November 7, 1902, Clarkson Henry Tredgold (Solicitor-General) stood in for him. When the membership was expanded in 1903, the nominated members were:

- Sir Thomas Charles Scanlen KCMG, Additional Law Officer
- Francis James Newton CMG, Treasurer
- Herbert Hayton Castens, Chief Secretary
- Clarkson Henry Tredgold, Attorney-General
- James Hutchison Kennedy, Master of the High Court
- Edward Ross Townsend, Secretary for Agriculture
- Ernest William Sanders Montagu, Secretary for Mines
