= 1905 Southern Rhodesian Legislative Council election =

The Southern Rhodesia Legislative Council election of 1905 was the third election to the Legislative Council of Southern Rhodesia. The Legislative Council had, since 1903, comprised fifteen voting members: the Administrator of Southern Rhodesia ex officio, seven members nominated by the British South Africa Company, and seven members elected by registered voters from four electoral districts. The Resident Commissioner of Southern Rhodesia, Richard Chester-Master, also sat on the Legislative Council ex officio but without the right to vote.

The election was to have taken place on March 6, 1905 but in the event all the places were filled by unopposed nominations on February 6 and so no poll was taken.

== Results ==
Constituency Electorate and turnout	Candidate	Votes
EASTERN	†Francis Rudolph Myburgh	unopposed
MIDLAND	Herbert Thomas Longden	unopposed
NORTHERN; Two members	†Raleigh Grey	unopposed
NORTHERN; Two members	Ernest Edward Homan	unopposed
WESTERN; Three members	Gordon Stewart Drummond Forbes	unopposed
WESTERN; Three members	†William Henry Haddon	unopposed
WESTERN; Three members	†William Napier	unopposed

Note: Raleigh Grey was absent during the whole of the 1906 session.

== Nominated members ==
The members nominated by the British South Africa Company were:

- Sir Thomas Charles Scanlen KCMG, Additional Law Officer (also Acting Administrator from May 24, 1907 during the absence of Sir William Henry Milton)
- Francis James Newton CMG, Treasurer
- Herbert Hayton Castens, Chief Secretary
- Clarkson Henry Tredgold, Attorney-General
- James Hutchison Kennedy, Master of the High Court
- Edward Ross Townsend, Secretary for Agriculture
- Ernest William Sanders Montagu, Secretary for Mines
