= Bulawayo Club =

Hotel in Zimbabwe

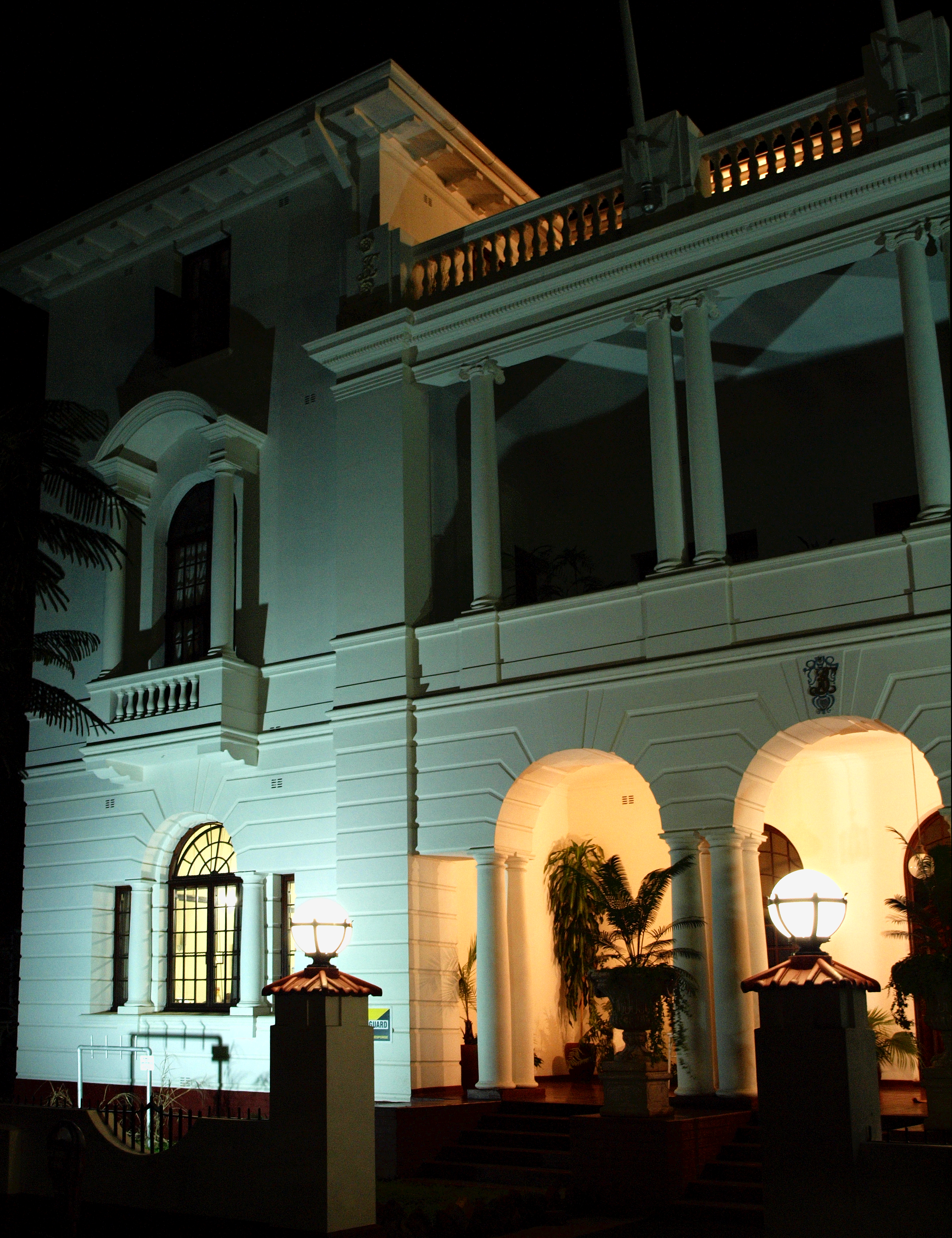
- Hotel illuminated at night, 2010
- Interactive map of the Bulawayo Club area
- Etymology: City of Bulawayo

General information
- Location: 8th and Fort Streets, Bulawayo, Zimbabwe
- Coordinates: 20.154863°S 28.581243°E
- Years built: 1895 (original building); 1934 (reconstruction)
- Owner: Owned and operated by membership

Technical details
- Material: Sandstone, Oregon pine

Website
- www.bulawayoclub.com

The Bulawayo Club is a hotel and former gentlemen's club located in Bulawayo, Zimbabwe. Founded more than a century ago, is noted for its remarkable preservation of its vintage state prior to decolonization. It has been described as "one of the last few visible bastions of colonial days" in the country.

== History ==
The Bulawayo Club was founded around the time of the city itself, in 1895. (Note: The West Wyalong Advocate reported on its June 7, 1895 edition that the club was new at the time and was still acquiring furniture. The firm date of establishment is not clear.) It was created by British emigrants to the Colony of Rhodesia, who sought to recreate the gentlemen's clubs of England, although its origins were with that of Cecil Rhodes. It was one of many clubs in the city, with Bulawayo being described as "a town of clubs"; those places were where the English-descent men congregated and were hubs of social life. It was located on Main St and cost 26 pounds and 5 shillings to enter, and an annual membership cost 12 pounds and 12 shillings. It was famed among elites in the British Empire for having high-quality coffee and cigars, among the finest available in the world at the time. During that period in the 1890s, the composition of the club was "mostly friends of Cecil Rhodes."

That building was destroyed during the First Chimurenga a year or so later. At the time of the war, of it was the site of a laager and civilian fortification prior to its immediate destruction. It is now Barclay's Bank, located along 8th Avenue and Joshua Nkomo Street. By 1908, the Bulawayo Club had been relocated to a one-story bungalow with wide verandas circling it. That location was visited by Edward VIII, then-the Prince of Wales at the beginning of his visit to the city during a tour in British Southern Africa.

The current hotel began construction in 1934. On March 28 of that year, the foundation stone was laid by Prince George, Duke of Kent. Its edifice was constructed from sandstone. It was the first prefabricated building in the city, and its walls were made with pressed paper imported from England. Electricity was installed around the time of the construction of that building, and is therefore one of the oldest accommodations in the country.

Women were historically not allowed within the club, and were only permitted once or twice a year for certain co-ed functions. This persisted through at least the early 2000s. In modern times, any paying guest is allowed in. In the 1930s and 1940s of the colonial period, many Nyasa people emigrated to the city for economic opportunities, and became dominant in the service industry, with the Nyasa providing a majority of the waitstaff position in the club, including the Maître d'hôtel. At least through the late 1980s, a strict dress code was maintained, requiring suit jackets on its guests, which was controversial as a holdover requirement from the olden days.

In 2008-2009, the building opened to the public; non-members of the club are allowed admission, mostly for historical appreciation of the contents of the club.

== Description ==
The Globe and Mail described the club as "[occupying] an imposing three-story cream building with tall pillars and a broad, second-floor balustrade." The floors are made from Oregon pine.

There are thousands of hunting trophies, paintings, prints, and other military memorabilia available both on display and in storage at the club. 8 of Thomas Baines' paintings of Mosi-oa-Tunya are located in the gallery. A bust of Cecil Rhodes stands in the lobby, and the snooker room contains plaques commemorating the members who died in the World Wars.

== Amenities ==
The club offers hotel accommodations with 15 rooms for both locals and tourists. It offers free internet, a snooker room, and a historic library. They hold conferences, seminars, and private events, and are equipped with a catering operation, two bars, and a restaurant.

One of the bars is themed to Southern African rugby, and boasts a large sum of merchandise and photographs related to the history of the sport in the region. Such items were relocated to the club from the Hartsfield Rugby Grounds in the city in May 2015. The restaurant is located in an atrium at the center of the complex, serving breakfast and lunch.

== Notable members ==
- David Coltart
- Herbert Stephen Henderson
- Jairos Jiri, the first black member of the club

=== Founding members ===
- Alexander Cambridge, 1st Earl of Athlone
- Sir Frederick Carrington
- Charles Grey, 5th Earl Grey
- Sir Weston Jarvis
- Sir Richard Martin
- Captain John Sanctuary Nicholson
- Hans Sauer
- John Christopher Willoughby, 5th Baronet
