= Hans Sauer =

- Born: 11 June 1857; Smithfield, Orange Free State
- Died: 28 August 1939 (aged 82)
- Burial place: Dinant, Belgium
- Spouse: Cecile Josephine

Hans Sauer (11 June 1857 - 28 August 1939) was an Orange Free State born medical doctor, lawyer, adventurer and businessman. He is regarded as a Rand Pioneer, arriving in Johannesburg in 1886 shortly after the discovery of gold and was the town's first district surgeon. He is linked with the creation of Rhodesia.

== Early life and education ==
Johannes Sauer was born in Smithfield, Orange Free State in 1857. He is the brother of J.W. Sauer. His father was the town and district Landdrost. His father, Johannes J. Sauer, moved the family to Aliwal North where he practised law and farming but died in 1870. His mother was Elizabeth W.S.M. Kotzé. Sauer was schooled at Burgersdorp, Cape Colony from 1872 until 1876. After completing school, he was sent to the London to continue his studies at University College London. By October of the same year, he went to Edinburgh to study medicine and graduated in 1881 with a MB and CB.

== Medical career ==
He returned to South Africa in 1882 and headed to Kimberley diamond fields and offered the job as a Quarantine Officer on the Modder River, examining people heading to the town. A year later he left his position and joined Dr. Oskar Sommershield in a hunting trip that took him through the Transvaal and into Mozambique to Lourenco Marques. Leaving that town, they headed back into the Eastern Transvaal to the goldfields of Barberton. At Lydenburg, he met Leander Starr Jameson. He would then return to Kimberley after the outbreak of a smallpox epidemic and remained until 1886.

== Johannesburg ==
In 1886, he was employed by Cecil John Rhodes and Charles Rudd with a 15% share, and he headed to Johannesburg to join the Witwatersrand Gold Rush where Sauer bought up mining claims along the Main Reef on behalf of the men. In a growing mining town, he soon had many interests but his main appointment was on 6 March 1887 as Johannesburg's first district surgeon with friend Ignatius Ferreira sometimes acting as his anaesthetist. Other positions held included chairman of the Diggers Committee, chairman of the Rand Club and a chief consulting surgeon at the new Johannesburg Hospital as well as investing in coal mining in the East Rand to supply fuel to the gold mines. He was involved with the first hospital in the town, an extension of the jail hospital on 1 August 1888 and involved in the new Johannesburg Hospital, a dedicated building that opened on 29 March 1889. He would marry Cecile J. Fitzpatrick in 1890, the sister of Sir Percy Fitzpatrick.

== Rhodesia ==
In 1891 he left Johannesburg and returned to London to study law and take his bar. He would return to Africa by invitation of Rhodes to inspect the potential goldfields in Rhodesia before returning to London where he completed his law degree. He returned to Rhodesia in 1893 as head of the Rhodesian Exploration Company and arrived during the First Matabele War began and would eventually establish himself in Bulawayo. Settled in the town with his wife and family, he bought up land that had been peg out by the war veterans of Rhodes' British South Africa Company and resold it to Rhodes.

== Jameson Raid ==
Sauer was in Johannesburg during the infamous Jameson Raid in December 1895. After the raid failed, he was arrested and imprisoned by the South African Republic but paroled as the Second Matabele War broke out in 1896 and he need to return to Rhodesia to rescue his family. He returned for his trial and was found guilty and sentenced to two years jail and 2000 pounds, but released on its payment.

== Return to Rhodesia ==
He returned to Rhodes in Rhodesia and was present at the surrender of Ndebele warriors to Rhodes and a peace treaty enacted. He and his family resettled in Bulawayo in a suburb named after him. He would continue in the gold mining industry there and become a member of the town's council from 1897–98, its acting mayor in 1898 and founding member of the Bulawayo Club and in the first Rhodesian Legislative Council.

== Personal life ==
Sauer was married to Cecile Josephine, née Fitzpatrick, who had been born in Ireland. Their fourth child, C. P. Fitzgerald (1902–92) became a sinologist and Professor of Far Eastern History at the Australian National University.

== Death ==
He would return to the United Kingdom in 1900 and died in Dinant, Belgium in 1939.

== Legacy ==
In the Johannesburg Central Business District, Sauer Street is named for him. Sauer Town West, a suburb in Bulawayo, is named after him.

== Published works ==
- Ex Africa. G. Bles. 1937.
- The Witwatersrand Goldfield a Vital Asset of the British Empire. Walter E. Skinner. 1933.
