= William Fairbridge =

Rhodesian newspaper publisher and municipal official

- Born: 2 November 1863; Port Elizabeth, South Africa
- Died: 5 October 1943 (aged 80); Montreux, Switzerland
- Education: Bedford Modern School
- Known for: Newspaper Publisher

William Ernest Fairbridge JP (2 November 1863 – 5 October 1943) was a Rhodesian newspaper publisher and municipal official during the early British occupation of Southern Rhodesia. A man, "whose indomitable pluck in the face of endless discouragements deserves an honourable place in the history of journalistic enterprise," he published Rhodesia's first newspaper, the Mashonaland Herald and Zambesian Times in 1891. He also served as the first Mayor of Salisbury in 1897. He subsequently became a leading publishing executive with the Argus group of newspapers in South Africa.

== Early life and career ==
William Ernest Fairbridge was the son of William Alexander Fairbridge of Port Elizabeth. He was born on 2 November 1863 and was educated at Bedford Modern School in England. In 1890 he was appointed by the Argus Group of newspapers as the company's representative in Rhodesia and duly set out on a six-month journey on a scotch cart drawn by oxen from Mafeking to Fort Salisbury.

Undeterred by the absence of even the most rudimentary printing equipment Fairbridge published the first issue of the Mashonaland Herald and Zambesian Times on 27 June 1891. The publication was a hand-written news sheet that was reproduced by a Cyclostyle, or early stenograph, process. Fairbridge had no ink and so had to make it himself. He also had to source paper for each edition as he had brought no supply of his own. He supported the venture by readers' subscriptions which could take the form of a pot of marmalade, a box of candles or an old spade.

Although the Mashonaland Herald was inevitably of variable quality, its success demonstrated the demand for a Rhodesian newspaper. Fairbridge re-launched the Mashonaland Herald as the Rhodesia Herald in 1892. This was a printed newspaper, and he followed this by founding the Bulawayo Chronicle in 1894. Both publications remain as the two longest established newspapers in Zimbabwe

== Municipal and political affairs ==
Fairbridge served as a JP for Rhodesia and in 1897-98 served as the first mayor of Salisbury upon it being granted municipal status, and incorporated the family motto of Discrimine Salus in the town's first coat of arms. From his arrival in Rhodesia in 1891 Fairbridge had been politically active. He was not shy of criticising the British administration and had been forced to tone down his views expressed in the Mashonaland Herald. In 1899 he stood in the first Southern Rhodesian Legislative Council election, but, despite having the inevitable editorial support of his own newspapers, he failed in his bid to be elected as a member of the Mashonaland District.

== Later career and life ==
Fairbridge eventually returned to South Africa to become General Manager of the Argus Newspaper Company and managing director of the Cape Argus. He retired to Switzerland and died at Montreux on 5 October 1943.
