= Tourism in Zimbabwe =

The logo of the Zimbabwe Tourism Authority showing the Victoria Falls and the Zimbabwe Bird found at Great Zimbabwe.

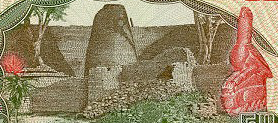
Great Zimbabwe as featured on the defunct $50 note

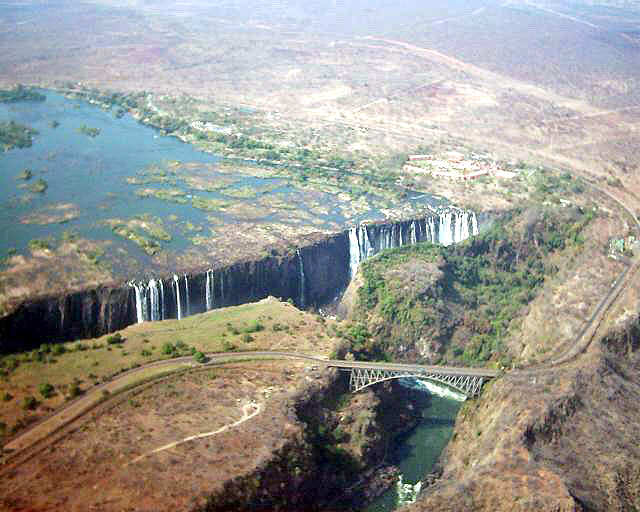
Victoria Falls, the end of the upper Zambezi and beginning of the middle Zambezi

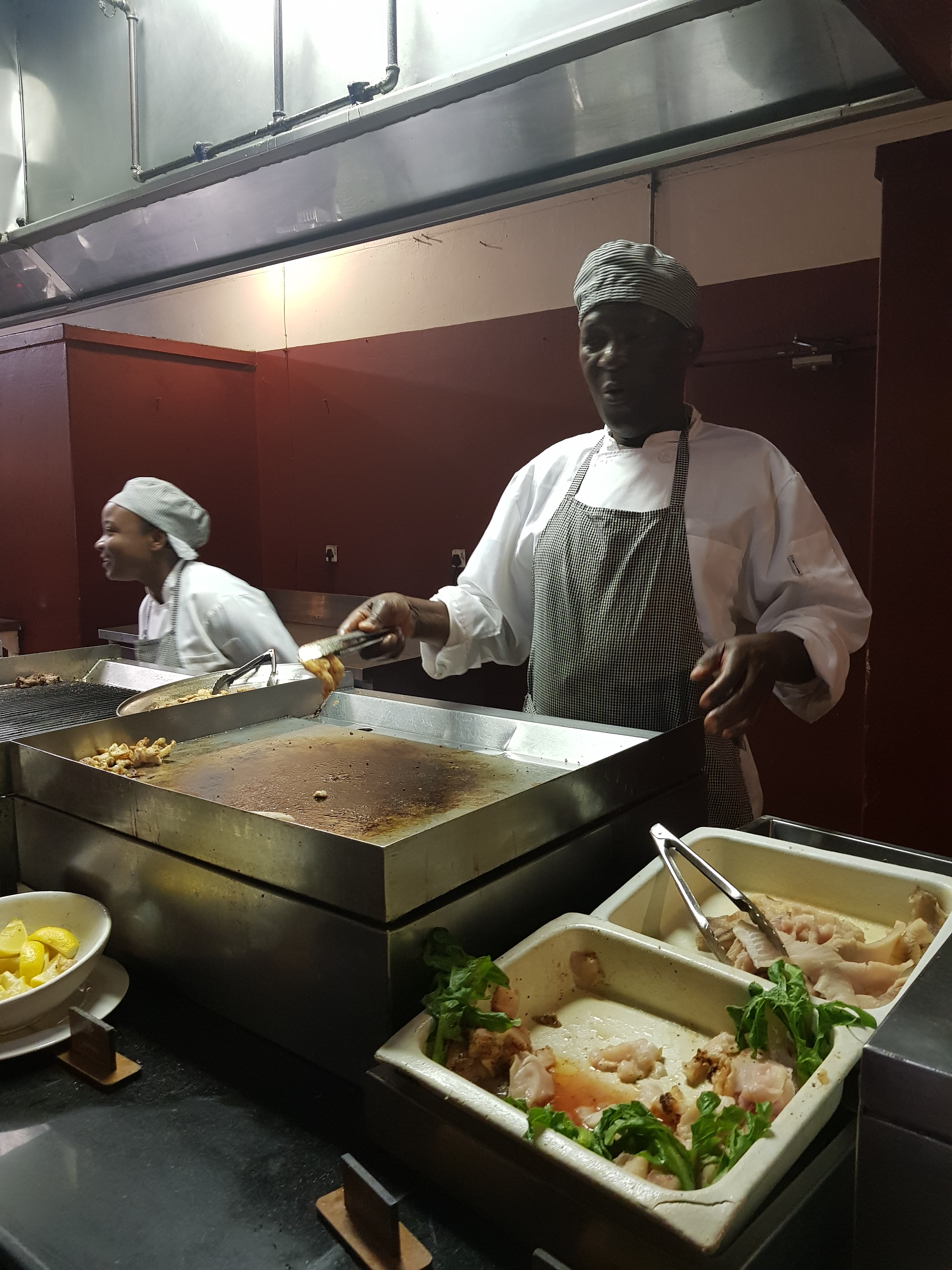
Chefs at the Victoria Falls Hotel

Tourism in Zimbabwe encompasses many attractions, sited across the country. Zimbabwe is home to one of the Seven Natural Wonders of the World, the Victoria Falls. Zimbabwe host eight main National Parks. The largest is Hwange National Park.

The Eastern Highlands are a mountainous area near the Mozambique border. These highlands stretch from Nyanga in the north. The highest peak in Zimbabwe, Mount Nyangani stretches 2593 metres is there. The Bvumba Mountains are further south and the magnificent quartzite Chimanimani range are the southernmost slopes. Mt. Binga is the highest of the Chimanimani peaks. It straddles Mozambique and Zimbabwe. The endemic species of this park attract scientists and hikers. Views from the Nyanga mountains can view places as far away as 60–70 km and on clear days, the town of Rusape can be seen.

Zimbabwe is distinctive in Africa for its large number of medieval city ruins built in a unique dry stone style. The most famous of these are the Great Zimbabwe ruins in Masvingo that survive from the Kingdom of Zimbabwe era. Other ruins include Khami Ruins, Zimbabwe, Dhlo-Dhlo, and Naletale.

The Matobo Hills are an area of granite kopjes and wooded valleys some 35 kilometres south of Bulawayo. The Hills were formed over 2 billion years ago when granite was forced to the surface. This has eroded to produce smooth "whaleback dwalas" and broken kopjes, strewn with boulders and interspersed with thickets of vegetation. Mzilikazi, founder of the Ndebele nation, gave the area its name, meaning 'Bald Heads'. They are linked to historical figures such as Cecil John Rhodes, whose vision led to the foundation of Rhodesia, and other early white colonizers include Leander Starr Jameson and Allan Wilson; most of the members of the Shangani Patrol are buried in these hills at a site named World's View.

Hwange National Park and Mana Pools, a UNESCO World Heritage site, are some of the best National Parks and safari destinations in the region.

The deployment of widespread police roadblocks issuing fines for minor or non-existent infringements has had a negative impact on tourism.

== Arrivals by country ==
In previous years, most visitors arriving to Zimbabwe on short-term basis were from the following countries of nationality:

Country	2017	2016	2015	2014
South Africa	716,234	736,993	744,627	607,616
Malawi	407,006	409,302	320,181	321,874
Zambia	353,214	310,495	327,559	285,727
Mozambique	189,237	171,684	181,435	169,829
Botswana	101,845	94,347	70,354	71,384
United States	101,206	82,699	66,577	57,410
United Kingdom and Ireland	73,552	32,457	53,528	38,606
Germany	37,304	28,929	26,355	24,572
Japan	34,214	22,566	12,713	18,443
Democratic Republic of the Congo	33,811	26,223	26,422	28,368
Total	2,422,930	2,167,686	2,056,588	1,880,028
