= 1899 Southern Rhodesian Legislative Council election =

Legislative Council elections were held in Southern Rhodesia on 17 April 1899. They were the first elections to take place in the colony and followed the Southern Rhodesia Order in Council of 1898 which granted the colony a Legislative Council consisting of at least ten voting members: the Administrator of Southern Rhodesia ex officio, five members nominated by the British South Africa Company, and four members elected by registered voters. The Resident Commissioner of Southern Rhodesia, Sir Marshal James Clarke, also sat on the Legislative Council ex officio but without the right to vote.

== Electoral system ==
The Order in Council did not set any of the regulations governing the election, which were left to the (acting) High Commissioner for Southern Africa to set the qualifications for voters and delimit the electoral districts, which happened in Proclamation no. 17 of 1898. The acting High Commissioner required voters to be British subjects, male, 21 years of age and older, able to write their address and occupation, and then to fulfil the following financial requirements: (a) ownership of a registered mining claim in Southern Rhodesia, or (b) occupying immovable property worth £75, or (c) receiving wages or salary of £50 per annum in Southern Rhodesia. Six months' continuous residence was also required for qualifications b and c. All voters were entered onto a common roll.

With only four members to be elected, the Acting High Commissioner decided to have two districts, Mashonaland and Matabeleland, each returning two members. The election was conducted under rules first set down for Cape Colony in 1892 with a secret ballot. No political parties were in existence at the time of the election so each candidate stood on their own record.

== Results ==
| Constituency Electorate and turnout | Candidate | Votes |
|---|---|---|
| MASHONALAND; 1,420 (c. 85%) | Raleigh Grey | 583 |
| MASHONALAND; 1,420 (c. 85%) | William Paterson Grimmer | 522 |
| MASHONALAND; 1,420 (c. 85%) | William Ernest Fairbridge | 499 |
| MASHONALAND; 1,420 (c. 85%) | Martinus Jacobus Martin | 312 |
| MATABELELAND; 3,187 (72.5%) | Hans Sauer | 1,187 |
| MATABELELAND; 3,187 (72.5%) | Elliott St. Maurice Hutchinson | 1,007 |
| MATABELELAND; 3,187 (72.5%) | Charles Theodore Holland | 797 |
| MATABELELAND; 3,187 (72.5%) | Samuel John Lewis | 668 |

=== By-election ===
William Fairbridge, defeated in Mashonaland, lodged an election petition after the declaration of the result, alleging that Raleigh Grey's election agents were involved in misconduct during the election. Before the hearing commenced, Grey resigned from the Council feeling that his presence was corrupted. The election court found that Grey's agents had indulged in bribery and 'treating' (providing free food and drink for voters) at a smoking concert, and invalidated his earlier election, but as Grey was no longer a member, this had no effect.

In the meantime, nominations for the byelection closed on August 21, 1899 and Grey was again nominated. With no other candidate in the field he was therefore returned unopposed.

=== Nominated members ===
The members nominated by the British South Africa Company were:

- Mr Justice Joseph Vintcent, Senior Judge of the High Court (provisionally)
- Sir Thomas Charles Scanlen KCMG, Legal Adviser
- Joseph Millerd Orpen, Surveyor-General
- Townshend Griffin, Commissioner of Mines and Public Works
- Herbert Hayton Castens, Chief Secretary

Sir Thomas Scanlen stood down and was replaced by John Gilbert Kotzé, Attorney General, on August 9, 1900. Mr Justice Vintcent stood down and was replaced by Clarkson Henry Tredgold on June 28, 1901. Townshend Griffin was absent for a time and was replaced by James Hutchinson Kennedy on June 28, 1901.
