= Israel–Zimbabwe relations =

- Israel: Zimbabwe

Israel–Zimbabwe relations refers to foreign relations between Israel and Zimbabwe. Neither country has a resident ambassador.

== History ==
Israel did not originally support Rhodesia's Unilateral Declaration of Independence from the United Kingdom in 1965. Later that same year, it called the new Rhodesian regime illegal.

However, by the 1970s Israel's attitude toward Rhodesia changed. Rhodesia was largely under international sanctions due to its racist and timocratic nature. Israel, like Portugal and others, did not participate in the sanctions. During the 1970s, Israel sold weapons and military equipment to the white government of Rhodesia during the Rhodesian Bush War, eventually granting them a license to manufacture their own.

Rhodesia became Zimbabwe Rhodesia in 1979, then Zimbabwe in 1980. The new Zimbabwean government under Robert Mugabe supported the PLO under Yasser Arafat during the 1980s, and formally established relations with the PLO in March 1983. Israeli relations with South Africa in the 1970s led to Zimbabwe's verbal support for the PLO and comparisons of Zionism to apartheid. The state-run publication, The Herald, questioned the legitimacy of Israel's existence. In October 1983, Abel Muzorewa, the former Prime Minister of Zimbabwe Rhodesia, visited Israel. He urged Robert Mugabe to establish diplomatic relations, saying his political policies hurt Zimbabwe's agriculture and technology industries. Muzorewa was imprisoned that year for alleged conspiracy with Israel and South Africa.

Israel and Zimbabwe established formal diplomatic relations in 1993. In 2001, the Zimbabwean government voiced support for a two-state solution to the Israeli–Palestinian conflict.

On November 10, 2023, religious leaders in Zimbabwe called for Israeli's military operations in Gaza to end and for "the enforcement of an immediate ceasefire. Previously, on November 2, Christopher Mutsvangwa, the official spokesperson of the ZANU-PF political bureau, criticized Israeli military actions in Gaza as "cruel and heinous bombing" and a "genocide against...the Palestinian[s]", and added that the ZANU-PF affirmed "support for the Palestinian people" and criticized Israel for "not committing to the two-state solution" and for other actions.

== Commercial relations ==
Zimbabwe is not a party to boycotts on Israel. In March 2002, an Israeli company sold riot control vehicles to the Mugabe government. In 2008, a Zimbabwean business delegation visited Israel for a week to explore new trade opportunities in the spheres of agriculture, telecommunications, cosmetics and solar energy. The tour was organized by the Christian Friends of Israel Zimbabwe.

At a meeting in Tel Aviv in June 2010, Israel declared its support for Zimbabwe's inclusion in the Kimberley Process Certification Scheme, stating that Zimbabwe is capable of supplying nearly a quarter of the global demand for diamonds.

In 2015, Israel's exports to Zimbabwe totaled US$7.14 million, while Zimbabwe exported almost exclusively diamonds to Israel for US$13.8 million in the same year.

== See also ==
- History of the Jews in Zimbabwe
- International recognition of Israel
