= Pre-colonial history of Zimbabwe =

The pre-colonial history of Zimbabwe lasted until the British government granted colonial status to Southern Rhodesia in 1923.

== Ancient civilization ==
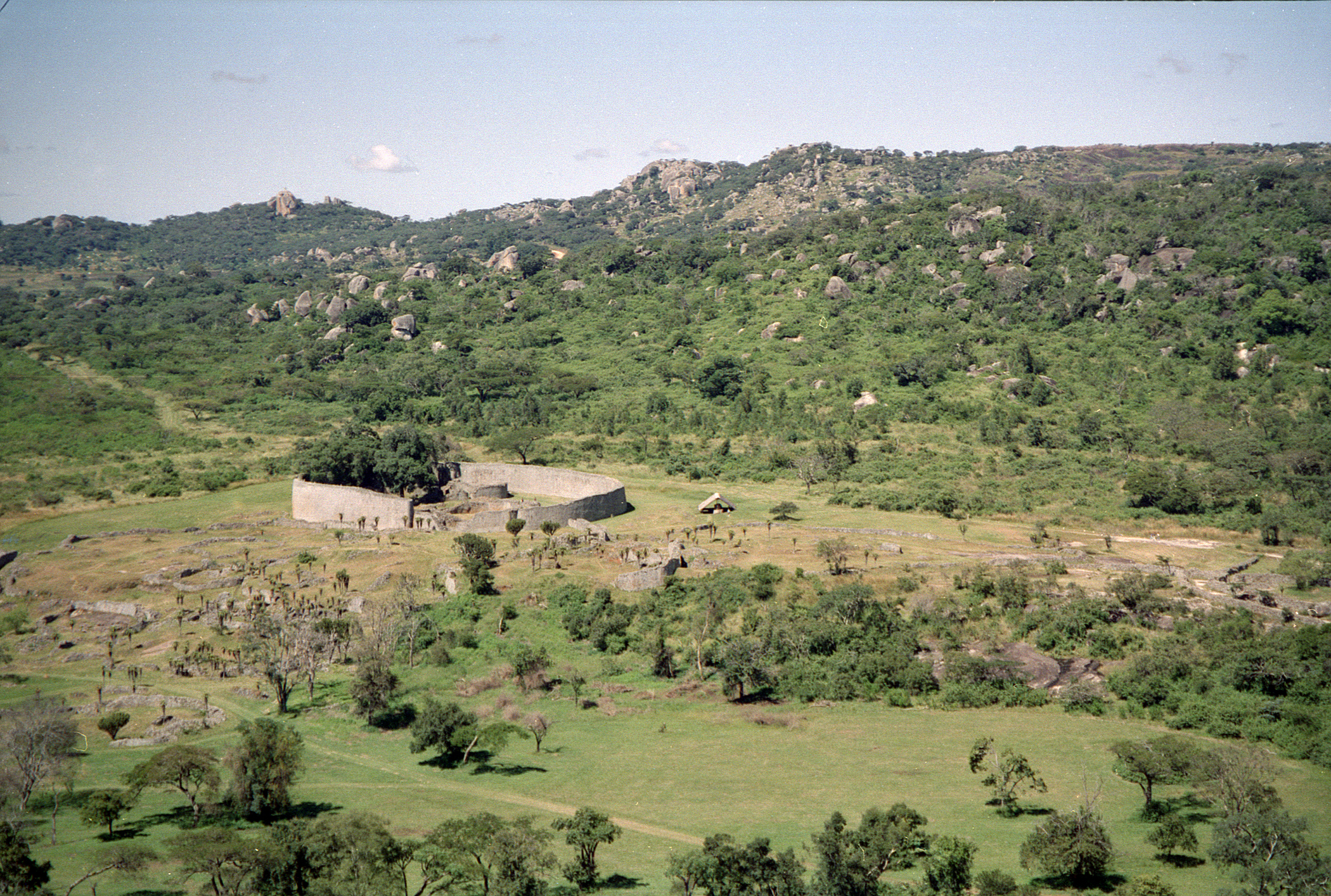
The Great Zimbabwe national monument

Archaeologists have found Stone-Age implements, Khoisan cave paintings, arrowheads, pottery, and pebble tools in several areas of Zimbabwe, a suggestion of human habitation for thousands of years, and the ruins of stone buildings provide evidence of more recent civilization.

The most impressive of these sites is the Great Zimbabwe ruins, after which the country is named, located near Masvingo. Evidence suggests that these stone structures were built around the 11th century CE by indigenous Africans. Great Zimbabwe's power peaked from 1300 to 1450 CE, with gold mining from the inland regions connecting into the trade networks of the Indian Ocean via Kilwa and Sofala. Estimates of Great Zimbabwe's peak population around this time range from 10,000 to 20,000. The reasons for the decline of Great Zimbabwe are unclear, with oral traditions suggesting a salt shortage was to blame, though this may be a mythological explanation. Later European explorers, convinced of African inferiority but impressed by the scale of the stoneworks, hypothesized that these great stoneworks must have been created by previous colonizers from North Africa or West Asia.

The Mapungubwe people, a Bantu-speaking group of migrants from present-day South Africa, inhabited the Great Zimbabwe site from about AD 1000 - 1550, intermarrying with san bushmen people the native shona talk of this as the story of the tavara being the bantu and shava being the bushmen . From about 1100, the fortress took shape, reaching its peak by the fifteenth century. These were the ancestors of the Kalanga and Karanga people. The Royal Totem was Moyo. Today bearers of the Moyo Totem are found amongst The Kalanga people in Zimbabwe and Botswana as well as the Karanga people in the Masvingo area. According to Prof. Thomas Huffman (chairman of the wits school of Archeology, Geography and Environmental Studies), Kalanga was the language of the Mapungubwe Kingdom, which predates the Great Zimbabwe kingdom. He further suggests that the Karanga dialect could have emerged from Kalanga as a result of influence from Zezuru. However some researchers insist that Kalanga is a derivative of Karanga. They believe that Kalanga must have emerged as a result of the corruption of the Karanga dialect by invading Ndebele. The later seems less likely if one considers that Kalanga is spoken in areas where the invading Ndebele did not penetrate. Unadulterated Kalanga is still spoken in Shoshong Botswana, where ruins similar to Great Zimbabwe are found. Other ruins similar to Great Zimbabwe are found in Masvingo, Khami, Dlodlo, and other areas where Kalanga is still the language spoken by the local communities. The self-designations Kalanga and Karanga are the same word pronounced differently because of the lexical shift of r to l characteristic of how the languages are related to each other.

== Early Modern civilisations ==
There have been many civilizations in Zimbabwe as is shown by the ancient stone structures at Khami, Great Zimbabwe, and Dhlo-Dhlo. The first major civilization to become established as the Mwene Mutapa (or Monomotapas), who was said to have built Great Zimbabwe, in the ruins of which was found the soapstone bird that features on the Zimbabwean flag. By the mid-1440s, King Mutota's empire included almost all of the Zimbabwean plateau and extensive parts of what is now Mozambique. The wealth of this empire was based on small-scale industries, for example, iron smelting, textiles, gold, and copper, along with agriculture. The regular inhabitants of the empire's trading towns were the Swahili merchants with whom trade was conducted.

Later they formed the Rozwi Empire, which continued until the nineteenth century.

== Ndebele invasion ==
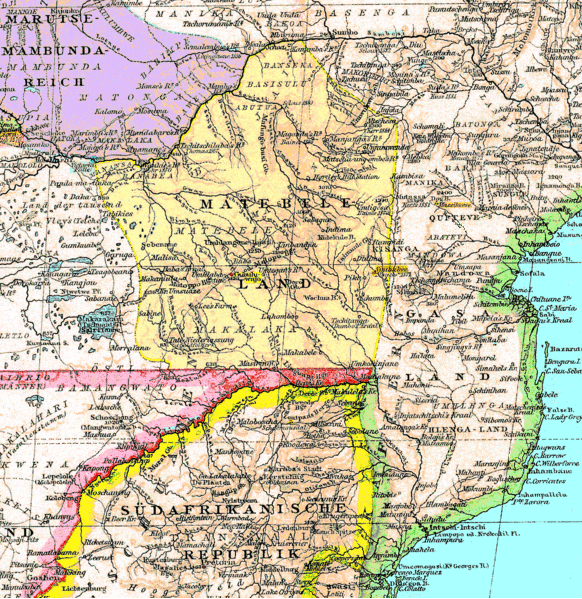
Matabeleland, 1887

The Matabele (Ndebele) people in the south arrived in 1834 with capeverd coloured community that United to defeat the shona who were well equipped with cannons and guns acquired by their trade with the Portuguese -- Mzilikazi fleeing Shaka.

Europeans only settled in Zimbabwe in the 1920s due to many difficulties caused by disease and World War I; before that, from the 1890s to 1910s, there were only British officers and immediate family who lived in cabins and village town houses .

== See also ==
- Nehanda Nyakasikana
- Mapungubwe
- Khami
- Kalanga
- tjiKalanga
