= List of ecoregions in Zimbabwe =

The following is a list of ecoregions in Zimbabwe, according to the Worldwide Fund for Nature (WWF).

== Terrestrial ecoregions ==
by major habitat type

=== Tropical and subtropical grasslands, savannas, and shrublands ===
- Kalahari Acacia-Baikiaea woodlands
- Southern Africa bushveld
- Southern miombo woodlands
- Zambezian Baikiaea woodlands
- Zambezian and mopane woodlands

=== Montane grasslands and shrublands ===
- Eastern Zimbabwe montane forest-grassland mosaic

== Freshwater ecoregions ==
by bioregion

=== Zambezi ===
- Zambezian Lowveld
- Zambezi
  - Mulanje
  - Eastern Zimbabwe Highlands
  - Zambezian (Plateau) Highveld
  - Middle Zambezi Luangwa
