= History of the Jews in Zimbabwe =

Zimbabwean Jews
Total population
- 6,845 (2022 census)

Languages
- English, Hebrew, Yiddish

Religion
- Judaism

Related ethnic groups
- South African Jews

The location of Zimbabwe in Africa

The history of the Jews in Zimbabwe reaches back to the 19th century. Present-day Zimbabwe was formerly known as Southern Rhodesia and later as Rhodesia. The community peaked in 1961, numbering 7,060.

== History ==
During the 19th century, Ashkenazi Jews from Russian Empire Ukrainian Polish Russia and Belarusian Lithuania settled in Rhodesia after the area had been colonized by the British, and became active in the trading industry. In 1894, the first synagogue was established in a tent in Bulawayo. The second community developed in Salisbury (later renamed Harare) in 1895. A third congregation was established in Gwelo in 1901. By 1900, approximately 300 Jews lived in Rhodesia.

In the 1930s a number of Sephardic Jews arrived in Rhodesia from the Greek island of Rhodes and mainly settled in Salisbury. This was followed by another wave in the 1960s when Jews fled the Belgian Congo. A Sephardic Jewish Community Synagogue was established in Salisbury in the 1950s.

In the late 1930s, German Jews fleeing Nazi persecution settled in the colony. In 1943, the Rhodesian Zionist Council and the Rhodesian Jewish Board of Deputies were established, later being renamed the Central African Zionist Council and Central African Board of Jewish Deputies in 1946. After World War II, Jewish immigrants arrived from South Africa and the United Kingdom. By 1961, the Jewish population peaked at 7,060.

Both Orthodox and Progressive congregations emerged. Bulawayo Progressive Jewish Congregation was founded by Rabbi Moses Cyrus Weiler in 1958 and led by rabbi Curtis Cassell from West London Synagogue between 1957 and 1977. Both the Progressive and Orthodox congregation (Bulawayo Hebrew Congregation) merged in 1977.

In the first half of the 20th century there was a high level of assimilation by Rhodesian Jews into Rhodesian society, and intermarriage rates were high. Roy Welensky, the second and last Prime Minister of the Federation of Rhodesia and Nyasaland, was the son of a Lithuanian Jewish father and an Afrikaner mother. By 1957, one out of every seven Jews who married in Rhodesia married a Gentile.

In addition to the Rhodesian Zionist Council and the Rhodesian Jewish Board of Deputies the Jewish Community developed institutions to serve and strengthen the community including two Jewish Day Schools (one in Harare called Sharon School and one in Bulawayo called Carmel School), community centers, Jewish Cemeteries, Zionist youth movements, Jewish owned sports clubs, Savyon Old Age Home in Bulawayo and several women's organisations. A number of Jews from Zionist youth movements emigrated to Israel.

In 1965, the white minority government of Southern Rhodesia, under Prime Minister Ian Smith, unilaterally declared independence as Rhodesia, in response to British demands that the colony be handed over to Black majority rule. Rhodesia was then subject to international sanctions, and black nationalist organizations began an insurgency, known as the Rhodesian Bush War, which lasted until 1979, when the Rhodesian government agreed to settle with the black nationalists. By the time the Rhodesian Bush War ended in 1979, most of the country's Jewish population had emigrated, along with many other whites.

Some Jews chose to stay behind when the country was transferred to black majority rule and renamed Zimbabwe in 1980. However, emigration continued, and by 1987, 1,200 Jews out of a peak population of about 7,000 remained. Most Rhodesian Jews emigrated to Israel or South Africa, seeking better economic conditions and Jewish marriage prospects. Until the late 1990s, rabbis resided in Harare and Bulawayo, but left as the economy and community began to decline. Today there is no resident Rabbi.

In 1992, President Robert Mugabe caused upset to the Jewish community in Zimbabwe when he remarked that "[white] commercial farmers are hard-hearted people, you would think they were Jews".

In 2002, after the Jewish community's survival was threatened by a food shortage and poverty in the country, the mayor of Ashkelon, a city in southern Israel, invited Zimbabwean Jews to immigrate to Israel and offered assistance in settling in Ashkelon. Several Zimbabwean Jews accepted his offer.

In 2003 the Bulawayo Shul burned down and the small community did not restore the building. Prayers are generally held at the Sinai Hall or Savyon Lodge in Bulawayo. In Harare the Sephardic Community has its own synagogue, and the Ashkenazi Community has a separate synagogue. Today because of small numbers of congregants the prayers alternate between the two synagogues.

Today, about 200 Jews live in Zimbabwe, chiefly in Harare and Bulawayo. There are no Jews remaining in Kwekwe, Gweru, and Kadoma. Two-thirds of Zimbabwean Jews are over 65 years of age. The last bar mitzvah took place in 2006.

Jewish population of Zimbabwe
Year	Pop.	±% p.a.
1894	20	—
1900	300	+57.04%
1921	1,289	+7.19%
1936	2,219	+3.69%
1947	2,021	−0.85%
1951	4,760	+23.88%
1961	7,061	+4.02%
1980	1,550	−7.67%
1987	1,200	−3.59%
1989	1,168	−1.34%
2001	800	−3.10%
2004	400	−20.63%
2006	99	−50.25%
2014	120	+2.43%
2019	200	+10.76%

== Lemba people ==
The Lemba people speak the Bantu languages spoken by their geographic neighbours and resemble them physically, but they have some religious practices and beliefs similar to those in Judaism and Islam, which they claim were transmitted by oral tradition. They have a tradition of ancient Jewish or South Arabian descent through their male line. Genetic Y-DNA analyses in the 2000s have established a partially Middle-Eastern origin for a portion of the male Lemba population. More recent research argues that DNA studies do not support claims for a specifically Jewish genetic heritage.

== See also ==
- History of the Jews in Africa

=== Regions ===
- History of the Jews in Central Africa
- History of the Jews in East Africa
- History of the Jews in North Africa
- History of the Jews in Southern Africa
- History of the Jews in West Africa

=== Topics ===
- Israel–Zimbabwe relations
