= Military history of Zimbabwe =

Modern Zimbabwe

The military history of Zimbabwe chronicles a vast time period and complex events from the dawn of history until the present time. It covers invasions of native peoples of Africa (Shona and Ndebele), encroachment by Europeans (Portuguese, Boer and British settlers), and civil conflict.

== Early history ==
=== San and invasion by ironworking cultures ===
Stone Age evidence indicates that the San people, now living mostly in the Kalahari Desert, are the ancestors of this region's original inhabitants, almost 3,000 years ago. There are also remnants of several ironworking cultures dating back to AD 300. Little is known of the early ironworkers, but it is believed that they put pressure on the San and gradually took over the land.

=== Shona rule ===
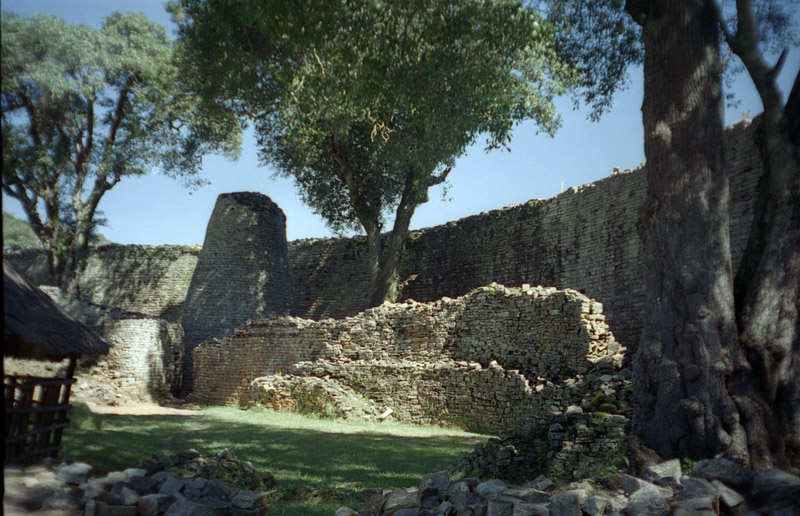
Great Zimbabwe: Tower in the Great Enclosure.

Around the 4th century the Bantu-speaking Shona (Gokomere, Sotho-Tswana and related tribes) arrived from the north and both the San and the early ironworkers were driven out. By the 15th century, the Shona had established a strong empire, known as the Munhumutapa Empire (also called Monomotapa or Mwene Mutapa Empire), with its capital at the ancient city of Zimbabwe -- Great Zimbabwe. This empire ruled territory now falling within the modern states of Zimbabwe (which took its name from this city) and Mozambique, but the empire was split by the end of the 15th century with southern part becoming the Urozwi Empire.

The Portuguese began their attempts to subdue the Shona states as early as 1505 but were confined to the coast until 1513. The empire finally collapsed in 1629 and later became the rozvi empire. Remnants of the government established another Mutapa kingdom in Mozambique sometimes called Karanga, who reigned in the region until 1902.

=== Mfecane ===
Mfecane (Zulu), also known as the Difaqane or Lifaqane (Sesotho), is an African expression which means something like "the crushing" or "scattering". It describes a period of widespread chaos and disturbance in southern Africa during the period between 1815 and about 1835 which resulted from the rise to power of Shaka, the Zulu king and military leader who conquered the Nguni peoples between the Tugela and Pongola rivers in the beginning of the nineteenth century, and created a militaristic kingdom in the region. The Mfecane also led to the formation and consolidation of other groups – such as the Ndebele Kingdom, the Mfengu and the Makololo – and the creation of states such as the modern Lesotho.

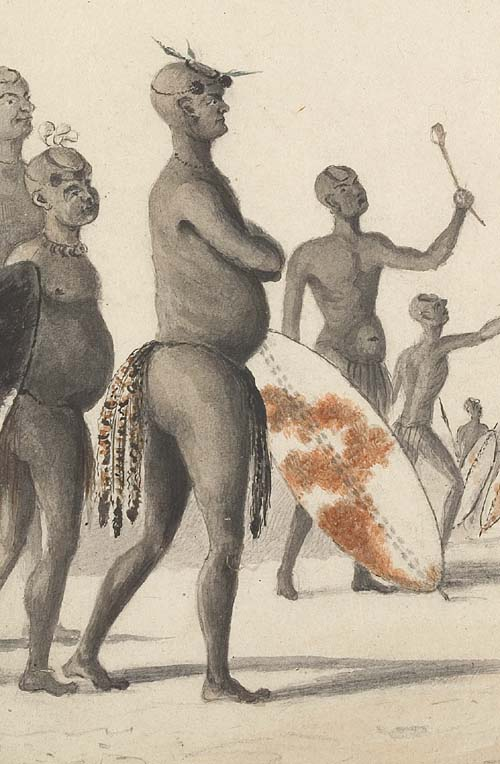
Mzilikazi Kumalo

In 1817, Mzilikazi arrived at the Kalanga and Lozwi regions were by Mzilikazi, originally a lieutenant of Zulu King Shaka who was pushed from his own territories to the west by the Zulu armies. After a brief alliance with the Transvaal Ndebele, Mzilikazi became leader of the Ndebele people. Many of the kalanga, and Lozwi people were incorporated and the rest were either made satellite territories who paid taxes to the Ndebele Kingdom. He called his new nation Mthwakazi (which the British later called Matabeleland), a name derived from the original settlers the San people called aba Thwa (The Ndebele called themselves Matabele, but because of linguistic differences, were called Ndebele by the local Sotho-Tswana.) Mzilikazi's invasion of the Transvaal was one part of a vast series of inter-related wars, forced migrations and famines that indigenous people and later historians came to call the Mfecane. In the Transvaal, the Mfecane severely weakened and disrupted the towns and villages of the Sotho-Tswana chiefdoms, their political systems and economies, making them very weak, and easy to colonize by the European settlers who would shortly arrive from the south.

As Ndebele moved into Transvaal, the remnants of the Bavenda retreated north to the Waterberg and Zoutpansberg, while Mzilikazi made his chief kraal north of the Magaliesberg mountains near present-day Pretoria, with an important military outpost to guard trade routes to the north at Mosega, not far from the site of the modern town of Zeerust. From about 1827 until about 1836, Mzilikazi dominated the southwestern Transvaal. Before that time the region between the Vaal and Limpopo was scarcely known to Europeans, but in 1829, Mzilikazi was visited at Mosega by Robert Moffat, and between that date and 1836 a few British traders and explorers visited the country and made known its principal features.

=== Boer confrontations ===
In the 1830s and 1840s, white descendants of Dutch pioneers, collectively known as voortrekkers or trekboers, departed Cape Colony with hundreds of their dependents to escape British rule. This exodus, in what came to be called the Great Trek, often pitted the migrant settlers against local forces and resulted in the formation of short-lived Boer republics. Between 1835 and 1838, the trekkers began crossing the Vaal River and skirmishing with Ndebele regiments. On 16 October 1836, a Boer column under Hendrik Potgieter was attacked by a Ndebele force numbering some 5,000. They succeeded in seizing Potgieter's livestock, but were unable to penetrate his laager. One of the Tswana chiefs, Moroko, later convinced Potgieter to pull his wagons back to the safety of Thaba-Nchu - where his men could seek food and protection. In January 1837, over a hundred Boers and around sixty Tswana returned with a vengeance. Led by Potgieter and Gerrit Maritz, they raided Mzilikazi's settlement at Mosega and drove him across the Limpopo River. Prominent voortrekkers immediately claimed the territory which Mzilikazi had forfeited, and later arrivals continued to push deeper into the Transvaal.

Voortrekker parties harassed Mzilikazi as late as 1851, but the following year burghers of the South African Republic finally negotiated a lasting peace. However, gold was discovered near Mthwakazi in 1867 and Europe's colonial powers became increasingly interested in the region. Mzilikazi died in 1868, near Bulawayo. His son, Lobengula, granted several concessions to European traders, including the 1888 Rudd treaty giving Cape imperialist Cecil Rhodes exclusive mineral rights in much of the lands east of Matabeleland. Gold was already known to exist in nearby Mashonaland, so with the Rudd concession Rhodes obtained a royal charter to form the British South Africa Company in 1889.

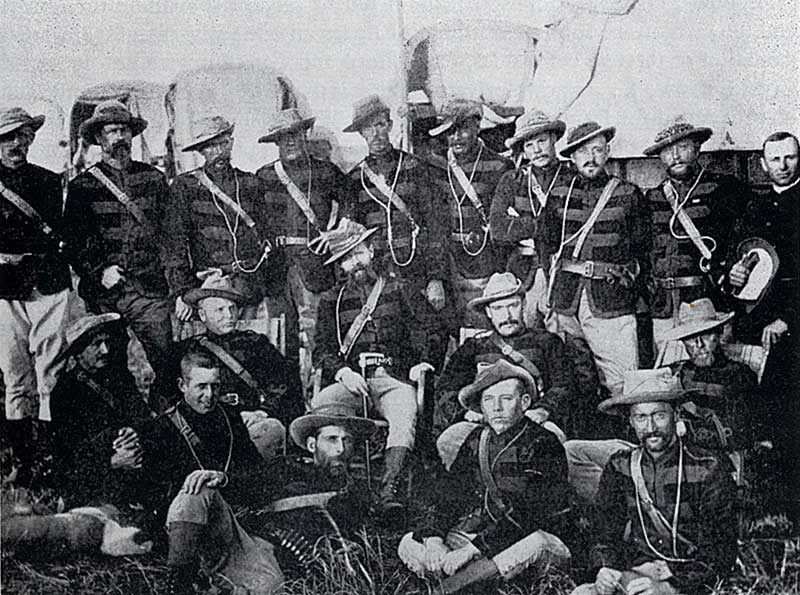
Officers of the Pioneer Column

=== Pioneer Column ===
In 1890, Rhodes sent a group of settlers, known as the Pioneer Column, into Mashonaland. The 400+ man Pioneer Column was guided by the explorer and big game hunter Frederick Selous and was officially designated the British South Africa Company Police (BSACP) accompanied by about 100 Bechuanaland Border Police (BBP). When they reached Harari Hill, they founded Fort Salisbury (now Harare). Rhodes had been distributing land to the settlers even before the royal charter, but the charter legitimized his further actions with the British government. By 1891 an Order-in-Council declared Matabeleland, Mashonaland, and Bechuanaland a British protectorate. By 1892, the number of men in the force had decreased and the BSACP was replaced by a number of volunteer forces - the Mashonaland Horse, the Mashonaland Mounted Police and the Mashonaland Constabulary, and later additions of Salisbury Horse, Victoria Rangers, and Raaf's Rangers. The BSACP was later renamed the British South Africa Police (BSAP) and this force stayed together for much of the 20th century.

Rhodes had a vested interest in the continued expansion of white settlements in the region, so now with the cover of a legal mandate, he used a brutal attack by Ndebele against the Shona near Fort Victoria (now Masvingo) in 1893 as a pretense for attacking the kingdom of Lobengula.

== First Matabele War ==
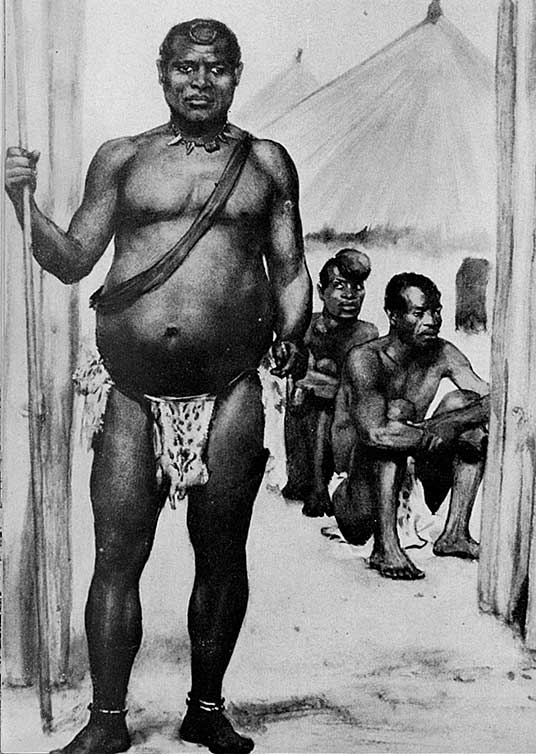
Lobengula Kumalo

The first battle in the war occurred on 5 November 1893 when a British laager was attacked by the Matabele on open ground a few miles from the Impembisi River. The laager consisted of 670 British soldiers, 400 of whom were mounted along with a small force of native allies fought off the Imbezu and Ingubu regiments computed by Sir John Willoughby to number 1,700 warriors in all. The laager had with it a small artillery of five Maxim gun, two seven-pounders, one Gardner gun, and one Hotchkiss. The Maxim guns took center stage and decimated the native force. Other African regiments were in the immediate vicinity, estimated at 5,000 men, however this force never took part in the fighting.

Lobengula had 80,000 spearmen and 20,000 riflemen, against fewer than 700 soldiers of the British South Africa Police, but the Ndebele warriors were no match against the British Maxim guns. Leander Starr Jameson immediately sent his troops to Bulawayo to try to capture Lobengula, but the king escaped and left Bulawayo in ruins behind him. The group of white settlers was sent to find Lobengula along the Shangani river, which they did, but nearly all members of this patrol were killed in battle on the Shangani river in Matabeleland in 1893. The incident achieved a lasting, prominent place in Rhodesian colonial history as the Shangani Patrol and is roughly the British equivalent to Custer's Last Stand. But this was no victory for the Ndebele. Under somewhat mysterious circumstances, King Lobengula died in January 1894, and within a few short months the British South Africa Company controlled most of the Matabeleland and white settlers continued to arrive.

== Jameson Raid ==
The Jameson Raid (29 December 1895 – 2 January 1896) was a raid on Paul Kruger's Transvaal Republic carried out by Leander Starr Jameson and his Rhodesian and Bechuanaland policemen over the New Year weekend of 1895–96. It was intended to trigger an uprising by the primarily British expatriate workers (known as Uitlanders) in the Transvaal but failed to do so. The raid was ineffective and no uprising took place, but it did much to bring about the Second Boer War and the Second Matabele War.

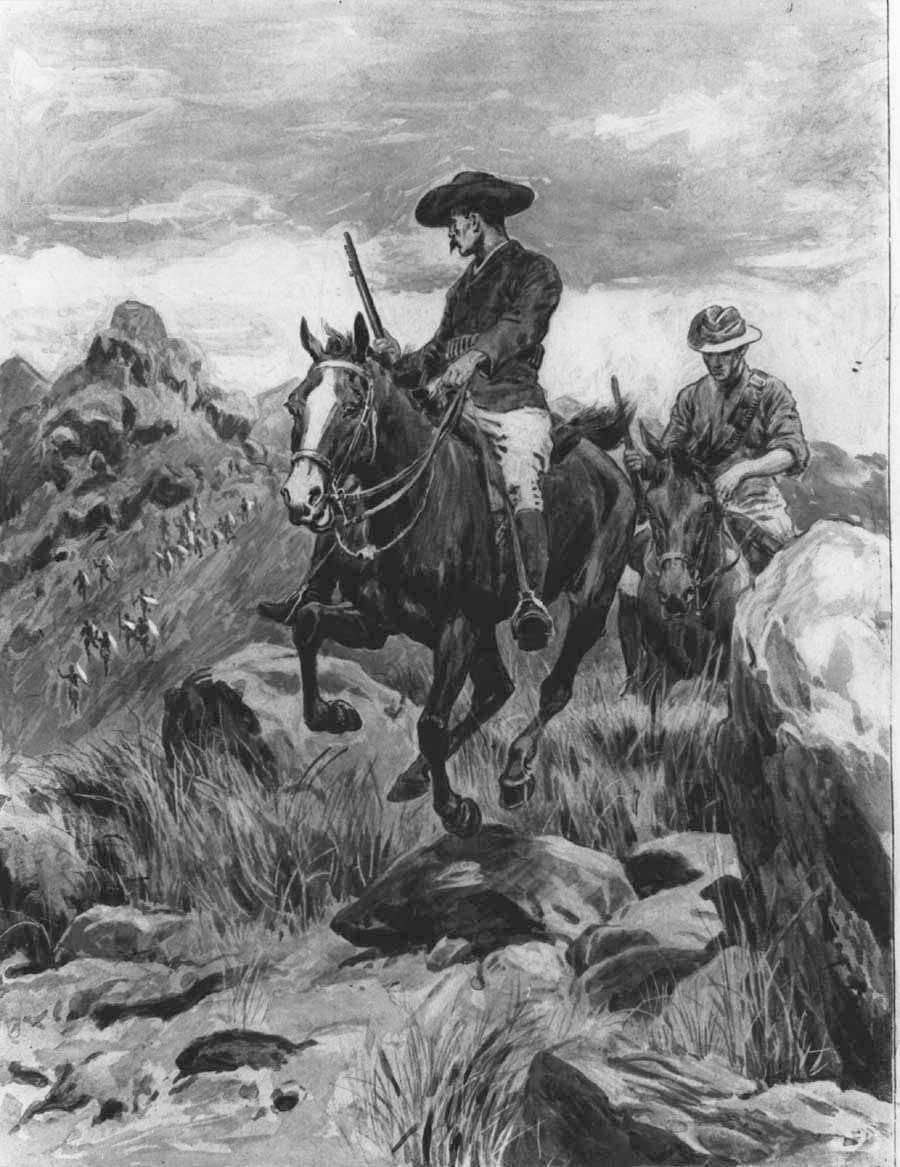
Burnham & Armstrong after the assassination of Mlimo

== Second Matabele War ==
The Second Matabele War—or the First Chimurenga, as it is often called in modern Zimbabwe—comprised revolts against British South Africa Company rule by the Ndebele and Shona peoples during 1896 and 1897.

According to UNESCO General History of Africa - VII Africa under Colonial Domination 1880-1935, the "Chimurenga, as the Shona termed their form of armed resistance, began in March 1896 in Matabeleland and June in Mashonaland. The first casualty was an African policeman employed by the British South Africa Company, killed 20 March. The first attack upon Europeans occurred in the town of Essexvale on 22 March, when seven Europeans and two Africans were killed.... Within a week, 130 Europeans had been killed in Matabeleland. Africans were armed with Martini-Henry rifles, Lee Metfords, elephant guns, muskets and blunderbusses, as well as with the traditional spears, axes, knobkerries and bows and arrows".

Mlimo, the Ndebele spiritual/religious leader, is credited with fomenting much of the anger that led to this confrontation. He convinced the Ndebele and Shona that the white settlers (almost 4,000 strong by then) were responsible for the drought, locust plagues and the cattle disease rinderpest ravaging the country at the time. Mlimo's call to battle was well timed. Only a few months earlier, the British South Africa Company's Administrator General for Matabeleland, Leander Starr Jameson, had sent most of his troops and armaments to fight the Transvaal Republic in the Jameson Raid. This left the country's defences in disarray. The Ndebele began their revolt in March 1896, and in June 1896 they were joined by the Shona.

The British South Africa Company immediately sent troops to suppress the Ndebele and the Shona, but it took months for the British to relieve their major colonial fortifications under siege by native warriors. Mlimo was eventually assassinated in his temple in Matobo Hills by the American scout Frederick Russell Burnham. Upon learning of the death of Mlimo, Cecil Rhodes boldly walked unarmed into the native's stronghold and persuaded the impi to lay down their arms. The war thus ended in October 1897.

== Rhodesian Bush War ==
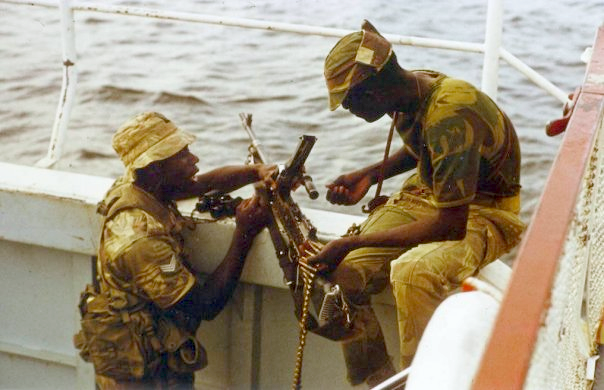
Soldiers of the Rhodesian African Rifles aboard a patrol boat on Lake Kariba, December 1976. Most of the government's Security Forces were black, but some units were all white.

The Rhodesian Bush War, also called the Second Chimurenga or the Zimbabwe War of Liberation, refers to the guerrilla war of 1966–1979 which led to the end of Rhodesia and the de jure independence of Zimbabwe. It was a three-way conflict between the predominantly white minority government of Ian Smith and the Rhodesian Front and two rival black nationalist movements: the Maoist Zimbabwe African National Union (ZANU), led by Robert Mugabe, drew its support mostly from the Shona people, while the Marxist Zimbabwe African People's Union (ZAPU) of Joshua Nkomo was mostly supported by Ndebele. movements, led by Robert Mugabe and Joshua Nkomo respectively.

=== Overview ===
With the breakup of Federation of Rhodesia and Nyasaland in 1964 the army underwent a large- scale reorganization by the British. In 1965, Southern Rhodesia took matters into its own hands in 1965 with a "Unilateral Declaration of Independence" (UDI). From April 1966 onwards groups of Soviet-supported guerrillas infiltrated Rhodesia from neighbouring Zambia in steadily increasing numbers, with the goal of overthrowing the white-rule government, but the Second Chimurenga is generally considered to have started in earnest on 21 December 1972 when an attack took place on a farm in the Centenary District, with further attacks on other farms in the following days.

As the guerrilla activity increased in 1973 "Operation Hurricane" started and the military prepared itself for war. During 1974 a major effort by the security forces resulted in many guerrillas being killed and the number inside the country reduced to less than 100. However, a second front in the Second Chumerenga emerged in 1974 when the Portugal withdrew from its colonly of Mozambique.

In 1976 Operations "Thrasher" and "Repulse" started in order to contain the ever-increasing influx of guerrillas. At the same time rivalry between the two main guerrilla factions increased and resulted in open fighting in the training camps in Tanzania, with over 600 deaths. The Soviets increased their influence and began to take a more active role in the training and control of the Zimbabwe People's Revolutionary Army (ZIPRA) guerrillas. Perhaps too late, the Rhodesians decided to take the war to the enemy, and cross-border operations, which had started in 1976 with a raid on a major base in Mozambique in which the Rhodesians had killed over 1,200 guerrillas and captured huge amounts of weapons, were stepped up. In 1977, Operation "Dingo" was a major raid on large guerrilla camps such as Chimoio and Tembue in Mozambique which resulted in thousands of guerrilla deaths and the capture of supplies sorely needed by the Rhodesians.

In September 1978, the guerrillas again took the offensive by shooting down a Rhodesian airliner Air Rhodesia Flight 825 with a SAM-7 missile. Ten civilians who survived the crash were subsequently massacred at the crash site by ZIPRA guerrillas, increasing calls for massive retaliation by the Rhodesian security forces. On October of that same year, the Rhodesian Air Force launched the daring "Green Leader" attack on a ZIPRA camp outside Lusaka, the Rhodesian fighters completely taking over Zambian air space for the duration of the raid. On 12 February 1979 as the war increased even more in intensity, another civilian airliner Air Rhodesia Flight 827 was hit by another shoulder-fired missile; all 59 passengers and crew were killed when the aircraft turned into a huge fireball.

=== Rhodesian Light Infantry ===
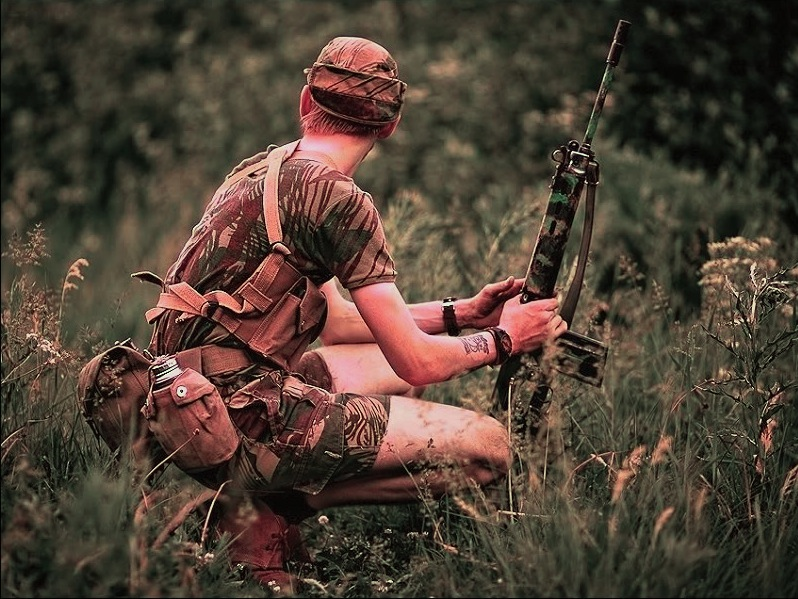
A re-enactor depicts a Rhodesian Light Infantry trooper of the 1970s

The Rhodesian Light Infantry (RLI) was at the forefront of the Rhodesian war. It was a regular army infantry regiment in the Rhodesian army, composed only of white recruits. The battalion was organised into four company size sub-units called 'Commandos'; 1, 2, 3 and Support Commando. In theory each commando had five 'Troops' (platoon size structures), though much of the time there were only four. The average fighting strength of a Commando was about 70. The rank structure was; Trooper, Lance-corporal, Corporal, Sergeant etc. All ranks were called 'troopies' by the Rhodesian media.

The RLI's most characteristic deployment was the 'fire force' reaction operation. This was an operational assault or response composed of, usually, a first wave of 32 troopers carried to the scene by three helicopters and one DC-3 Dakota (called "Dak"), with a command/gun helicopter and a light attack-aircraft in support. The latter was a Cessna Skymaster, usually armed with two 30 mm rocket pods and two small napalm-bombs (made in Rhodesia and called 'Fran-tan'). The RLI became extremely adept at this type of military operation and the battalion killed or captured around 3000 of the enemy (the vast majority being Zimbabwe African National Liberation Army) in the last three years of the war, whilst losing less than three hundred killed and wounded (not counting those casualties incurred in patrolling or external ops).

In addition to the fire force, the four Commandos were often used in patrolling actions, mostly inside Rhodesia but sometimes in Zambia and Mozambique. In these operations troopies were required to carry well over 100 lbs of equipment for five to tens days for one patrol and come back and repeat, for weeks, sometimes months. Also, they participated in many attacks on enemy camps in above countries. In a few of these attacks most or all of the battalion was involved.

The First Battalion Rhodesian Light Infantry was originally formed within the army of the Federation of Rhodesia and Nyasaland in 1961 in Bulawayo. The battalion's nucleus came from the short-lived Number One Training Unit, which had been raised to provide personnel for a white infantry battalion as well as for C Squadron 22 (Rhodesian) SAS and the Rhodesian Armoured Car Regiment Selous Scouts (not the Selous Scout special forces regiment of the same name).

=== Selous Scouts ===
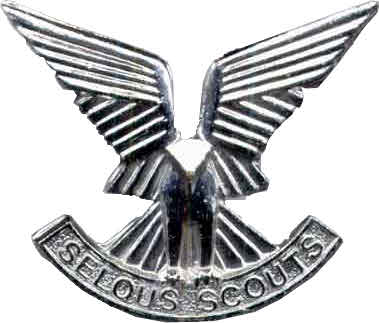
Cap badge of the Selous Scouts

During this time period the Selous Scouts, operated as special forces regiment of the Rhodesian Army. They were named after British explorer Frederick Courteney Selous (1851–1917), and their motto was pamwe chete, which translated from Shona means "all together", "together only" or "forward together". The charter of the Selous Scouts directed "the clandestine elimination of terrorists/terrorism both within and without the country."

The Selous Scouts were racial-integrated unit (approx. 70% black soldiers) which conducted a highly successful clandestine war against the guerrillas by posing as guerrillas themselves. Their unrivalled tracking abilities, survival and COIN skills made them one of the most feared of the army units by enemy. The unit was responsible for 68% of all enemy casualties within the borders of Rhodesia.

=== British South Africa Police ===
The BSAP, a unit in existence since the 1890s, formed an important part of the white minority government's fight against black nationalist guerrillas. The force formed a riot unit; a tracker combat team (later renamed the Police Anti-Terrorist Unit or PATU); an Urban Emergency Unit and a Marine Division, and from 1973 offered places to white conscripts as part of Rhodesia's national service scheme. Until the late 1970s, black Rhodesians were prevented from holding ranks higher than Sub-Inspector in the BSAP, and only white Rhodesians could gain commissioned rank.

=== Patriotic Front ===
The Patriotic Front (PF) was originally formed in 1976 as a political and military alliance between ZAPU and ZANU during the war against white minority rule. Both movements contributed their respective military forces: ZAPU's military wing was known as Zimbabwe People's Revolutionary Army (ZIPRA) which operated mainly from Zambia and somewhat in Angola, and ZANU's guerrillas were known as Zimbabwe National African Liberation Army (ZANLA) which formed in 1965 in Tanzania, but operated mainly from camps around Lusaka, Zambia and later from Mozambique. Objective of the Patriotic Front was to overthrow the white minority regime by means of political pressure and military force.

=== End of the war ===
In 1979 another airliner was shot down and the Rhodesians launched more raids on guerrilla bases, successfully avoiding air-defence systems and the Soviet MiG-17s based in Mozambique. A raid was made by the SAS and the Selous Scouts on the ZIPRA HQ in Lusaka, where they narrowly missed being able to kill the ZIPRA leader, Nkomo. The Rhodesian people tired of increasing war and political isolation, so the war ended when the white-ruled government of Rhodesia handed power over to British at the 1979 Lancaster House Constitutional Conference, at the behest of both South Africa (its major backer) and the US, multi-ethnic elections were subsequently held in early 1980. Britain recognised this new government and the newly, internationally recognised, independent country was renamed as Zimbabwe. A nucleus of former RLI personnel remained to train and form the First Zimbabwe Commando Battalion of the Zimbabwe National Army, however, the RLI regiment itself was disbanded in 1980. The Selous Scouts were also disbanded in 1980, but many of its soldiers travelled south to join the Apartheid South African Defence Force, where they joined 5 Reconnaissance Commando. The BSAP, which at the time of Mugabe's victory consisted of approximately 11,000 regulars (about 60% black) and almost 35,000 reservists, of whom the overwhelming majority were white, was renamed the Zimbabwe Republic Police and followed an official policy of "Africanisation", in which senior white officers were retired and their positions filled by black officers.

== Zimbabwean Genocide ==
Following majority rule elections, the rivalry that had been fermenting between ZAPU and ZANU erupted, with guerrilla activity starting again in the Matabeleland provinces (south-western Zimbabwe). Armed resistance in Matabeleland was met with bloody government repression. At least 20,000 Matabele died in the ensuing near-genocidal massacres, perpetrated by an elite, communist-trained brigade, known in Zimbabwe as the Gukurahundi. A peace accord was negotiated and on 30 December 1987 Mugabe became head of state after changing the constitution to usher in his vision of a presidential regime. On 19 December 1989 ZAPU merged with ZANU under the name ZANU-Patriotic Front (ZANU-PF).

ZANU Flag

The present era in Zimbabwe is called the Gukurahundi , by the ruling ZANU-PF. The Mugabe administration claims that colonial social and economic structures remained largely intact in the years after the end of Rhodesian rule, with a small minority of white farmers owning the vast majority of the country's arable land (many partys within Zimbabwe question the extent and validity of these assertions, considering twenty years of ZANU-PF rule, the "Willing Buyer-Willing Seller" policy paid for by Britain and the diminished size of Zimbabwe's white population). By 2000 ZANU militants proclaimed violent struggle for land reform the "Third Chimurenga". The beginning of the "Third Chimurenga" is often attributed to the need to distract Zimbabwean electorate from the poorly conceived war in the Democratic Republic of the Congo and deepening economic problems blamed on graft and ineptitude in the ruling party.

The opposition briefly used the term to describe Zimbabwe's current struggles aimed at removing the ZANU government, resolving the Land Question, the establishment of democracy, rebuilding the rule of law and good governance, as well as the eradication of corruption in Government. The term is no longer in vogue amongst Zimbabwe's urban population and lacks the gravitas it once had so was dropped from the opposition's lexicon.

=== Modern Zimbabwe ===
In 1999, the Government of Zimbabwe sent a sizeable military force into the Democratic Republic of Congo to support the government of President Laurent Kabila during the Second Congo War. Those forces were largely withdrawn in 2002.
