= Economic history of Zimbabwe =

Zimbabwe's GDP annual percentage growth rate from 1961 to 2010.

The economic history of Zimbabwe began with the transition to majority rule in 1980 and Britain's ceremonial granting of independence. The new government under Prime Minister Robert Mugabe promoted socialism, partially relying on international aid. The new regime inherited one of the most structurally developed economies and effective state systems in Africa. In 2000, the government imposed a land reform program to seize white-owned farms which caused the economy to shrink along with mismanagement, corruption and political instability.

== Pre-colonial rule ==
The economic activities of Bantu states in the region largely reflected the resources of the area and the economic traditions of the inhabitants. For example, the economic power of the Rozwi Empire was based on cattle wealth and farming, with significant gold mining. They established trade with Arab traders, in which materials such as gold, copper, slaves, and ivory were exchanged for luxury goods.

== Under company, British and minority rule ==
White immigration to the Company realm was initially modest, but intensified during the 1900s and early 1910s, particularly south of the Zambezi. The economic slump in the Cape following the Second Boer War motivated many white South Africans to move to Southern Rhodesia, and from about 1907 the company's land settlement programme encouraged more immigrants to stay for good. The Southern Rhodesian mining and farming industries advanced considerably during this period; Southern Rhodesia's annual gold output grew in worth from £610,389 in 1901 to £2,526,007 in 1908. The territory first balanced revenue and expenditure in 1912.

Economically, Southern Rhodesia developed an economy that was narrowly based on production of a few primary products, notably, chrome and tobacco. It was therefore vulnerable to the economic cycle. The deep recession of the 1930s gave way to a post-war boom. This boom prompted the immigration of about 200,000 whites between 1945 and 1970, taking the white population up to 307,000. A large number of these immigrants were of British working-class origin, with others coming from the Belgian Congo, Kenya, Tanzania, and later Angola and Mozambique. They established a relatively balanced economy, transforming what was once a primary producer dependent on backwoods farming into an industrial giant which spawned a strong manufacturing sector, iron and steel industries, and modern mining ventures. These economic successes owed little to foreign aid.

The economy of the state of Rhodesia sustained international sanctions for a decade following the declaration of its independence, a resistance which waned as more southern African states declared independence and majority rule as well as the destruction of the Rhodesian Bush War.

== 1980s ==
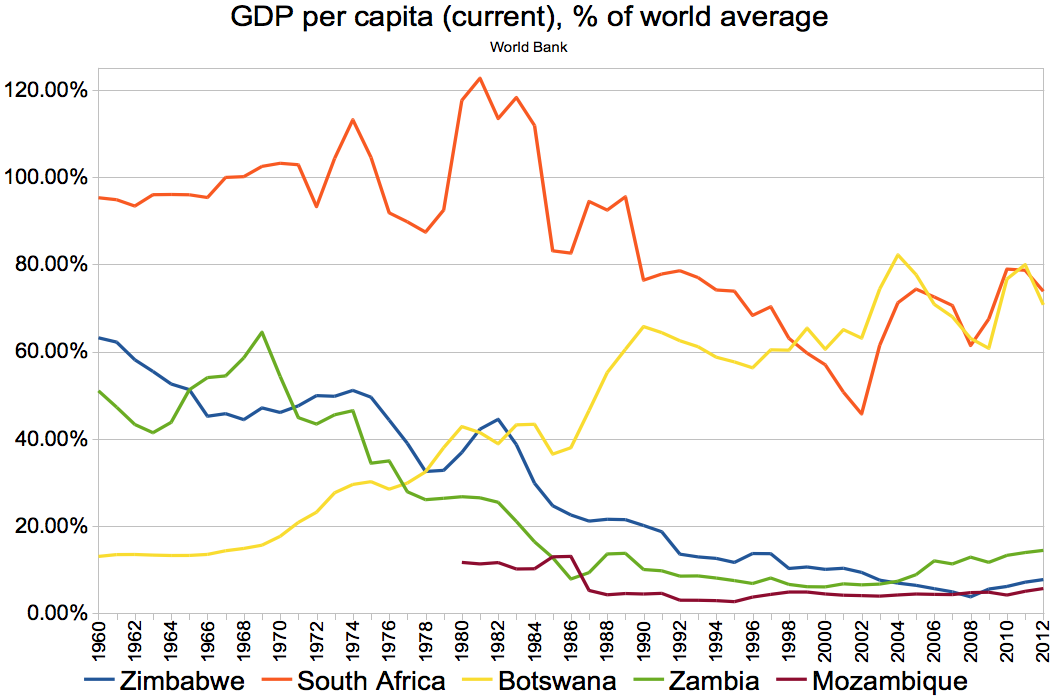
GDP per capita (current), compared to neighbouring countries (world average = 100)

Initially the government followed a corporatist model with government management of the economy.

The government propagated a whole range of new economic policies, introducing a minimum wage and virtually eliminating the right to fire workers. Total spending on education nearly tripled (from Z$227.6 million to Z$628.0 million), as did government spending on healthcare (from Z$66.4 million to Z$188.6 million), between 1979 and 1990. Expenditure on public-sector employment rose by 60%, and on the civil service by 12% per annum over the course of the 1980s. Central government expenditure tripled and increased its share from 32.5 percent of GDP in 1979 to 44.6% in 1989. Interest rates were artificially capped.

The consequences during this time were rather mixed. Economic inequality within the population decreased and provision of education and healthcare became more widespread. During the 1980s GDP per capita increased by 11.5%. During the same time period the US had a 38% increase in GDP per capita. Thus the relative poverty of the country rose in relation to the United States during this period. There was an exodus of white Zimbabweans, skilled workers during this period.

There were several reasons for middling to low performance of the economy. Protection sustained existing high cost companies, but discouraged exports by raising the costs of inputs to exporters, leading to a critical shortage of the foreign exchange needed to acquire imported technology. Foreign companies were not allowed to remit dividends, and new foreign investment was actively discouraged. The need to get permission and licenses for new investment and the dismissal of individual workers imposed heavy time and transaction costs. Repressed interest rates discouraged saving and the state's high propensity to borrow reduced the supply of capital to all but favoured borrowers, and also stoked inflation. The regime did not encourage, and even suppressed, the development of independent new African businesses because of the threat they were thought to offer to ZANU's political monopoly.

Public spending skyrocketed, particularly in the areas of civil service employment, spending on social services, drought relief, and subsidies for government owned companies. This in turn generated a chronic budget deficit, a high tax regime, and a rapid increase in public debt – all of which created a drag on the economy. Private investment was crowded out by shortages of credit stemming from the fiscal deficit, high taxes and the shortages of foreign exchange. The overall effects of these constraints favoured existing capital-intensive producers, biasing the economy against areas labour-intensive activities. Compounding the problem, all companies were effectively discouraged from employing new workers because of controls over wages and employment.

This had two politically significant consequences. First, it suppressed the emergence of a genuinely entrepreneurial African business class and reduced the political support of those that did make their way despite these problems. Second, it turned unemployment into a major threat to the legitimacy of the regime, especially in urban areas. In real terms, wages declined over the decade.

== 1990s ==
By the end of the 1980s there was increasing agreement amongst government elites that new economic policies needed to be implemented for the long-term survival of the regime. The new policy regime designed by the government and its advisers set out to encourage job-creating growth by transferring control over prices from the state to the market, improving access to foreign exchange, reducing administrative controls over investment and employment decisions, and by reducing the fiscal deficit. It had wide local support and was introduced before economic problems had gone out of control. A 40 percent devaluation of the Zimbabwean dollar was allowed to occur and price and wage controls were removed.

The austerity plan in Zimbabwe was followed by economic problems of increased severity. Growth, employment, wages, and social service spending contracted sharply, inflation was not reduced, the deficit remained well above target, and many industrial firms, notably in textiles and footwear, closed in response to increased competition and high real interest rates. The incidence of poverty in the country increased during this time. On the positive side, capital formation and the percentage of exports in GDP increased and urban–rural inequality fell.

The new policies were undermined by extremely unfavorable conditions. Drought reduced agricultural output, exports, public revenue, and demand for local manufacturing. Growth during three drought-affected years (1992, 1993, and 1995) averaged 2.6 percent; during three good years (1991, 1994, and 1996) it was 6.5 percent. The new ANC regime in South Africa cancelled its trade agreement with Zimbabwe at this time and subjected its exports to punitive tariffs, just as Zimbabwe reduced its own, contributing significantly to deindustrialisation.

The government's failure to bring the fiscal deficit under control undermined the effectiveness of those elements in the program that were followed through. This led to growth in public borrowing, sharp increases in interest rates, and upward pressure on the exchange rate just as local firms were exposed to intensified foreign competition. Many firms failed, many others were forced to restructure, and new investment was discouraged in both the formal and increasingly important informal sector. The limited cuts that were made concentrated on the social services and led to serious reductions in the quality of health and education.

The government's austerity plan coupled with a relatively weak and highly protected economy came far too quickly. Uncompetitive industries were eliminated and overmanning was reduced, but in such a sudden and disruptive manner as to cause economic chaos. Similar problems occurred in certain Eastern European countries after the collapse of Communism. The government's management of its transition to capitalism was much better. The public reaction to the disaster only further undermined the economy perpetuating a vicious cycle. By the mid-1990s, there were signs of improvement. However, the patience of both the government and the people was exhausted, and a new direction was taken.

In 1998 Mugabe's intervention in the civil war in the Democratic Republic of the Congo (Kinshasa)—purportedly to protect his personal investments—resulted in suspension of international economic aid for Zimbabwe. This suspension of aid and the millions of dollars spent to intervene in the war further weakened Zimbabwe's already troubled economy.

In part through its control of the media, the huge parastatal sector of the economy, and the security forces, the government managed to keep organised political opposition to a minimum through most of the 1990s.

== Indigenization debate ==
By 1990 there were increasing demands for greater native African participation in ownership of the economy on the basis of continuing racial inequalities in the post-colonial economy. For example, by 1991, 50% of the population received less than 15% of total annual incomes and about 15% of total consumption, while the richest three percent of the population received 30% of total incomes and were responsible for 30% of total consumption. The government-controlled economy of the 1980s tried to redistribute wealth to the black majority while emphasising racial harmony. With the increasing economic problems at the end of the 1990s and the reforms of the 1990s, new complaints were heard about the unequal racial distribution of wealth. For the ruling party, there was also a political imperative as the emergence in the late 1980s of opposition parties such as the Zimbabwe Unity Movement and the Forum Party had demonstrated the potential for political opposition from disconcerted sections of the African middle class. This emphasis on redistribution of wealth from whites to blacks was a policy that the government began to directly pursue in the mid-1990s.

== 2000–present ==
Zimbabwe's economy has shrunk since 2000, in an atmosphere of political turmoil, capital flight, corruption and mismanagement. Inflation has spiralled out of control (peaking at 500 billion % in 2009) and the underpinnings of the economy in agriculture and industry have been dissipated. Due to the state of the formal economy, many Zimbabweans have begun working in the informal economy. Because of this, it is estimated that by 2009 unemployment was nearer 10% than the official 90%.

== See also ==
- Economy of Africa
- Economy of Zimbabwe
- History of Zimbabwe
- Zimbabwean dollar
