= List of World Heritage Sites in Zimbabwe =

Location of World Heritage Sites in Zimbabwe. Green dots represent natural sites, red dots indicate cultural sites

The United Nations Educational, Scientific and Cultural Organization (UNESCO) World Heritage Sites are places of importance to cultural or natural heritage as described in the UNESCO World Heritage Convention, established in 1972. Cultural heritage consists of monuments (such as architectural works, monumental sculptures, or inscriptions), groups of buildings, and sites (including archaeological sites). Natural features (consisting of physical and biological formations), geological and physiographical formations (including habitats of threatened species of animals and plants), and natural sites which are important from the point of view of science, conservation, or natural beauty, are defined as natural heritage. Zimbabwe accepted the convention on 16 August 1982. There are five World Heritage Sites in Zimbabwe, with a further five on the tentative list.

The first site in Zimbabwe to be inscribed to the list was the Mana Pools National Park, Sapi and Chewore Safari Areas, in 1984. The most recent site listed was the Matobo Hills, in 2003. Three sites in Zimbabwe are listed for their cultural and two for their natural properties. Mosi-oa-Tunya / Victoria Falls is a transnational site, being shared with Zambia. Zimbabwe has served on the World Heritage Committee twice.

== World Heritage Sites ==
UNESCO lists sites under ten criteria; each entry must meet at least one of the criteria. Criteria i through vi are cultural, and vii through x are natural.

* Transnational site

World Heritage Sites
Site	Image	Location (province)	Year listed	UNESCO data	Description
Mana Pools National Park, Sapi and Chewore Safari Areas	Trees growing on a river island	Mashonaland West	1984	302; vii, ix, x (natural)	This site comprises three contiguous protected areas along the Zambezi river. The Mana Pools are former river channels, created by alluvial deposits. In the dry season, the floodplains are an important refuge for large mammal communities, including the African elephant, hippopotamus, African buffalo, waterbuck, zebra, together with predators such as the lion, leopard, cheetah, as well as the Nile crocodile. Eastern black rhinoceroses used to live here at the time of inscription but the remaining animals have since been moved for safekeeping elsewhere.
Great Zimbabwe National Monument	Ruins in stone, a wall and a tower	Masvingo	1986	364; i, iii, vi (cultural)	Great Zimbabwe was founded by the Bantu Shona people in the 11th century. At its peak in the 14th century, the city had 10,000 inhabitants and was a major regional centre with trade links to China, Persia, and Kilwa Sultanate, on the east coast of Africa. It was abandoned c. 1450 because of overpopulation and deforestation, with power shifting to Khami. The archaeological complex comprises the Great Enclosure, Hill Ruins, and Valley Ruins. Six columns with Zimbabwe Birds were found in the ruins.
Khami Ruins National Monument	Ruins of a settlement in dry stone	Matabeleland North	1986	365; iii, iv (cultural)	Khami was the capital of the Torwa dynasty between c. 1450 – c. 1650, after Great Zimbabwe had been abandoned. Like the latter, it was built using the dry stone technique and in a similar architectural style. It was an important regional centre of trade, with porcelain from China and Spain found among archaeological remains. It was abandoned in the 19th century. Because the site was not destroyed by treasure hunters, it provides an important insight into the history of the region.
Mosi-oa-Tunya / Victoria Falls*	Massive waterfall, photo from above	Matabeleland North	1989	509; vii, viii (natural)	Along the border between Zimbabwe and Zambia, the Zambezi river creates a massive waterfall, with a width of 1,708 m (5,604 ft) and a maximum height of 108 m (354 ft). The river then continues through a series of narrow gorges, cut into basalt rock. The falling water creates mists that can be seen from tens of kilometres away. The gorges and the river islands serve as breeding grounds for the endangered Taita falcon and Verreaux's eagle.
Matobo Hills	Rock formation with several balancing stones	Matabeleland South	2003	306rev; iii, v, vi (cultural)	The Matobo Hills feature numerous granite landforms, created over millions of years of erosion (Mother and Child Kopje pictured). People have inhabited the area for at least 500,000 years and interacted with the landforms in different ways. There are rock paintings dating at least 13,000 years back, representing one of the densest concentrations of rock art in southern Africa. Archaeological remains and rock art illustrate the life of the foraging people and the transition to agricultural societies. The area is still a centre of the Mwari religion.

== Tentative list ==
In addition to sites inscribed on the World Heritage List, member states can maintain a list of tentative sites that they may consider for nomination. Nominations for the World Heritage List are only accepted if the site was previously listed on the tentative list. Zimbabwe maintains five properties on its tentative list.

Tentative sites
Site	Image	Location (province)	Year listed	UNESCO criteria	Description
Naletale Cluster of Dzimbabwes	Remains of a wall in dry stone	Matabeleland North	2018	ii, iii, iv (cultural)	This nomination comprises several clusters of settlements with dry stone walls. They date from the 16th to the 18th century. While not as monumental as the buildings in Great Zimbabwe or Khami, the walls in Naletale are renowned for their architectural finesse with fine ornamentation. The people of Naletale traded with the Portuguese, exchanging gold for items such as Chinese porcelain.
Gonarezhou National Park	A pool surrounded by rocky and sandy terrain with some trees	Masvingo	2025	vii, viii, x (natural)	This national park has a hot, semi-arid climate, and encompasses woodland savanna, scrubland, and savanna grassland. The variety of minerals present in its cliffs reflects various stages of Earth's geological history. This area also supports a highly diverse vertebrate fauna, including many threatened species.
Ziwa National Monument	Stone ruins under trees	Manicaland	2025	iii, iv, v (cultural)	Ziwa is an archaeological site with finds that span from the Stone Age to historical times. There are remains from hunter-gatherer societies, rock art sites, remains of settlements of agricultural societies, hill forts, enclosures, and remains of iron smelters.
Mavhuradonha Wilderness		Mashonaland Central	2025	iii, v, vi (cultural)	Mavhuradonha encompasses numerous Mutapa Empire sites, including those associated with the legendary ruler Nyatsimba Mutota. These sites are of high spiritual importance to the local population. In addition, it covers some of the earliest rock art and palm-print sites in Southern Africa.
Chimanimani National Park, Eland sanctuary, Rusitu and Haroni botanical reserves	Mountains	Manicaland	2025	ix, x (natural)	This site covers montane grassland and forest areas of eastern Zimbabwe. It features diverse flora, including many endemic species, and its landscape is considered to be of great aesthetic value.
