= Herbert Stephen Henderson =

Recipient of the Victoria Cross

Herbert Stephen Henderson VC
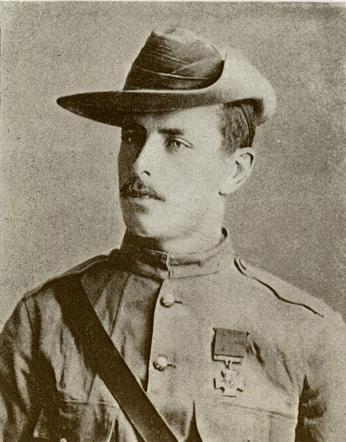
- Born: 30 March 1870; Glasgow, Scotland
- Died: 10 August 1942 (aged 72); Bulawayo, Southern Rhodesia
- Burial place: Bulawayo Town Cemetery
- Military career
- Allegiance: Rhodesia
- Branch: South African Forces
- Service years: 1896–1897
- Rank: Trooper
- Units: Rhodesia Horse
- Conflicts: Matabeleland Rebellion
- Awards: Victoria Cross

Herbert Stephen Henderson VC (30 March 1870 – 10 August 1942) was a Scottish-born Rhodesian recipient of the Victoria Cross, the highest British and Commonwealth award. Henderson was born in Glasgow and educated at Kelvinside Academy in Glasgow.

== Details ==
Henderson was 26 years old, and a trooper in the Rhodesia Horse, Bulawayo Field Force during the Matabeleland Rebellion, when the following deed took place for which he was awarded the VC.

On 30 March 1896 at Campbell's Store, near Bulawayo, Rhodesia (now Zimbabwe), a patrol which had been sent to the rescue of another beleaguered patrol, was surprised by rebels and Trooper Henderson and another trooper were cut off from the main party. The second trooper was shot through the knee and his horse killed, so Trooper Henderson put the wounded man on his own horse, and, walking beside it, made his way to Bulawayo, 35 miles away. They had to move principally by night, as the country was full of marauding rebels and they had no food for two days and one night.

He was involved in the mining industry. He was prevented from serving in World War I as he was working in a reserved occupation.

== Medal ==
His VC is on display at the National Army Museum in Chelsea, London.
