= International rankings of Zimbabwe =

These are the international rankings of Zimbabwe:

== Economy ==
- World Economic Forum Global Competitiveness Report 2014–2015 ranked 124 out of 144
- United Nations Development Programme 2014 Human Development Index ranked 156 out of 187
- International Monetary Fund 2014 GDP (nominal) per capita ranked 160 out of 186 countries

== Military ==
- Institute for Economics and Peace 2010 Global Peace Index 124 out of 144

== Politics ==
- Transparency International: Corruption Perceptions Index 2014, ranked 156 out of 175 countries
- Reporters Without Borders 2015 Press Freedom Index, ranked 131 out of 180 countries
- Economist Intelligence Unit 2014 Democracy Index ranked 150 out of 167 countries

== Technology ==
- World Intellectual Property Organization: Global Innovation Index 2026, ranked 132 out of 139 countries
