= White settlement in Zimbabwe before 1923 =

Europeans first came to the region in southern Africa today called Zimbabwe in the sixteenth century, when Portuguese colonials ventured inland from Mozambique and attacked the Kingdom of Mutapa, which then controlled an area roughly equivalent to eastern Zimbabwe and western Mozambique. Portuguese influence over Mutapa endured for about two centuries before fading away during the 1690s and early-1700s (decade). During the year of 1685, French Huguenots emigrated to present-day South Africa and whilst some settled there, others moved further north into the continent. Those who did, settled within modern-day Zimbabwe, Mozambique and Botswana, and co-existed with the indigenous people; most of whom, in Zimbabwe, were the Naletale people.

During the 1880s and 1890s, the British South Africa Company initiated colonisation by Europeans, backed by a royal charter from Queen Victoria: company rule over the country began in 1890, when the Pioneer Column marched to Mashonaland, founded Fort Salisbury and settled in the area.

The company domain was named "Rhodesia" after its founder, Cecil Rhodes, in 1895; the portion south of the Zambezi became officially called Southern Rhodesia in 1898. Concurrently with the expiry of the company's charter in 1923, Southern Rhodesia was granted responsible government by the UK, and became a self-governing colony.

== Portuguese and the Rozvi Empire ==
In the early 16th century, the Portuguese arrived, destroyed Mutapa's trade with Swahili merchants and began a series of wars which left the empire so weakened that it was near collapse in the early 17th century. Several Kalanga communities came together to form the Rozwi Empire, which covered more than half of present-day Zimbabwe. By 1690 they forced the Portuguese off the plateau and the Rozvi controlled much of the land formerly under Mwene Mutapa.

With relative peace and prosperity for the next two centuries, the centres of Dlo-Dlo, Khami reached their peaks. As a result of the mid-19th century turmoil in Transvaal and Natal, the Rozvi Empire came to an end. Ndebele peoples migrating from the Mfecane came to the Rozvi Empire and made war with it. They conquered it and assimilated the inhabitants.

== British settlement ==
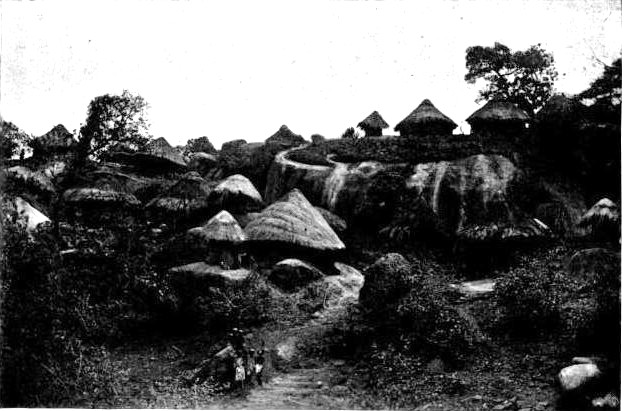
Traditional African Huts, 1884

The British entered Matabeleland in the 1880s, under the leadership of Cecil Rhodes, who extracted mining rights from King Lobengula of the Ndebele. He sent John Moffat, son of the missionary Robert Moffat, who was trusted by Lobengula, to persuade the latter to sign a treaty of friendship with Britain. Moffat persuaded Lobengula to look favourably on Rhodes' proposals carried by his agent Charles Rudd. Rudd assured Lobengula that no more than ten European men would mine in Matabeleland, but left this stipulation out of the document which Lobengula signed, the Rudd Concession. It stated that the mining companies could do anything necessary to their operations. When Lobengula discovered later what the concession really declared, he tried to renounce it, but the British Government ignored him.

Rhodes used the concession to persuade the British government to grant a royal charter to his British South Africa Company (BSAC) over Matabeleland and its subject states, such as Mashonaland. Through such concessions and treaties, many of which were similarly deceitful, he promoted the colonization of the region's land, labor, and precious metal and mineral resources. In 1895 the BSAC adopted the name 'Rhodesia' for Zambesia and in 1898 'Southern Rhodesia' was officially adopted for the part south of the Zambezi River, which later became Zimbabwe.

The Rudd Concession was a first step towards occupation of good land, but Lobengula's Ndebele were too strong for a direct invasion. Rhodes planned to surround Matebeleland with British-controlled lands, as British Bechuanaland was already established in the west. To the east was Mashonaland, and as the Shona were at the time subjects of Lobengula, they were covered by the Rudd Concession.

In 1890 Rhodes used this fact to justify sending the Pioneer Column of European settlers, protected by well-armed British South Africa Police (BSAP), the BSAC's own paramilitary force. Rhodes said they hoped to start a "new Rand" from the ancient gold mines of Mashonaland. The gold had been largely depleted, and the settlers became farmers. Rhodes declared that Lobengula had never really conquered the Shona, so he proclaimed Mashonaland as independent of Matabeland, exploiting tribal rivalries to cement the British settlers' occupation.

Rhodes provoked the neighbouring Ndebele into war, and the BSAP defeated them in the First Matabele War (1893–94). Lobengula won the battle of the Shangani Patrol but he died while fleeing north; with the Ndebele defeat, immigration of more Europeans increased greatly. John Moffat belatedly realised that he had been used by Rhodes and opposed the war. The British government suspected that Rhodes knew that the gold was depleted and that Rhodes' primary aim was to settle Mashonaland and Matabeleland all along. After that and the Jameson Raid on the Transvaal, they did not trust him to the same extent.

Soon after the Jameson Raid, the Ndebele and Shona rose up in rebellion against the encroachment on their native lands by European settlers, a struggle known in Zimbabwe as the First Chimurenga. Europeans called it the Second Matabele War (1896–97). The BSAP defeated them again. The American scout Frederick Russell Burnham killed Mlimo, the Ndebele leader of the rebellion. Soon after Rhodes entered unarmed into the Ndebele stronghold in Matobo Hills and persuaded the impi to lay down their arms, effectively ending the Second Matabele War. The Ndebele and Shona became subject to the Rhodes administration, which led to the land distribution favouring Europeans and displacing Shona, Ndebele and other Black African people. Land holdings in Zimbabwe continue to be a controversial issue.

== Rule by the British South Africa Company and Legislative Council ==
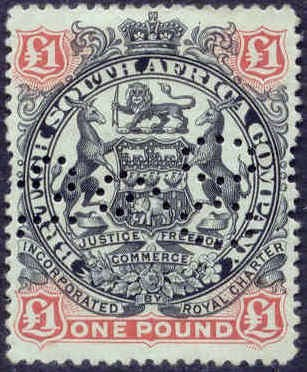
British South Africa Company Stamp, 1897

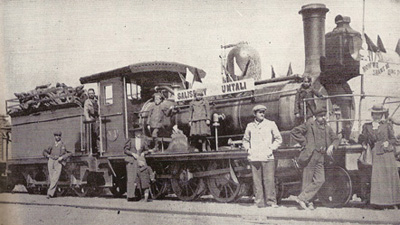
Opening of the railroad to Umtali in 1899

From 1894 the colony's executive branch was run by the BSAC's administrator. The Southern Rhodesia Order in Council created a quasi-legislature called the Southern Rhodesia Legislative Council. Elections were held in 1899, 1902, 1905, 1908, 1911, 1914 and 1920.

There was a gradual de facto transition from complete rule by the British South Africa Company to self-government by the European settlers. By 1903 the Southern Rhodesia Legislative Council consisted of seven officials of the British South Africa Company and seven elected settlers. In 1907 and later the settlers had the majority of the seats. By the outbreak of the First World War, settlers had formed the Campaign for Responsible Government (later the Responsible Government Association) under Charles Coghlan, who became Rhodesia's first Prime Minister.

In 1918, the BSAC cut back on expenditure and public services such as the mail system, which worsened its popularity among settlers. Agitation continued to grow for self-rule independent of any private corporation. The Legislative Council election of 1920 resulted in a majority who favoured immediate moves towards establishing 'Responsible Government' within the colony. Immediately after the election, the Legislative Council passed a resolution requesting the United Kingdom government to inaugurate responsible government. The UK established a Commission under Earl Buxton, a former Liberal minister. The Commission reported in 1921 that the Colony was ready for responsible government and that a referendum should be held to confirm it. On 27 October 1922 a referendum was held to determine whether the colony should join the Union of South Africa or establish self-government. The self-government camp won the referendum by a wide margin.
