= Ernest Montagu =

Rhodesian politician (1862–1952)

Sir Ernest William Sanders Montagu (1862 – 20 November 1952) was a Rhodesian civil servant and politician.

He was Secretary for Mines (later Secretary for Mines and Works) under the British South Africa Company. When Southern Rhodesia was given responsible government in 1923, Montagu retired on a pension and was knighted in the 1923 Birthday Honours. He continued to sit in the Legislative Assembly as an independent. In 1927, he became the head the Progressive Party, but lost his seat in the 1928 election in Gatooma.
