= Herbert Hayton Castens =

South African rugby union player and cricketer

H. H. Castens
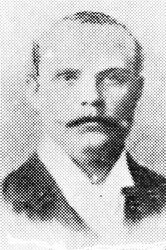
- Born: Herbert Hayton Castens; 23 November 1864 Pearston, Cape Colony
- Died: 18 October 1929 (aged 64) Fulham, London, England
- Height: 1.86 m (6 ft 1 in)
- Weight: 111 kg (17 st 7 lb)

Rugby union career
- Position: Forward
Amateur team(s)
Years	Team	Apps	(Points)
- Villagers RFC
International career
Years	Team	Apps	(Points)
1891	South Africa	1	(0)
Refereeing career
Years	Competition		Apps
1891	Test Matches		1
- Cricket career

Cricket information
- Role: Wicketkeeper-batsman

Domestic team information
- Years: Team
- 1890-91 to 1893-94: Western Province

Career statistics
Competition	First-class
Matches	4
Runs scored	250
Batting average	41.66
100s/50s	1/1
Top score	165
Catches/stumpings	4/2
- Source: Cricinfo, 11 November 2018

Herbert Hayton Castens (23 November 1864 – 18 October 1929) was a South African rugby union footballer and cricketer. He captained South Africa at both rugby and cricket, and played an important role in the development of rugby and cricket in South Africa, both on and off the field. He was usually known as H. H. Castens.

== Biography ==
=== Early life ===
Born in Pearston in the Cape Colony, Castens was educated at Rugby School in England, where the sport of rugby is thought to have been created. He played both cricket and rugby, and was an outstanding athlete during his youth. He studied law at Oxford University, where in 1887, he obtained a rugby Blue. He was elected President of Vincent's Club. While studying, Castens played rugby for Middlesex and the South of England. Upon completing his studies at Oxford, he returned to South Africa, where he practised law in Cape Town.

=== Rugby career ===
Castens joined the Villagers Rugby Football Club, the second oldest rugby club in South Africa, in the southern suburbs of Cape Town. In 1890-91 he also represented the Western Province cricket team at the fifth Champion Bat Tournament in Cape Town as an opening batsman and wicket-keeper. He scored 165 against Eastern Province, the highest score of the three-match tournament.

In 1891, the British Isles rugby team toured South Africa. Castens refereed the first tour match, which was a combined Cape Town rugby side against the British Isles. Two days later he was appointed manager of the Western Province rugby side.

On 30 July, he captained South Africa in their first rugby international, against the British Isles team, which was played at the Crusader's Ground in Port Elizabeth. The British side scored two tries and a conversion to win the contest four to nil. Castens played in the front row in his one and only test. He thus became the first (and likely only) man to ever referee and play in matches in the same rugby test series. He also refereed a number of other matches in the tour: Port Elizabeth Clubs, Cape Colony, and the third and final test at Newlands on September 5, and won four to nil by Britain. Managing Western Province, he also played for them in their match against the tourists. He also refereed the unofficial final match of the tour against Stellenbosch. Castens is thought to be one of South Africa's first active rugby coaches; he believed that rugby was somewhat of a science.

=== Test history ===
No.	Opponents	Results(SA 1st)	Position	Tries	Date	Venue
1.	(United Kingdom) British Isles	0–4	Forward (c)		30 Jul 1891	Crusaders Ground, Port Elizabeth

=== Cricket career ===
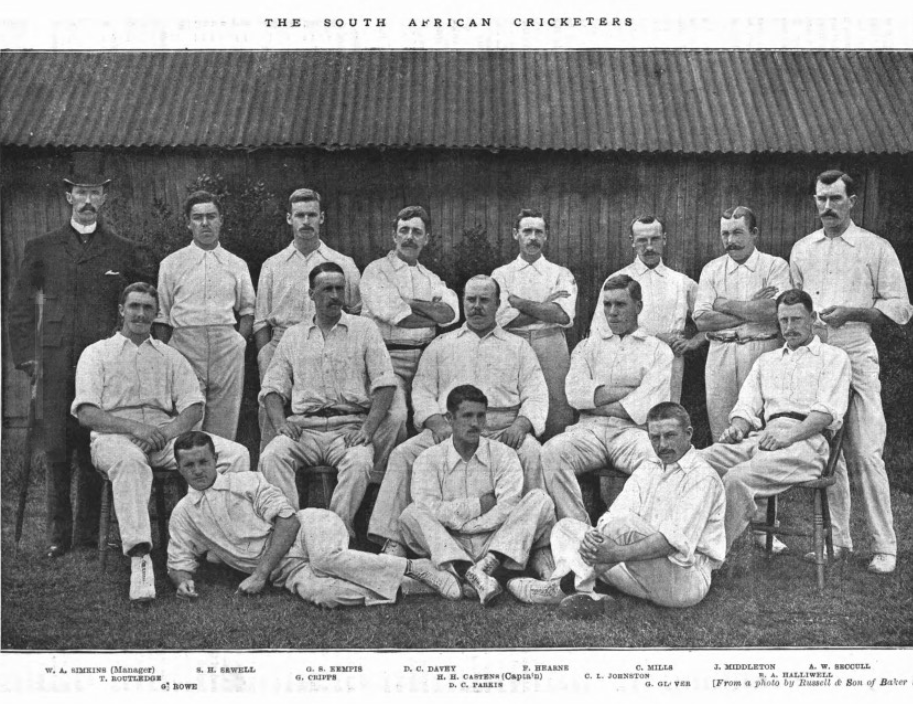
The South African team in 1894. Castens is seated in the centre.

Castens played cricket at Rugby, captaining the team at least once, and later played for Brasenose College, but he did not represent Oxford University. A wicket-keeper, he was also a hard-hitting batsman, who scored 165 in a first-class match for Western Province in the 1890–91 season.

In March 1894, the year that the South African Cricket Association was established, Castens captained Western Province to victory in the final of the Currie Cup tournament at Newlands in Cape Town, scoring 61 in an innings victory over Natal. Soon after, a South African cricket tour to England was organised, with Castens appointed as the captain. South Africa played matches against the first-class counties, but no Tests or first-class matches were played. 24 games were played on the tour, with 12 victories, five losses and seven draws. Opening the batting, Castens scored 58 against Surrey, the South Africans' top score in an innings defeat.

=== Later life ===
In 1897, Castens moved to Southern Rhodesia, where he worked as an advocate, and was later elected to the National Legislature. He served as chief secretary to the administrator from 1899 to 1908. Castens later returned to England, where he appears to have lived in obscurity until his death from chronic myocarditis on 18 October 1929 in Fulham, London, at the age of 64.

== See also ==
- List of South Africa national rugby union players – Springbok no. 9
- South African rugby union captains

Sporting positions
New title Team established	Springbok Captain; 1891	Succeeded by Bob Snedden
