= List of speakers of the National Assembly of Zimbabwe =

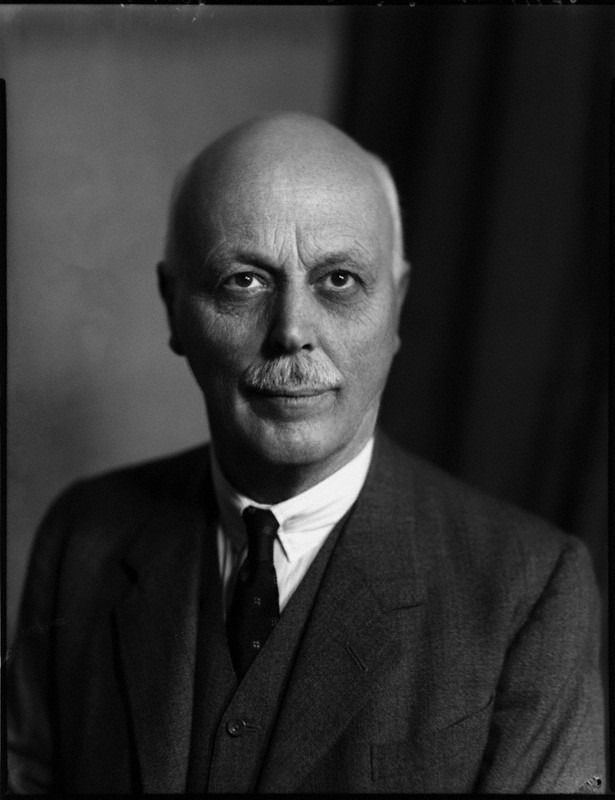
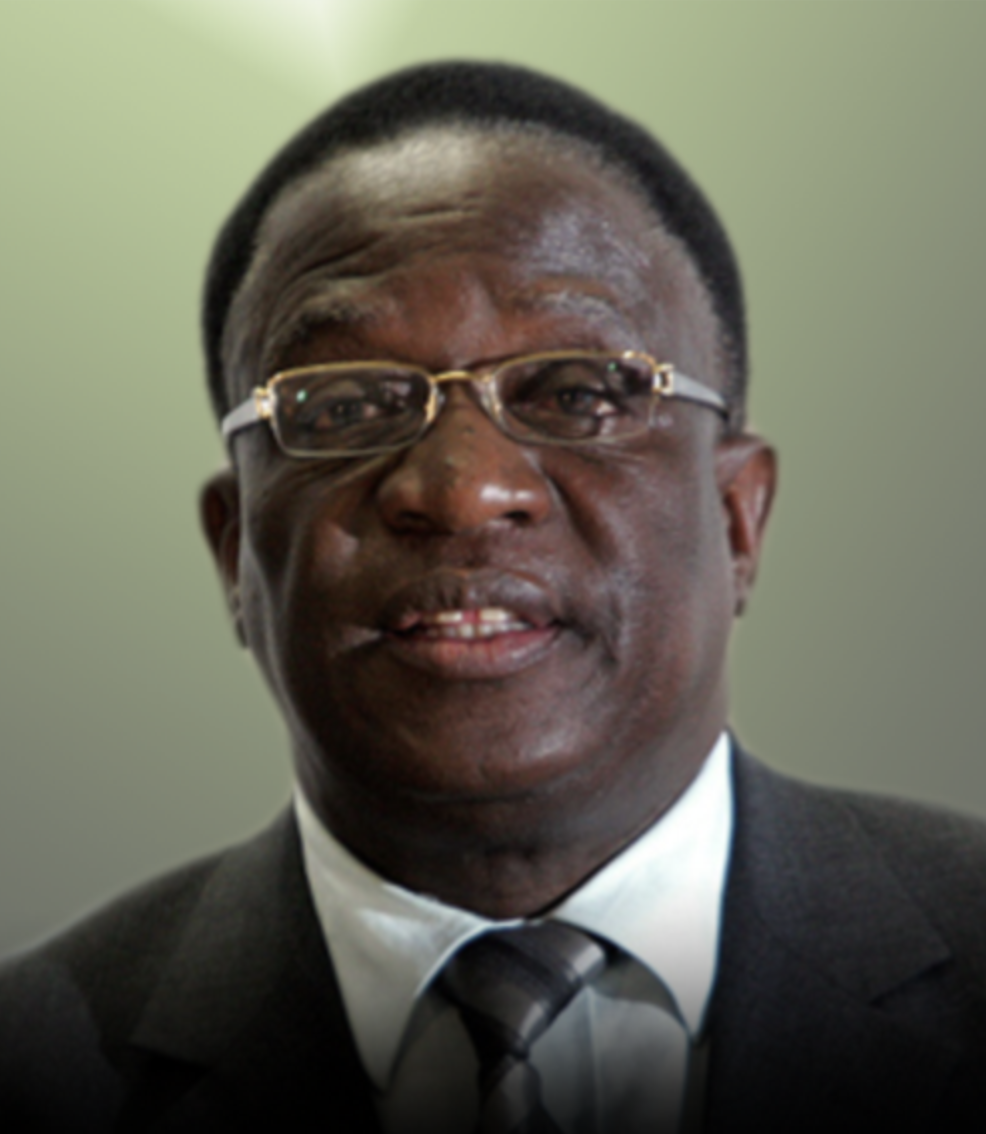
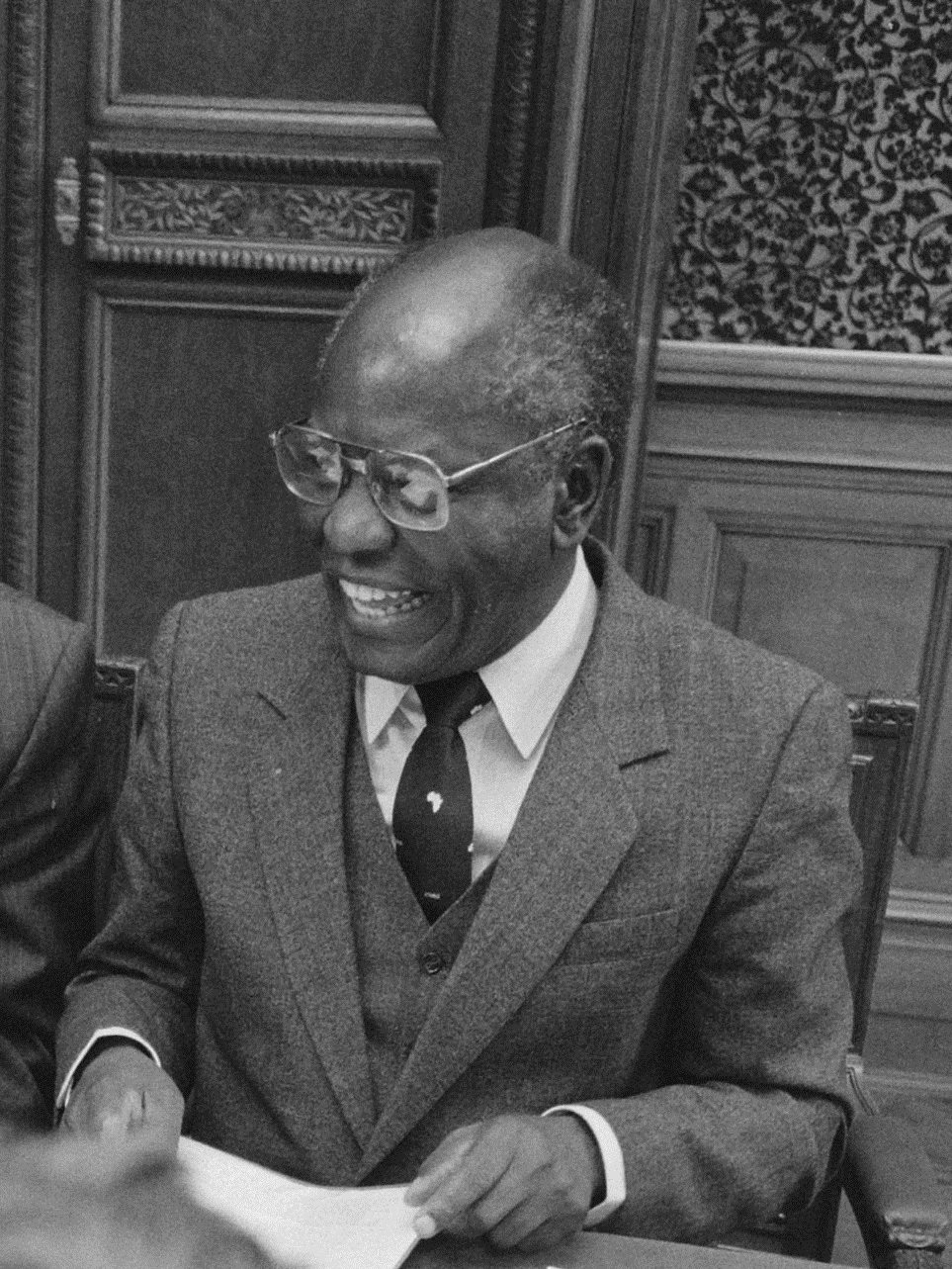
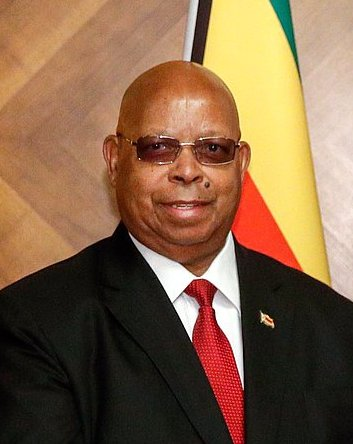
- Top left: Sir Allan Ross Welsh was the second speaker of the Rhodesian legislature.
- Top right: Emmerson Mnangagwa was speaker during land reform in the early 2000s.
- Bottom left: Didymus Mutasa was the first speaker of an independent Zimbabwe.
- Bottom right: Jacob Mudenda is the incumbent speaker.

The Speaker of the National Assembly is the presiding officer of the National Assembly, the lower house of the Parliament of Zimbabwe. The office has its roots in the colonial period, when the first Speaker of the Legislative Assembly of Southern Rhodesia was elected in 1924 following the grant of responsible government. The role continued through the Rhodesia and Zimbabwe-Rhodesia periods and was retained in the Parliament of Zimbabwe after independence in 1980.

A Speaker is elected by secret ballot at the first sitting of the National Assembly after a general election (and whenever a vacancy arises). The election is supervised by the Zimbabwe Electoral Commission in accordance with the Standing Orders. Although Speakers have generally been drawn from the majority party, the office is expected to be exercised with impartiality. Upon election, the Speaker is required to resign any party positions and to act independently when presiding. The Speaker remains a member of the National Assembly but ceases to represent a constituency and does not participate in debates except to exercise a casting vote in the event of a tie.

The incumbent Speaker is Jacob Mudenda, who was first elected on 22 August 2013 and has been re-elected in subsequent parliaments.

== List of speakers ==
=== Southern Rhodesia (1923–1964) and Rhodesia (1964–1965) ===
No.	Portrait	Speaker	Tenure	Term(s)	Party	Notes
1		Lionel Cripps	30 May 1924 – 11 March 1935	1st, 2nd, 3rd, 4th	Rhodesia Party (until 1934)	
1		Lionel Cripps	30 May 1924 – 11 March 1935	1st, 2nd, 3rd, 4th	United Party (after 1934)	
2		Allan Ross Welsh	11 March 1935 – 18 March 1952	4th, 5th, 6th, 7th	United Party	
3		Sir Tom Ian Findlay Wilson	18 March 1952 – 13 April 1954	7th, 8th	United Party	
4		William Addison	13 April 1954 – 30 June 1959	8th, 9th	United Party	
5		Walter Alexander	30 June 1959 – 28 July 1964	9th, 10th	?	
6		Albert Rubidge Washington Stumbles	28 July 1964 – 1965	10th, 11th	Rhodesian Front	

=== Federation of Rhodesia and Nyasaland (1953–1963) ===
No.	Portrait	Speaker	Tenure	Term(s)	Party	Notes
1		Sir Tom Ian Findlay Wilson	1953 – 1960	1st, 2nd	Federal Party; United Federal Party	
2			1960 – 1963	2nd, 3rd	United Federal Party	

=== Rhodesia (1965–1979) ===
House of Assembly was unicameral legislature from 1965 to 1970, and the lower house of the bicameral Parliament of Rhodesia from 1970 to 1979.

No.	Portrait	Speaker	Tenure	Party	Notes
1		Albert Rubidge Washington Stumbles	1965 – 31 December 1972	Rhodesian Front	
2		George Holland Hartley	27 March 1973 – 1979	Rhodesian Front	

=== Zimbabwe Rhodesia (1979) and Southern Rhodesia (1979–1980) ===
No.	Portrait	Speaker	Tenure	Party	Notes
1		John Moses Chirimbani	8–25 May 1979	United African National Council	
2		John Zwenhamo Ruredzo	25 May 1979 – 1979	United African National Council	

=== Zimbabwe (1980–present) ===
No.	Portrait	Speaker	Tenure	Parliament(s)	Party
1		Didymus Mutasa	14 May 1980 – 1990	1st, 2nd	ZANU (until 1987)
1		Didymus Mutasa	14 May 1980 – 1990	1st, 2nd	ZANU–PF (after 1987)
2		Nolan Makombe	2 May 1990 – 1995	3rd	ZANU–PF
3		Cyril Ndebele	14 April 1995 – 2000	4th	ZANU–PF
4		Emmerson Mnangagwa	1 July 2000 – 2005	5th	ZANU–PF
5		John Nkomo	1 April 2005 – 5 March 2008	6th	ZANU–PF
6		Lovemore Moyo	25 August 2008 – 28 June 2013	7th	MDC–T
7		Jacob Mudenda	3 September 2013 – Incumbent	8th, 9th, 10th	ZANU–PF

== Deputy Speakers ==
No.	Portrait	Deputy Speaker	Tenure	Parliament(s)	Party
1		Tsitsi Gezi	2018 – Incumbent	9th, 10th	ZANU–PF

== See also ==
- Southern Rhodesian Legislative Assembly
- National Assembly of Zimbabwe
