= Jacob Mudenda =

Zimbabwean politician

The Honourable Jacob Mudenda
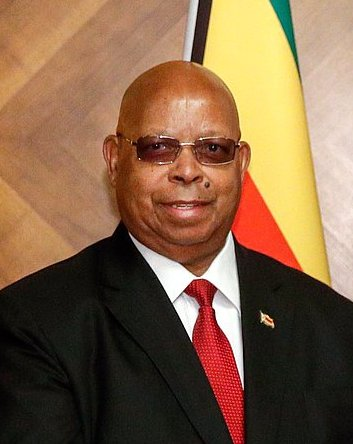
- Mudenda in 2022

Speaker of the National Assembly
- Incumbent
- Assumed office 3 September 2013
- President: Robert Mugabe 2013-2017; Emmerson Mnangagwa 2017-present
- Deputy: Tsitsi Gezi
- Preceded by: Lovemore Moyo

Secretary General of ZANU-PF
- Incumbent
- Assumed office September 2025
- Preceded by: Obert Mpofu

Provincial Governor of Matabeleland North
- In office 22 July 1985 – 1 April 1990
- President: Robert Mugabe
- Preceded by: Daniel Ngwenya
- Succeeded by: Jevan Maseko

Personal details
- Born: 31 May 1946 (age 80) Southern Rhodesia (now Zimbabwe
- Party: ZANU–PF
- Education: University of South Africa (BA); University of Zimbabwe (LLB)
- Profession: Lawyer, politician

Jacob Francis Nzwidamilimo Mudenda is the current Speaker of the National Assembly of Zimbabwe and Secretary General of the Zimbabwe African National Union - Patriotic Front (ZANU-PF). A longtime schoolteacher and lawyer, Mudenda joined the Zimbabwe political scene after it gained independence from the British in 1980. Mudenda is well known for his relationship with former Zimbabwe president, Robert Mugabe, along with the rise and fall of his political career after the Willowgate scandal.

== Background ==
Jacob Francis Mudenda was born in Zimbabwe. Mudenda earned numerous degrees before joining the workforce. Mudenda earned a Bachelor of Arts degree from the University of South Africa while majoring in English and education. He followed this degree by achieving his Bachelor of Laws honour degree from the University of Zimbabwe. In addition, he went back to school a third time to receive a Postgraduate Diploma in Law from the University of Zimbabwe. After gaining his second diploma from the University of Zimbabwe, Mudenda went on to practice law and teach in Zimbabwe until his decision to enter politics.

== Early political career ==
Upon independence in 1980 from British control, Mudenda was selected by the Mugabe government regime as a district administrator for the ZANU Party. Through connections to Mugabe personally and good results, Mudenda was soon promoted to the party's provincial administrator. On 22 July 1985, he was appointed Provincial Governor of Matabeleland North, succeeding Daniel Ngwenya, who had served in the post since March 1984. It was during Mudenda's term as Governor that the Gukurahundi massacres took place across Matabeleland. Gukurahundi took place from early 1983 to late 1987, leaving over 20,000 individuals dead, and Mudenda is considered to have been Mugabe's line of contact through the period. Mudenda was replaced as Governor on 1 April 1990 by Jevan Maseko.

== Willowgate scandal and aftermath ==
In the late 1980s, Mudenda, along with other members of the Zimbabwe government, were implicated in a scandal involving the illegal sales of cars. Mudenda, along with the other individuals involved, purchased vehicles from a legal importer in Willowvale at a low rate and would sell the vehicles at a highly inflated price. Mugabe, and many other politicians were involved in the investigation. Mudenda was found to have made more than 100,000 Zimbabwe dollars ($51,000) in the purchase and resale of one vehicle. The scandal ended the political careers of many individuals, including Maurice Nyagumbo. Mudenda, however, was able to make his way back into politics after years away from serving as a government official. In his time away from politics, Mudenda spent significant time establishing his law firm. The firm, Mudenda Attorneys Legal Practitioners, still practices in Bulawayo today.

== Return to politics ==
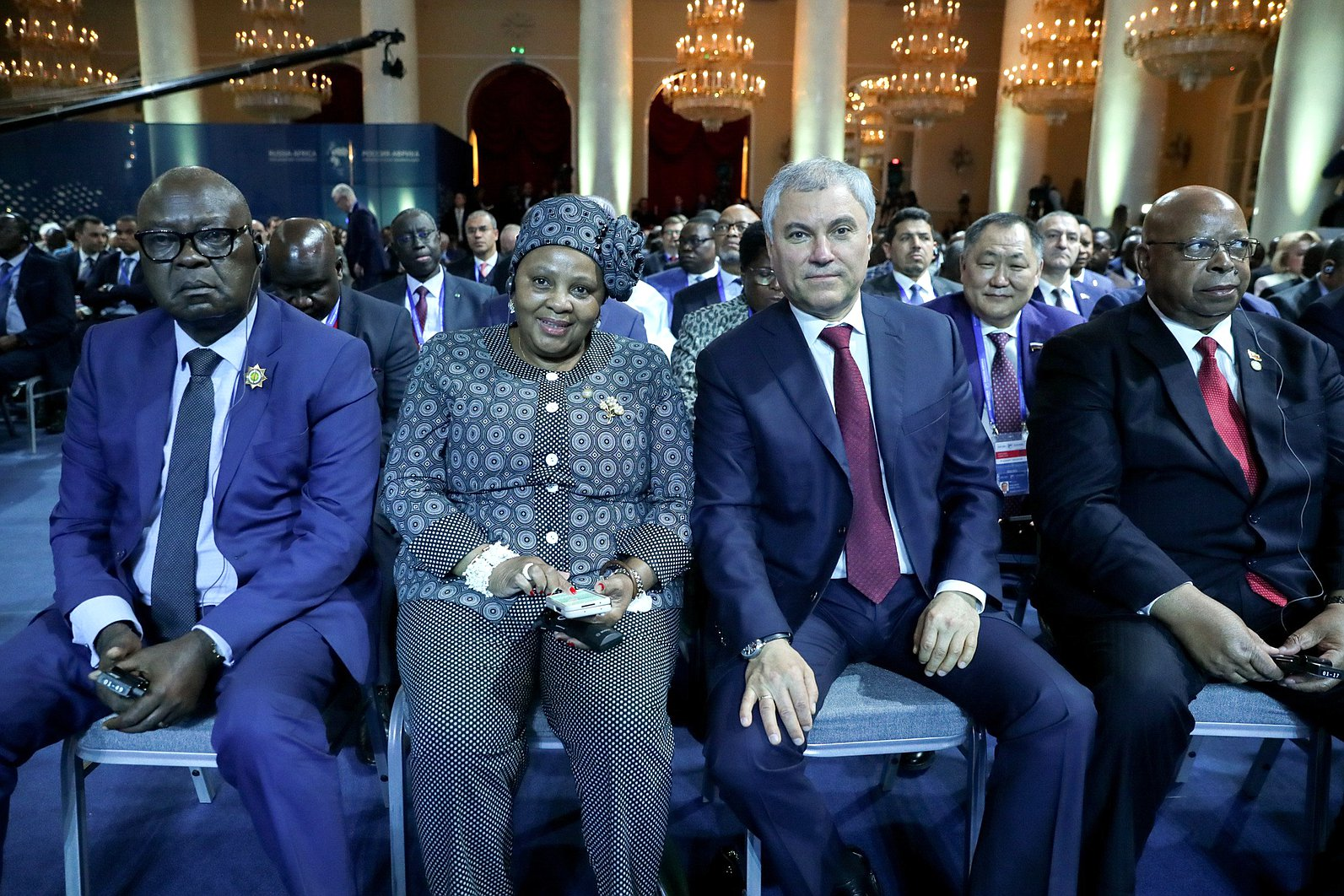
Mudenda, Nosiviwe Mapisa-Nqakula and Vyacheslav Volodin at the “Russia-Africa” parliamentary conference in Moscow on 20 March 2023

In February, 2013 Mudenda stepped back into the public sphere with his appointment as the chairman of the Zimbabwe Human Rights Commission (ZHRC). The return to politics did not come without controversy. Some in Zimbabwe felt that Mudenda's appointment did not follow constitutional procedures. Mudenda's appointment lasted only a short period of time, however, as he was elected the Speaker of the House on July 31 of the same year. On September 3, 2013 Mudenda took his position replacing former Speaker, Lovemore Moyo Mudenda has remained in the same position since his appointment in 2013.

== See also ==
- List of speakers of the National Assembly of Zimbabwe
