= Room No. 9 (film) =

1946 Indian film

- Directed by: B. D. Vedi
- Starring: Geeta Nizami; Shyam
- Release date: June 15, 1946
- Country: India
- Language: Hindi

Room No. 9, also known as Kamra Number Nau, is an Indian Hindi-language thriller drama film directed by B. D. Vedi, and starring Geeta Nizami and Shyam. The film was released on 15 June 1946 in Bombay and received mixed-to-negative contemporary reviews.

== Plot ==
Geeta, the heiress to a large fortune, arrives at Nishat Hotel in Poona under the guardianship of barrister Premchand. Mistaking the criminal Pratap for Premchand's son Shyam, she unknowingly places her trust in the wrong man while her greedy uncle plots to have her killed. After a series of kidnappings and chases, Shyam repeatedly rescues her. When Thakur Ajit Singh is murdered while attempting to assault Geeta, Shyam assumes responsibility for the crime to protect her and is convicted of murder. At the High Court, Premchand proves Shyam's innocence after Rani, Ajit Singh's mistress and Shyam's estranged mother, confesses to the killing out of jealousy. Shyam is exonerated, and the story ends happily.

== Cast ==
- Geeta Nizami as Geeta
- Shyam as Shyam
- K. N. Singh as Pratap
- Raj Bishwas as Barrister Premchand
- Saroj Borkar

== Release ==
Room No. 9 was released in Bombay on 15 June 1946. According to the newspaper The Bombay Chronicle, the film had a theatrical run of over seven weeks at Krishna Theatre in Bombay.

== Reception ==
Among contemporary reviews, a critic for The Bombay Chronicle noted that the film was intended as a "starring vehicle" for Nizami, but did not "exploit her talents as well as her maiden picture, Panna, did".

Critic Baburao Patel denounced the film as "unsuitable" for viewing of respectable families due to its sexual content. Patel concluded, "As an entertainer, the picture has no value at all either for the exhibitor or for the spectator. On the contrary, a filthy picture like this deserved to be banned by all decent people."

Film scholar Debashree Mukherjee notes the film for its depiction of synchronized labour as part of late colonial Bombay cinema's "aesthetics of vitality."
