= Minister of State for Provincial Affairs and Devolution for Matabeleland North =

- Incumbent; Richard Moyo since 10 September 2018
- Minister of State for Provincial Affairs
- Style: The Honourable
- Member of: Cabinet of Zimbabwe; Parliament of Zimbabwe
- Reports to: The President
- Seat: Mhlahlandlela Government Complex, Bulawayo
- Appointer: The President
- Term length: Five years, renewable for a second or subsequent term of office
- Constituting instrument: Provincial Councils and Administration Act (Chapter 29:11)
- Precursor: Provincial Governor of Matabeleland North
- Formation: 22 August 2013
- Deputy: Permanent Secretary for Provincial Affairs and Devolution
- Website: opcmatnorth.gov.zw

The Minister of State for Provincial Affairs and Devolution for Matabeleland North is the Provincial Minister of State for Matabeleland North in Zimbabwe. The minister oversees provincial affairs and sits in the Parliament of Zimbabwe. The minister is appointed by the President of Zimbabwe and is appointed for a term of five years, which can be renewed for a second or subsequent term. Historically, the minister held the title Governor of Matabeleland North, but the office has since been renamed to align with the 2013 Constitution of Zimbabwe, which does not allow for Provincial Governors.

== List of Ministers ==
Parliamentary position: Elected Member of the House of Assembly Elected Member of the Senate Non-Elected Minister

No.	Name Birth–Death	Term in office	Party	Appointed by
Provincial Governors
	Daniel Ngwenya (Note: Ngwenya had been elected to the House of Assembly in the 1980 elections.)	2 March 1984 – 22 July 1985	ZANU-PF	Robert Mugabe
	Jacob Mudenda (Note: Mudenda was a Senator following the 1985 elections. The Senate was abolished in 1987.) b. 31 May 1946	22 July 1985 – 1 April 1990	ZANU-PF	Robert Mugabe
	Jevan Maseko; 1 January 1943 - 20 May 2013	1 April 1990 – 1 January 1993	ZANU-PF	Robert Mugabe
	Welshman Mabhena; 6 October 2010 - 26 June 1944	1 January 1993 – 15 July 2000	ZANU-PF	Robert Mugabe
	Obert Mpofu b. 12 October 1951	15 July 2000 – 15 April 2005	ZANU-PF	Robert Mugabe
	Thokozile Mathuthu; 26 March 1957 - 13 August 2018	15 April 2005 – 28 June 2013	ZANU-PF	Robert Mugabe
Ministers of State for Provincial Affairs
	Cain Mathema b. 25 January 1947	25 August 2013 – 9 October 2017	ZANU-PF	Robert Mugabe
	Thokozile Mathuthu; 26 March 1957 - 13 August 2018	9 October 2017 – 21 November 2017	ZANU-PF	Robert Mugabe
	Cain Mathema b. 25 January 1947	4 December 2017 – 29 July 2018	ZANU-PF	Emmerson Mnangagwa
	Richard Moyo b. 12 October 1960	10 September 2018 – present	ZANU-PF	Emmerson Mnangagwa

== See also ==
- List of current provincial governors of Zimbabwe
