= Bengal Film Journalists' Association Award for Best Actress (Hindi) =

Indian film award

The Bengal Film Journalists' Association Awards is the oldest association of film critics in India, founded in 1937. Frequent winners include Meena Kumari, Shabana Azmi (4 awards), Nutan (3 awards), Vyjayanthimala, Mala Sinha, Tabu, Rani Mukherji (2 awards each).

== Multiple winners ==
Wins	Recipient
4	Meena Kumari
4	Shabana Azmi
3	Nutan
2	Mala Sinha
2	Vyjayanthimala
2	Tabu
2	Rani Mukherji

== 1930s ==
- 1938: – No award given
- 1939: – No award given

== 1940s ==
- 1940: – No award given
- 1941: – No award given
- 1942: Durga Khote – Charnon Ki Dasi
- 1943: – No award given
- 1944: – No award given
- 1945: Mehtab – Parakh
- 1946: Geeta Nizami – Panna
- 1947: – No award given
- 1948: – No award given
- 1949: – No award given

== 1950s ==
- 1950: – No award given
- 1951: – No award given
- 1952: – No award given
- 1953: – No award given
- 1954: – No award given
- 1955: – No award given
- 1956: – No award given
- 1957: – No award given
- 1958: Meena Kumari – Sharada
- 1959: – No award given

== 1960s ==
- 1960: – No award given
- 1961: – No award given
- 1962: Vyjayantimala – Gunga Jumna
- 1963: Meena Kumari – Aarti
- 1964: Nutan – Bandini
- 1965: Meena Kumari – Dil Ek Mandir tied with Mala Sinha – Jahan Ara
- 1966: Mala Sinha – Himalay Ki God Mein
- 1967: Waheeda Rehman – Teesri Kasam
- 1968: Nutan – Milan tied with Naina Sahu – Hare Kanch Ki Chooriyan
- 1969: Vyjayantimala – Sunghursh

== 1970s ==
- 1970: Suhasini Mulay – Bhuvan Shome
- 1971: Sharada – Samaj Ko Badal Dalo
- 1972: Rehana Sultan – Chetna
- 1973: Zeenat Aman – Hare Rama Hare Krishna tied with Meena Kumari – Pakeezah (Special Award)
- 1974: Nutan – Saudagar
- 1975: Shabana Azmi – Ankur
- 1976: Suchitra Sen – Aandhi
- 1977: – No award given
- 1978: – No award given
- 1979: – No award given

== 1980 ==
- 1980: – No award given
- 1981: – No award given
- 1982: – No award given
- 1983: – No award given
- 1984: – No award given
- 1985: – No award given
- 1986: Shabana Azmi – Paar
- 1987: Shabana Azmi – Ek Pal
- 1988: Smita Patil – Mirch Masala
- 1989: Rekha – Utsav

== 1990s ==
- 1990: – No award given
- 1991: – No award given
- 1992: Dimple Kapadia – Drishti
- 1993: Ashwini Bhave – Purush
- 1994: – No award given
- 1995: Kajol – Udhaar Ki Zindagi
- 1996: Farida Jalal – Mammo
- 1997: Tabu – Maachis
- 1998: – No award given
- 1999: Shabana Azmi – Godmother

== 2000s ==
- 2000: Pooja Bhatt – Zakhm
- 2001: Karisma Kapoor – Fiza
- 2002: Tabu – Chandni Bar
- 2003: Rani Mukerji – Saathiya
- 2004: Manisha Koirala – Escape From Taliban
- 2005: Priyanka Chopra – Aitraaz
- 2006: Rani Mukerji – Black
- 2007: Ayesha Takia – Dor
- 2008: – No award given
- 2009: – No award given

== 2010s ==
- 2010: – No award given
- 2011: – No award given
- 2012: – No award given
- 2013: – No award given

== See also ==
- BFJA Award
- Bollywood
- Indian Cinema
