= Richard Moyo =

Zimbabwean politician

The Honourable Richard Moyo MP

Minister of State for Provincial Affairs and Devolution for Matabeleland North
- Incumbent
- Assumed office 10 September 2018
- President: Emmerson Mnangagwa
- Preceded by: Cain Mathema

Member of Parliament for Umguza
- Incumbent
- Assumed office 26 August 2018
- President: Emmerson Mnangagwa
- Preceded by: Obert Moses Mpofu
- Constituency: Umguza
- Majority: 3,648 (18.0%)

Personal details
- Born: 12 October 1960 (age 65) Bulawayo
- Party: ZANU-PF

Richard Moyo is a Zimbabwean politician and former Minister of Health and Child Care. He is the current Provincial Affairs Minister and a member of parliament representing Matabeleland North. He is a member of ZANU–PF.

== Background ==
=== Early life ===
Richard Moyo was born on 12 October 1960, in Bulawayo, Zimbabwe. He grew up in a family of six children and was raised by his mother, a nurse, after his father's early passing. Moyo completed his primary and secondary education in Bulawayo before pursuing higher education at the University of Zimbabwe.

=== Career ===
Moyo started his career as a medical doctor and worked at several hospitals in Zimbabwe, including Harare Hospital and Parirenyatwa Hospital. He later became a lecturer at the University of Zimbabwe's Medical School and rose to the position of Head of the Department of Obstetrics and Gynaecology.

In 2013, Moyo entered politics and was appointed Minister of Health and Child Care, a position he held until 2018. During his tenure, he oversaw several major health initiatives, including the expansion of HIV/AIDS treatment programs and the introduction of new vaccines.

== Achievements ==
Some of Moyo's notable achievements include:

- Improving access to healthcare services, particularly in rural areas
- Increasing the number of medical professionals in the country
- Introducing new health programs, such as the National Cancer Treatment Program
- Strengthening partnerships with international organizations, such as the World Health Organization and UNICEF

=== Other ventures ===
In addition to his political career, Moyo has also worked as a consultant for several international organizations, including the World Bank and the Global Fund to Fight AIDS, Tuberculosis and Malaria. He has also served as a board member for several organizations, including the Zimbabwe Medical Council and the Health Professions Authority.

== Awards and honors ==
Moyo has received several awards for his contributions to healthcare and public service, including the Zimbabwe Medical Association's Lifetime Achievement Award and the African Minister of Health Award for Excellence in Healthcare Leadership.
