= Bibhuti Mitra =

Indian filmmaker (1915–1989)

- Born: 1915; Calcutta, Bengal Presidency, British India
- Died: 14 March 1989 (aged 73–74); Bombay, Maharashtra, India
- Occupations: Film director; producer
- Years active: 1943–1972

Bibhuti Mitra (1915 – 14 March 1989) was an Indian filmmaker. Born in Calcutta, he travelled to London after graduating to prepare for the Indian Civil Service examination. There, he met filmmaker Paul Czinner, who encouraged him to study cinematography at the British Institute of Film Technology. He subsequently assisted Czinner on Dreaming Lips (1936), Carol Reed on Climbing High (1938) and The Stars Look Down (1940), and Alfred Hitchcock on Jamaica Inn (1939).

Mitra returned to India in 1940 and joined the Indo-American Documentary Centre in Bombay. He made several short films before venturing into feature filmmaking with Angoothi (1943). He subsequently joined Filmistan Studios, where he directed the jubilee hits Safar (1946) and Shabnam (1949). The former proved to be Filmistan's first major success.

In the early 1950s, he made Shabistan (1951), which attracted attention following the death of its leading actor, Shyam, in an on-set accident during production. Mitra's subsequent directorial ventures included Shart (1954) and Durgesh Nandini (1956).

The musical Phagun (1958), directed by Mitra and starring Madhubala as a gypsy belle, also marked his debut as an independent film producer. Although it received mixed reviews, the film was a commercial success, becoming one of the year's highest-grossing films. During the 1960s, Mitra directed and produced Basant (1960), Ji Chahta Hai (1964) and Mahua (1969). His final project was Mehmil (1972).

Mitra died at age 74 in Bombay, Maharashtra, in 1989.

== Filmmaking style and reception ==
In a 1958 profile published in Swarajya, critic V. P. Sathe observed that Mitra's filmmaking continued to follow the commercial approach associated with Filmistan's Sashadhar Mukherjee, even after he left the studio. Sathe also described Mitra as a "successful director" who was likely to succeed as a producer.

Mitra's films at Filmistan—including Shabnam (1949), Shabistan (1951) and Shart (1954)—generally followed the studio's entertainment-oriented approach, which favoured simple romantic plots and musical sequences over political commentary. His later films, such as Durgesh Nandini (1956) and Phagun (1958), were criticised for relying on familiar storylines and "stock situations".

== Filmography ==
Year	Title	Notes	Ref.
1941	V for Victory	Short film; Allied propaganda film produced during World War II	
1943	Angoothi		
1946	Safar		
1949	Shabnam		
1951	Shabistan		
1954	Shart		
1956	Durgesh Nandini		
1958	Phagun	Also producer	
1960	Basant	Also producer	
1964	Ji Chahta Hai	Also producer	
1969	Mahua	Also producer	
1972	Mehmil	Also producer	
