= Durgesh Nandini (1956 film) =

1956 Hindi film

Durgesh Nandini is a Hindi historical drama film directed by Bibhuti Mitra and produced by Shashadhar Mukherjee. The film was based on Bankim Chandra Chattopadhyay's 1865 novel Durgeshnandini and released in 1956 under the banner of Filmistan studio.

== Plot ==
The film is set against the backdrop of the conflict between the Mughal and Rajput forces. Akbar appoints Raja Man Singh to campaign against the Afghan ruler. Man Singh sends Jagat Singh to investigate the activities of the Pathan forces at Burdwan. Jagat Singh encounters Durgesh Nandini and involves with her in a romantic relationship.

== Cast ==
- Pradeep Kumar as Kumar Jagat Singh
- Nalini Jaywant as Ayesha Banu
- Nigar Sultana as Bindra Rani
- Bina Rai as Durgesh Nandini
- Bipin Gupta as Virendra Singh
- Jeevan as Katlu Khan
- Ajit
- I. S. Johar
