= Aaj Aur Kal =

Aaj Aur Kal (meaning 'today and tomorrow' in Hindi and Urdu) may refer to:

- Aaj Aur Kal (1947 film), an Indian Hindi film directed by Khwaja Ahmad Abbas
- Aaj Aur Kal (1963 film), an Indian Hindi film produced and directed by Vasant Joglekar
- Aaj Aur Kal (1976 film), a Pakistani Urdu social film

== See also ==
- Today and Tomorrow (disambiguation)
- Love Aaj Kal (disambiguation)
- Aajkaal, Bengali-language newspaper in Kolkata, India
