= Karwat (1949 film) =

- Directed by: B. D. Vedi
- Produced by: B. R. Chopra
- Starring: Geeta Nizami; Satish
- Release date: 1949
- Country: India
- Language: Hindi

Karwat is a 1949 Indian Hindi-language film directed by B. D. Vedi and starring Geeta Nizami. It marked the debut of B. R. Chopra as a film producer, and narrated a story of refugees who arrived in India during the Partition. Although the film's direction is officially credited to Vedi, Chopra is also believed to have ghost-directed.

Karwat was a box-office bomb, which led to Chopra subsequently himself directing his productions. Two years after Karwat, he established himself as a director with the success of Afsana (1951).

== Cast ==
- Geeta Nizami
- Satish
- Jeevan
- Kesari
- Paro
- Leela Mishra

== Soundtrack ==
The soundtrack for Karwat was composed by Hansraj Behl.
