= John Banks Brady =

British-born Southern Rhodesian Soldier

Colonel John Banks Brady DSO OBE ED

Member of the Southern Rhodesian Legislative Assembly for Bulawayo East
- In office 14 April 1939 – 25 April 1946
- Preceded by: New constituency
- Succeeded by: David Wood Young

Member of the Southern Rhodesian Legislative Assembly for Bulawayo North
- In office 6 September 1933 – 14 April 1939 Serving with Allan Ross Welsh
- Preceded by: Sir Robert Hudson
- Succeeded by: Hugh Beadle

Personal details
- Born: 7 November 1875 Ennistymon, County Clare, United Kingdom
- Died: 13 February 1952 (aged 76) Bulawayo, Southern Rhodesia
- Resting place: Bulawayo General Cemetery
- Party: United Rhodesia Party; Rhodesia Party
- Education: Trinity College Dublin

Military service
- Allegiance: United Kingdom; Southern Rhodesia
- Branch/service: British Army
- Years of service: 1899–1937; 1939–1943
- Rank: Colonel
- Unit: King's Royal Rifle Corps; Southern Rhodesian Defence Force
- Battles/wars: Second Boer War; World War I World War II

Colonel John Banks Brady DSO OBE ED (7 November 1875 – 13 February 1952) was a British-born Southern Rhodesian soldier, educator and politician who served as the member for Bulawayo North along with Allan Ross Welsh from 1933 to 1935 and later Bulawayo East in the Southern Rhodesian Legislative Assembly.

== Early life ==
John Banks Brady was born on 7 November 1875 in Ennistymon to national bank manager John Henry Banks and Isabella Banks. He was educated at Midleton College and Trinity College Dublin. He is of Anglo-Irish descent.

== Career ==
=== South African War, settling in South Africa, and move to Southern Rhodesia ===
John Banks Brady arrived in South Africa in 1900 to fight in the Second Boer War. He remained in South Africa to pursue his career. In 1909, he went to Southern Rhodesia as a result of J. B. M. Hertzog's pro-Afrikaner and anti-British policies. Brady became the Inspector of Schools in Southern Rhodesia. On the outbreak of war in 1914, Brady was recommissioned as a Lieutenant in the reserves, and then promoted to captain in the King's Royal Rifle Corps in November 1914

=== Return to Southern Rhodesia and entrance to politics ===
Brady was the headmaster of the Milton School in Bulawayo from 1925 to 1930. He later entered politics and was elected the member of parliament for Bulawayo North along with Allan Ross Welsh in the 1933 Southern Rhodesian general election. Upon his retirement from the Army in 1937, he was promoted to Colonel. He was later elected the member of parliament for Bulawayo East in the 1939 election, a post he served in until 1946.

== Later life ==
With the outbreak of World War II, Brady returned to active service as a Military Observer and Liaison Officer for Southern Rhodesia to the Middle East Campaign. However, ill-health forced his retirement, and he was awarded the Officer of the Order of the British Empire (OBE) in 1943 for his service.

Brady died on 13 February 1952 at the age of 76 in Bulawayo General Hospital from cardiac syncope and lobar pneumonia.

== Honours ==
| Companion of the Distinguished Service Order (DSO) | 1917 |
| Officer of the Order of the British Empire (OBE) | Military Division, 1943 |
| Queen's South Africa Medal | 4 Clasps |
| 1914–15 Star | |
| British War Medal | |
| Victory Medal | MID Palm (4) |
| 1939–1945 Star | |
| Africa Star | |
| War Medal 1939–1945 | |
| King George VI Coronation Medal | Coronation 1937 |
| Efficiency Decoration (ED) | "Southern Rhodesia" Clasp |
| Croix de guerre 1914–1918 (France) | 1916 |

Educational offices
| Preceded by E. D. de Beer | Headmaster of the Milton School; 1925 – 1930 | Succeeded by H. G. Livingston |
Southern Rhodesian Legislative Assembly
| Preceded by Sir Robert Hudson | Member of Parliament for Bulawayo North; 1933 – 1939; Served alongside: Allan Ross Welsh | Succeeded by Hugh Beadle |
| New constituency | Member of Parliament for Bulawayo East; 1939 – 1946 | Succeeded by David Wood Young |
