= Shabistan (film) =

1951 Indian film

- Directed by: Bibhuti Mitra
- Produced by: Filmistan
- Starring: Shyam; Naseem Banu
- Music by: C. Ramchandra; Madan Mohan
- Release date: August 10, 1951
- Country: India
- Language: Hindi

Shabistan is a 1951 Indian Hindi-language film directed by Bibhuti Mitra, and produced by Filmistan. It stars Shyam along with Naseem Banu, and features a soundtrack composed by C. Ramchandra and Madan Mohan. An adaptation of The Prisoner of Zenda, Shabistan was set in a fictional Ruritanian-style kingdom. Midway during the production, on 25 April 1951, leading actor Shyam died due to an on-set accident.

The film was eventually finished by a body double for Shyam and marked the actor's final screen appearance. Shabistan was released on 10 August 1951 in Bombay, India.

== Cast ==
- Shyam
- Naseem Banu
- Helen as background dancer

== Music ==
The music for Shabistan was composed by C. Ramchandra and Madan Mohan.

== Production ==
Film writer Jerry Pinto identifies Shabistan as one of actress Helen's earliest screen appearances, where she performed as a background dancer among a large ensemble.

Midway during the production, on 25 April 1951, leading actor Shyam died due to an on-set accident. The film was eventually finished by a body double and marked Shyam's final screen appearance.

== Release ==
Shabistan was released in Bombay, India, on 10 August 1951. It later received international release in Somalia in 1952 and Hong Kong in 1954.

== Reception ==
The Times of India reported that the film was popular with audiences. However, the newspaper gave the film a negative review, commenting on its "manifold failures" and Shyam's sudden death.

Scholar Richard Allen considers Shabistan to be notable for its cinematography: "The camera observes and swivels to follow courtly goings on from a chandelier level angle, tracks characters across spaces, including through walls, and pivots to a 45-degree canted angle in shot/reverse shots that register conflict."
