= Shyam (actor) =

Indian actor (1920–1951)

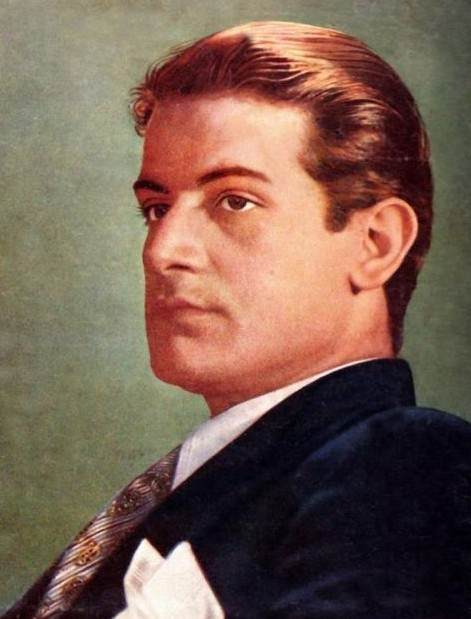
- Shyam c. 1943
- Born: Shyam Sundar Chadha; 20 February 1920; Sialkot, Punjab, British India
- Died: 25 April 1951 (aged 31); Bombay, Bombay State, India
- Education: Gordon College
- Occupation: Actor
- Years active: 1942–1951
- Spouse: Mumtaz Qureshi (m. 1949)
- Children: 2, including Sahira
- Relatives: Rahat Kazmi (son-in-law); Ali Kazmi (grandson)

Shyam Sundar Chadha (20 February 1920 – 25 April 1951), known mononymously as Shyam, was an Indian actor who worked in Hindi and Punjabi films. He made his screen debut in the Punjabi film Gowandhi (1942) before turning to Hindi cinema after being cast by W. Z. Ahmed in Man Ki Jeet (1944), a box-office success that brought him wider recognition. Following further roles in Room No. 9 (1946) and Aaj Aur Kal (1947), he established himself as one of the leading men of Hindi cinema in the late 1940s.

While many of his performances received mixed reviews, Shyam earned significant acclaim for portraying a Muslim youth raised by a Hindu family in Majboor (1948). A review by critic Baburao Patel predicted that he might "replace Motilal and Ashok Kumar as the latest matinee idol". Shyam subsequently starred in a string of commercially successful films that included Patanga, Dillagi (both 1949) and Samadhi (1950). Of these, Dillagi remains his best-known work.

Shyam's career was cut short when he died from injuries sustained in a horse-riding accident while filming Shabistan (1951), at the age of 31. In his obituary, The Times of India described him as the "most popular of the Indian screen's male stars". According to film historian Karan Bali, "many old-timers are convinced that if he survived, he would have given Dilip Kumar, Dev Anand and Raj Kapoor, the triumvirate of the '50s, a solid run for their money". Shyam was a close friend of writer Saadat Hasan Manto, who later commemorated him in several of his writings.

== Life and career ==
Shyam was born as Shyam Sundar Chadha on 20 February 1920 in Sialkot, Punjab but grew up in Rawalpindi. He graduated from Gordon College in Rawalpindi. His father, Sitaram Chadha used to work for the Indian Medical Service while his mother Charan Devi was a housewife. He was their eldest born, his younger siblings included brothers Harbans Lal, Jagadish Chander, Devender and a sister Pushpa.

Despite his father's opposition, Shyam aspired for a career in films. Besides acting in college plays, he also used to act in plays held across Rawalpindi. Shyam's uncle Tara Chand Chadha was in the British Army and he had minutely observed Shyam's interest in acting since the latter's young age. His uncle thereby advised his father not to stop Shyam from acting in films if he ever wants to. Now after completing his graduation, Shyam came to Lahore where he continued acting on stage. In 1941, he auditioned for a film role in a Bombay Talkies' production but failed. He subsequently took up a job as an assistant to director J. K. Nanda in Lahore, where he eventually made his screen debut with the Punjabi film Gowandhi (1942), produced by Kishorilal Shah and directed by G. R. Sethi. The same year he acted in his first Hindi film Khamoshi as well, opposite Ramola Devi, produced by R. C. Talwar under his banner Talwar Productions, Bombay.

After Khamoshi, he moved to Bombay and started acting in Hindi films. His first major role came in producer-director W. Z. Ahmed's drama Man Ki Jeet (1944) where he was cast opposite Ahmed's wife Neena, the film an adaptation of Thomas Hardy's novel Tess of the D’Urbervilles to an Indian setting. The film was a box office success, though Shyam received a rather mixed review from Baburao Patel of Filmindia: "A lot of noise seems to have been unnecessarily made about Shyam ... The man speaks in quite a natural manner but does not seem to know much about acting. He looks too gaunt and tall to fit a glamorous role [in which] his very appearance goes against him." The film's success established Shyam as a star.

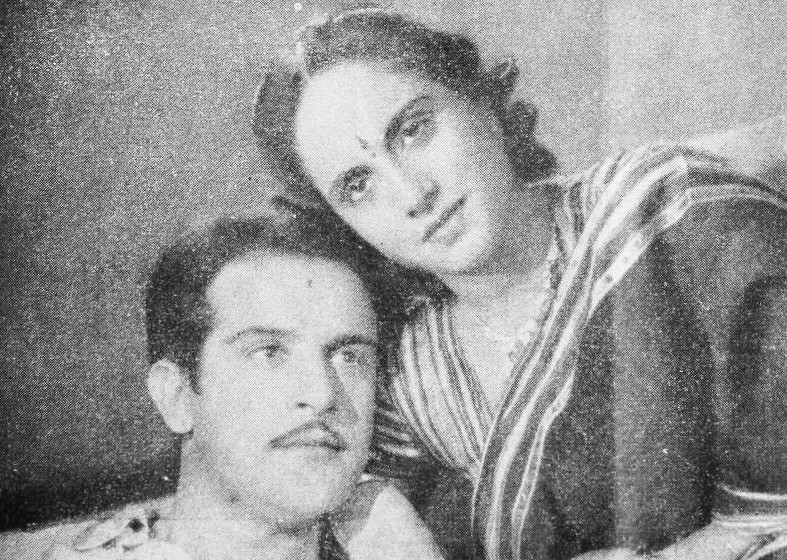
Shyam with actress Geeta Nizami in Room No. 9 (1946), one of his earliest films

Shyam had a short but significant role in B. D. Vedi's Room No. 9 (1946), starring Geeta Nizami. His work was well received by critics: Patel found the Shyam has "improved considerably" since Man Ki Jeet, while a review in The Bombay Chronicle described his performance as a "delicious cameo". In 1947, Shyam acted in K. A. Abbas' social drama Aaj Aur Kal.

His 1948 film Chandni Raat was popular with audiences, though his performance was seen by critics as lacking the dramatic intensity required for the role. Shyam's performance in Bombay Talkies' production Majboor (1948), as a Muslim youth facing dilemma over his Hindu upbringing, won him significant acclaim from Patel, who noted:

"He has to cover a very wide range of moods and expressions—all the way from frivolity to intense pathos—but he comes out with flying colours. Shyam so far has been classed among the 'promising' artistes of the Indian screen, but one never expected him to be capable of such versatility. With Majboor, he makes a bid for the front-rank of Indian stardom. Soon he may replace Motilal and Ashok Kumar as the latest matinee idol."

In 1949, he appeared in Dillagi, Chandni Raat and Naach opposite Suraiya. The song "Tu Mera Chand Main Teri Chandni..." picturised on them was sung by actor Shyam Kumar for Sundar Shyam Chadha on screen while Suraiya sang for herself. Shyam Kumar and Sundar Shyam Chadha were two different people. Shyam Kumar acted in several films in villainous roles in his long career, besides singing in several movies during the 1940s and early 1950s. 1949, Shyam married actress Mumtaz Qureshi (also called "Taji"). According to author Tilak Rishi, he "ruled the silver screen" during the period between 1949 and 1950. His popular films of 1949 included Kaneez and Patanga. The latter was one of the highest-grossing Indian films of the year, alongside another Shyam-starrer Dillagi, which is considered his best-known work. A musical featuring Suraiya as his love interest, Dillagi was described as a "record success" in contemporary news reports for having earned over ₹2,00,000 within five weeks of its release in the Bombay territory.

His 1950 releases included the political thriller Samadhi, in which he played the supporting role of a British forces captain in British India. The Bombay Chronicle found his characterization to be "unconvincing", but the film proved to be the year's top-grossing hit. The romantic comedy Meena Bazaar, co-starring Nargis, was also reported to be a major commercial success.

== Death ==
While it is known that Shyam died on 25 April 1951 at a young age of 31, it is largely believed that he died after falling from a horse while filming a scene for his film Shabistan (1951) at Ghodbunder Road, Bombay. Some sources state a horse-riding scene was being picturised on him when he fell down and was seriously injured while others state that after the scene was filmed, he was climbing down from the horse when the horse started running while Shyam was still not fully down, one of his legs got entangled with the horse's rope and the horse dragged him upto some distance and by the time, it stopped, Shyam was gravely injured, causing his death. However, the most authentic and believable cause of his death was actually provided by veteran make-up man Ram Tipnis who was present on the sets of this film, he was the makeup man of this film and was working under Filmistan. According to him, the incident took place after the shooting and packup. According to him, after packup, Shyam went away from the location alongside the crew but soon returned there as he was in a jovial mood to have a horseride and climbed up on the horse. But after a tiresome shooting all day, the horse rose up with his front two legs in air, making Shyam fall on the ground following which, the horse kept his front two legs upon Shyam. His head was gravely injured, making him unconscious. He was then immediately rushed to Bombay Hospital, where he eventually succumed to his injuries. Ram Tipnis had narrated this incident to film writer and author Dharmendra Nath Ojha, who was also the writer-director of the documentary Bombay of Manto. Because Manto and Shyam were close friends, Ojha had approached Tipnis when the latter narrated the incident to the former. Ojha himself had stated to film journalist and historian Shishir Krishna Sharma that the incident took place at the forest area of Ghodbunder Road beside Dahisar River, the area now been called Dahisarpur.

His death was a front-page report in The Times of India which read:

"High, wide and handsome Shyam, most popular of the Indian screen's male stars, idol of millions of film-goers throughout India and adored by lakhs in Bombay where he was mobbed at every appearance, went laughing off to work from his Chembur home on Wednesday morning. By afternoon, he was dead."

Shyam's few remaining scenes were completed with a body-double who had a similar height to him and filmed from behind without showing his face. Shabistan, co-starring Naseem Banu, was released in August 1951 and marked his final screen appearance.

Filmistan decided to honour Shyam's memory by instituting the Shyam Gold Medals, to be awarded annually to the best male and female artistes; the winners were to be selected by the Indian Motion Picture Producers' Association (IMPPA).

== Relationships and family ==
Shyam was one of the closest friends of Urdu writer Saadat Hasan Manto, whom he met after arriving to Bombay. Despite religious differences with Manto, Shyam maintained a strong friendship with him even after the Partition of India in 1947. According to Manto's writings, Shyam was romantically involved with several women including actresses Nigar Sultana, Ramola Devi, and Kuldip Kaur, though his wife remained his "one great weakness".

Academic Ishtiaq Ahmed notes that both Manto and Krishan Chander's obituaries on Shyam described him as an "exceptionally humane and broad-minded individual ... who took care of his stepmother and stepbrothers and sisters with great affection. He nevertheless always felt a great void in his life because his mother died when he was very small and he continued to miss her."

Shyam had two children from his marriage to Mumtaz Qureshi: daughter Sahira, and son Shekhar (later renamed as Shakir; born June 1951), who was born two months after Shyam's death. After his death in 1951, Qureshi migrated to Pakistan with her elder sister, Zeb, and settled in Lahore. Zeb Qureshi herself was a small-time actress, having acted in 4-5 films like Anokhi Ada (1948) and Naujawan (1951). The song from Anokhi Ada "Kahe Jiya Dole Ho Kaha Nahin Jaaye" sung by Tun Tun was picturised on Zeb Qureshi. Mumtaz Qureshi later married a man named Ansari, due to which Shyam's children were sometimes known by the surname Ansari. His daughter became an actress in Pakistani television industry, and married actor Rahat Kazmi; their children include the Pakistani-Canadian actor Ali Kazmi. Shakir Ansari is a psychiatrist and resides in England. Mumtaz Qureshi died in the year 2000 in Karachi. Shyam's nephew Bimal Chadha (Harbans Lal Chadha's son) was involved in The Times of India and Outlook and used to be involved in various social media groups (particularly Facebook) regarding the history of Hindi cinema and its music. He also wrote the biography Shyam – A Star Forgotten was published on 24 February 2024 by Bimal Chadha's family posthomously, he having passed away on 4 February 2022.

== Filmography ==
Year	Title	Role	Notes	Ref.
1942	Gowandhi (Punjabi)		Debut film	
1942	Khamoshi		First Hindi film	
1944	Man Ki Jeet			
1946	Room No. 9			
1947	Aaj Aur Kal			
1948	Majboor	Chandu		
1948	Shikayat			
1949	Bazaar			
1949	Chandni Raat			
1949	Char Din			
1949	Dada			
1949	Dillagi	Swaroop		
1949	Kaneez	Akhtar		
1949	Naach			
1949	Patanga	Shyam		
1949	Raat Ki Rani			
1950	Madari (Punjabi)	Havaldar	Cameo role	
1950	Meena Bazar	Shyam		
1950	Nirdosh			
1950	Samadhi	Suresh		
1950	Sangeeta			
1950	Surajmukhi			
1951	Kale Badal			
1951	Shabistan	Sameer	Following his death, the role was completed by a body double; released posthumously	

== Reception and legacy ==
In her book Stars Of The Indian Screen (1952), actress Sushila Rani Patel described Shyam as possessing "good height, well-cut features and poise", calling him "the dream boy of many a modern Punjabi girl". According to Ishtiaq Ahmed, Shyam was "one of the handsomest heroes of Bollywood". During his short career, he acted opposite several of the top actresses of the time such as Nargis, Suraiya, Nigar Sultana and Nalini Jaywant. His Dillagi co-star Suraiya said of him:

"I often thought of him as the Errol Flynn of India ... Shyam was very conscious of his height whenever he was on the sets with me, just as I was very conscious of my short stature whenever I worked with him. He was in the habit of teasing my granny often and had become almost a member of our family."

Following his death, Shyam became the inspiration to many of his friend Saadat Hasan Manto's stories. In his book Stars from Another Sky, Manto dedicated a chapter titled "Shyam: Murli Ki Dhun" to his friend, writing:

"When I think of Shyam, I am reminded of a character from a Russian novel. Shyam was a lover, but to him the act of love was not to be performed for its own sake. He was prepared to die for anything that was beautiful—and I think death must have been beautiful, otherwise he would not have died." (Note: Translated from Urdu by Khalid Hasan.)

According to film historian Karan Bali:

"Shyam passed away at the peak of his career, and many old-timers are convinced that if he survived, he would have given Dilip Kumar, Dev Anand and Raj Kapoor, the triumvirate of the '50s, a solid run for their money. At the time of his demise, Shyam was almost, if not as popular, as the '50s icons, besides being considered one of the most handsome leading men of Hindi cinema."

In 2024, a biography titled Shyam — A Star Forgotten was published by Blue Pencil. Originally researched over several decades as a passion project by Shyam's nephew, Bimal Chadha, (Note: Bimal (died 3 February 2022) was the son of Shyam's brother, Harbans, and a leading journalist in Delhi.) the manuscript was completed posthumously by Chadha's family and edited by film music historian Manek Premchand.

=== In popular culture ===
Tahir Raj Bhasin portrayed Shyam in Nandita Das' film Manto (2018), a biopic on the writer.
