= Basant (1960 film) =

- Directed by: Bibhuti Mitra
- Produced by: Mitra Productions
- Starring: Shammi Kapoor; Nutan
- Music by: O. P. Nayyar
- Release date: 1960
- Country: India
- Language: Hindi

Basant is a 1960 Indian Hindi-language road film directed by Bibhuti Mitra. It stars Shammi Kapoor and Nutan, and is an adaptation of the American film It Happened One Night (1934). The music was composed by O. P. Nayyar.

The film was released in Bombay at Novelty Theatre on 19 January 1962. A Times of India critic described it as an "incoherent tale full of absurdities".

Writing for Eastern Eye in 2023, Asjad Nazir named Basant one of Shammi Kapoor's top 20 films.

== Cast ==
- Shammi Kapoor
- Nutan
- Johnny Walker
- Minoo Mumtaz
- Kammo
- Cuckoo
- Pran
