= Tsitsi Gezi =

Zimbabwean politician

The Honourable Tsitsi Gezi MP

Deputy Speaker of the National Assembly
- Incumbent
- Assumed office 11 September 2018
- President: Emmerson Mnangagwa
- Speaker: Jacob Mudenda
- Preceded by: Mabel Chinomona

Member of Parliament for the Mashonaland Central Women's Quota
- Incumbent
- Assumed office 22 August 2013
- President: Robert Mugabe; Emmerson Mnangagwa
- Preceded by: New office

Personal details
- Born: 9 August 1970 (age 55) Lomagundi
- Party: ZANU-PF
- Spouse: Border Gezi

Tsitsi Gezi is a Zimbabwean politician from ZANU–PF. She is a women's quota representative for Mashonaland Central Province and was elected Deputy Speaker on 11 September 2018 and re-elected on 8 September 2023.
