= Geeta Nizami =

Indian actress

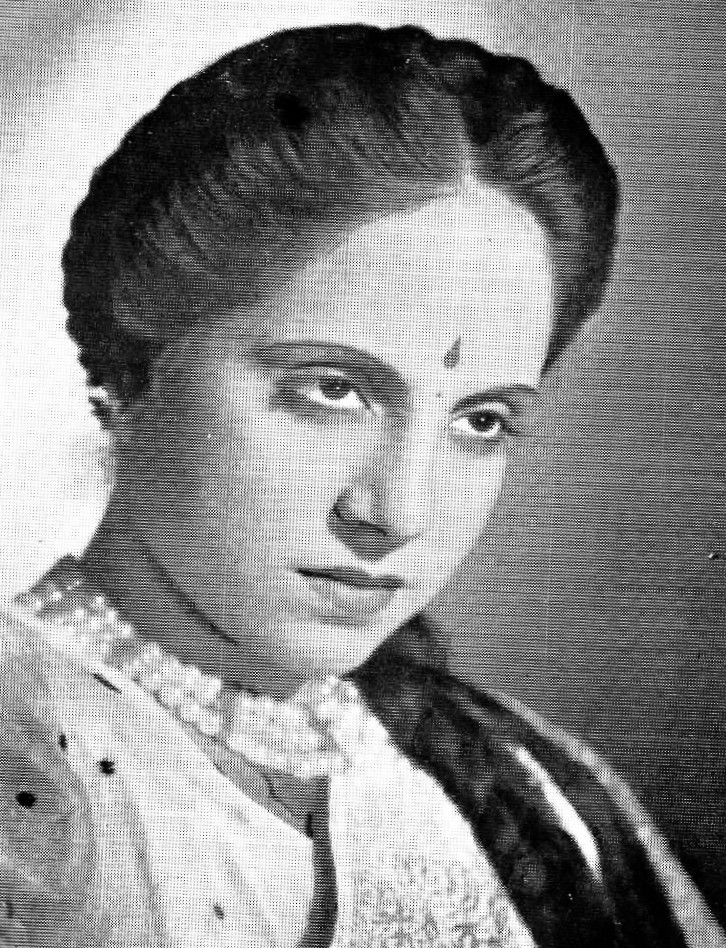
- Geeta in Din Raat (1945)
- Born: Rashida Begum; 1926; Lahore, British India
- Died: 2008 (aged 81–82); Pakistan
- Other name: Geeta Vedi
- Occupations: Actress; dancer
- Years active: 1944–51
- Spouse(s): Barkat Nizami (m. 1940; div. 1946) B. D. Vedi (m. 1946; sep. 1948)
- Relatives: Mumtaz Shanti (niece; through first marriage)

Rashida Begum (1926–2008), better known by the stage name Geeta Nizami, was an Indian actress who worked in Hindi-language films. She was particularly known for her dancing skills. Her notable films include Panna (1944), Gajre (1948), Beqasoor (1950) and Hulchul (1951).

Geeta won the BFJA Award for Best Actress (Hindi) for her performance in Panna (1944). For the same film, according to the 1946 book Filmdom: The All-India Film Directory & Who's Who in the Indian Film Industry, Geeta became the first artiste on the Indian screen to be rewarded a sum of ₹9,000 by the Government of India.

== Early life ==
Geeta was born as Rashida Begum in 1926, in a family based in Lahore, British India.

== Career ==
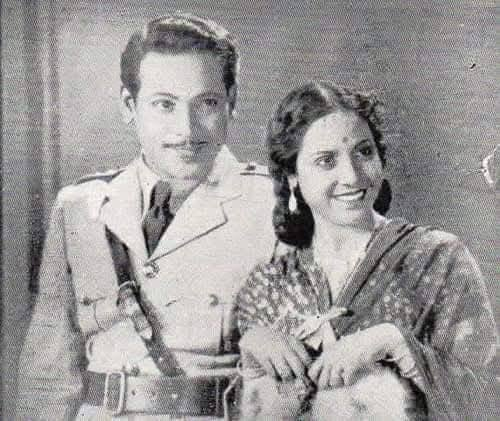
Geeta with P. Jairaj in the war thriller Panna (1944)

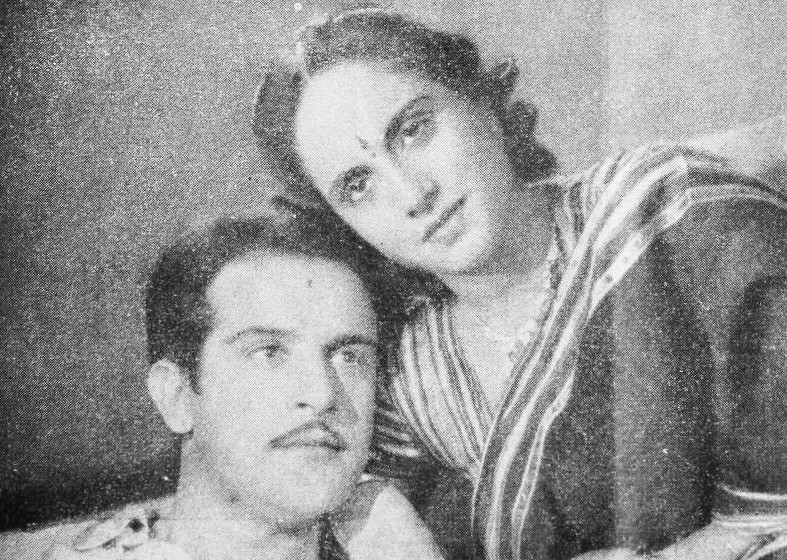
Geeta with Shyam in her husband's thriller Room No. 9 (1946)

Geeta began her acting career with the successful Mann Ki Jeet (1944). She had her breakthrough in the war thriller Panna (1944). The film proved to be a runaway success and opened her to public recognition. For her performance in Panna, Geeta received a sum of ₹9,000 as a reward from the Government of India. She also won the BFJA award for Best Actress (Hindi) for her work.

Geeta subsequently appeared in a supporting role in the Muslim social drama Gaon Ki Gori (1945), which was one of the highest grossing films of the year. This initial success was followed by lead roles in the romance Sassi Punnu and the thriller Room No. 9 (both 1946); the latter being directed by her then-husband B. D. Vedi. She played the titular character in Paroo (1947), a drama criticising prevalent casteism in Indian society, to mixed reviews.

Geeta later shifted to supporting roles in high-profile productions, which included Gajre (1948), Beqasoor (1950) and Hulchul (1951). Her only film in lead role during this period was Karwat (1949), produced by B. R. Chopra and directed by Vedi. The film was a box office flop.

Geeta migrated to Pakistan in 1952, where she continued working on stage.

== Personal life ==
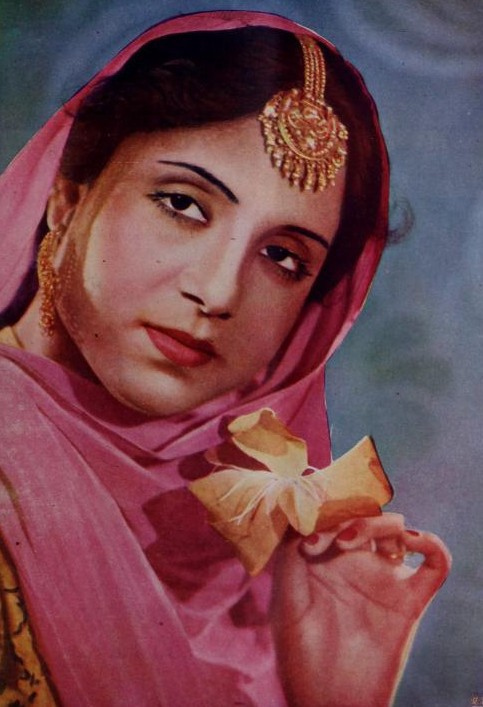
Geeta in 1945

In 1940, Geeta married film director Barkat Nizami (the uncle of actress Mumtaz Shanti), whom she divorced quickly.

In 1946, Geeta married film director B. D. Vedi in Kolhapur after converting from Islam to Hinduism. The couple was separated by 1948. She briefly used the name "Geeta Vedi" during this period.

She reportedly shifted to the newly-created Pakistan in April 1952.

Geeta died in 2008.

== Filmography ==
Year	Film	Role	Notes
1944	Man Ki Jeet		
1944	Panna	Panna	
1945	Gaon Ki Gori		
1946	Sassi Punnu		
1946	Room No. 9		
1947	Paroo	Paroo	
1948	Gajre	Tara	
1949	Karwat		
1950	Beqasoor	Radha	
1951	Hulchul		

== Awards ==
Year	Award	Work	Result	Ref.
1946	Bengal Film Journalists' Association – Best Actress Award (Hindi)	Panna (1944)	Won	
