= Today and Tomorrow =

Today and Tomorrow can refer to:

== Film and television ==
- Today and Tomorrow (1912 film), by Michael Curtiz
- Today and Tomorrow (2003 film), by Alejandro Chomski
- "Today and Tomorrow" (Fear the Walking Dead), an episode of American TV series Fear the Walking Dead

== Music ==
- Today and Tomorrow (McCoy Tyner album), 1964
- Today & Tomorrow (Sault album) album by Sault, 2022
- Today & Tomorrow, a 2005 EP by Matt Wertz

== Other uses ==
- To-day and To-morrow, a series of speculative essays published by Kegan Paul in the 1920s

== See also ==
- Aaj Aur Kal (disambiguation) (lit. 'Today and Tomorrow' in Hindi-Urdu)
