= Shabnam (1949 film) =

- Poster
- Directed by: Bibhuti Mitra
- Written by: Qamar Jalalabadi
- Screenplay by: Bibhuti Mitra
- Story by: Helen Devi
- Produced by: Filmistan Ltd.
- Starring: Dilip Kumar; Kamini Kaushal; Jeevan; Cuckoo; Paro
- Cinematography: Marshall Branganza
- Edited by: Pundalik
- Music by: Sachin Dev Burman
- Production company: Filmistan Ltd.
- Distributed by: Filmistan Ltd.
- Release date: 22 April 1949
- Country: India
- Language: Hindi

Shabnam (transl. Dew Drops) is a 1949 Hindi movie produced by Filmistan and directed by Bibhuti Mitra. The film stars Dilip Kumar, Kamini Kaushal, Jeevan and Shyama. The film's music is by Sachin Dev Burman.

== Cast ==
- Dilip Kumar as Manoj
- Kamini Kaushal as Shanti
- Jeevan as Prince Anaadi Barua
- Cuckoo
- Murad
- Paro
- Rajinder Singh
- Shyama

== Crew ==
- Art - D. Malvanker
- Dance - Satyanarayan, N. Sharma
- Audiography - M. M. Kaka

== Music ==
While Sachin Dev Burman provided the music direction, the lyrics were written by Qamar Jalalabadi.

Song	Singer(s)
"Dekho Aayi Pehli Mohabbat Ki Raat..."	Shamshad Begum
"Ik Baar Tu Ban Ja Mera O Pardesi..."	Shamshad Begum
"Kadar Meri Na Jani Chhod Ke Jane Wale..."	Shamshad Begum
"Yeh Duniya Roop Ki Chor Bacha Le Mere Babu..."	Shamshad Begum
"Pyaar Mein Tumne Dhokha Seekha Yeh Toh Bataon Kaise..."	Shamshad Begum & Mukesh
"Tu Mahal Mein Rehnewali, Main Kutiyaan Mein Rehnewala..."	Shamshad Begum & Mukesh
"Tumhare Liye Hue Badnaam, Na Bhoole Phir Bhi Tumhara Naam..."	Shamshad Begum & Mukesh
"Kismet Mein Bichhadna Thha, Huyi Kyun Unse Mulaqat Re..."	Mukesh & Geeta Dutt
"Mera Dil Tadpa Kar Kahan Chala..."	Geeta Dutt
"Hum Kisko Sunaye Haal Yeh Duniya Paise Ki..."	Lalitabai Deulkar

== Reception ==
When Indian film actor Manoj Kumar saw this movie at the age of 12–13, he was so impressed with Dilip Kumar's character's name that he decided to change his screen name to Manoj Kumar if he ever became a film actor.
