= Safar (1946 film) =

- Directed by: Bibhuti Mitra
- Produced by: Filmistan
- Starring: See below
- Music by: C. Ramchandra
- Release date: 2 November 1946
- Country: India
- Language: Hindi

Safar is a 1946 Indian Hindi-language film directed by Bibhuti Mitra. Its cast included Shobha, Kanu Roy, V. H. Desai, S. L. Puri, Rajendra, Chandrika, and Haroon.

The film premiered at Roxy Cinema, Bombay, on 2 November 1946. It was Filmistan's first silver jubilee hit.

The soundtrack of Safar, composed by C. Ramchandra, included Mohammed Rafi's breakthrough song, "Kehke Bhi Na Aaye Tum".

== Cast ==
- Shobha
- Kanu Roy
- V. H. Desai
- S. L. Puri
- Rajendra
- Chandrika
- Haroon
