= Speaker of the National Assembly of Zimbabwe =

(in other official languages)
| Northern Ndebele | USomlomo weNdlu yabaMeli |
| Shona | Mutauriri weDare reVanodzika Mitemo ye Nyika |
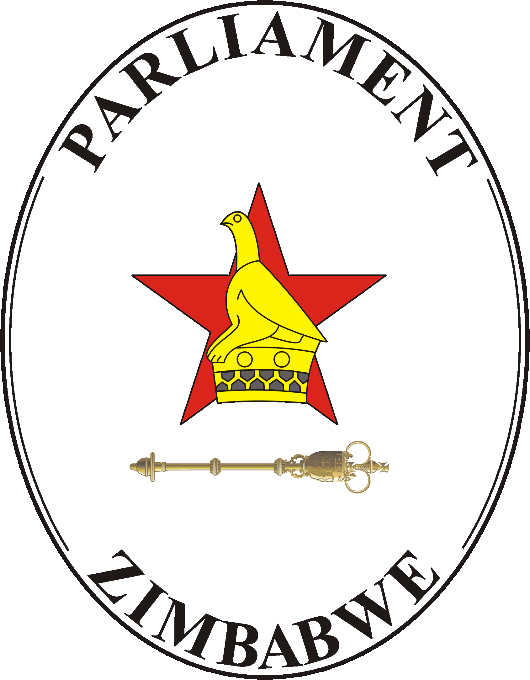
- Logo of the Parliament of Zimbabwe

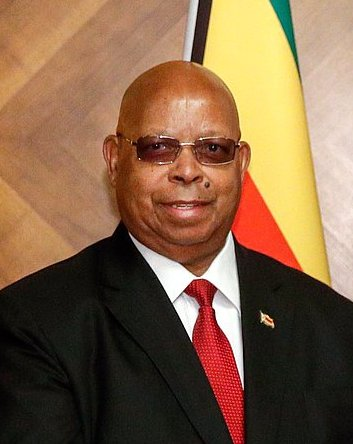
- Incumbent; Jacob Mudenda since 3 September 2013
- National Assembly of Zimbabwe
- Style: Mr Speaker (informal and within the house); The Honourable (formal)
- Status: Presiding officer
- Member of: National Assembly
- Seat: New Parliament Building, Zimbabwe
- Appointer: House of Assembly, approved and sworn in by the Chief Justice
- Term length: Seven years elected by the National Assembly at the start of each parliament, and upon a vacancy
- Constituting instrument: Constitution of Zimbabwe
- Precursor: Speaker of the House Assembly of Rhodesia
- Inaugural holder: Lionel Cripps (Southern Rhodesia); Didymus Mutasa (Zimbabwe)
- Formation: 1924 (as Speaker of the Legislative Assembly of Southern Rhodesia); 1980 (post-independence)
- First holder: Lionel Cripps (Southern Rhodesia); Didymus Mutasa (Zimbabwe)
- Deputy: Deputy Speaker
- Website: Official website

The Speaker of the National Assembly of Zimbabwe is the presiding officer of the National Assembly, the lower house of the Parliament of Zimbabwe. The Speaker is responsible for maintaining order and decorum during debates, ruling on points of order and privilege, and representing the National Assembly in its relations with the President, the Senate, and the public. The office combines procedural authority with a degree of ceremonial and representative functions.

The Speaker is elected by the National Assembly itself from among its members (or persons qualified to be elected) and is expected to act impartially in the chair, although the officeholder is typically a member of the majority party. The current Speaker is Jacob Mudenda, who has held the position since 22 August 2013.

== Role and functions ==
The Speaker presides over sittings of the National Assembly and is responsible for the orderly conduct of business in accordance with the Standing Orders. Key functions include:

- Ruling on points of order, questions of privilege, and procedural matters;
- Maintaining order and decorum, including the power to name members for disorderly conduct;
- Representing the National Assembly in official capacities, including communications with the President and the Senate;
- Presiding over joint sittings of Parliament when required;
- Certifying certain procedural matters, such as notices for constitutional amendments.

The Speaker does not participate in debates or vote, except to exercise a casting vote in the event of a tie. The Speaker is also responsible for the administration of the National Assembly in conjunction with the Clerk of Parliament.

== History ==
The office of Speaker has its roots in the colonial period. In Southern Rhodesia, the Legislative Assembly was established following the grant of responsible government in 1923. The first Speaker, Lionel Cripps, was elected on 30 May 1924 and served until 1935. Subsequent Speakers included Allan Ross Welsh and others who presided over the Legislative Assembly during the colonial and Federation eras.

Following the unilateral declaration of independence in 1965, the institution continued as the House of Assembly of Rhodesia, with a Speaker presiding. The role was carried forward into the short-lived Zimbabwe-Rhodesia period in 1979.

Upon independence in 1980, the office was retained in the new Parliament of Zimbabwe. The first post-independence Speaker was Didymus Mutasa, who served from 1980 to 1990. The role evolved under successive constitutions, with the 2013 Constitution providing a clearer framework for election, tenure, and functions while maintaining continuity with the pre-independence tradition of an independent presiding officer.

== Election and tenure ==
The Speaker is elected by the National Assembly at its first sitting after a general election (and whenever a vacancy arises). The election is conducted by secret ballot under the supervision of the Zimbabwe Electoral Commission, in accordance with the Standing Orders. A person is qualified for election if they are or have been a member of the National Assembly or are qualified to be elected as such.

Upon election, the Speaker ceases to be a constituency member of the National Assembly (the seat is filled by a by-election or other mechanism under electoral law). The Speaker takes the oaths of loyalty and office before the Chief Justice or the next most senior available judge.

The Speaker vacates office on the day the National Assembly first meets after a general election, upon resignation, upon accepting certain public offices, or if removed by a resolution supported by at least two-thirds of the total membership of the National Assembly. The Speaker's term is therefore tied to the life of the Parliament, subject to these provisions. Following the 2026 constitutional amendments, the term of Parliament, and thus the Speaker, was extended from five to seven years.

== Deputy Speaker ==
The National Assembly also elects a Deputy Speaker from among its members shortly after electing the Speaker. The Deputy Speaker presides in the absence of the Speaker and performs other functions as required. The Deputy Speaker vacates office upon ceasing to be a member of the National Assembly or upon removal by a two-thirds resolution. The current Deputy Speaker is Tsitsi Gezi.

== Impartiality and conventions ==
The Speaker is expected to exercise the office with strict impartiality in all procedural matters, rising above partisan considerations once elected to the chair. Although Speakers have almost invariably been drawn from the ranks of the majority party (or supported by it), the officeholder is required to resign any formal party positions upon election and to act independently when presiding over debates, ruling on points of order, and maintaining order in the House. This expectation of neutrality is a core convention of the office and is reinforced by the requirement that the Speaker take an oath of office before the Chief Justice or another senior judge.

The convention of impartiality is rooted in the Westminster parliamentary model inherited from the colonial period. In Southern Rhodesia, Speakers of the Legislative Assembly (from 1924 onwards) were expected to preside fairly and without favour, even though they were typically aligned with the governing party of the day. This tradition of procedural independence continued through the Rhodesia and Zimbabwe-Rhodesia periods and was carried forward into the post-independence Parliament of Zimbabwe.

In practice, Speakers have generally been members of the ruling party, consistent with the Westminster-influenced system. However, once in the chair they are expected to apply the Standing Orders even-handedly, protect the rights of all members (including those in opposition), and ensure that minority views can be expressed within the rules of debate. The Speaker does not participate in debates and votes only in the event of a tie, exercising a casting vote in accordance with established precedent (usually to allow further debate or to maintain the status quo).

The 2013 Constitution further strengthens the principle of independence by protecting the Speaker from removal except by a resolution supported by at least two-thirds of the total membership of the National Assembly. This supermajority requirement is designed to prevent the office from being used as a partisan tool and to safeguard the Speaker’s ability to act without fear of arbitrary dismissal by a simple majority. The Speaker may also resign by announcing the decision in the House or by written notice to the Clerk of Parliament.

These conventions and protections collectively aim to ensure that the Speaker functions as an impartial guardian of parliamentary procedure rather than as an agent of the executive or the majority party.

== See also ==
- List of speakers of the National Assembly of Zimbabwe
- National Assembly of Zimbabwe
- Parliament of Zimbabwe
