= Love Today =

Love Today may refer to these in Indian media:

- "Love Today" (song), a 2007 song by Mika
- Love Today (1997 film), an Indian Tamil-language romantic drama film starring Vijay
- Love Today (2004 film), an Indian Telugu film
- Love Today (2022 film), an Indian Tamil film

== See also ==
- Love Aaj Kal (disambiguation)
