= 1911 Southern Rhodesian Legislative Council election =

The Southern Rhodesia Legislative Council election of 12 April 1911 was the fifth election to the Legislative Council of Southern Rhodesia. The Legislative Council had, since 1907, comprised thirteen voting members: the Administrator of Southern Rhodesia ex officio, five members nominated by the British South Africa Company, and seven members elected by registered voters from four electoral districts. The Resident Commissioner of Southern Rhodesia, Robert Burns-Begg also sat on the Legislative Council ex officio but without the right to vote.

== Boundaries ==
The boundaries of the districts were slightly changed at this election. Only minor changes were made to the Eastern and Northern Districts, but a substantial area of territory around Kariba and Gokwe was removed from the Midlands District to the Western District.

== Results ==
| Constituency Electorate and turnout | Candidate | Votes |
|---|---|---|
| EASTERN | Francis Rudolph Myburgh* | 156 |
| EASTERN | John Meikle | 123 |
| EASTERN | James Harpur | 119 |
| EASTERN | Lionel Cripps | 42 |
| MIDLAND; 996 (68.8%) | Herman Melville Heyman | 392 |
| MIDLAND; 996 (68.8%) | William Henry Gilfillan | 116 |
| MIDLAND; 996 (68.8%) | Theodore Haddon | 93 |
| MIDLAND; 996 (68.8%) | Herbert Thomas Longden* | 85 |
| NORTHERN; Two members 2,363 (57.1%) | Frederick Eyles | 874 |
| NORTHERN; Two members 2,363 (57.1%) | Raleigh Grey* | 595 |
| NORTHERN; Two members 2,363 (57.1%) | Ernest Edward Homan | 470 |
| WESTERN; Three members | Charles Patrick John Coghlan* | unopposed |
| WESTERN; Three members | Gordon Stewart Drummond Forbes* | unopposed |
| WESTERN; Three members | George Mitchell | unopposed |

* Incumbents

== Nominated members ==
The members nominated by the British South Africa Company were:

- Clarkson Henry Tredgold, Attorney-General
- Dr Eric Arthur Nobbs PhD BSc FHAS, Director of Agriculture
- James Hutchison Kennedy, Master of the High Court
- Ernest William Sanders Montagu, Secretary for Mines and Works
- Francis James Newton CVO CMG, Treasurer

Clarkson Henry Tredgold was absent during the second session of the Legislative Council, and was replaced by Robert Macilwaine (Acting Attorney-General) from 30 November 1911.
