= Mehmil =

- Directed by: Bibhuti Mitra
- Produced by: Bibhuti Mitra
- Starring: Shiv Kumar; Farah; Shatrughan Sinha
- Release date: 1972
- Country: India
- Language: Hindi

Mehmil is a 1972 film starring Shiv Kumar and Farah. It was produced and directed by Bibhuti Mitra, with music by Sonik Omi.

== Cast ==
- Farah
- Shatrughan Sinha
