= 1939 Southern Rhodesian general election =

- 14 April 1939

All 30 seats in the Legislative Assembly 16 seats needed for a majority
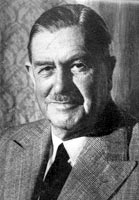

	First party	Second party
Leader	Godfrey Huggins	Harry Davies
Party	United	Labour
Last election	24 seats	5 seats
Seats won	23	7
Seat change	▼1	▲2
Popular vote	11,161	7,353
Percentage	50.37%	33.18%
- Composition of the Legislative Assembly after the election
Prime Minister before election
Godfrey Huggins
United
Elected Prime Minister
Godfrey Huggins
United

General elections were held in Southern Rhodesia on 14 April 1939, the fifth elections since the colony of Southern Rhodesia was granted internal self-government. Prime Minister Godfrey Huggins' United Party government were re-elected in a landslide. The elections were called slightly earlier than the deadline as Huggins feared the German invasion of Czechoslovakia would lead to European War.

== Electoral system ==
In 1937, a new Electoral Act was passed. The franchise was extended slightly to those who were not British subjects but who had been in active wartime service in the armed forces. Electors were also required to have lived for three months in their electoral districts. The requirement for qualifying for the vote on the basis of receiving salary or wages of £100 per annum was extended also to people with income of £100 per annum, a change which principally benefited those who had investment income but few assets. Voters were also no longer required to demonstrate proficiency in English through a dictation test. The postal vote, which had been introduced in 1928, was extended in 1937 to all voters living more than 25 miles away from the nearest polling station. Finally, those who had drawn government rations were disenfranchised.

A boundary revision in 1938 enabled the elimination of the four remaining double-member electoral districts as the Colony was split into 30 single-member districts.

== Results ==
Party	Votes	%	Seats	+/–
United Party	11,161	50.37	23	–1
Rhodesia Labour Party	7,353	33.18	7	+2
Reform Party	2,773	12.51	0	–1
Union Party	380	1.71	0	New
Independents	492	2.22	0	New
Total	22,159	100.00	30	0
Registered voters/turnout	28,032	–		
Source: Willson

=== By constituency ===
Avondale
Party	Candidate	Votes	%	±%
United	Harry Bertin	571		N/A
Labour	Colin Ross McLachlan	217		N/A
Majority		354		N/A
Turnout		962	82.9	N/A
United win (new seat)				

Bulawayo Central
Party	Candidate	Votes	%	±%
United	William Hives Eastwood	393		
Reform	James Cowden	272		
Labour	Philip Harvey Veale	251		
Majority				
Turnout		1,116	82.1	
United win (new seat)				

Bulawayo East
Party	Candidate	Votes	%	±%
United	John Banks Brady	639		
Reform	Donald MacGillivray	227		
Majority				
Turnout		1,025	84.5	
United win (new seat)				

Bulawayo North
Party	Candidate	Votes	%	±%
United	Hugh Beadle	461		
Reform	Charles Edward Harrison	243		
Labour	William John Phelps	165		
Majority				
Turnout		1,023	84.9	
United win (new seat)				

Bulawayo South
Party	Candidate	Votes	%	±%
Labour	Donald MacIntyre	534		
United	Robert Woodward Hammond	461		
Majority				
Turnout		1,279	77.8	
Labour hold		Swing		

Charter
Party	Candidate	Votes	%	±%
United	Ernest Lucas Guest	355		
Union Party	Johan Christoffel Kruger	181		
Labour	Henry Stephen Sharp	151		
Majority				
Turnout		838	82.3	
United hold		Swing		

Eastern
Party	Candidate	Votes	%	±%
United	Jacobus Petrus De Kock	399		
Union Party	Douglas Abrahamson	199		
Labour	Reginald Herbert Bruce Dickson	182		
Majority				
Turnout		1,004	77.7	
United hold		Swing		

Gatooma
Party	Candidate	Votes	%	±%
Labour	Thomas Alfred Kimble	416		
United	James Dalton	293		
Reform	Thomas James Golding	173		
Majority				
Turnout		1,031	85.5	
Labour hold		Swing		

Gwanda
Party	Candidate	Votes	%	±%
United	Frank Ernest Harris	381		
Reform	David Wood Young	216		
Majority				
Turnout		839	71.2	
United gain from Reform		Swing		

Gwelo
Party	Candidate	Votes	%	±%
United	Frank Delano Thompson	326		
Reform	Robert Williamson	243		
Labour	William John Bassett	184		
Majority				
Turnout		954	78.9	
United hold		Swing		

Hartley
Party	Candidate	Votes	%	±%
United	Hugh Volant Wheeler	264		
Reform	William Muter Leggate	215		
Independent	Henry Hamilton Beamish	196		
Labour	John Allen	121		
Majority				
Turnout		969	82.1	
United gain from Independent		Swing		

Highlands
Party	Candidate	Votes	%	±%
United	Leslie Benjamin Fereday	447		
Labour	William Frith Wilson	267		
Reform	John Arthur Douglas Hawksley	68		
Majority				
Turnout		953	82.1	
United win (new seat)				

Hillside
Party	Candidate	Votes	%	±%
Labour	Harry Davies	544		
United	George Victor Wallace	329		
Majority				
Turnout		1,017	85.8	
Labour win (new seat)				

Insiza
Party	Candidate	Votes	%	±%
United	Robert Clarkson Tredgold	335		
Labour	James Turner Durward	198		
Reform	Leo George Robinson	116		
Majority				
Turnout		887	73.2	
United hold		Swing		

Lomagudi
Party	Candidate	Votes	%	±%
United	Lewis Aloys MacDonald Hastings	393		
Labour	Otilia Liebermann	142		
Majority				
Turnout		834	64.1	
United hold		Swing		

Marandellas
Party	Candidate	Votes	%	±%
United	William Henry Ralston	366		
Labour	Alexander Aitken Draper	148		
Reform	Alfred William Vincent Crawley	147		
Majority				
Turnout		891	74.2	
United hold		Swing		

Mazoe
Party	Candidate	Votes	%	±%
United	Edward Walter Lionel Noaks	402		
Labour	Jack Herbert Keightley	139		
Reform	James Murdoch Eaton	75		
Independent	Mark Douglas Claxton	73		
Majority				
Turnout		873	78.9	
United hold		Swing		

Que Que
Party	Candidate	Votes	%	±%
United	Charles Walter Leppington	434		
Labour	de Lacey Henry Stowe	422		
Majority				
Turnout		1,072	79.9	
United hold		Swing		

Raylton
Party	Candidate	Votes	%	±%
Labour	Lawrence John Walter Keller	559		
United	Charles Spencer	210		
Majority				
Turnout		954	80.6	
Labour hold		Swing		

Salisbury Central
Party	Candidate	Votes	%	±%
United	Edgar Pope Vernall	408		
Labour	Gladys Maasdorp	288		
Reform	George Harry Stone	139		
Majority				
Turnout		1,089	76.4	
United win (new seat)				

Salisbury City
Party	Candidate	Votes	%	±%
United	Jacob Hendrik Smit	519		
Labour	Alec Pelham	276		
Majority				
Turnout		1,012	78.6	
United win (new seat)				

Salisbury Gardens
Party	Candidate	Votes	%	±%
United	Sir Percival Donald Leslie Fynn	410		
Reform	Lancelot Middleton Foggin	155		
Labour	Rex Atherton Rawstorne	111		
Majority				
Turnout		966	76.4	
United win (new seat)				

Salisbury North
Party	Candidate	Votes	%	±%
United	Godfrey Huggins	unopposed		
Majority		862		
Turnout				
United win (new seat)				

Salisbury South
Party	Candidate	Votes	%	±%
Labour	George Henry Walker	546		
United	Heiman Joseph Hoffman	283		
Majority				
Turnout		1,049	79.0	
Labour hold		Swing		

Selukwe
Party	Candidate	Votes	%	±%
United	Max Danziger	410		
Reform	Ernest Millington	321		
Majority				
Turnout		954	76.6	
United hold		Swing		

Umtali North
Party	Candidate	Votes	%	±%
United	Edgar Whitehead	498		
Labour	Thomas Norris	209		
Majority				
Turnout		844	83.8	
United hold		Swing		

Untali South
Party	Candidate	Votes	%	±%
Labour	James Brown Lister	401		
Independent	Matthew Henry Gibson	223		
Majority		820	76.	
Turnout				
Labour hold		Swing		

Victoria
Party	Candidate	Votes	%	±%
United	William Alexander Eustace Winterton	497		
Labour	Robert Joseph Austin	286		
Majority				
Turnout		1104	77.2	
United hold		Swing		

Wankie
Party	Candidate	Votes	%	±%
Labour	Allan Watson Whittington	346		
United	Cyril Mainwaring Newman	311		
Reform	Henry Robert Barbour	73		
Majority				
Turnout		1,000	73.0	
Labour gain from United		Swing		

Western
Party	Candidate	Votes	%	±%
United	Patrick Bissett Fletcher	366		
Labour	Albert James Davies	247		
Reform	Wilfred Denton Estment	93		
Majority				
Turnout		894	79.0	
United win (new seat)				

== Byelections ==
=== Salisbury Gardens ===
Sir Percival Fynn died on 25 April 1940. Owing to the war, normal party politics had been suspended and a joint selection conference including members of both the United Party and the Rhodesia Labour Party was included. Four candidates stood for the selection: Cecil Douglas Dryden (United Party), Mrs. Gladys Maasdorp (Rhodesia Labour Party), Arthur William Redfern (Independent) and O.P. Wheeler (Independent). Redfern was selected and returned unopposed on 26 June 1940.

=== Umtali North ===
Edgar Whitehead resigned from the Assembly on 24 June 1940. A byelection was held to replace him on 27 August 1940.

Constituency Electorate and turnout	Candidate	Party	Votes
UMTALI NORTH; 821 (53.8%)	Tom Ian Finlay Wilson	UP	312
UMTALI NORTH; 821 (53.8%)	Thomas Norris	Lab	130

=== Hartley ===
Hugh Volant Wheeler resigned on 30 June 1940. A byelection was held in his constituency on 27 August 1940.

Constituency Electorate and turnout	Candidate	Party	Votes
HARTLEY; 943 (49.9%)	William Muter Leggate	RP	247
HARTLEY; 943 (49.9%)	Tom Cecil Leonard Howard	Ind	120
HARTLEY; 943 (49.9%)	Leonard Tolcher Tracey	Ind	104

=== Lomagundi ===
Lewis Aloys MacDonald Hastings resigned on 30 June 1940. A byelection was held in his constituency on 27 August 1940.

Constituency Electorate and turnout	Candidate	Party	Votes
LOMAGUNDI; 827 (48.1%)	George Henry Hackwill	UP	220
LOMAGUNDI; 827 (48.1%)	Edward George Holman	Ind	178

=== Victoria ===
William Alexander Eustace Winterton resigned on 30 October 1940. A byelection was held on 10 December 1940.

Constituency Electorate and turnout	Candidate	Party	Votes
VICTORIA; 1,014 (61.4%)	Walter Brumage Richards	UP	232
VICTORIA; 1,014 (61.4%)	Harry Joseph Filmer	Lab	228
VICTORIA; 1,014 (61.4%)	Richard Fraser Dott	Ind National	163

=== Insiza ===
Robert Clarkson Tredgold resigned on 28 February 1943. A byelection was held on 21 April 1943 to replace him.

Constituency	Candidate	Party	Votes
INSIZA	Leslie Thomas Smith	The Labour Party	280
INSIZA	Victor Henry Sauerman	Lab	197
INSIZA	John Everett Chick	UP	151

== Sources ==
- Source Book of Parliamentary Elections and Referenda in Southern Rhodesia 1898–1962 ed. by F.M.G. Willson (Department of Government, University College of Rhodesia and Nyasaland, Salisbury 1963)
- Holders of Administrative and Ministerial Office 1894–1964 by F.M.G. Willson and G.C. Passmore, assisted by Margaret T. Mitchell (Source Book No. 3, Department of Government, University College of Rhodesia and Nyasaland, Salisbury 1966)
