= Love Aaj Kal =

Love Aaj Kal (lit. 'Love today and tomorrow') may refer to:

- Love Aaj Kal (2009 film), an Indian Hindi-language romantic comedy-drama film
- Love Aaj Kal (2020 film) or Love Aaj Kal 2, an Indian Hindi-language romantic comedy-drama film, sequel to the 2009 film

== See also ==
- Love Today (disambiguation)
- Aaj Aur Kal (disambiguation)
- Love Aaj Kal Porshu, a 2020 Indian Bengali-language romantic film by Pratim D. Gupta
