= Angoothi =

- Directed by: Bibhuti Mitra
- Starring: Ashok Kumar
- Release date: 1943
- Country: India
- Language: Hindi

Angoothi is a 1943 Indian Hindi-language film directed by Bibhuti Mitra and starring Ashok Kumar.
