= Shart (1954 film) =

- Directed by: Bibhuti Mitra
- Produced by: Filmistan
- Starring: Shyama; Deepak
- Music by: Hemant Kumar
- Release date: 1954
- Country: India
- Language: Hindi

Shart (Hindi : शर्त, Translation : condition) is a 1954 black-and-grey film directed by Bibhuti Mitra, starring Shyama, Deepak, Shashikala, I. S. Johar in lead roles. The music was given by Hemant Kumar and lyrics were written by S.H. Bihari. The film was produced by Filmistan and is loosely based on Alfred Hitchcock's Strangers on a Train.

== Cast ==
- Shyama as Kamini
- Deepak as Robin
- I.S. Johar as Hiten
- Moolchand as shop owner
- Mohana as Manisha
- Kanwal as Head of Police Dept
- Chaman Puri as Doctor

== Soundtrack ==
The music of the film was composed by Hemant Kumar and lyrics were written by S.H. Bihari.

Song	Singer
"Ae Mere Chaman"	Lata Mangeshkar
"Meri Taqdeer Ke Malik"	Lata Mangeshkar
"Piya Main To Huyi Bawari"	Lata Mangeshkar
"Dekho Woh Chand Chupke Karta Hai Kya Ishaare"	Lata Mangeshkar, Hemant Kumar
"Mohabbat Mein Meri Tarah"	Hemant Kumar
"Na Yeh Chand Hoga"	Hemant Kumar
"Na Yeh Chand Hoga"	Geeta Dutt
"Chand Ghatne Laga"	Geeta Dutt
"Dil Mera Hai Deewana"	Asha Bhosle
"Chala Kafila Pyar Ka"	Asha Bhosle
"Jana Na Chhodke"	Asha Bhosle
"Mere Humsafar"	Asha Bhosle

== Reception ==
Cineplot said of the film, "Shart, to which filmgoers had been looking forward with expectations whetted by studio reports, was disappointing."
