= Jeevan =

Jeevan is an Indian sub-continent first name meaning "life" or "bringer of life," which may be used by males or females. The name originates from the Sanskrit language but is more often used as a Nepalese language name, a Sikh or a Hindu name. Alternative spellings are Geevan, Gevan, Jiivan, Jeevan Prabhat Jaivan, Givan, Jevan, Jamaliya, Jamal, Jivanshi or Jivan.

== People named Jeevan ==
- Jeevan (Hindi actor) (1915–1987), Indian actor
- Jeevan (Tamil actor)
- Jeevan Kumar, Indian politician
- Jeevan Mendis (born 1983), Sri Lankan cricketer
- Jeevan Thondaman (born 1994), Sri Lankan politician

== People named Jevan ==
- Jevan Anderson (born 2000), Scottish footballer
- Jevan Maseko (1943–2013), Zimbabwean military officer, politician, and ambassador
- Jevan Snead (1987–2019), American college football player
