= Gajre (film) =

- Directed by: R. D. Mathur
- Written by: Khaquan Hussein
- Produced by: Allied Arts Production
- Starring: Suraiya; Motilal; Geeta Nizami
- Release date: 1948
- Country: India
- Language: Hindi

Gajre is a 1948 Indian drama film directed by R. D. Mathur and produced by Allied Arts Production. It stars Suraiya, Motilal and Geeta Nizami. The story and dialogue are written by Khaquan Hussein.

== Cast ==
- Suraiya as Asha
- Motilal as Mohan
- Geeta Nizami as Tara
- Agha as Sohan
- Sakantha as Mohan's father
- Marutirao Parab

== Music ==
The film's music was composed by Anil Biswas, with lyrics by G. S. Nepali. Its soundtrack features some of the earliest songs of Lata Mangeshkar.

The song "Door Papiha Bola" proved to be popular, and is noted for using piano and keyboard instruments, uncommon at the time.

== Reception ==
Baburao Patel of filmindia negatively reviewed the film: "With Suraiya singing as many songs as one woman can and throwing her clumsy weight about in gliding movements, hardly any one in the audience gets interested enough to sit through Gajre which has become one long marathon of killing boredom." He, however, praised Motilal, comparing his performance to that of Noël Coward in The Scoundrel (1935).

Gajre was reported to be unpopular among audience.
