= Allan Ross Welsh =

Rhodesian lawyer and politician

The Honourable Sir Allan Ross Welsh CMG
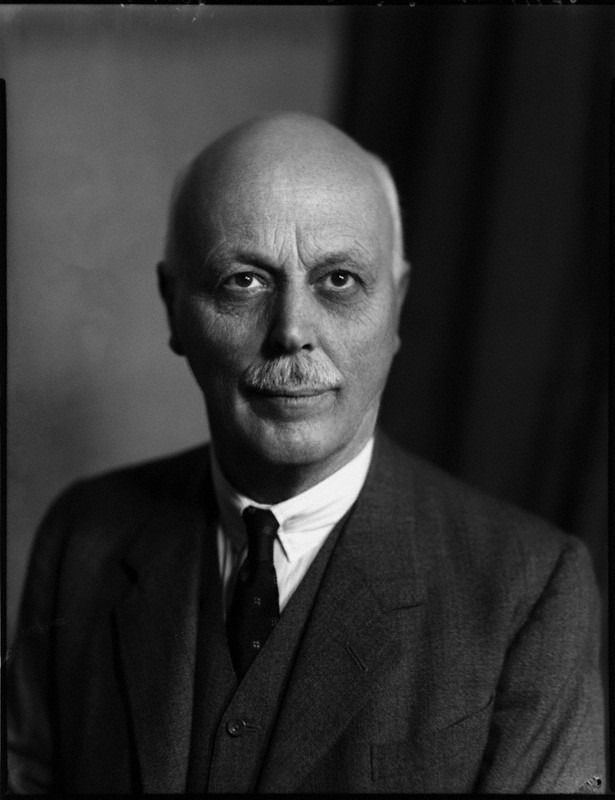
- Sir Allan Ross Welsh, 1937

2nd Speaker of the Legislative Assembly
- In office 11 March 1935 – 18 March 1952
- Preceded by: Lionel Cripps
- Succeeded by: Tom Ian Findlay Wilson

Member of the Southern Rhodesian Legislative Assembly for Bulawayo North
- In office 18 November 1927 – 14 April 1939 Serving with: Robert James Hudson (1927–1933); John Banks Brady (1933–1935)
- Preceded by: Sir Charles Coghlan
- Succeeded by: Hugh Beadle

Personal details
- Born: 8 July 1875 Bedford, Cape Colony (now South Africa)
- Died: 1957 (aged 81–82) Bulawayo, Southern Rhodesia (now Zimbabwe)
- Spouse: Lady Maude Marianne Welsh
- Profession: lawyer, politician
- Awards: Knight Bachelor, Companion of the Order of St Michael and St George, Grand Commander of the Order of the Phoenix

Sir Allan Ross Welsh CMG (8 July 1875 – 1957) was a Rhodesian lawyer and politician. He was Speaker of the Southern Rhodesian Legislative Assembly from 1935 to 1952.

== Early life and family ==
Welsh was born in Bedford, Cape Colony to Alexander Robert Welsh, a Presbyterian clergyman from Scotland, and Jessie Solomon}. He was educated at Dale College in King William's Town. He passed his final law exams in 1896 and was admitted to the Cape Supreme Court as an attorney and notary.

In 1901, Welsh married Maude Marianne Smit, daughter of N.H. Smit JP of Seymour, Cape Province, and had three daughters.

== Legal career ==
In 1897, Welsh went to work as a clerk in the firm of Solomon and Thomson, founded by his uncle Sir Edward Philip Solomon, in Johannesburg. Two years later he joined the firm of Frames and Grimmer in Bulawayo as managing clerk. Charles Coghlan arrived in Bulawayo in 1900 and the firm became Frames and Coghlan. However, in 1902 Frames left for Johannesburg and dissolved the partnership with Coghlan. Welsh became a partner of the firm on 1 January 1903 and they practised as Coghlan and Welsh.

In 1907, the firm opened an office in Salisbury with Bernard Tancred as partner and the firm changed name to Coghlan, Welsh and Tancred. When Tancred died in 1911, Coghlan invited Ernest Lucas Guest to join as partner and the firm changed to Coghlan, Welsh and Guest.

== Politics ==
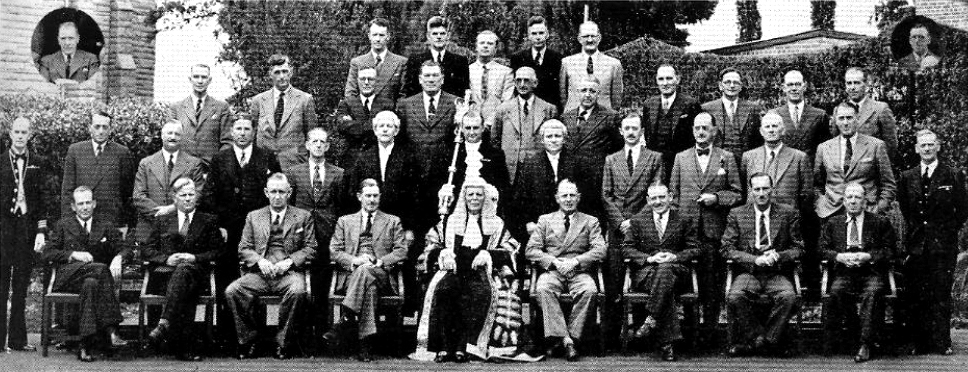
The Southern Rhodesian Legislative Assembly in 1948. Allan Ross Welsh is in the centre of the front row in his robes

Welsh was elected in 1927 to the Southern Rhodesian Legislative Assembly as the member for Bulawayo North, replacing Sir Charles Coghlan, who had died in office, and was re-elected several times until 1935. He succeeded Lionel Cripps as Speaker of the Assembly in 1935 and served until 1952. Cripps was not a member of the House and Welsh did not contest any further elections after 1935.

== Business activities ==
Welsh was a director of Rhodesia Sugar Refinery, Ltd and of Knitting and Clothing Factory.

== Honours ==
He was knighted in July 1943 as a Knight Bachelor and in 1952, he was appointed Companion of the Order of St Michael and St George and also granted permission to retain the title The Honourable, having served more than three years as Speaker of the Legislative Assembly of Southern Rhodesia.

He was also appointed Grand Commander of the Order of the Phoenix by King Paul of Greece in 1950, in recognition of services rendered during the Second World War.

== Death and legacy ==
Welsh died in Bulawayo aged 82. He was photographed by the Bassano studio in London in 1937 and the prints reside with the National Portrait Gallery, London.

Southern Rhodesian Legislative Assembly
Preceded by Sir Charles Coghlan	Member of Parliament for Bulawayo North; 1927 – 1939; Served alongside: Hudson/Brady	Succeeded by Hugh Beadle
Preceded by Lionel Cripps	Speaker of the Legislative Assembly; 1935 – 1952	Succeeded by Tom Ian Findlay Wilson
