= Lionel Cripps =

Lionel Cripps, CMG (11 October 1863 – 3 February 1950), was the first Speaker of the Southern Rhodesian Legislative Assembly.

Born in Simla, India, and educated in England, he was the son of a General in the Bengal Staff Corps. Cripps moved to South Africa in 1879, where he took up farming. In 1890, Cripps served as a trooper in A Troop of the Pioneer Column that occupied Mashonaland before prospecting in the Mazoe district and eventually settling near Umtali to farm tobacco. In doing so, he became the first farmer in Rhodesia to raise tobacco as a commercial crop. There he represented farmers in the region as head of a "vigilance committee", raising their grievances with Cecil Rhodes and demanding political rights within Rhodesia.

On 6 April 1893, he married Mary Lovemore in Cape Town. Together, they had four sons (Lionel, Hereward, Harold, and Derick) and one daughter, Angela.

In 1903, Cripps helped established and led the influential Rhodesian Agricultural Union (RAU), a body representing settler farmers. He attempted to parlay his stature in the community into a political career, unsuccessfully contesting Eastern Constituency in the 1911 Southern Rhodesian Legislative Council election before his election to the Southern Rhodesian Legislative Council in 1914. Re-elected in 1920, Cripps was elected the inaugural speaker of the Legislative Assembly in 1923.

Upon his retirement from politics in 1935, Cripps helped establish the National Archives and served as a member of the Historical Monuments Commission and developed a passion for Rock art, making copies of all known rock art in Rhodesia. Many of his reproductions of rock paintings and drawings are archived at the University of Zimbabwe's Archaeological Unit and an academic study of his work, entitled Immortalising the Past - Reproductions of Zimbabwean Rock Art by Lionel Cripps, was released in 2007.

Cripps died in Umtali, Southern Rhodesia.

== Sources ==
- Cooke, CK (1965) "Evidence of Human Migrations from the Rock Art of Southern Rhodesia", Africa: Journal of the International African Institute, Vol. 35, No. 3.

Southern Rhodesian Legislative Council
New constituency	Member for Bulawayo South; 1914 – 1920	Succeeded by Francis Hadfield
Preceded by George Mitchell	Member for Bulawayo District; 1920 – 1924	Council dissolved
Southern Rhodesian Legislative Assembly
New title	Speaker of the Legislative Assembly; 1924 – 1935	Succeeded by Allan Ross Welsh
