= Aaj Aur Kal (1947 film) =

- Directed by: Khwaja Ahmad Abbas
- Written by: Khwaja Ahmad Abbas
- Starring: Shyam; Arif
- Music by: Khurshid Anwar
- Release date: 1947
- Country: India
- Language: Hindustani

Aaj Aur Kal is a 1947 Indian Hindustani film. The film is directed by Khwaja Ahmad Abbas.

== Cast ==
- Shyam
- Arif
- Nita
- Nayantara

== Music ==
The music for the film is composed by Khurshid Anwar with lyrics penned by Sohan Lal Sahir and Zahir Kashmiri.

- "Kaliyon Ko Masalane" - Singer: Naseem Akhtar
- "Ao Sathi Ao" - Singer: Zeenat Begum, Imadad Husain
- "Pade Ishq Mein" - Singer: Zeenat Begum
- "Jam Utha Le O Pine" - Singer: Naseem Akhtar
