= Filmistan =

Indian film studio in Mumbai

Coordinates: 19.165114°N 72.845626°E

Filmistan is an Indian film studio based in Goregaon, Mumbai. Spread over five acres, near Patkar College on S.V. Road, the studio has seven shooting floors, and a temple and garden for outdoor locations. It previously operated as a film production company as well. Patkar College's reputation has increased due to this studio.

== History ==
Shashadhar Mukherjee, Rai Bahadur Chunilal (father of music director Madan Mohan), Ashok Kumar, and Gyan Mukherjee left Bombay Talkies (film production company and studio 1934-1953) after the death of director Himanshu Rai and founded Filmistan Studios with the funds given by Osman Ali Khan, the Nizam of Hyderabad, in 1943.

Nasir Hussain, who joined Filmistan in 1948 as a writer, was successful as a screenwriter for films such as Anarkali, Munimji and Paying Guest. He started film direction with Tumsa Nahin Dekha and became a successful director. Filmistan produced a number of hit movies in the 1940s and 1950s, including hits such as Shaheed (1948), Shabnam (1949) and Sargam (1950) and successful films such as Anarkali (1953) and Nagin (1954). Other notable films were Jagriti (1954), which won the Filmfare Best Movie Award in 1956, Munimji (1955), Tumsa Nahin Dekha (1957) and Paying Guest (1957).

However, in 1958, Mukherjee left Filmistan to established his own studio, Filmalaya, and continued to produce films, such as Love in Shimla (1960) and Ek Musafir Ek Hasina (1962).

Eventually, Tolaram Jalan bought the studio from Sashadhar Mukherjee and Ashok Kumar in the late 1950s.

In the following years, the studio wound down. Dooj Ka Chand made in 1964, and directed by Nitin Bose, was one of the last films to come out of Filmistan Studios. The premises continued to function as a studio, with recent films such as Ra.One (2011) and Bodyguard (2011), shot there. Yash Raj Films' television serial Khote Sikkey and dance reality show Jhalak Dikhhla Jaa are shot there.

In 2011, Jalan refuted media reports, which claimed that the studio was up for sale. The present studio manager of Filmistan studio is Jasraj Purohit. More recently, the song "Offo" from the film 2 States (2014), was partly filmed at Filmistan Studio.

== Filmography ==
Year	Title	Director	Music by
1944	Chal Chal Re Naujawan	Gyan Mukherjee	Ghulam Haider
1945	Mazdoor	Nitin Bose	Hari Prasanna Daas
1946	Eight Days		S. D. Burman
1946	Shikari		S. D. Burman
1946	Safar	Bibhuti Mitra	C. Ramchandra
1947	Do Bhai	Munshi Dil	S. D. Burman
1948	Nadiya Ke Paar	Kishore Sahu	C. Ramchandra
1948	Shaheed	Ramesh Saigal	Ghulam Haider
1949	Shabnam	Bibhuti Mitra	S. D. Burman
1950	Sargam	P. L. Santoshi	C. Ramchandra
1951	Shabistan	Bibhuti Mitra	C. Ramchandra, Madan Mohan
1952	Anand Math	Hemen Gupta	Hemant Kumar
1953	Anarkali	Nandlal Jaswantlal	C. Ramchandra
1954	Jagriti (Filmfare Award for Best Film)	Satyen Bose	Hemant Kumar
1954	Nagin	Nandlal Jaswantlal	Hemant Kumar (Filmfare Best Music Director Award
1954	Nastik	I. S. Johar	C. Ramchandra
1954	Shart	I. S. Johar	Hemant Kumar
1955	Munimji	Subodh Mukherjee	S. D. Burman
1955	Aab-e-Hayat	Ramanlal Desai	Sardar Malik
1955	Bhagwat Mahima		Hemant Kumar
1956	Durgesh Nandini (1956 film)	Bibhuti Mitra	Hemant Kumar
1956	Ham Sab Chor Hain	I. S. Johar	O. P. Nayyar
1956	Heer	Hameed Butt	Anil Biswas
1957	Tumsa Nahin Dekha	Nasir Hussain	O. P. Nayyar
1957	Paying Guest	Subodh Mukherjee	S D Batish
1957	Champakali	Nandlal Jaswantlal	Hemant Kumar
1957	Hulare (Punjabi film)	O.P. Dutta	S D Batish
1957	Muklawa (Punjabi film)	Rajinder Sharma	S D Batish
1958	Sanskar	Chaturbhuj Doshi	Anil Biswas
1958	Sun To Le Hasina	S.P.Bakshi	S. Mohinder
1959	Khoobsurat Dhokha	Ram Prakash	S. Mohinder
1959	Maine Jeena Seekh Liya	Satish Nigam	Roshan
1960	Babar	Hemen Gupta	Roshan
1964	Dooj Ka Chand	Nitin Bose	Roshan
1965	Sassi Punnu (Punjabi film)	Shanti Prakash Bakshi	B N Bali

== Bibliography ==
- Gulzar; Govind Nihalani; Saibal Chatterjee (2003). Encyclopaedia of Hindi Cinema. Popular Prakashan. ISBN 978-81-7991-066-5.
