= National Assembly of Zimbabwe =

Lower house of the Parliament of Zimbabwe

15 other official names
- - Shona: Dare reVanodzika Mitemo yeNyika
  - Ndebele: Indlu Yabameli
  - Chewa: Nyumba Ya Malamulo
  - Chibarwe: Boka Rawanaikha Mitemo Yadziko
  - Kalanga: Lubahhe gwebaMilili beMitunhu muPhalamente
  - Koisan: Ha Ndjuu Tcuan Ana Kua Kui E
  - Nambya: Igota Lyabamilili
  - Ndau: Bandhla Revanoemese Mirawu Yenyika
  - Shangani: Nhlengeletano ya Rixaka
  - Sesotho: Sehlopano Sa Sechaba
  - Tonga: Ng’anda Yaansi Yamilawu
  - Tswana: Batsenelela Phuthego Ya Setshaba
  - Venda: Guvhangano ḽa Lushaka
  - Xhosa: Inkundla Yesizwe
- 10th Parliament of Zimbabwe
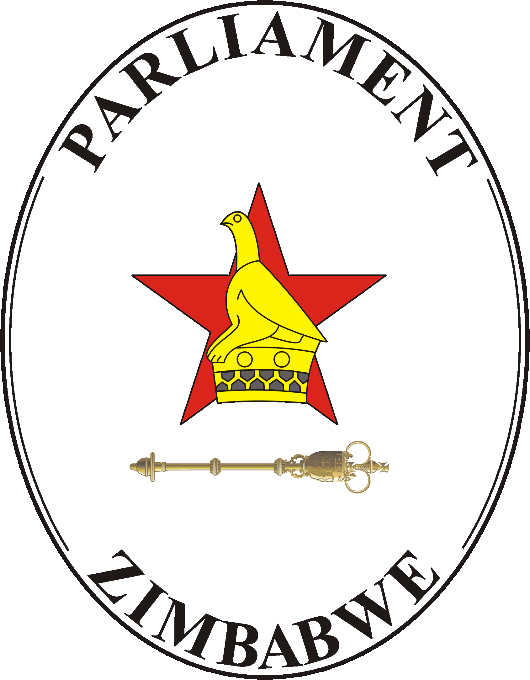

Type
- Type: Lower house of the Parliament of Zimbabwe
- Term limits: None

History
- Founded: 18 April 1980
- Preceded by: Parliament of Rhodesia
- New session started: 4 September 2023 (Note: Under the Constitution of Zimbabwe, a new term of Parliament begins on the day that the President-Elect is sworn in following a general election. Members themselves were sworn in on 7 September 2023 and the first session was opened on 3 October 2023.)

Leadership
- Speaker: Jacob Mudenda, ZANU-PF since 22 August 2013
- Deputy Speaker: Tsitsi Gezi, ZANU-PF since 11 September 2018
- Clerk: Kennedy Mugove Chokuda

Structure
- Seats: 280
- Political groups: Government (194) ZANU–PF (194) Opposition (86) CCC (86) Vacant seats (0) Vacant (0) Presiding officer (1) Speaker (1)
- Length of term: Seven years

Elections
- Voting system: Parallel voting
- First election: 14 February – 4 March 1980
- Last election: 23 August 2023
- Next election: No later than 5 August 2030
- Redistricting: Every ten years by the Zimbabwe Electoral Commission, in consultation with the President and Parliament

Meeting place
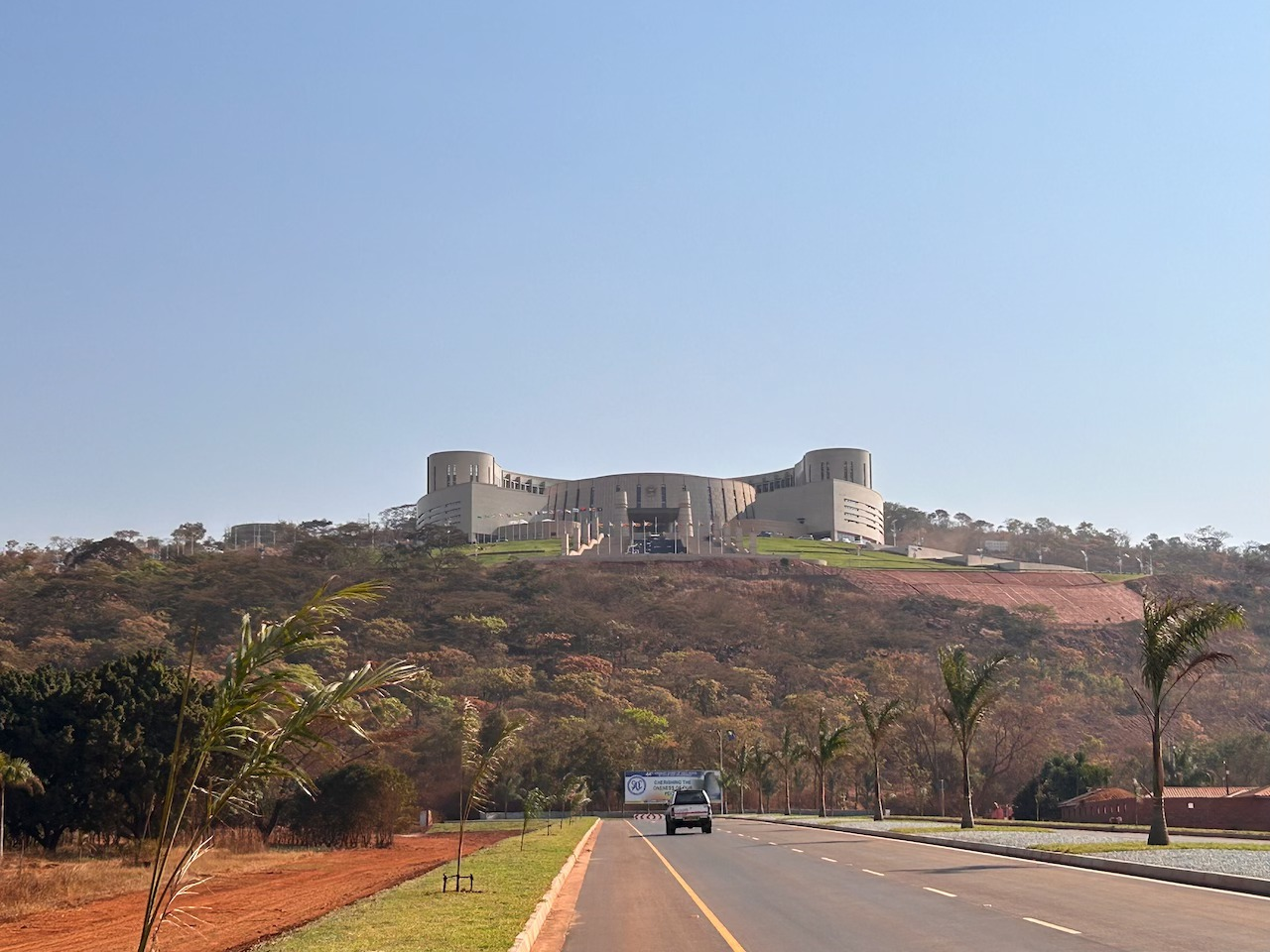
- National Assembly Chamber; New Zimbabwe Parliament Building; Mount Hampden; Zimbabwe

Website
- parlzim.gov.zw

The National Assembly of Zimbabwe, previously the House of Assembly until 2013, is the lower house of the Parliament of Zimbabwe. It was established upon Zimbabwe's independence in 1980 as one of two chambers of parliament. Between the abolition of the Senate in 1989 and its reestablishment in 2005, the House of Assembly was the sole chamber of parliament.

Since the 2023 election, the National Assembly has had 280 members. Of these, 210 are elected in single-member constituencies. 60 seats are reserved for women, and are elected by proportional representation in 10 six-seat constituencies based on the country's provinces. The last 10 seats are reserved for youth and are also elected through proportional representation in 10 one-seat constituencies based on the provinces as well.

Jacob Mudenda has been Speaker of the National Assembly since September 2013.

== History ==
Under the 1980 Constitution, 20 of the 100 seats in the House of Assembly were reserved for the country's white minority, although whites and other ethnic minorities made up only 5% of the population at the time. These seats were abolished by constitutional amendment in 1987.

This size of 100 seats was used for two elections, the 1980 election held immediately before independence and the 1985 election. The 1990 election was the first election after the abolition of the white-reserved seats, and also expanded the House of Assembly to 120 seats, a size which was retained for the 1995 and 2000 elections.

With the 2005 election, the House of Assembly was expanded to 150 members. 120 members were directly elected in single member constituencies using the plurality (or first-past-the-post) system. The President appointed twelve additional members and eight provincial governors who held reserved seats in the House. The remaining ten seats were held by traditional chiefs who were chosen by their peers. All members served five-year terms.

Following the 2008 election, the House of Assembly was expanded to 210 seats and composed entirely of elected representatives. The appointed and ex officio members were transferred to the Senate. The Seventh House of Assembly was opened on August 26, 2008. The additional system of 60 seats reserved for women was established for the 2013 election. An additional 10 seats - one for each Province - reserved for a youth quota was established for the 2023 election.

== See also ==
- History of Zimbabwe
- Legislative Branch
- List of national legislatures
- List of Zimbabwean parliamentary constituencies
- Senate of Zimbabwe - the upper chamber of Parliament
- Speaker of the National Assembly of Zimbabwe
- List of speakers of the National Assembly of Zimbabwe
