= Panna (film) =

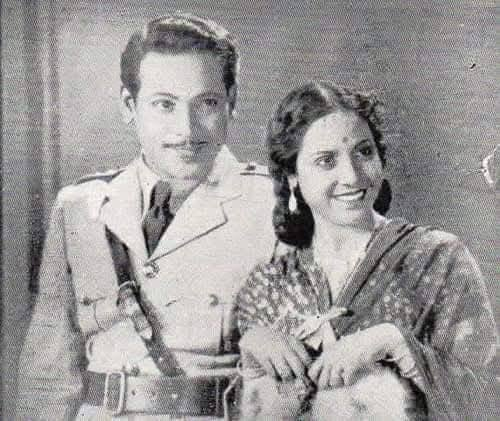
- P. Jairaj and Geeta Nizami in Panna
- Directed by: Najam Naqvi
- Produced by: Navyug Chitra
- Starring: P. Jairaj; Geeta Nizami
- Music by: Amir Ali
- Release date: 1944
- Country: India
- Language: Hindi

Panna is a 1944 Indian war drama film directed by Najam Naqvi, produced by Navyug Chitra and starring P. Jairaj and Geeta Nizami. It is described as a war propaganda film produced during World War II.

== Cast ==
- P. Jairaj as Shyam
- Geeta Nizami as Panna
- David Abraham Cheulkar as Japanese spy
- Raja Paranjape

== Music ==
Panna's music was composed by Amir Ali.

== Reception ==
Baburao Patel of filmindia called Panna "a good time killer". The film was particularly noted for a sexually suggestive scene featuring Geeta Nizami in a bathtub.

Panna became a major success at the box office. The magazine filmindia reported in 1945, "Panna is having a merry run all over the country. The success of Panna has given an impetus to Navyug business." The film's popularity also opened Geeta Nizami to public recognition.

== In popular culture ==
- The film is referenced in Abhimanyu Anat's book Slices From A Life.
