= Jevan Maseko =

Zimbabwean politician and military officer

Jevan Maseko (1 January 1943 – 20 May 2013) was a Zimbabwean military officer, the Governor of Matabeleland North Province, and the Ambassador to Algeria, Russia and Cuba.

== Death ==
Maseko died of diabetes and a kidney failure on 20 May 2013.
