= Christine Kaseba =

First Lady of Zambia from 2011 to 2014

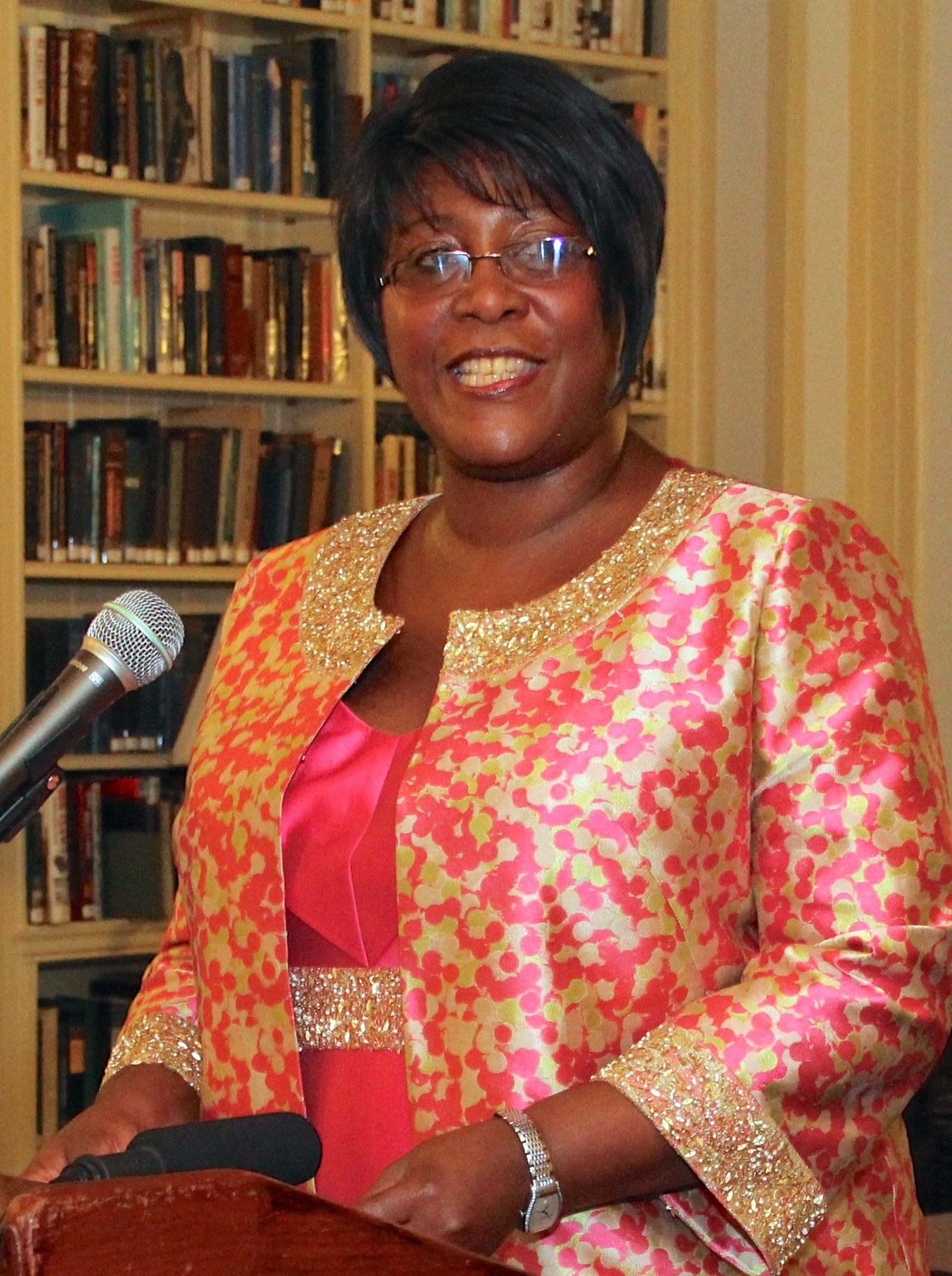
- First Lady Kaseba in New York City in 21 September 2014

5th First Lady of Zambia
- In role September 23, 2011 – October 28, 2014
- President: Michael Sata
- Preceded by: Thandiwe Banda
- Succeeded by: Charlotte Scott

Zambian Ambassador to France
- Incumbent
- Assumed office April 16, 2018

WHO goodwill ambassador for doctors against gender violence
- In office 2012–2014

Personal details
- Born: 1959 (age 66–67)
- Party: Patriotic Front
- Spouse: Michael Sata
- Education: University of Zambia

Christine Kaseba is a Zambian physician, surgeon and politician who served as the First Lady of Zambia from September 2011 until her husband's death in October 2014. She is the widow of former President Michael Sata, who died in office on October 28, 2014. Kaseba made an unsuccessful bid for President of Zambia in the January 2015 special presidential election to succeed her husband. She was appointed Zambian Ambassador to France on April 16, 2018.

== Biography ==
Kaseba was the second wife of Michael Sata, the country's president from 2011 to 2014. Christine Kaseba and Michael Sata had eight children together. Prior to marrying Kaseba, Sata had been married to his first wife, Margaret Manda.

Kaseba is a long-time physician and surgeon, specializing in gynecology and obstetrics, at University Teaching Hospital in Lusaka. She served as the First Lady of Zambia from 2011 until the death of her husband, President Sata, on October 28, 2014. Kaseba was appointed a World Health Organization Goodwill Ambassador against gender violence from 2012 to 2014.

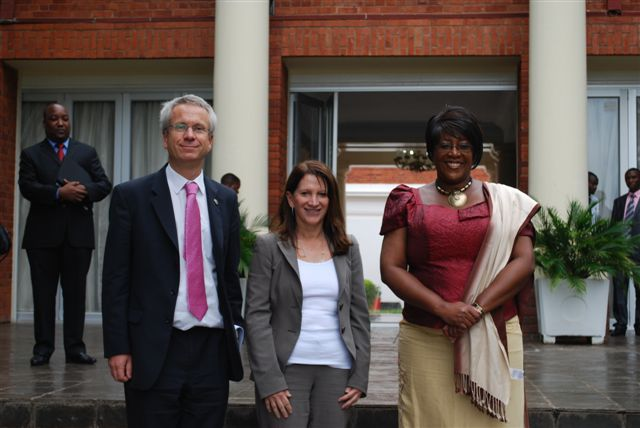
International Development Minister Lynne Featherstone meeting with the First Lady of Zambia, Dr. Christine Kaseba-Sata – who represented Zambia at the London Summit on Family Planning, 28 November 2012

While serving as first lady, she led campaigns against Breast and Cervical cancer under the Forum for African First Ladies. She also significantly contributed to the 6th Stop Cervical Cancer in Africa (SCCA) conference held on July 24, 2012 in Zambia.

Kaseba announced her candidacy for President of Zambia shortly after her husband's death. She filed her nomination papers on November 18, 2014, to contest the January 2015 presidential by-election as a member of Sata's Patriotic Front (PF). Kaseba was one of nine to compete for the PF nomination for president. However, Kaseba and the other seven PF candidates lost their party's nomination to Edgar Lungu at the party's November general conference.

In 2016, it was speculated that Christine Kaseba might be chosen as the vice presidential running mate of UPND presidential nominee, Hakainde Hichilema, for the 2016 election. Kaseba was not a member of UPND, but was seen as a potential counter to President Edgar Lungu's running mate, Inonge Wina, who is also a woman, on the presidential ticket. Former acting President Guy Scott reportedly tried to persuade Hichilema to pick Kaseba as his running mate. However, Hakainde Hichilema ultimately chose Geoffrey Bwalya Mwamba as his running mate over Kaseba, Canisius Banda and other potential picks.

Kaseba serves on the Global Task Force on Expanded Access to Cancer Care and Control in Developing Countries.
