= First Lady of Zambia =

Wife of the president of Zambia

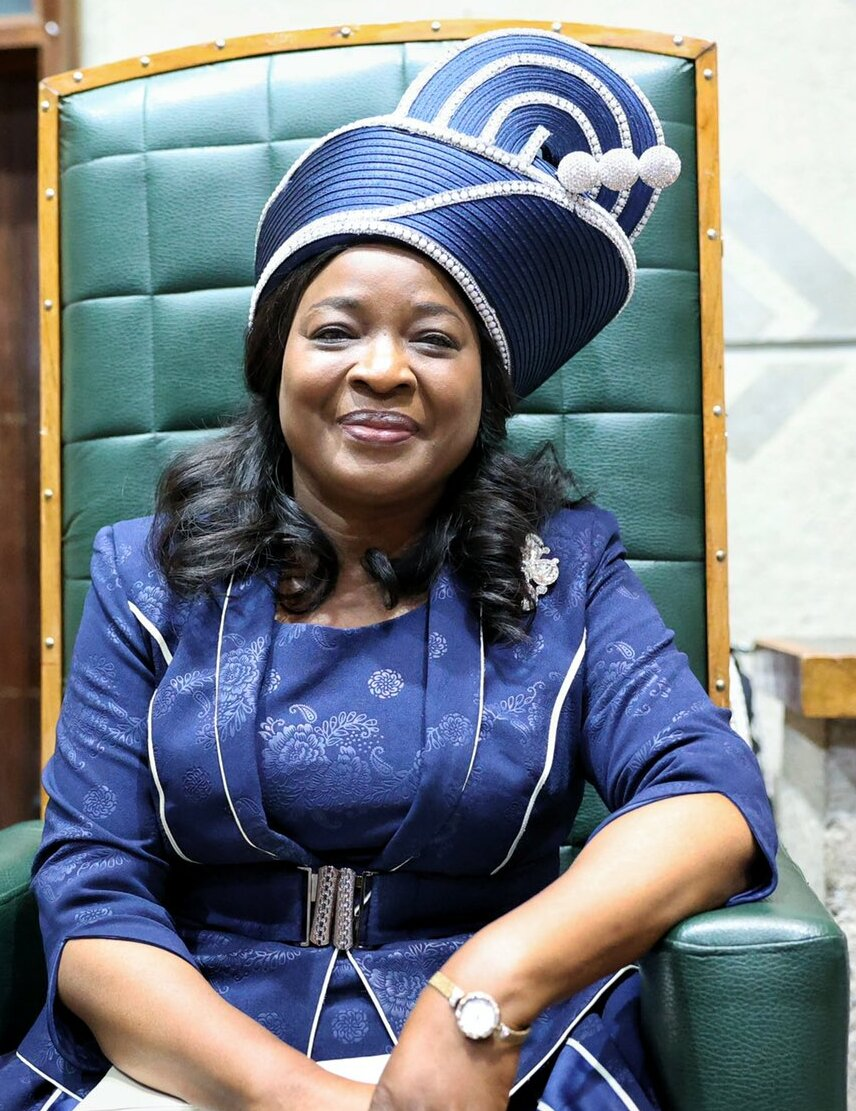
- Incumbent; Mutinta Hichilema since 24 August 2021
- Inaugural holder: Betty Kaunda
- Formation: 24 October 1964

First Lady of Zambia is the title attributed to the wife of the president of Zambia. Zambia's current first lady is Mutinta Hichilema, who has held the office since 24 August 2021.

The first lady of Zambia plays the ceremonial role of the spouse of the head of state, but has often expanded their influence beyond that. For example, the wife of the country's founding president, Betty Kaunda, was viewed as the mother of the nation and known as "Mama Kaunda." Maureen Mwanawasa used her platform as First Lady to be a strong advocate for safer sex for women, often handing out condoms at public events.

== List of first ladies ==
=== Acting First Lady ===
Denotes Acting First Lady

=== Others ===
Denotes the first lady married the president but died in office
Denotes the first lady married the president but later divorced
Denotes the first lady married the president, but the president later died
Denotes the first lady was a daughter or sister of the sitting president

=== List of officeholders ===
Pres. No.	Image	Born/Died	First Lady	Term start	Term end	President (Spouse, unless noted)
1		(1928–2013)	Betty Kaunda	24 October 1964	2 November 1991	Kenneth Kaunda m. 1946; died 2013
2		(1951–)	Vera Tembo	2 November 1991	2000 (divorced in 2001)	Frederick Chiluba m. ????; div 2001
No First Lady/office vacant; Vera Tembo is divorced in 2001 but she is out of power as first lady of Zambia in 2000s.				2000	2001	Frederick Chiluba m. ????; div 2001
-			Verocia Chiluba	2001	2 January 2002	Frederick Chiluba; Daughter
3		(1963–2024)	Maureen Mwanawasa	2 January 2002	19 August 2008	Levy Mwanawasa m. 1988; his death 2008
4		(1972–)	Thandiwe Banda	29 June 2008	23 September 2011	Rupiah Banda m. 2002; his death 2022
5		(1959–)	Christine Kaseba	23 September 2011	28 October 2014	Michael Sata m. 1994; his death 2014
-		(1963–)	Charlotte Scott	28 October 2014	26 January 2015	Guy Scott m. 1994
6		(1961–)	Esther Lungu	26 January 2015	24 August 2021	Edgar Lungu m. 1986-87
7		(1967–)	Mutinta Hichilema	24 August 2021	Incumbent	Hakainde Hichilema m. ????

== List of living First Ladies of Zambia ==
- Vera Tembo (1951-)
- Christine Kaseba (1959-)
- Esther Lungu (1961-)
- Charlotte Scott (1963-)

== List of spouses of president but not the first lady ==
Press. No.	Image	Born/Died	Name	President (Spouse, unlles noted)
2		(___?-2017)	Regina Mwanza	Frederick Chiluba m. 2002; his death 2011
4		(1941-2000)	Hope Mwansa Makulu	Rupiah Banda m. 1966; died 2000
5		(___?-___?)	Margaret Manda	Michael Sata m. ????; died ????

== See also ==
- President of Zambia
