= Maureen Mwanawasa =

First Lady of Zambia, politician (1963–2024)

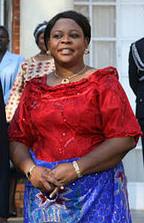
- Mwanawasa in 2007

3rd First Lady of Zambia
- In role 2 January 2002 – 19 August 2008
- President: Levy Mwanawasa
- Preceded by: Vera Tembo
- Succeeded by: Thandiwe Banda

Personal details
- Born: 28 April 1963 Kabwe, Northern Rhodesia (now Zambia)
- Died: 13 August 2024 (aged 61) Lusaka, Zambia
- Party: UPND
- Spouse: Levy Mwanawasa (m. 1987; died 2008)
- Children: Chipokota Mayamba; Matola Levy Jr. Lubona; Ntembe
- Education: University of Zambia; Edith Cowan University
- Occupation: Legal practitioner

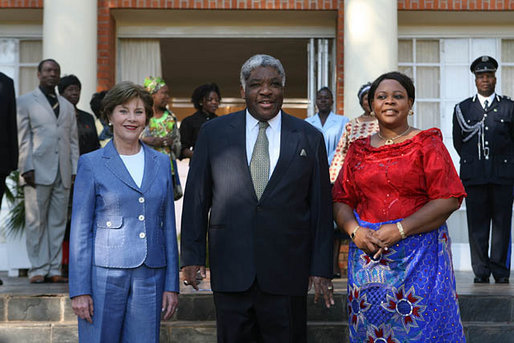
First Lady Maureen Mwanawasa with husband, President Levy Mwanawasa, and First Lady of the United States Laura Bush in June 2007.

Maureen Mwanawasa (née Kakubo; 28 April 1963 – 13 August 2024) was a Zambian legal practitioner who was first lady from 2002 to 2008. She was also a member of the Association of Women Lawyers in the United Kingdom, a serving council member of Law Association of Zambia Women’s Rights Committee, and the vice chairperson for the Habitat for Humanity, Zambia Board. She was the patron of Breakthrough Cancer Trust and the Child Care & Adoption Society of Zambia.

== Biography ==
Maureen Kakubo Mwanawasa was born in Kabwe, Northern Rhodesia (now Zambia), on 28 April 1963, to Jeniya Lupumpaula Chilunga Kakubo and Lupumpaula Buluwayo Kakubo. She was the eighth born in a family of 10 children (including a set of twins), 6 boys and 4 girls.

She started her school in 1970 at the age of seven at Raphael Kombe Primary School in Chimanimani Township in Kabwe. In 1976 she was accepted to go to St. Mary's Secondary School in Maramba, Livingstone, Southern Province where she did her secondary school form 1 to form 5 which she completed in 1981. Mwanawasa was an active member is FOMAGA which is an alumni Association of St. Mary's in Livingstone.

Mwanawasa met her future husband, Levy Mwanawasa in Kabwe where they went on to get married on 7 May 1987. The couple have 4 children together, 3 girls and 1 boy.

She campaigned with her husband during his 2001 elections when running for the presidency of Zambia and won the elections held on 27 December 2001 and took office on 2 January 2002.

As early as 2006, Mwanawasa was seen as a potential candidate for president of the country, but following her husband's death she did not file as a potential candidate to represent her husband's party in the election. She, however, did suddenly clash against Michael Sata of the Patriotic Front when he came to pay respects to her at her husband's funeral, resulting in Sata being forced off the premises.

Mwanawasa was the past president of the Organisation of African First Ladies against HIV/AIDS and founder of the Maureen Mwanawasa Community Initiative (MMCI) in 2002. She was also the joint owner of Mwanawasa & Company, her husband's law firm, until he entered into politics and left his private practice.

She was awarded the International Hope Award by World Vision in 2006.

Mwanawasa was a Jehovah's Witness, but in 2001 she was excommunicated for being actively involved in politics. She was a Baptist Christian.

== Political career ==
In May 2016, Mwanawasa announced her candidacy for mayor of Lusaka District under the sponsorship of the United Party for National Development (UPND) in the 2016 general election held on 11 August 2016. Mwanawasa, who filed her nomination papers on 30 May 2016, received the endorsements of former vice president Guy Scott, as well as former MPs Sylvia Masebo and Obvious Mwaliteta. She pledged to curb the city's cholera outbreaks and water shortages if elected. Mwanawasa also promised to clean up the city's chronic garbage and litter problems by creating a new garbage collection system, saying "Everywhere you look around in Lusaka, there is garbage and this should change starting this week when we form government. There is no way our beautiful city can be floating on garbage...The levels of indiscriminate disposal of garbage in Lusaka city are alarming. When you are on the streets of Lusaka, you look west you see garbage, you look east you see garbage, you look north, it’s garbage, you look south it’s garbage. This is unacceptable. Would you like it if your house was filled with garbage and there is bad odour all around? The answer is no. We need to maintain our hygiene and stay healthy and fit. It is our duty to keep our city clean not only for us, but also for the people visiting our city and also for the future generations."

Mwanawasa placed second in the Lusaka mayoral election on 11 August, losing to the Patriotic Front (PF) candidate, Wilson Kalumba. Kalumba won the election with 270,161 votes, while Mwanawasa came in second place with 150,807 votes.

== Personal life and death ==
Maureen Mwanawasa was the widow of former president Levy Mwanawasa, who died in office in 2008, and was a mother of four including Chipokota Mwanawasa, a lawyer and businesswoman.

Mwanawasa died of a short illness at Maina Soko Medical Centre in Lusaka Zambia, on 13 August 2024, at the age of 61.
