= Esther Lungu =

First Lady of Zambia from 2015 to 2021 (born 1957)

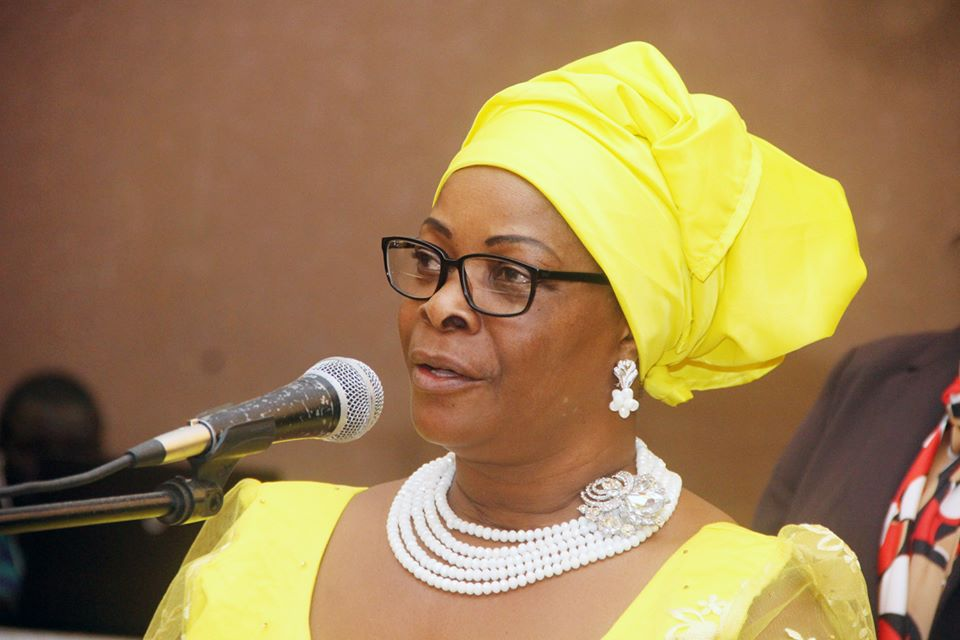

6th First Lady of Zambia
- In role 25 January 2015 – 24 August 2021
- President: Edgar Lungu
- Preceded by: Charlotte Scott
- Succeeded by: Mutinta Hichilema

Personal details
- Born: Esther Phiri; 2 June 1957 (age 69)
- Party: Patriotic Front
- Spouse: Edgar Lungu (m. 1986; died 2025)
- Children: 6

Esther Nyawa Lungu (born 2 June 1957) is a Zambian public figure who served as the First Lady from 25 January 2015 to 24 August 2021. She is the widow of the former Zambian president Edgar Lungu.

While she was raised Catholic, Esther Lungu and her husband are currently practicing Baptists. In 2015, she travelled to the United States to participate in a series of events, including the First Ladies' and women's summits at the George W. Bush Institute in Dallas, Texas, and the United Nations in New York City. At the Invest in Women conference in Dallas, Esther Nyawa Lungu was a distinguished panelist, with the session being moderated by Cherie Blair.

During her tenure as the First Lady of Zambia, Esther Lungu was an advocate against child marriage. In December 2015, she established the Esther Lungu Foundation, where she serves as the chairman and mentor. The foundation's primary objective is to empower women and children in Zambia. In May 2024, Esther Lungu was arrested for fraud.

== Early life ==
Esther Phiri was born on 2 June 1957 to Agnes and Island Phiri, who were originally from the country's Eastern Province. She was raised Catholic, but she and her husband are now practicing Baptists. She said, "When we first met, Edgar had his UCZ hymn books while I had my Catholic catechism books, until we eventually found common ground in the Baptist faith."

== State visits ==
Edgar Lungu became a junior minister in the Vice President's Office in 2011, Minister of Home Affairs on 9 July 2012 and Defence minister on 24 December 2013 in the Patriotic Front government. Lungu was adopted as the candidate for the Patriotic Front during the January 2015 presidential by-election, following Michael Sata's death. He narrowly defeated the opposition candidate and was sworn-in as the President of Zambia on 25 January 2015 and his wife Esther became the First Lady of Zambia.

Being the First Lady, Esther was part of many state visits along with her husband, the President. During 2015, she attended a series of meetings in the United States of America and she was invited by the George W. Bush Institute to participate in first lady conference and discuss topics of women's empowerment, health and technology. She was invited by the health minister of the Kingdom of Saudi Arabia and by Princess Latifa Bint Abulazis Al Saud to discuss support for women and child welfare programmes in Zambia. As a part of her continual humanitarian work, she launched Esther Lungu Foundation in December 2015.

== Social activities ==
Lungu launched a trust fund which seeks to reduce vulnerability of the underprivileged persons using gender sensitive, participatory and environmentally sustainable approaches to improve their livelihoods. The Esther Lungu Foundation Trust (ELFT) aims to leverage its position to address issues relating to economic empowerment, maternity, children, neo-natal health, and water sanitation.

The ELFT, with the Muslim Social and Welfare Trust, installed hand pumps with boreholes in many places in Chongwe District. The district was facing acute water shortage as the reserves in Chongwe River reduced. It started identifying vulnerable families, where empowering women might eradicate poverty in the country. It began work with the ministries of Community Development and General Education to enrol schoolchildren.

Lungu suggested hand soap can reduce one out of every three cases of childhood diarrhea. She has advocated for bettering the lives of Zambia's older women, and donated 30,000K to six women's associations in Chilanga. She congratulated her husband for choosing a woman as his running mate, a first in her country. Some journalists see her social work as a campaign for her husband in upcoming presidential elections, which the Patriotic Front denies.

The Special Olympics conferred on Lungu the title of 50th Anniversary Ambassador for the African Region, in September 2017. It was the 50th anniversary of the Special Olympics Leadership Academy which was hosted by Zambia at the Olympic Youth Development Centre.
