= Vera Tembo =

Former First Lady of Zambia

2nd First Lady of Zambia
- In role November 2, 1991 – September 25, 2001
- President: Frederick Chiluba
- Preceded by: Betty Kaunda
- Succeeded by: Maureen Mwanawasa

Member of the National Assembly
- In office 2006–2011
- Succeeded by: Victoria Kalima
- Constituency: Kasenengwa

Personal details
- Born: July 25, 1953 (age 72)
- Party: MMD
- Spouse: Frederick Chiluba (1967–2000; divorced)
- Children: Nine

Vera Tembo (born July 25, 1953) is a Zambian politician and member of the Movement for Multi-Party Democracy (MMD). She served as the First Lady of Zambia from 1991 until her separation from her former husband, President Frederick Chiluba, in 2001.

In 2006, she made her political comeback by being elected to the National Assembly of Zambia from Kasenengwa constituency.

== Biography ==
Tembo was married to Frederick Chiluba, with whom she had nine children, for thirty-three years, until he announced their separation in 2000. Chiluba became President of Zambia in 1991, making Tembo the country's First Lady from 1991 until their divorce. Tembo left the State House, the presidential residence, shortly after Chiluba's announcement and moved in with family in Ndola. Their divorce became final on September 25, 2001, when an annulment was granted by a local court in Ndola after thirty-three years of marriage.

Vera Tembo described the circumstances of her separation and divorce from Chiluba as "humiliating." She campaigned during the 2001 general election by urging Zambian women to vote in the election. She also signaled her intention to enter politics. Chiluba left office in December 2001 after failing to win support for a third presidential term, which was banned by the country's Constitution. Former President Frederick Chiluba married his girlfriend, Regina Mwanza, in 2002, a few months after his divorce from Tembo was finalized.

By early 2002, Zambian newspapers reported that Tembo was living in poverty after Chiluba had allegedly frozen her bank account. She filed a $2.5 billion U.S. dollar lawsuit against Chiluba as part of the divorce settlement. The Zambian government offered Tembo financial assistance in May 2002 after she listed her personal possessions in an auction.

In 2006, Tembo ran for the Kasenengwa constituency seat in the National Assembly of Zambia as a Movement for Multi-Party Democracy (MMD) candidate. She won the election and became the first woman to represent Kasenengwa, a largely rural seat in Eastern Province, in the National Assembly. In October 2006, shortly after the election, President Levy Mwanawasa appointed Tembo as Deputy Minister of Tourism, Environment and Natural Resources in his cabinet.

Vera Tembo, who was re-appointed Deputy Minister by Mwanawasa's successor, President Rupiah Banda, held the ministry portfolio from 2006 until 2011, when she left the National Assembly. In 2010, Tembo oversaw the relocation of black rhinoceroses to North Luangwa National Park and other natural areas of Zambia, citing the program as a boost to both the country's environment and the tourism industry.

In March 2015, Vera Tembo announced that she had become a Christian pastor and had founded a new church called the Healing International Ministry.
