= Ritual killings in Zambia =

The people of Chingola, Zambia, fought running battles with residents who were rioting over ritual killings, in 2020 January. Chingola town was hit with deaths associated with ritual killings with the recent one happening on December 30, 2019, in which six members of the same family were attacked with machetes, and others died from this incident.

Zambia has been left wondering what is really happening to the nation, known to hold strong Christian morals from since the country was declared a Christian nation by the second republican president Fredrick Chiluba. The residents took matters into their own hands and broke into shops owned by businessmen alleged to have been behind the ritual killings in Chingola. The irate residents started the riots as early as 08:30 hours, blocking highway roads with burning tyres and trees to show frustration.

For weeks, serial killers penetrated copperbelt killing innocent people. Using an unknown powder to make people sleep then cut their private parts. However some people accused members of parliament and the opposition leader Hakainde Hichilema.

== Aftermath ==
After this incident, 43 people had been killed and another 23 injured in a wave of lynch mob attacks against those who were suspected of being involved in toxic attacks on households.

== Controversy ==
Copperbelt Police Commissioner Charity Katanga later stated the suspected ‘ritual killers’ were actually turning into cats, making it so easy to actually allude the police and this made it so hard for them to do the job of maintaining law and order. However the incident was shocking and people continued to live in fear, locking doors and opting to guarding themselves. Police were on alert and quick to respond on each call received from the public, to control ground confusion. The police believed there were no ritual murders, but just people with a motive to harm others. This later led to the arresting of a prominent Zambian preacher Bishop Kazhila for allegedly been the man behind escalating these events.

Due to unreliable sources and already present domestic issues, Various rumors were spread on social media platforms that further made the motives behind the killings even murkier.
