= Jito Kayumba =

Special Assistant to President Hichilema

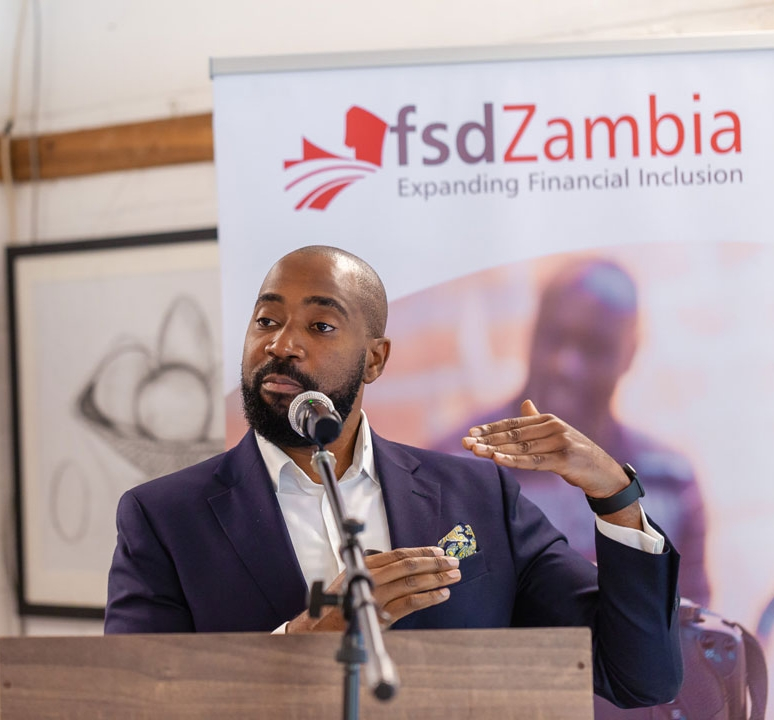
- Kayumba in 2021

Special Assistant and Advisor to the President
- Incumbent
- Assumed office 15 September 2021
- President: Hakainde Hichilema

Personal details
- Born: Lusaka, Zambia
- Education: African Leadership University School of Business, Concordia University

Jito Kayumba is an investment professional and business strategist. He is currently a Special Assistant and advisor to President Hakainde Hichilema for Finance and Investment since September 2021. Previously, he served as a partner at Kukula Capital, a venture capital firm in Zambia. In addition to his advisory position, Kayumba is a prolific content creator, known for producing short videos that aim to highlight the achievements of the Hichilema administration.

Jito Kayumba has sat on the boards of Airtel Zambia Plc, Zambian Breweries Plc, Famous Brands Zambia, iSchool Zambia, among others.

== Career and education ==
Jito Kayumba did his bachelors in Political Science in Canada and went on to work in boutique investment firm before moving back to Zambia in 2009. He then began work in an advisory firm as an associate dealing in market entry, investments, mergers and acquisitions, in the mining and energy sector. He then joined Kukula Capital in 2012 where he served as partner until his government appointment in September 2021.

While at Kukula, he went on to do a Masters in Business Administration and has done numerous programs in leadership and investment.

Prior to joining the Hichilema administration, Kayumba served on different Zambian boards including Airtel and Zambian Breweries Ltd.
