= Charlotte Harland Scott =

Former Interim First Lady of Zambia (born 1963)

Charlotte Scott
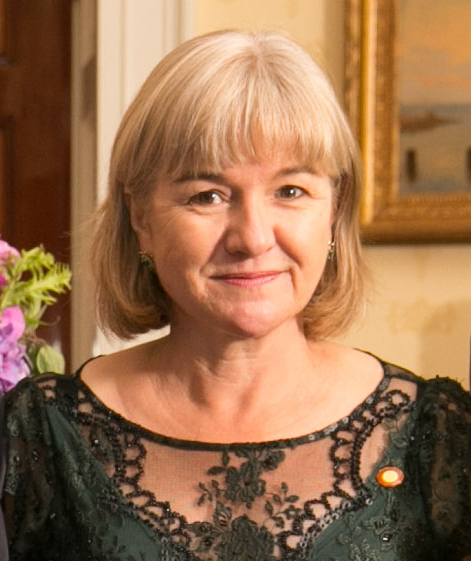
- Scott at the White House in 2014

Acting First Lady of Zambia
- In role 28 October 2014 – 26 January 2015
- President: Guy Scott
- Preceded by: Christine Kaseba
- Succeeded by: Esther Lungu

Second Lady of Zambia
- In role 23 September 2011 – 28 October 2014
- Vice President: Guy Scott
- Preceded by: Irene Kunda
- Succeeded by: Max Lubinda Nalumango (as Second Gentleman, 2021)

Personal details
- Born: Charlotte Harland; 13 November 1963 (age 62) Blackheath, London, England
- Party: UPND (since 2016); PF (former)
- Spouse: Guy Scott (m. 1994; died 2026)
- Education: University of Bath (PhD); University of Reading (M.A.); University of Oxford (B.A.)
- Occupation: International development specialist

Charlotte Harland Scott (born 13 November 1963) is a British-born Zambian economic and social development specialist who served as the First Lady of Zambia from October 2014 to January 2015 during the tenure of her husband, interim President Guy Scott. She had previously served as the Chief of Social Policy and Economic Analysis, Planning Monitoring and Evaluation for UNICEF Zambia from 2007 until 2012. In 2016, Scott contested the Lusaka Central seat in the National Assembly during the general election.

== Early life and education ==
Scott, the second of three daughters, was born Charlotte Harland to Robin and Janet Harland in Blackheath, London, on 13 November 1963. She was brought up in nearby Greenwich in southeast London. She is a member of the Church of England.

Scott completed her primary and secondary schooling in London, attending Westminster School for sixth form. She received her Bachelor of Arts in psychology and development studies from the University of Oxford in 1986. She then obtained a Master of Arts in rural development at the University of Reading in 1987. Scott later completed her PhD from the University of Bath in 2007.

== Personal life ==
In 1989, Scott was hired by a British international humanitarian organisation who asked her to work in Zambia. She arrived in Zambia in July 1989 at the age of 26 and was placed in the northeast town of Mpika by her employer. By 1991, she was living in the village of Chitulika, the home of future President Michael Sata's father. Scott met her future husband, Guy Scott, during the run-up to the 1991 Zambian general election. He was working on Michael Sata's election campaign for the Mpika constituency seat at the time of their meeting. She and Sata were mutual acquaintances at that time since Mpika was his hometown and her development project was overseen by the government Ministry of State, which was headed by Sata.

Charlotte and Guy Scott married in 1994 at a wedding held at the Lusaka Civic Centre with the reception at their home in State Lodge. Scott died in July 2026.

== Career ==
Professionally, Scott has worked in the fields of economic development policy, social development policy and NGOs for more than twenty years. She headed the team which created and launched the Zambian Public Welfare Assistance Scheme, a social protection and poverty alleviation government program. It was an early forerunner of the present-day conditional cash transfers (also called social cash transfers), which makes welfare programs conditional based upon the receivers' actions. In 2014, two years after Scott left the program, her Zambian cash transfer program was named UNICEF's best global research program.

Scott served as the Chief of Social Policy and Economic Analysis, Planning, Monitoring & Evaluation for UNICEF's Zambian branch for five years from 2007 until 2012. She worked in nearly every district in Zambia in that position. She stepped down for her position at UNICEF in 2011 when her husband was appointed Vice-President of Zambia by President Sata. United Nations regulations required that employees whose spouses attain high political office either step down from their job or taking another position with the United Nations in another country. She chose to leave her post.

By 2013, Scott had been appointed a Visiting Fellow of the Institute of Development Studies (IDS) at the University of Sussex. She has publicly spoken out on a variety of societal issues affecting Zambia, including children's rights, gender discrimination, violence against women, and women's access to education.

Sata died in office on 28 October 2014. Vice-President Guy Scott succeeded Sata as the acting President of Zambia until a by-election could be held 90 days after Sata's death. The events made Charlotte Scott the First Lady of Zambia during this time. The couple became the country's first white President and First Lady. Despite their new positions, the Scotts did not move into Government House, the residence of the country's president. Guy Scott was barred by law from running for the remainder of Sata's unexpired presidential term because the Constitution of Zambia banned presidential candidates whose parents were not born in Zambia. His parents had immigrated to present-day Zambia from England and Scotland in the United Kingdom. Charlotte Scott left the position of First Lady on 26 January 2015 and was succeeded by Esther Lungu.

In 2016, Guy Scott decided would not seek re-election to his Lusaka Central seat in Parliament in the August general election. Charlotte Scott applied to run for her husband's seat and was endorsed by the United Party for National Development (UPND) as the party's official nominee. Scott and her main opponent, the PF's Margaret Mwanakatwe, were considered the front-runners for Lusaka Central during the election out of the five candidates for the seat. On 18 July 2016, Scott and her supporters were attacked while campaigning in the Town Centre Market in Lusaka. The attackers, who used stones and screwdrivers to chase Scott and her staff from the market, were supporters of the rival party, the Patriotic Front (PF), according to news reports. Scott and her staff escaped unharmed, but their Toyota Land Cruiser suffered major damage during the attack. She told a newspaper, "Our team did not retaliate. Why can't we campaign in peace? This is completely unacceptable!" The PF candidate, Margaret Mwanakatwe, defeated Scott in the general election on 11 August 2016. In line with the provisions of the constitution, Charlotte Scott petitioned the validity of the election. On 24 November 2016, the High Court of Zambia nullified the election of Mwanakatwe, on grounds of violence, corruption, mis-use of Government resources, discrimination / racism, and the actions of the Zambia Police in preventing Dr Scott from campaigning freely. The Constitutional Court subsequently ruled that Mwanakatwe maintains the seat pending appeal, but had not set a date for that appeal to be heard.
