= Mutinta Hichilema =

First Lady of Zambia

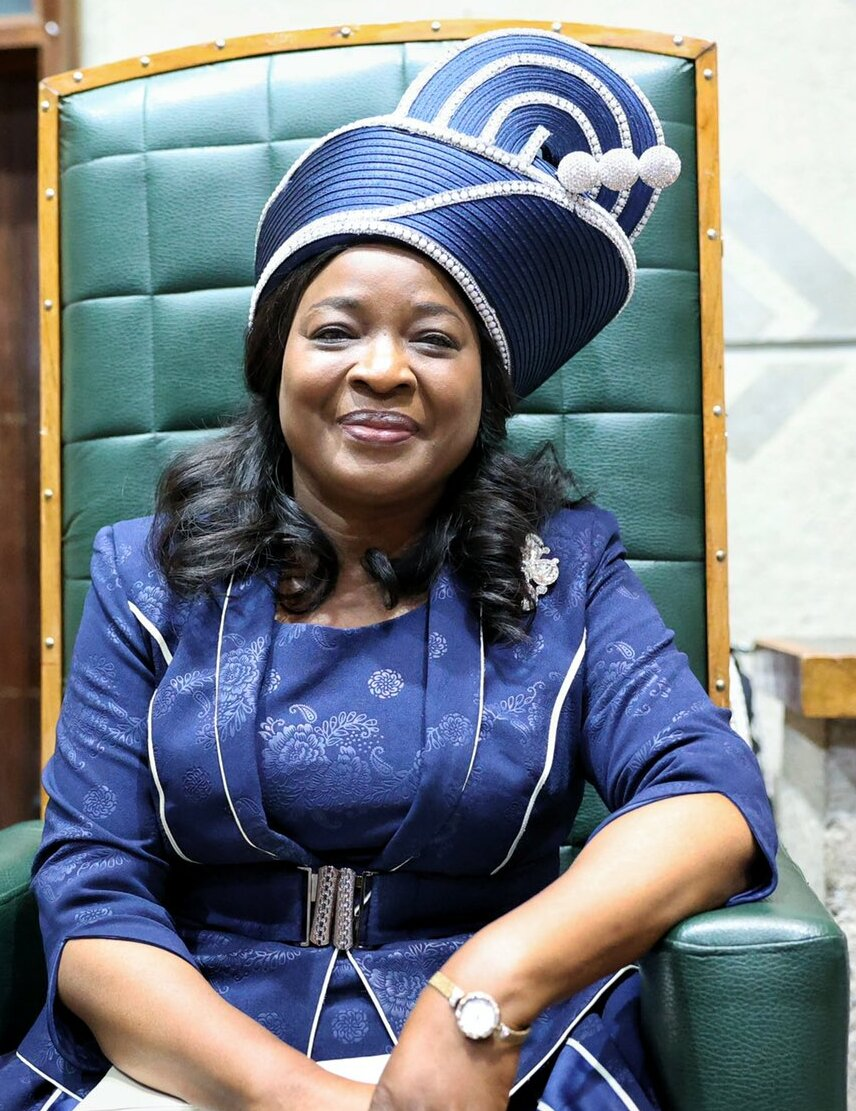
- Mutinta Hichilema in 2022

7th First Lady of Zambia
- Assumed role 24 August 2021
- President: Hakainde Hichilema
- Preceded by: Esther Lungu

Personal details
- Born: 7 May 1967 (age 59) Shibuyunji, Central Province, Zambia
- Party: United Party for National Development
- Spouse: Hakainde Hichilema (m. 1988)
- Children: 3

Mutinta Hichilema (born 7 May 1967) is the first lady of Zambia, having assumed the role after her husband, Hakainde Hichilema, was elected as president of Zambia in August 2021. She is committed to humanitarian causes and her active involvement in community development programs across Zambia.

== Life ==
Hichilema was born in Shibuyunji. She is a devout member of the Seventh-day Adventist Church. She is an advocate for religious tolerance and interfaith harmony in Zambia. Her work has focused on promoting unity and understanding among people of different faiths, and she has been involved in initiatives to promote social cohesion and national development.
