= Betty Kaunda =

Former First Lady of Zambia (1928–2013)

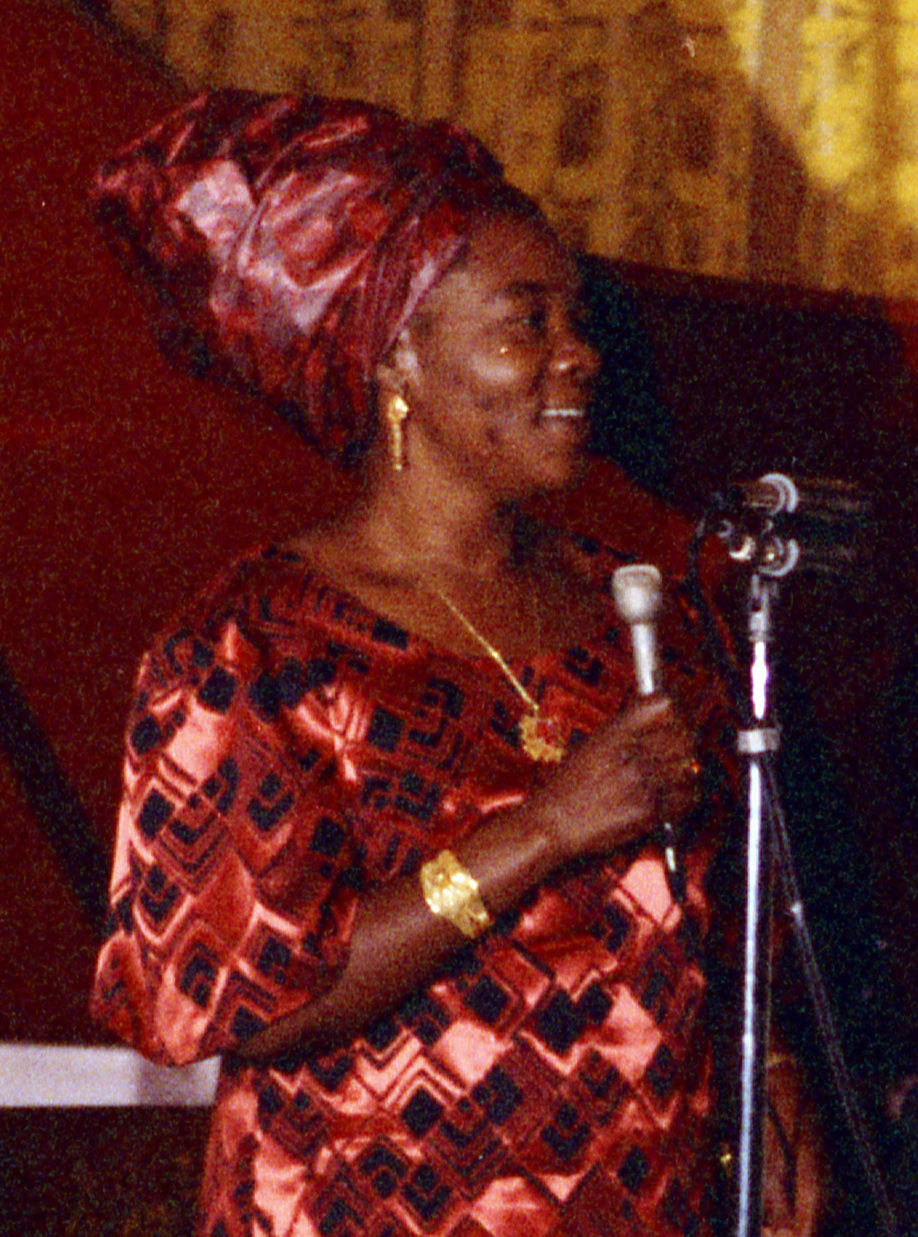
- Kaunda in 1975

1st First Lady of Zambia
- In role 24 October 1964 – 2 November 1991
- President: Kenneth Kaunda
- Preceded by: Position created
- Succeeded by: Vera Tembo

Personal details
- Born: Beatrice Kaweche Banda; 17 November 1928 Chinsali, Northern Rhodesia (now Zambia)
- Died: 18 September 2013 (aged 84) Harare, Zimbabwe
- Spouse: Kenneth Kaunda (m. 1946)
- Children: 8; including Tilyenji

Beatrice "Betty" Kaunda (née Kaweche Banda; 17 November 1928 – 18 September 2013) was a Zambian educator and inaugural first lady of Zambia from 1964 to 1991 as the wife of the country's first president, Kenneth Kaunda. She was known as Mama Betty Kaunda and the mother of Zambia by Zambians.

As the first lady, she was part of many diplomatic visits and matron of many organizations. As per political observers, she led a very simple life as the first lady. She authored her autobiography along with Stephen A. Mpashi in 1969. She was involved in many charitable initiatives and she received the Indira Gandhi Non-violence award from UNIP for her efforts.

== Early life ==
Betty Kaunda was born on 17 November 1928 to Kaweche Banda and Milika Sakala Banda at Mpika. She had her education at Mbereshi Girls and later underwent training at Mindolo Ecumenical Foundation’s Women’s programme. She worked as a teacher in Mufulira.

She married Kenneth Kaunda in 1946, who was involved in the independence movement and later went on to become the first president of independent Zambia. In his own words in his book Letter to My Children, Kaunda was the strength behind him all through their 67 years of marriage as she took care of the children in his absence. The colonial administration sent Kaunda to jail and she took to charcoal burning to feed the family. She is believed to have received multiple threats and coercions during those days, but she never gave up to the threats. In her own words, "The colonial administrators threatened to send us back to the villages after our husbands were arrested, but we refused". She mentioned that the letters she received from her husband during those days were source of strength to her and motivation too. He instructed her not to move from their house in Chilenje.

== First Lady of Zambia ==
She was the first lady of Zambia from October 1964 to November 1991. As the first lady, she was part of many diplomatic visits and matron of many organizations. As per political observers, she led a very simple life even after becoming the first lady and never gave in to the luxuries of the position. She authored her autobiography along with Stephen A. Mpashi and the book was brought out during 1969. She wore traditional chitenge outfits advising her fellow women to wear decent dress and to avoid mimicking outfits from foreign countries. She also advised young ladies who were ready for marriage to conserve the African tradition (Zambian culture). When invited to a kitchen party by giving them a present of the mbabula, broom, chitenge as a true woman as this is how she started her life.

Kenneth Kaunda and Betty were considered frontrunners in AIDS eradication in the country. Many scholars appreciated them for leading the way to allow them to be tested for HIV/AIDS and publish the results. She maintained a calm stature during later struggles when her husband was imprisoned during the 1990s. Betty had been active in opposing the encouragement of political parties to offer beer to youths, reflecting thoughts of her husband who threatened to quit presidency on account of excessive drinking prevalent in the society. She was involved in collecting donations during a copper mine accident, which left several killed. She received the Indira Gandhi Non-violence award from UNIP for her efforts on non-violence and peace missions.

== Later years ==
Kaunda was considered the national mother by Zambian citizens, who often referred to her by the honorific nickname, Mama Betty Kaunda. She suffered from diabetes for many years.

Betty Kaunda died in the early hours of 18 September 2013, aged 84 in Harare, Zimbabwe, while visiting her daughter, Kaunda Banda. Kaunda and the other family members left for Harare to receive her body. She was survived by her husband, eight children, 30 grandchildren and eleven great grandchildren.

Kaunda was given state funeral as the former first lady of Zambia. She followed Christianity (for she was an Anglican, despite having a Presbyterian husband belonging to the United Church of Zambia) and her final rites were performed based on Christian practices. Her funeral, held at the Cathedral of Holy Cross in Lusaka on 27 September 2013, was attended by diplomats from other countries, state officials and thousands of Zambians. The government declared three days of national mourning, while television and radio stations played hymns dedicated to her during the morning and evening. Her burial was planned initially for Lubwa Mission, but was moved to the capital Lusaka on account of waning health of Kaunda.
