= Levy Mwanawasa =

3rd president of Zambia (1948–2008)

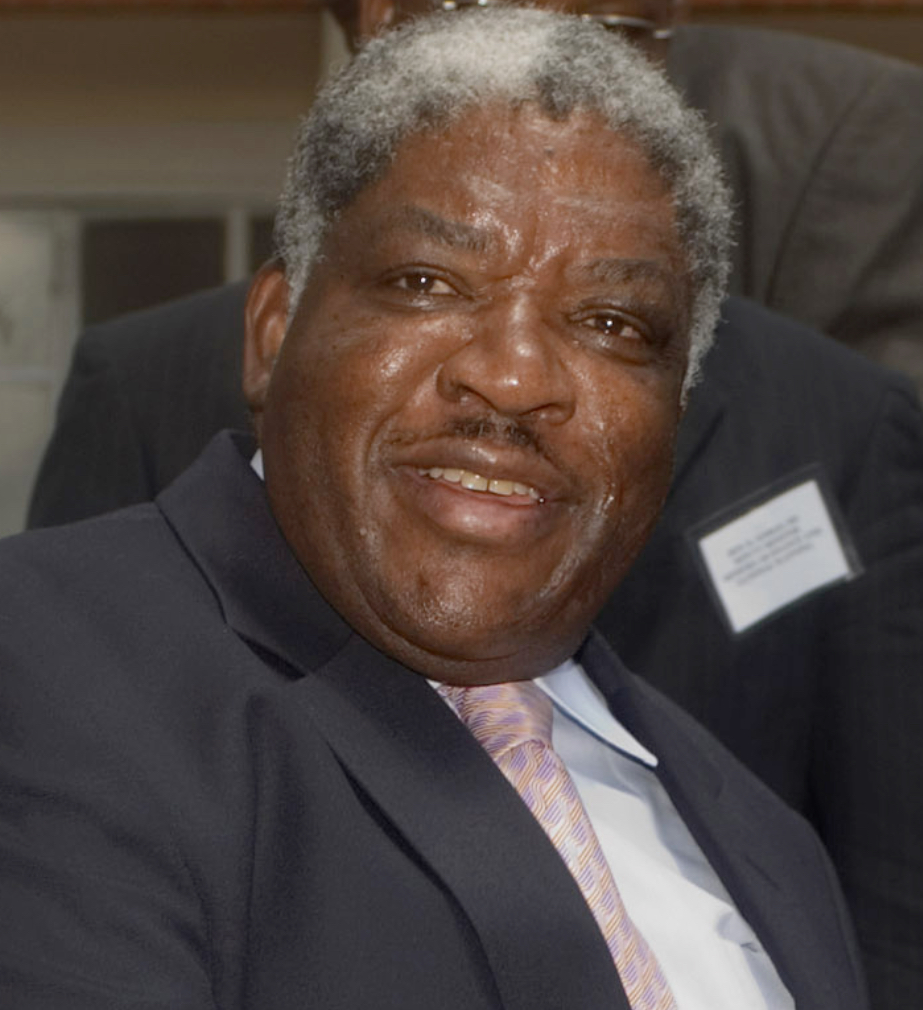
- Mwanawasa in 2006

3rd President of Zambia
- In office 2 January 2002 – 19 August 2008
- Vice President: Enoch Kavindele; Nevers Mumba; Lupando Mwape; Rupiah Banda
- Preceded by: Frederick Chiluba
- Succeeded by: Rupiah Banda

4th Vice-President of Zambia
- In office 7 November 1991 – 3 July 1994
- President: Frederick Chiluba
- Preceded by: Office restored
- Succeeded by: Godfrey Miyanda

Personal details
- Born: 3 September 1948 Mufulira, Loangwa, Northern Rhodesia (now Zambia)
- Died: 19 August 2008 (aged 59) Clamart, France
- Cause of death: Stroke
- Resting place: Embassy Park; 15.421884°S 28.309314°E
- Party: MMD
- Spouse: Maureen Mwanawasa
- Children: 7
- Profession: Lawyer

Levy Patrick Mwanawasa (3 September 1948 – 19 August 2008) was a Zambian politician who served as the third president of Zambia. He served as president from January 2002 until his death in August 2008. Mwanawasa is credited with having initiated a campaign to rid the corruption situation in Zambia during his term. Prior to Mwanawasa's election, he served as the fourth vice-president of Zambia from November 1991 to July 1994, whilst an elected Member of Parliament of Chifubu Constituency.

== Early life and legal career ==
Mr. Mwanawasa was born in Mufulira, Northern Rhodesia, as the second of 10 children. He held a law degree from the University of Zambia. He worked in private law firms from 1974 until 1978 when he formed his own firm: Mwanawasa & Company. In 1985, Mwanawasa served as Solicitor General in the Zambian government but he went back to private practice in 1986.

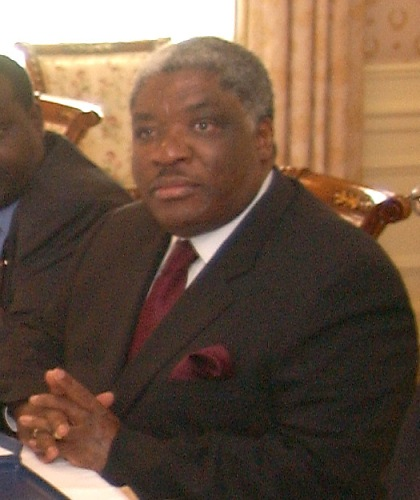
Levy Patrick Mwanawasa

In 1989, he led the legal defence team for Lt. Gen Christon Tembo, who was accused by the Kenneth Kaunda government of conspiracy to overthrow the government, which was judged as an act of treason worthy of the death penalty; Tembo won the case against the state, and Mwanawasa's fame among the anti-Kaunda opposition grew. After Frederick Chiluba was elected as president, he appointed Mwanawasa as vice-president in November 1991. Mwanawasa left his firm in March 1992.

== Accident ==
Before his party's convention in 1990, Mwanawasa was widely tipped to become the president of the Movement for Multiparty Democracy (MMD), but he declined the overture, citing his young age and inexperience. He opted instead to stand as a member of parliament for Chifubu and won with an overwhelming majority of the popular vote.

On 8 December 1991 Mwanawasa was involved in a serious traffic accident in which his aide died on the spot. He suffered multiple body injuries and was flown to Johannesburg, South Africa for medical treatment. He remained hospitalised for three months. A lasting effect of the accident was his noticeably slurred speech. A commission of inquiry was set up to investigate who was responsible for the alleged assassination attempt.

== Politics ==
Mwanawasa served as vice-president until he resigned in July 1994. In 1996 he unsuccessfully challenged Chiluba for the presidency of the Movement for Multiparty Democracy. After the loss, Mwanawasa retired from politics until the 2001 election.

== 2001 election ==
In August 2001, the National Executive Committee of MMD elected Mwanawasa as its presidential candidate for the 2001 election. He won the election, held on 27 December 2001, with 29% due to Zambia's first past the post system, beating 10 other candidates including two other former vice-presidents (Godfrey Miyanda and Gen. Christon Tembo); Anderson Mazoka came in a close second with 27%, according to official results. Mwanawasa took office on 2 January 2002. However, the results of the elections were disputed by main opposition parties, including Mazoka's United Party for National Development. Some domestic and international election monitors cited serious irregularities with the campaign and election, including flawed voter registration, unequal and biased media coverage, and the MMD's improper use of state resources. In January 2002, three opposition candidates petitioned the Supreme Court to overturn Mwanawasa's victory. While the court agreed that the poll was flawed, it ruled in February 2005 that the irregularities did not affect the results and declined the petition.

== First term as president ==
In February 2002, Mwanawasa's government filed defamation charges against The Post editor Fred M'membe and opposition lawmaker Dipak Patel for an article in which M'membe quoted Patel as calling Mwanawasa a "cabbage", an apparent reference to his injuries.

However, in a move Mwanawasa described as an attempt to promote "national reconciliation", Mwanawasa appointed a number of opposition lawmakers to his cabinet in February 2003, including Patel of the FDD as Minister of Trade, Commerce, and Industry, and Sylvia Masebo of the ZRP as Local Government Minister. However, Godfrey Miyanda, himself also belonging to the opposition, opposed the move and threatened to file a lawsuit over it.

In January 2005, Mwanawasa apologised to the nation for failing to tackle Zambian poverty. About 75% of the country's population lived on less than $1 a day, the United Nations' indicator of absolute poverty.

He was elected as president of the MMD for a five-year term in 2005.

== 2006 election ==
Mwanawasa ran for a second term in the presidential election held on 28 September 2006. Michael Sata of the Patriotic Front was considered his main challenger. His re-election was confirmed on 2 October; according to official results, he received 42.98% of the vote. He was sworn in for another term on 3 October. A few days later, he named a new cabinet and appointed Rupiah Banda as vice-president.

== Policies ==
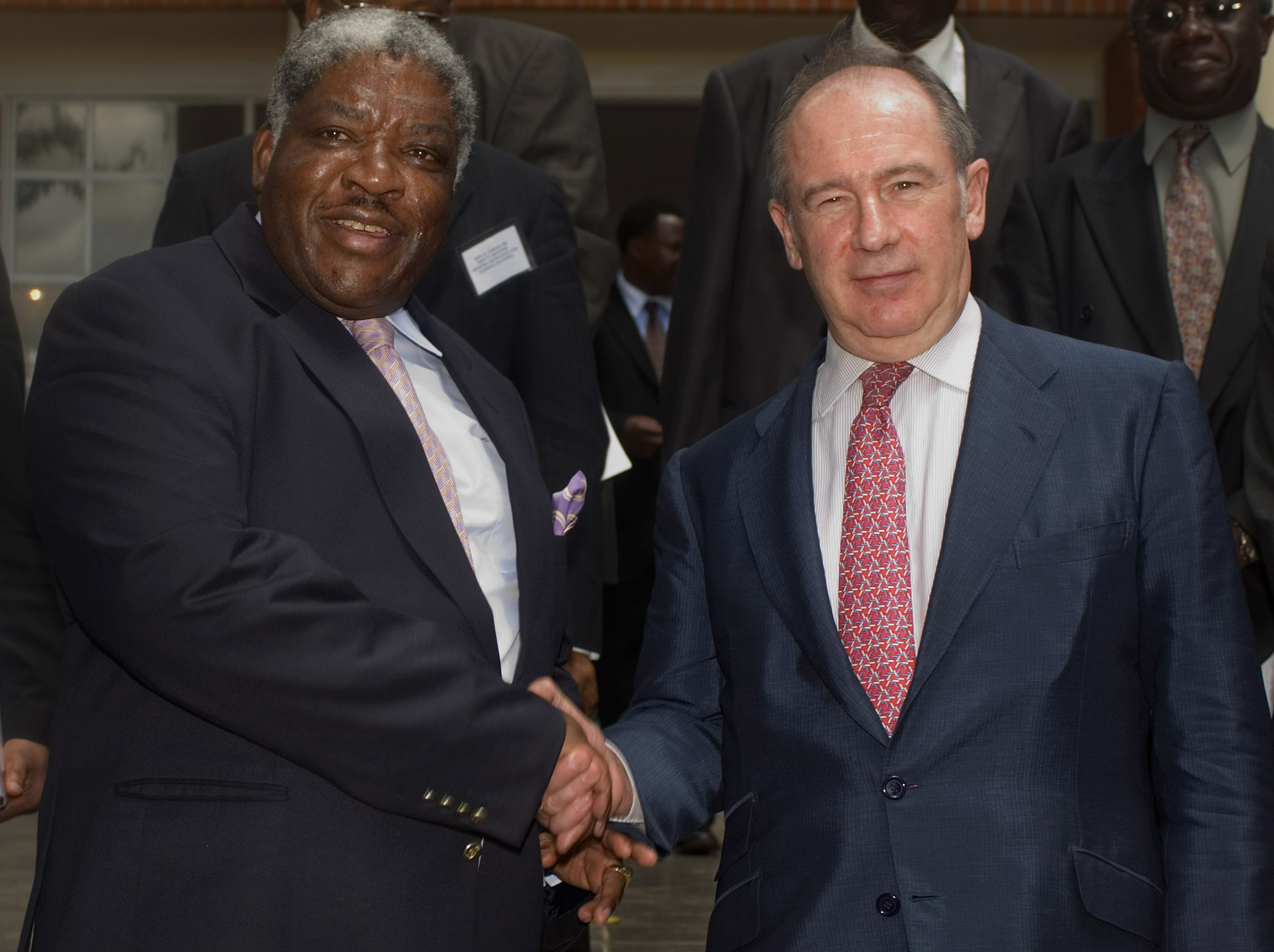
Levy Mwanawasa meeting with IMF Director Rodrigo Rato in 2006

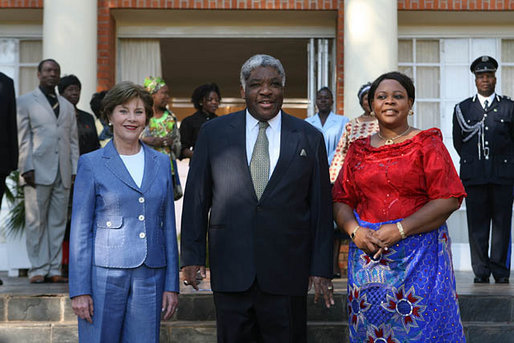
United States First Lady Laura Bush (L) with President Levy Mwanawasa (center) and his wife, First Lady Maureen Mwanawasa in 2007

Foreign investors liked Mwanawasa, owing partly to his anti-corruption drive. During his presidency, Zambia received foreign investment. The main driver of economic growth was minerals. Mwanawasa's policies helped to lower inflation and spread some benefits to the poor. Tourists and white farmers diverted from Zimbabwe and helped Zambian economy. Mwanawasa turned the Zambian town of Livingstone, near Victoria Falls, into a tourist hub. Zambia received a relatively large amount of aid and debt relief because of liberalisation and Mwanawasa's "stolid efforts". Overall, economic growth increased to about 6% per year.

Mwanawasa criticised President Robert Mugabe of neighbouring Zimbabwe. Mwanawasa was one of the first African leaders to publicly do so. When Mwanawasa died, Zimbabwean opposition leader Morgan Tsvangirai was among the first to publicly express grief.

Mwanawasa sold off Konkola Copper Mines to Vedanta for $25m despite an initial asking price of $400m. An amount (i.e. $25m) the company made back in around 3 months and was later making a minimum of $500m in profit per year despite its environmental pollutions of the local community.

Mwanawasa was open to accepting climate immigrants from Kiribati into Zambia, telling Anote Tong that the country had "plenty of room", but a deal was not finalized.

== Health ==
In April 2006, Mwanawasa experienced a mild stroke.

On 29 June 2008, while in Sharm el-Sheikh, Egypt, for an African Union summit, Mwanawasa was hospitalised due to a second stroke. On 1 July, International SOS evacuated him by air ambulance to France for further treatment. The head of the Egyptian hospital to which Mwanawasa was taken said that the doctors there had stopped the brain haemorrhage and that he was in a semi-comatose state. Vice-President Banda said that his condition was stable, and Minister of Information Mike Mulongoti noted that Mwanawasa had previously suffered from hypertension; Mulongoti also said that Mwanawasa was a "very hard working man" and said that this may have been a factor.

Due to Mwanawasa's incapacitation, Banda became acting president.

=== Death reports ===
On 3 July 2008 news outlets began reporting that Mwanawasa had died in a Paris hospital due to his stroke. The story originated at the Johannesburg-based 702 Talk Radio, which cited Malone Zaza, who claimed to be the head of protocol at Zambia's High Commission in Pretoria, South Africa; however, the commission denied having someone employed at the embassy with that name. Mulongoti, speaking for the government, said the news of Mwanawasa's death was "false", and he urged the South African media to show more restraint in its reporting. As the reports were spreading, South African President Thabo Mbeki called for a moment of silence in Mwanawasa's memory; the South African government quickly expressed regret over this misunderstanding and expressed Mbeki's hopes for Mwanawasa's recovery.

=== Treatment in France ===
Mwanawasa was hospitalised at the Percy Military Hospital in Clamart, near Paris. In a statement on 7 July 2008, Banda said that Mwanawasa "remain[ed] in a stable condition" but had to undergo surgery, which Banda described as minor, to correct a breathing problem. Banda said on 8 July that this operation was successful. On 11 July, Banda said that Mwanawasa's condition was stable and that his doctors were "satisfied with [his] current status".

Benny Tetamashimba, the MMD's chairman for Information and Publicity, subsequently said that the MMD "should begin looking for a successor" to Mwanawasa as president of the MMD. Mulongoti, speaking on state radio on 14 July, said that Tetamashimba's suggestion did not represent the government's views. United Party for National Development leader Hakainde Hichilema said that Mwanawasa's incapacitation had paralysed the functioning of the government. On 15 July, Patriotic Front leader Michael Sata questioned the official claims about Mwanawasa's health, and he called for a team of doctors to be sent by the Cabinet to examine Mwanawasa; this team would then disclose Mwanawasa's actual condition. On 17 July, the MMD announced that Tetamashimba was facing potential disciplinary action, including the possibility of expulsion from the party. Tetamashimba argued that he had been misunderstood. He also said that Mwanawasa's condition was improving and that he was "responding to treatment", while asserting that the government was functioning smoothly and criticising the opposition call for a team of doctors to report on Mwanawasa's health.

Banda gave another update of Mwanawasa's condition on 24 July, saying that he was making "steady progress … in his recovery". Skepticism regarding Banda's optimistic updates was reportedly widespread. Minister of Health Brian Chituwo, speaking before the National Assembly on 8 August, said that Mwanawasa's "healing process will indeed be long" due to the "serious nature of [his] illness".

=== Death ===
Vice-President Banda said on 18 August that Mwanawasa's condition had suddenly deteriorated and urgent medical intervention was necessary. The intervention was successful, according to Banda, but Mwanawasa remained in serious condition. On 19 August, a family member who wished to remain anonymous stated that Mwanawasa had died early that morning. The news of Mwanawasa's death was confirmed by Banda through a television broadcast on the government-owned Zambia National Broadcasting Corporation (ZNBC). He informed the nation that Mwanawasa had died that morning at 10:30 (8:30 GMT) at the Percy Military Hospital in Paris. Expressing "immense grief and deep sorrow", Banda declared national mourning for seven days and urged Zambians to "remain calm and mourn our President with dignity". The mourning period was extended to 21 days on 21 August. He is the first President of Zambia to die in office.

=== Reactions to death ===
The Patriotic Front's Michael Sata expressed sadness and said that Mwanawasa's death was a "national disaster", urging Zambians to remain calm. The Zambia Daily Mail, a state-owned newspaper, said that his death marked "a dark day for Zambia" and had left Zambians "shell-shocked and grief-stricken". As the country went into mourning, with flags flying at half-staff, the National Assembly session that had been in progress was indefinitely suspended; a strike by doctors was also suspended, and sporting matches were cancelled, all social events, weddings and birthday parties, were also cancelled. Joyous music in Zambian homes and bars was not heard during the mourning period. This gesture was later noted by the media as proof of the people's love for their president. Former president Kenneth Kaunda paid tribute to Mwanawasa, saying that he was "a true servant of the people who served this country with dignity and honour. … He observed the rule of law and he gallantly fought graft in all its forms. … We have lost a great leader who had a real vision for leadership and problems that face the country."

=== Funeral ===
Acting president Banda announced state funeral arrangements for Mwanawasa on 21 August. According to this programme, after Mwanawasa's body was returned to Zambia, it would first lie in state at Mulungushi International Conference Centre in Lusaka, the capital. The body would then be moved to different provincial capitals from 25 to 29 August, after which it would again lie in state at Mulungushi International Conference Centre until 2 September. His burial, planned for 3 September, was intended to coincide with his birthday; Mwanawasa would have turned 60 years old on that date.

Mwanawasa's body arrived in Lusaka from France aboard a French military aircraft on 23 August. It was received with full military honours; Banda and Kaunda were present for the ceremony, which featured a 21-gun salute and jet fighter planes in the sky. It was then taken to all provincial capitals of Zambia, where members of the public had an opportunity to pay their respects. The body was accompanied by both the opposition and the ruling party leaders beside the first family during the tour.

The burial of Mwanawasa occurred on 3 September at Embassy Park opposite the Zambian Cabinet Office. The funeral was attended by heads of 14 African states, including Mbeki, Zimbabwe's Robert Mugabe, and Tanzania's Jakaya Kikwete. In her eulogy at the funeral, Maureen Mwanawasa said of her husband: "Typical of you, you died on duty. You died a sad man as no one seemed to appreciate your sacrifices. Had you been with us today, I am sure these accolades could have made you happy."

==== International reactions ====
- African Union – African Union Chairman of the commission Jean Ping expressed condolences on 19 August, saying that Mwanawasa's death was "a great loss not only to the people of Zambia but also to the southern African region and the entire African continent." The chairman of the African Union, Jakaya Kikwete (also the president of Tanzania), said that "Africa will remember Mwanawasa for his role in resolving African conflicts particularly when he was chairperson of the Southern African Development Community."
- Commonwealth of Nations – Secretary-General Kamalesh Sharma: "He was deeply devoted in particular to the Commonwealth's goals of delivering development and prosperity to all, as well as its ideals of democracy, good governance, human rights and the rule of law. He strove hard to implement those objectives in Zambia and the region, especially in his role as the Chairman of the Southern African Development Community."
- France – President Nicolas Sarkozy: "The president of the Republic presents in his own name and in the name of the French people, his most saddened condolences to his family and the Zambian people."
- Kenya – President Mwai Kibaki: "During struggle for plural politics in Zambia, the late Mwanawasa played a pivotal role and was not only a source of inspiration and encouragement to the people but also displayed tremendous powers of the application of the rule of law."
- Namibia – President Hifikepunye Pohamba: "On behalf of the Government of the Republic of Namibia and indeed on my own behalf and that of the First Lady HE Mrs Penehupifo Pohamba, I wish to convey our deepest and most sincere condolences to the widow, HE Mrs Maureen Mwanawasa, the entire family and to the Government and people of the Republic of Zambia."
- South Africa – South African President Thabo Mbeki expressed "heartfelt condolences to the government and people of Zambia and to his widow Maureen Mwanawasa and the children". Later, at Mwanawasa's funeral, he said that Mwanawasa had contributed to "the restoration and strengthening of regional political unity and cohesion".
- Seychelles - President James Michel declared the day of the funeral as a National day of mourning and ordered flags to be at half mast.
- Tanzania – At Mwanawasa's funeral, Tanzanian President Jakaya Kikwete said that Mwanawasa was "a great leader, a true pan-Africanist and a champion of the poor".
- Uganda – State Minister for Foreign Affairs Okello Oryem said Ugandans "share Zambia's sorrow during this period of mourning," while the Leader of the Opposition in Parliament Prof. Ogenga Latigo stated, "Mr Mwanawasa will be remembered for his contribution in the fight against corruption."
- United Nations – Secretary-General Ban Ki-moon: "Mr. Mwanawasa was at the forefront of Zambian politics at a time of exceptional challenge and change in his country."
- United Nations – The General Assembly observed a minute silence and several ambassadors spoke in tribute of his life on behalf of various groups of nations.
- United States – President George W. Bush: "As Chairman of the Southern African Development Community, President Mwanawasa worked tirelessly to uphold the values of good governance, speaking out against human rights abuses and threats to democracy when many others were silent."
- Zimbabwe – Zimbabwean President Robert Mugabe said at the funeral: "Mwanawasa was a very courageous leader. He was very frank and wanted to change not only his country but the entire southern African region. We will greatly miss him."

== Personal life ==
Mwanawasa married Maureen Mwanawasa on 7 May 1987, and they remained married until his death. He had seven children: Miriam, Patrick, Lorna, Chipokota, Matolo, Lubona and Ntembe. His wife was a baptised member of the Jehovah's Witnesses but has since been disfellowshiped because of her active role in politics. It is against the faith of Jehovah's Witnesses to take part or sides in politics.

He became Baptist in 2005 and was baptized at Twin Palm Baptist Church in Lusaka.

In September 2007, Mwanawasa travelled to Arkansas in the United States to give a speech at Harding University in Searcy and received an honorary doctorate from the college. While in Arkansas, he addressed students and press at the University of Arkansas Clinton School of Public Service about social, economic, and political development in Zambia and the region with specific attention paid to HIV/AIDS in Africa and President Mugabe of Zimbabwe.

== Electoral history ==
Electoral history of Levy Mwanawasa
Year	Office	Party	Votes received				Result
Year	Office	Party	Total	%	P.	Swing	Result
2001	President of Zambia	MMD	506,694	29.15%	1st	—N/a	Won
2006	President of Zambia	MMD	1,177,846	42.98%	1st	+13.83	Won

Political offices
Preceded by Frederick Chiluba	President of Zambia; 2002–2008	Succeeded by Rupiah Banda
Preceded by Office restored	Vice-President of Zambia; 1991–1994	Succeeded by Godfrey Miyanda
