= Guy Scott =

Acting President of Zambia from 2014 to 2015

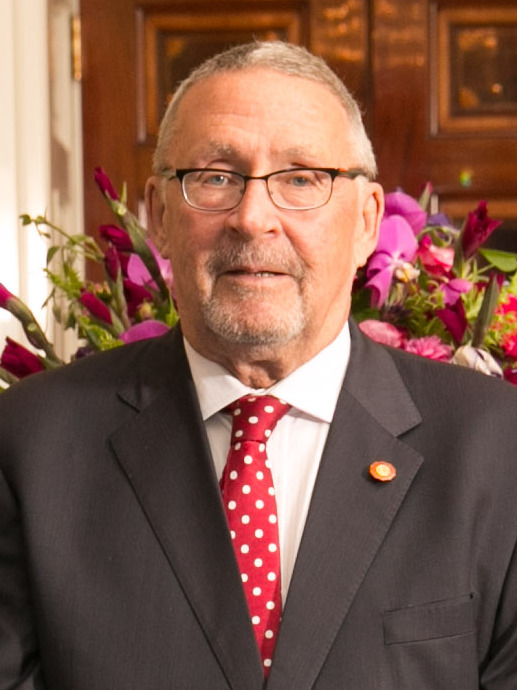
- Scott at the White House in 2014

Acting President of Zambia
- In office 29 October 2014 – 25 January 2015
- Vice President: Vacant
- Preceded by: Michael Sata
- Succeeded by: Edgar Lungu

12th Vice President of Zambia
- In office 23 September 2011 – 29 October 2014
- President: Michael Sata
- Preceded by: George Kunda
- Succeeded by: Inonge Wina (2015)

Member of Parliament
- In office 2006–2016
- Preceded by: Dipak Patel
- Succeeded by: Margaret Mwanakatwe
- Constituency: Lusaka Central
- In office 1991–1996
- Succeeded by: Michael Sata
- Constituency: Mpika Central

Personal details
- Born: Guy Lindsay Scott; 1 June 1944 Livingstone, Batoka Province, Northern Rhodesia^{[a]}
- Died: 15 July 2026 (aged 82) Lusaka, Zambia
- Party: UPND (2021–2026)
- Other political affiliations: Patriotic Front (2001–2016); MMD (1990–1996)
- Spouse: Charlotte Harland (m. 1994)
- Children: 4
- Education: University of Cambridge; University of Sussex
- a. Now the Southern Province, Zambia

Guy Lindsay Scott (1 June 1944 – 15 July 2026) was a Zambian politician who served as acting president of Zambia from 2014 to 2015 and was the 12th vice president from 2011 to 2014. Scott became acting president upon Michael Sata's death in office on 28 October 2014. This made him the first head of state of European descent in mainland Africa since F. W. de Klerk in 1994.

== Early life and education ==
Guy Lindsay Scott was born on 1 June 1944 in the border city of Livingstone, the pre-1935 capital of what was then Northern Rhodesia (today Zambia). His father, Alec Scott, was a doctor who had emigrated to Northern Rhodesia from Glasgow, Scotland, in 1927 to work on Cecil Rhodes' railways, whilst his mother Grace, had emigrated from England in 1940. During the 1950s, his father was a member of parliament for the Federation of Rhodesia and Nyasaland, representing Lusaka as an independent politician. Scott's eventual participation in politics was largely inspired by his father, who had been an ally of Zambian nationalists and had founded several newspapers that advocated for independence.

Scott completed his primary and secondary education at Springvale School and Peterhouse Boys' School, respectively, both located in what was then Southern Rhodesia (today Zimbabwe). He continued his education in England, taking his undergraduate degree in mathematics and economics at Trinity Hall, Cambridge University, from 1962 until he graduated in 1965. Scott then returned home to newly independent Zambia, renounced his right to British citizenship, collected his Zambian passport, and was employed by the government planning office in the section dealing with human resources. During this period, he was also the deputy editor of a monthly magazine called Business and Economy of East and Central Africa and he began his first forays into farming ("producing all manner of agricultural products that were being denied us by the trade disruption with Rhodesia").

In 1970, Scott and Malcolm Christie co-founded an agribusiness venture known as Walkover Estates, which focused on growing high-value crops, such as irrigated wheat, strawberries, and a wide range of off-season vegetables. Walkover's strawberries were exported to the UK and sold in Sainsbury's supermarkets, illustrating the commercial success of the business. During this time, Scott was considered a model employer who spoke the local language and was known for his inclusive parties and social gatherings.

Disillusioned by the country's political and economic situation, Scott left Zambia with his young family in 1981, and after spending a year doing business in Kenya, moved to England in 1982. In England, he decided to pursue a new career and enrolled at the University of Sussex, where he studied cognitive science and artificial intelligence (AI), receiving his master's degree in 1983 and his doctorate in 1986. His doctoral thesis focused on the subfield of AI called computer vision and was entitled "Local and global interpretation of moving images".

== Scientific career ==
Scott's scientific career, from 1982 to 1990, was relatively brief but impactful. At Sussex University he was in the Cognitive Studies Programme that had been founded in the early 1970s; it was later renamed the School of Cognitive and Computing Sciences in 1987, the Centre for Research in Cognitive Science in 2003, and the Centre for Cognitive Science (COGS) in 2013. Through this centre, Sussex became one of the first universities in the world to offer academic programmes in cognitive science, a wide-ranging field that brings together an array of different disciplines to investigate cognitive processes, both natural and artificial. This interdisciplinarity was a defining feature of Scott's scientific career and his subsequent political career. Although he ostensibly specialised in computer vision, his research was enriched by ideas from many other fields. For example, his 1986 doctoral thesis draws insights from physics, mathematics, psychology, computer science, and engineering. The thesis was published as a scholarly monograph under the same title in 1988.

After obtaining his PhD at Sussex, Scott joined Oxford University as a researcher in the Department of Engineering Science and a fellow of the otherwise all-female Somerville College. At Oxford, he was a member of the Robotics Research Group that was involved in several pioneering autonomous guided vehicle (AGV) projects.

The available evidence suggests that Scott's scientific publications were influential and of high quality. For instance, he won the best paper award at the Second Alvey Vision Conference in 1986. However, it is difficult to be definitive about the precise nature and number of his publications since there is no complete bibliography of his scientific work. Nonetheless, Google Scholar and Google Search queries indicate several papers in peer-reviewed journals and many presentations and papers in conferences and other meetings. A notable outlier is Scott's UK patent for a "distance-measuring apparatus" for computer vision applications.

Scott's most significant scientific contribution is a highly cited 1991 journal paper that he co-authored with Hugh Christopher Longuet-Higgins. It introduced what is now known in the computer vision literature as the Scott and Longuet-Higgins (SLH) algorithm. The SLH algorithm is a non-iterative method for solving the feature correspondence problem (matching points between two related images) using the singular value decomposition of a proximity/association matrix. Borrowing spectral techniques from structural chemistry (Longuet-Higgins' original field), this work has been described as "a landmark paper" and remains a standard reference in point-pattern matching, spectral graph matching, point-set registration, and even medical/neuroimaging correspondence problems, cited continuously from 1991 into the 2020s. Its known weaknesses, such as sensitivity to large rotation/scaling differences and some numerical instability, have themselves spawned a substantial corrective literature (e.g., Shapiro & Brady 1992), further cementing its foundational status.

== Political career ==
In 1990, Scott returned to Zambia and joined the Movement for Multi-Party Democracy (MMD) and was elected to be chair of its Agriculture Committee during the first party convention.

Scott was elected as Member of Parliament for Mpika Central on the MMD ticket in the National Assembly during the 1991 general election and was subsequently appointed Minister of Agriculture, Food and Fisheries. He presided over a number of policy reforms and was responsible for managing the "drought of the century" in January and February 1992. There was no reserve maize in Zambia and none in southern Africa, so emergency arrangements had to be made to import it from overseas and move it into Zambia on dilapidated rail and road networks. He also oversaw the drought recovery "bumper harvest" of 1992–93. However, he was sacked by President Frederick Chiluba on 15 April 1993.

In 1996, Scott resigned from the MMD to form the Lima Party together with Ben Kapita, the president of the Zambia National Farmers Union. He piloted the merger between the Lima Party and other parties including Dean Mungomba's Zambia Democratic Congress to form the Zambia Alliance for Progress. In 2001, he returned to politics and joined the Patriotic Front, returning to the National Assembly after being elected MP for Lusaka Central in the 2006 general election. He was an active and vocal critic of Chinese debt diplomacy.

=== Vice-president ===
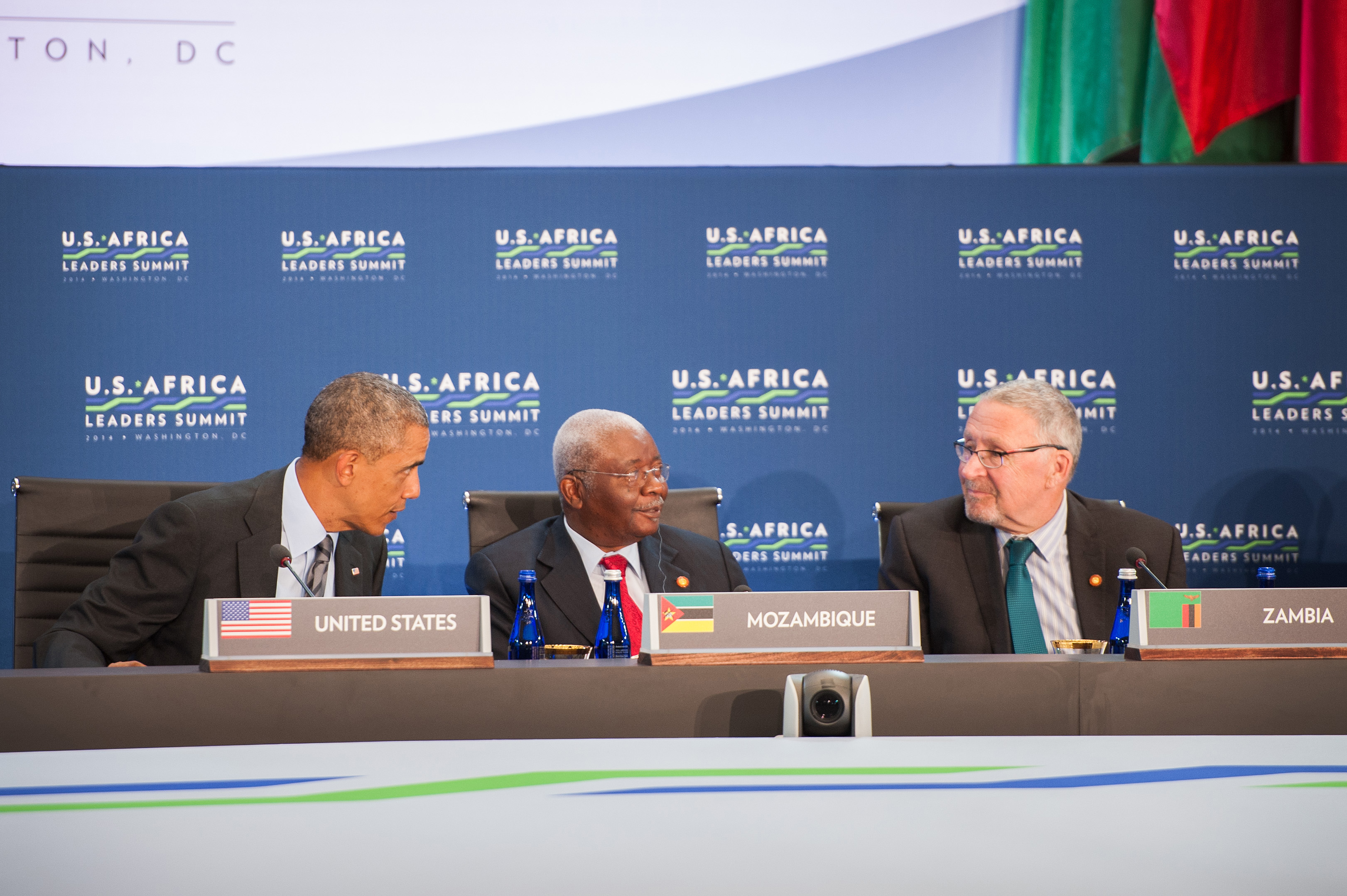
Guy Scott attending the United States–Africa Leaders Summit.

A presidential election was held on 20 September 2011, and final results released on 23 September 2011 showed the Patriotic Front's presidential candidate, Michael Sata, winning over MMD's Rupiah Banda by a large margin. Scott was sworn in as vice-president of the Republic of Zambia on 29 September 2011, the first white Zambian deputy leader since its independence. Concurrent with his vice-presidency tenure, he was once again the Lusaka Central member of parliament.

Shortly after his election, The Guardian quoted Scott as saying: "I have long suspected Zambia is moving from a post-colonial to a cosmopolitan condition. People's minds are changing: they are no longer sitting back and dwelling on what was wrong about colonialism". Referring to a 2012 meeting with former United States President George W. Bush (who sponsors various charity initiatives in Zambia), he said, "when they introduced me as Vice President, he thought they were kidding".

=== Acting President ===
After Michael Sata's death on 28 October 2014, Scott became acting president for an interim period of no more than ninety days until a new election could be held to permanently fill the office, as required by Article 38 of the Constitution of Zambia. This made him the first African white head of state since 1994.

Since the parentage clause of Article 34 of the Constitution required that both parents of presidential candidates be "Zambian by birth or descent," Scott was considered ineligible to stand for the office due to his parents being Scottish and English immigrants. That provision had been put in place by President Frederick Chiluba to prevent Kenneth Kaunda – whose father was born in what became Malawi – from becoming president again. However, a previous judgement by the Supreme Court of Zambia, in a similar case in 1998, could have validated him as a potential candidate. Nevertheless, Scott did not stand as the presidential candidate for his political party, the Patriotic Front.

On 3 November 2014, Scott dismissed Edgar Lungu as Secretary General of the Patriotic Front; however, he reinstated him a day later, after street protests in Lusaka. On 17 December 2014, Scott rejected calls from cabinet members asking him to resign as acting president.

Lungu, standing as the Patriotic Front's candidate, won the January 2015 presidential by-election and succeeded Scott as Zambia's sixth president on 25 January 2015.

=== Post-presidency ===
Scott left the Patriotic Front before the 2016 general election.

In 2019, he published Adventures in Zambian Politics: A Story in Black and White, a book about both the history of Zambia and his own political career. In March 2021, he joined the United Party for National Development, with party president Hakainde Hichilema appointing him as the chief consultant and a member of the national management committee.

== Personal life and death ==
Scott married British-born economic and social development specialist Charlotte Harland, in a ceremony at the Lusaka Civic Centre in 1994. They resided in Lusaka.

Scott died at his farm in Lusaka, on 15 July 2026, following an illness. He was 82, and had Parkinson's disease and dementia. President Hakainde Hichilema announced that he would be given a state funeral.

== Books ==
- Scott, Guy (2019). Adventures in Zambian Politics: A Story in Black and White. Boulder, Colorado: Lynne Rienner Publishers. ISBN 978-1-62637-759-2. LCCN 2018032409. OCLC 1044772938.

Political offices
Preceded by George Kunda	Vice-President of Zambia; 2011–2014	Succeeded by Inonge Wina
Preceded by Michael Sata	President of Zambia; Acting; 2014–2015	Succeeded by Edgar Lungu
