= Frederick Chiluba =

Former President of Zambia (1991–2002)

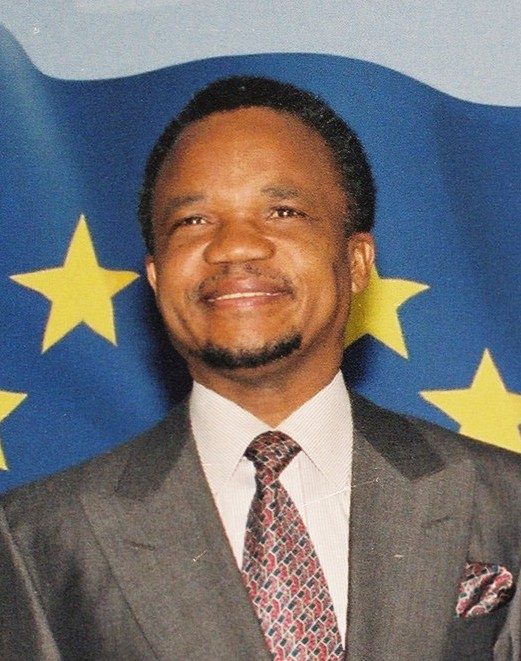
- Chiluba in 1994

2nd President of Zambia
- In office 2 November 1991 – 2 January 2002
- Vice President: Levy Mwanawasa; Godfrey Miyanda; Christon Tembo; Enoch Kavindele
- Preceded by: Kenneth Kaunda
- Succeeded by: Levy Mwanawasa

Personal details
- Born: 30 April 1943 Musangu village, Mwense District, Luapula Province Northern Rhodesia
- Died: 18 June 2011 (aged 68) Lusaka, Zambia
- Resting place: Embassy Park; 15.421884°S 28.309314°E
- Party: MMD
- Spouse(s): Vera Tembo (1967–2000); Regina Mwanza (2002–2011)
- Children: 9
- Profession: Trade Union official

Frederick Jacob Titus Chiluba (30 April 1943 – 18 June 2011) was a Zambian politician who was the second president of Zambia from 1991 to 2002. Chiluba, a trade union leader, won the country's multi-party presidential election in 1991 as the candidate of the Movement for Multi-party Democracy (MMD), defeating long-time President Kenneth Kaunda. He was re-elected in 1996. As he was unable to run for a third term in 2001, former Vice President Levy Mwanawasa instead ran as the MMD candidate and succeeded him. After leaving office, Chiluba was the subject of a long investigation and trial regarding alleged corruption; he was eventually acquitted in 2009.

== Early life ==
Chiluba was born to Jacob Titus Chiluba Nkonde and Diana Kaimba and grew up in Luapula Province where he was born. He did his basic education at Mambilima Mbolo Special School and his secondary education at Kawambwa Boys Technical Secondary School in Kawambwa, where he was expelled in the second year for political activities. He became a bus conductor, and later a politician. He worked as a city councilor before becoming an accounts assistant at Atlas Copco. He later joined the National Union of Building.

== Personal life ==
Chiluba and his second wife, former First Lady of Zambia Vera Tembo, with whom he had nine children, divorced in 2000 after 33 years of marriage. Tembo has gone on to pursue a political career of her own, becoming MMD Chairperson for Women's Affairs, being elected to the Zambian Parliament, and becoming deputy Minister of the Environment in 2006. On 6 May 2002, Chiluba married his third wife, Regina Mwanza, the former chairperson of women's affairs for the Movement for Multi-Party Democracy (MMD), in Lusaka.

Chiluba's personal appearance and dapper dress as well as his short stature (he stood 1.5 m (5 ft) tall) was commented on both by his supporters and opponents throughout his career. In connection with European corruption allegations against him in the late 2000s, it was revealed that a Swiss shop had produced over 100 pairs of size 6 shoes for him with two inch heels, many monogrammed.

His careful appearance and taste for fine suits became a trademark, and was noted during his corruption trial. Roy Clarke, writing in The Post, ran a recurring column which lampooned the President during his time in office as "a vain, cross-dressing, high-heel wearing, adulterous, dwarf thief". Political opponents made reference to these charges and traits in their criticisms of Chiluba's rule. Candidate Michael Sata, for instance, said "Chiluba's thinking is as tall as he is... We are not going to steal money, we are not going to plunder, we are not going to buy suits, we are not going to buy shoes. We are not going to give girls houses..." Kaunda referred to Chiluba as the "Four-foot Dwarf" during Chiluba's rise in opposition politics. Chiluba was acquitted of all corruption charges in August 2009. Chiluba had also been described by the BBC as "a fervent born-again Christian [whose] private life was the subject of much gossip."

== Unions ==
Chiluba went on to win the chairmanship of the Zambia Congress of Trade Unions (ZCTU). He and several leaders in ZCTU were detained in 1981 by President Kenneth Kaunda for calling a wildcat strike that paralyzed most of the Zambian economy. The union leaders were released after a judge ruled their detention as unconstitutional. In 1987, he successfully withstood challenge to his chairmanship of NUBEGW that would have put his ZCTU position in jeopardy.

== Politics ==
In 1990, soon after UNIP gave up its monopoly on power, he helped form the Movement for Multiparty Democracy (MMD), and became its presidential candidate in the snap 1991 election called as part of the deal that ended one-party rule. Due in part to festering resentment at UNIP's 25-year rule (including 17 years as the only legal party), Chiluba defeated Kaunda in a massive landslide, taking 75 percent of the vote to Kaunda's 25 percent–the second-biggest margin of victory for a contested election in Zambian history. Chiluba took office on 2 November of that year. On 29 December 1991, he declared Zambia a Christian nation. This declaration was included in the 2016 Constitutional Amendment Bill which is part of the current Constitution of the Republic of Zambia. He won re-election to a second five-year term in 1996 despite a lawsuit questioning his birthplace and hence his eligibility for the post.

Chiluba attempted to deport Kaunda on the grounds that he was a Malawian. He amended the constitution in order to stop citizens with foreign parentage from standing for the presidency, aimed at disqualifying Kaunda. His attempt to deport Kaunda was unsuccessful as Kaunda's Zambian citizenship was confirmed by the Lewanika and Others vs. Chiluba Supreme Court ruling in 2000.

Some candidates in the 1996 presidential elections challenged his eligibility on these grounds, claiming that he or his real father was born in Zaire. However, he was raised in the Copperbelt of Zambia and this contributed to his taking up of unionism.

In 1997 his government survived a coup attempt after which Chiluba immediately declared a state of emergency and began jailing, without charges, persons suspected of involvement in the coup. These included several Zambian politicians, including those from opposition parties and the country's previous President, Kenneth Kaunda.

In late 2001, Chiluba divorced his second wife, Vera, with whom he had nine children, namely Helen, Miko, Hortensia, Castro, Chongo, Kaindu, Huldah, Frederick Jr and Verocia . With his first wife he had Tito and Nikombe.

He later married the MMD Women's Chairperson, Regina Mwanza a divorcee. Despite his party's overwhelming majority in parliament, he failed to win support in his bid to amend the constitution allowing him to run for a third term. No member of parliament ever moved the motion in the house to amend the national constitution, the government never presented any paper on the matter nor was there any referendum to amend the national constitution. The third term debate was between different groups within and outside the MMD. Chiluba himself was quiet about it. He stepped down at the end of his term on 2 January 2002, and was replaced by Levy Mwanawasa, his one-time vice-president. Chiluba started out as a socialist, but accepted some economic reforms.

Chiluba can be said to have left both an economic and a political legacy. Economically he started the process of ending Zambia's socialist command economy. He presided over various economic reforms. He worked closely with British Prime Minister John Major throughout the early 1990s to reduce Zambia's debt. Major and Chiluba restructured Zambia's debt to Britain which allowed Zambia to begin paying off debts to other foreign countries without their credit being negatively affected. This was considered the most successful debt restructuring Africa during the 1990s.

Chiluba opposed international economic institutions. His successor Levy Mwanawasa re-established relations with IMF and World Bank which had been abolished during Chiluba's government. This view contradicts Chiluba's economic reforms which included the Privatisation of Parastatals which he spearheaded with close cooperation with the World Bank and the IMF. Chiluba is also credited with kickstarting the privatisation of ZCCM (Zambia Consolidatited Copper Mines) in the late 1990s, the country's crown jewel.

== Corruption ==
After leaving office, Chiluba was a target of Mwanawasa's campaign against corruption: in February 2003, he was charged along with his former intelligence chief, Xavier Chungu, and several former ministers and senior officials, with 168 counts of theft totalling more than $40m.

It was alleged that money was diverted from the Ministry of Finance into an account held at the London branch of the Zambia National Commercial Bank (Zanaco). Chiluba said the account was used by the country's intelligence services to fund operations abroad. Investigators said it was a slush fund, used to meet Chiluba and Chungu's private and personal expenses.

Most of the charges that were made against him were later dropped, but others remained. In addition, his wife Regina was arrested for receiving stolen goods.

In early 2006, Chiluba was flown to South Africa for medical attention for a heart condition. After resisting the government's call for him to return to Zambia for what they termed as long-term treatment, he returned on 15 July.

On 4 May 2007 he was found guilty of stealing $46m (£23m) in a civil case by a UK court. London high court judge Peter Smith accused Chiluba of shamelessly defrauding his people and flaunting his wealth with an expensive wardrobe of "stupendous proportions". He also castigated his lawyer, Iqbal Meer, saying "I am satisfied that no honest solicitor in his position would have done what he did." His unquestioning acceptance of the money - transferred to a London bank account by the Zambian intelligence service - was "classic blind eye dishonesty". An appeal against the ruling was allowed by the court of appeal in 2008. Large sections of Zambian society have however questioned Peter Smith's credibility following reprimands and recusals by the British judiciary. Many have argued that the British Judge should have concentrated on cases pertaining to properties that were allegedly obtained by corrupt means in Britain and Europe rather than properties in Zambia. However, after offering Chiluba's clothes to his family in 2016, the Anti-Corruption Commission later secured a judgement in the Supreme Court of Zambia where Chiluba's estate (Tedworth Properties) was forfeited to the state after seizing it in 2002.

Chiluba, however, continued to plead innocence and refused to recognise the verdict of the Judge Peter Smith who he accused of having been bribed by the Mwanawasa government. It is yet to be seen what effect the civil ruling in the UK will have on the criminal proceedings in the Zambian courts. Chiluba indicated at the time that the judgement in the UK had rendered the criminal proceedings in Zambia academic by heavily prejudicing his case.

On 7 June, the amount, which Chiluba was ordered to repay, was increased to $58m, accounting for interest and legal costs. Several days later, Judge Smith ordered Chiluba to leave his home in Lusaka within two weeks because it was judged to have been bought with money stolen from the public.

Chiluba collapsed on 24 May 2007 due to heart trouble and was hospitalized. He was released from the hospital on 29 May, and on 30 May doctors judged him to be fit to stand trial on the embezzlement charges following an examination. On 31 May, a court ruled that his trial should proceed, although his lawyers argued that it should not due to his poor health. The judge rejected arguments from Chiluba's lawyers and doctors that the former president is too sick to face prosecution over graft charges. On 27 July he was flown to South Africa to be treated for heart trouble; this had been approved by the government earlier in the month. He was scheduled to appear in court for his trial on 14 August, and he returned to Zambia on 11 August, saying in an interview that he was "surviving on God's will". His spokesman said that his illness made it uncertain whether he would appear in court; in July, it was ruled that, if necessary, Chiluba would participate in the trial through video or a judge would go to his home. On 14 August, Chiluba rejected the idea of participating in the trial through video, saying that it would be illegal.

After appearing briefly in court on 14 August, Chiluba was present for the resumption of trial proceedings on 15 August. Chiluba took breaks during the day for health reasons.

Chiluba's wife Regina was arrested on 3 September for allegedly receiving money and property stolen by Chiluba during his time in office, despite having previously been released after the case against her had been dropped on 24 August. Chiluba and his wife protested the arrest.

In May 2008, the government announced that it had recovered nearly 60 million dollars in money and assets allegedly stolen during Chiluba's presidency.

Having long suffered from health problems, Mwanawasa died later in 2008. Chiluba was acquitted on all charges on 17 August 2009. Scores of people packed the Lusaka Magistrates Court to hear Judge Jones Chinyama final judgement which concluded that Dr. Frederick Chiluba was not guilty of the corruption charges laid against him and hence was acquitted.

== Political stances after leaving office ==
Chiluba's relationship with President Mwanawasa and the MMD soured badly after he was charged with corruption. He backed Mwanawasa's main opponent, Michael Sata, in the 2006 presidential election. After Mwanawasa's death in 2008, Vice-president Rupiah Banda succeeded him and Chiluba's fortunes improved markedly. Chiluba was acquitted in 2009—a decision that Sata alleged was "engineered" by Banda—and President Banda refused to allow the state to appeal the verdict or pursue the matter further. Chiluba announced in January 2010 that he was supporting Banda for re-election in 2011, while also criticising the main opposition leaders. Transparency International argued that Chiluba was endorsing Banda "so that he can be guaranteed his freedom", and Sata was similarly critical: "Chiluba will do anything possible to ensure that his friend remains in power."

== Death ==
Chiluba died of a heart attack on 18 June 2011, shortly after midnight. His spokesman, Emmanuel Mwamba, announced his death. Mwamba stated that Chiluba had a normal day on 17 June, and even had time to meet some of his lawyers. He had later complained of stomach pains.

== Electoral history ==
Electoral history of Frederick Chiluba
Year	Office	Party	Votes received				Result
Year	Office	Party	Total	%	P.	Swing	Result
1991	President of Zambia	MMD	972,605	75.77%	1st	—N/a	Won
1996	President of Zambia	MMD	913,770	72.59%	1st	-3.18	Won

== See also ==
- Christianity in Zambia

Political offices
Preceded by Kenneth Kaunda	President of Zambia; 1991–2002	Succeeded by Levy Mwanawasa
Trade union offices
Preceded by New position	President of the Zambia Congress of Trade Unions; 1974–1991	Succeeded by Fackson Shamenda
