= Michael Sata =

President of Zambia from 2011 to 2014

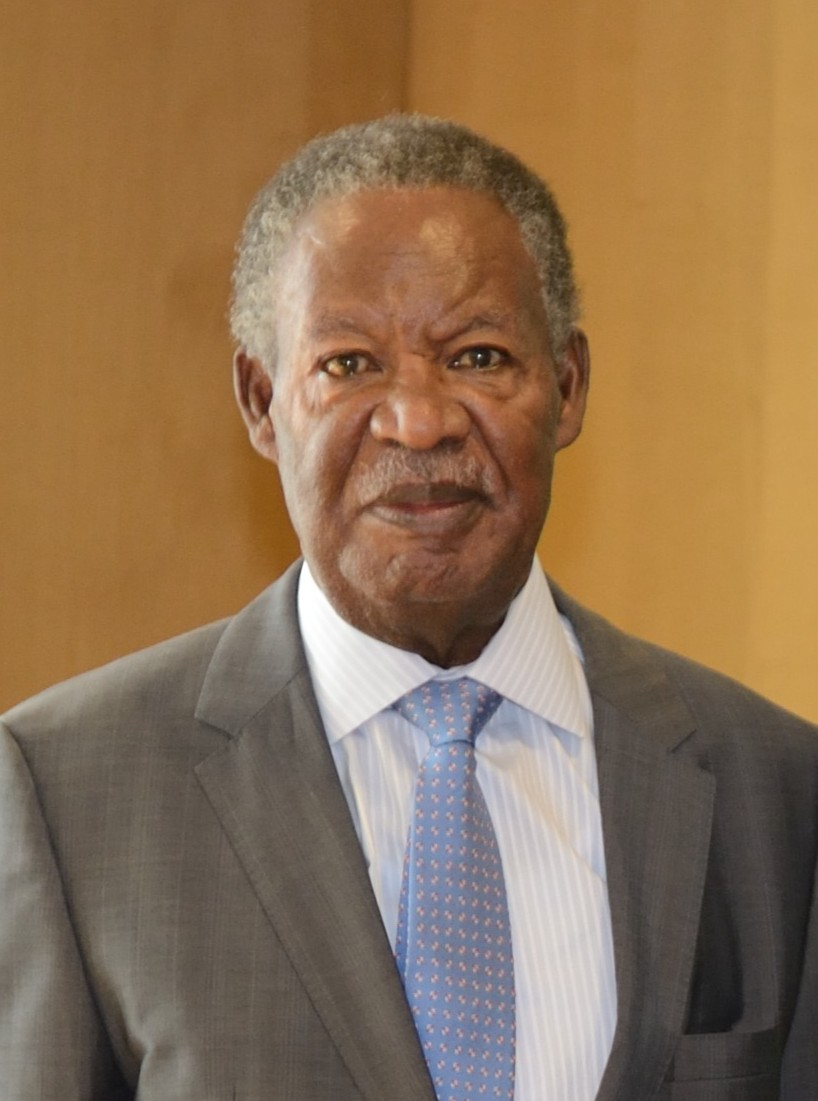
- Sata in 2014

5th President of Zambia
- In office 23 September 2011 – 28 October 2014
- Vice President: Guy Scott
- Preceded by: Rupiah Banda
- Succeeded by: Guy Scott (acting); Edgar Lungu

Member of the National Assembly for Mpika
- In office 18 November 1996 – 27 December 2001
- Preceded by: Guy Scott
- Succeeded by: Mateyo Mwaba

Member of the National Assembly for Kabwata
- In office 1983 – 18 November 1996
- Preceded by: Maxwell Sibongo
- Succeeded by: Godfrey Miyanda

Personal details
- Born: 6 July 1937 Mpika, Awemba North, Northern Rhodesia
- Died: 28 October 2014 (aged 77) London, England
- Resting place: Embassy Park
- Party: Patriotic Front (2001–2014); MMD (1991–2001); UNIP (Before 1991)
- Spouse(s): Margaret Manda; Christine Kaseba
- Children: 8
- Occupation: Police officer and trade unionist
- Nickname(s): King Cobra

Michael Charles Chilufya Sata (6 July 1937 – 28 October 2014) was a Zambian politician who served as the fifth president of Zambia from 2011 until his death in 2014. A social democrat, he led the Patriotic Front (PF), a major political party in Zambia. Under President Frederick Chiluba, Sata was a minister during the 1990s as part of the Movement for Multiparty Democracy (MMD) government. He went into opposition in 2001, forming the PF.

As an opposition leader, Sata – popularly known as "The King Cobra", emerged as the leading opposition presidential contender and rival to President Levy Mwanawasa in the 2006 presidential election, but was defeated. Following Mwanawasa's death, Sata ran again in 2008, losing to Rupiah Banda.

After ten years in opposition, Sata defeated Banda, the incumbent, to win the September 2011 presidential election with a plurality of the vote. He died in London on 28 October 2014, leaving Vice President Guy Scott as Acting President until a presidential by-election was held on 20 January 2015.

== Early years ==
Michael Charles Chilufya Sata was born on 6 July 1937, and brought up in Mpika, Northern Province. He worked under the Zambian Police Service as a police officer, then later as railway man and trade unionist during colonial rule. He spent some time in London working on the railway as a cleaner. Among other things, he was a porter at Victoria railway station. Sata began actively participating in the politics of Northern Rhodesia in 1963. Following independence, Sata worked his way up through the rough-and-tumble rank-and-file of the ruling United National Independence Party (UNIP) to the governorship of Lusaka in 1985. As Governor, he made his mark as a man of action with a hands on approach. He cleaned up the streets, patched roadways and built bridges in the city. Afterward he became a member of parliament for Kabwata constituency in Lusaka in 1983. Though once close with President Kenneth Kaunda, he became disillusioned by Kaunda's dictatorial style and he left the UNIP to join the Movement for Multiparty Democracy (MMD) during the campaign for multi-party politics in 1991.

== Early politics ==
After Frederick Chiluba of the MMD was elected the president of Zambia ahead of Kaunda in 1991, Sata became one of Zambia's most instantly recognisable faces. Under the MMD, he served as minister for local government, labour and, briefly, health where, he stated that his "reforms brought sanity to the health system".

In 1995, he was appointed minister without portfolio, the party's national organising secretary during which his political style was described as "increasingly abrasive". After 13 years as the Kabwata member of parliament, he chose to contest for the position of member of parliament for Mpika constituency at the 1996 general election and was he elected.

== Formation of Patriotic Front ==
In 2001, President Chiluba nominated Levy Mwanawasa as the MMD's presidential candidate for the 2001 election. In frustration, Sata left the MMD and set up a new party, the Patriotic Front (PF). He contested the 2001 election but did not do well—his party only won one seat in parliament (at Lupososhi).

== 2006 election and afterwards ==
Sata contested the September 2006 presidential election as a populist championing the causes of the poor in the face of Mwanawasa's economic reform policies. While others on the slate of candidates contesting the election frequently resorted to personal attacks and insults, Sata's remarks were at times quite equally scathing. At one campaign event in particular, Sata was reported to have ripped apart a cabbage in front of his supporters. The cabbage was a reference to Mwanawasa's speech impediment, which was the result of an injury sustained in a 1992 car crash. He has also accused Mwanawasa of "selling out" Zambia to international interests, and at one event, he referred to Hong Kong as a country and Taiwan as a sovereign state. In response, China threatened to cut off relations with Zambia if he was elected. Sata's right-hand man in the campaign was Dr. Guy Scott, the Patriotic Front secretary general. Scott is a white Zambian politician. He served a number of ministerial positions during the Chiluba government. Sata also received the public backing of Chiluba.

Initial results from the election gave Sata the lead, but further results put Mwanawasa in first place and pushed Sata into third place. Interim results released after votes from 120 of 150 constituencies were counted put Mwanawasa on just over 42% of the vote; Hakainde Hichilema had 28%; and the Michael Sata had slipped to 27%. When opposition supporters heard that Sata had slipped from first to third place, riots erupted in Lusaka. On 2 October, the Zambian Electoral Commission announced that Mwanawasa had officially won the election; final results put Sata in second place with about 29% of the vote.

Sata was arrested in early December 2006, accused of making a false declaration of his assets when applying to run for president in August, along with other charges. He was questioned by police and released on bail. Sata said the charges were politically motivated, and in court he pleaded not guilty to them. On 14 December, the charges were dropped on the grounds that the declaration of assets was not made under oath.

On 15 March 2007, Sata was deported from Malawi shortly after arrival. Sata said that he was only there to meet with the business community, and alleged that the Zambian government had effected the deportation by falsely claiming that Sata was in Malawi to assist that country's former president, Bakili Muluzi. The Zambian government denied this, while the Malawian government gave no explanation for Sata's deportation. On 6 April, Sata's lawyer said that he had initiated a lawsuit against the Malawian government for violating his rights.

After losing his passport in London in late 2007, Sata was issued another; however, on 10 November 2007, Minister of Home Affairs Ronnie Shikapwasha announced that Sata's passport was withdrawn temporarily because he had obtained the new passport without following the necessary procedures and proving that he needed a new passport. Shikapwasha said that an investigation would follow, that Sata had been interrogated, and that he could face arrest.

Sata suffered a heart attack on 25 April 2008 and was evacuated to Milpark Hospital in Johannesburg, South Africa, where he was said to be in stable condition on 26 April. He reconciled with President Mwanawasa in May 2008.

== Mwanawasa's death and the 2008 election ==
After Mwanawasa suffered a stroke and was hospitalised in France, Sata questioned the official claims about Mwanawasa's health on 15 July 2008, and he called for a team of doctors to be sent by the Cabinet to examine Mwanawasa; this team would then disclose Mwanawasa's actual condition. Mwanawasa died in office in August 2008. On 25 August, Sata attempted to attend funeral proceedings for Mwanawasa at Chipata in Eastern Province; however, Maureen Mwanawasa, Mwanawasa's widow, ordered Sata to leave, saying that he was politicising the event and that he had never reconciled with Mwanawasa's family. Sata, who was removed from the scene by security, said that he was only there to mourn Mwanawasa and that he had hoped to escort the body while it was taken to provincial capitals across Zambia; he maintained that his reconciliation with Mwanawasa himself was sufficient to justify his presence. He also said that Maureen Mwanawasa had acted inappropriately.

Sata was unanimously chosen as the PF's candidate for the presidential by-election at a meeting of its Central Committee on 30 August 2008. Accepting the nomination, he expressed the need "to scrub this country and wash it"; he also said that he would refrain from campaigning until after Mwanawasa's funeral. Despite his April 2008 heart attack, Sata said that he was healthy and in good condition.

Sata said that he would not accept a victory for Banda because there was "no way MMD can win", and he alleged that the Electoral Commission and the police were working together to rig the election. Although he held the lead in early vote counting, which reflected his strong support in urban areas, his lead grew smaller as votes from rural areas were counted. In the end, Banda overtook Sata, and final results on 2 November showed Banda with 40% of the vote against 38% for Sata. Sata subsequently stated that he had not been defeated and accused Banda of fraud.

== Presidency ==
Sata ran for President for a fourth time in the election held on 20 September 2011. In the early stages of the campaign he was more vitriolic in his anti-Chinese rhetoric, but he later toned down his rhetoric. Results showed him receiving about 43% of the vote against 36% for Banda, and Chief Justice Ernest Sakala accordingly declared that he had won the election in the early hours of 23 September. He was sworn in later in the day.

Sata decided that Zambia needed to add more districts to the existing 72 districts and declared that existing districts needed to be subdivided into multiple districts for the purposes of decentralization. He also created Muchinga Province in October 2011 by subdividing Northern Province, bringing the national province count to 10. He also renamed the three main airports in Zambia (Lusaka; Ndola; Livingstone) after politicians from Zambia's first administration.

=== Policies ===
On 8 September 2008, Sata claimed that he would protect Chinese investments if he was elected, abandoning the hostility towards Chinese investment that he had expressed during the 2006 presidential election campaign.

During the 2006 election campaign he was reported to have said of Zimbabwean President Robert Mugabe that "Mugabe hasn't done anything wrong. It is the imperialists, the capitalist-roaders, who say he is a villain."

In 2008, he said that he would revoke licenses for foreign investors if they resisted his orders to give at least a 25% stake in their companies to Zambians.

At his inauguration as President of Zambia, Sata assured foreign investors that they were welcome in his country, Africa's biggest copper producer, but said they must improve conditions for their Zambian employees.

== Personal life ==
Sata's first marriage was to Margaret Manda. He later married Christine Kaseba, who was First Lady of Zambia during his presidency. Michael Sata reportedly had at least ten children between his two marriages.

In 2016, Sata's widow, Christine Kaseba, denied claims by another woman that she too had also been married to Michael Sata as well as herself.

Michael Sata had a Bachelor's degree in Political Science from Atlantic International University, an unaccredited distance learning university in Honolulu, Hawaii, that has widely been described as a diploma mill.

== Illness and death ==
Concerns about Sata's health grew during 2014 and some suggested that he was no longer really running the government due to his condition, although the government denied that. He stopped appearing in public, which seemed jarringly uncharacteristic for the notably extroverted and outspoken president. Observers thought he seemed unwell when he opened parliament on 19 September and over the course of the following month he failed to appear in public again. MMD leader Nevers Mumba alleged that the government was lying about Sata's health. He also missed a speech at the general debate of the sixty-ninth session of the United Nations General Assembly amid rumours he had fallen ill at a New York City hotel.

On 19 October, he left the country for what was described as a medical check-up, leaving Edgar Lungu, the Minister of Defence, in charge of the country in his absence. Given the circumstances, including the sudden nature of the trip, Sata's absence from public view and the fact that the fiftieth anniversary of Zambian independence was only days away, many believed that Sata was very seriously ill.

Sata died in the late evening of 28 October at the King Edward VII's Hospital in London. He was receiving treatment for an undisclosed illness. Cabinet Secretary Roland Msiska issued a statement that he died late in the day. "As you are aware the president was receiving medical attention in London. The head of state passed on 28 October. President Sata's demise is deeply regretted. The nation will be kept informed on burial arrangements." His wife, Christine Kaseba, and son Mulenga were with him at the time of his death. He is the second President of Zambia to die in office, after Levy Mwanawasa's death only six years earlier in 2008.

His death triggered a presidential by-election in 2015. Vice President Guy Scott, who was named acting president in the interim, was ineligible to run as neither of his parents were born in Zambia.

== Electoral history ==
Electoral history of Michael Sata
Year	Office	Party	Votes received				Result
Year	Office	Party	Total	%	P.	Swing	Result
2001	President of Zambia	PF	59,172	3.40%	7th	—N/a	Lost
2006	President of Zambia	PF	804,748	29.37%	2nd	+25.97	Lost
2008	President of Zambia	PF	683,150	38.64%	2nd	+9.27	Lost
2011	President of Zambia	PF	1,170,966	42.85%	1st	+4.21	Won

Political offices
Preceded by Rupiah Banda	President of Zambia; 2011–2014	Succeeded by Guy Scott; Acting
