= President of Zambia =

Head of state and government

President of the Republic of Zambia
- Public Seal of Zambia

- Presidential flag

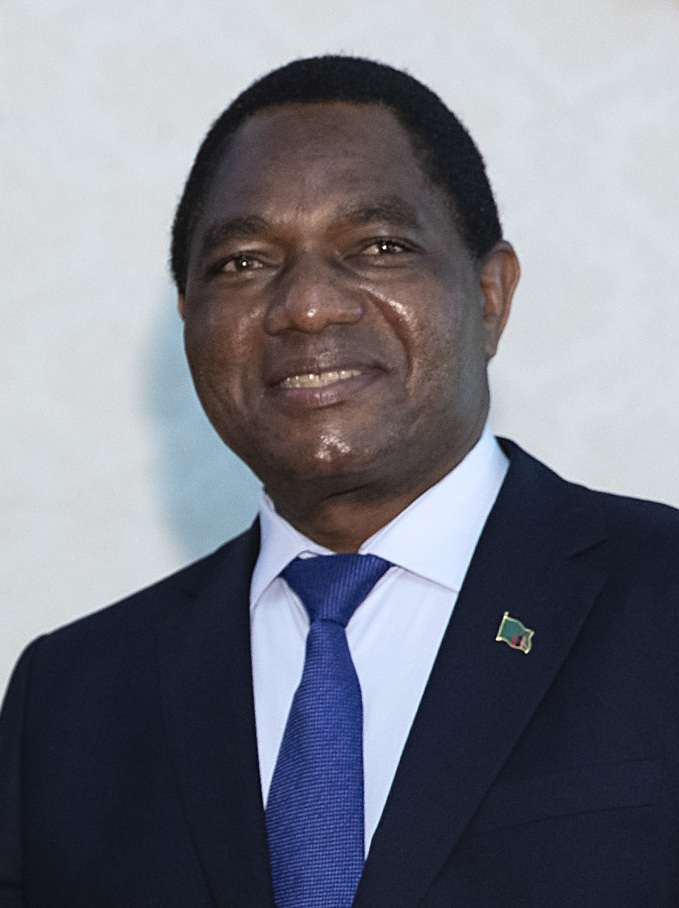
- Incumbent; Hakainde Hichilema since 24 August 2021
- Type: Head of state; Head of government
- Residence: State House, Lusaka
- Term length: Five years, renewable once
- Constituting instrument: Constitution of Zambia (1991)
- Precursor: Prime Minister (as head of government)
- Formation: 24 October 1964; 62 years ago
- First holder: Kenneth Kaunda
- Deputy: Vice President of Zambia
- Salary: ZMW 1,280,299 / US$63,100 annually
- Website: Official website

The president of the Republic of Zambia is the head of state and head of government of Zambia and is the highest executive authority in the country. The president is elected by popular vote for a five-year term and is responsible for the administration of the government, overseeing the implementation of national policies, and representing Zambia in international affairs. The office was established at Zambia's independence in 1964. The current president is Hakainde Hichilema, who assumed office on August 24, 2021, following the 2021 presidential election where his party, the United Party for National Development, won a majority. The president's role includes appointing the Cabinet, serving as Commander-in-Chief of the Zambian Defence Force, and ensuring the enforcement of laws.

The office was first held by Kenneth Kaunda following independence in 1964. Since 1991, when Kaunda left the presidency, the office has been held by six others: Frederick Chiluba, Levy Mwanawasa, Rupiah Banda, Michael Sata, Edgar Lungu and the current president Hakainde Hichilema. In addition, acting president Guy Scott served in an interim capacity after the death of President Michael Sata.

Since 31 August 1991 the president is also the head of government, as the position of Prime Minister was abolished in the last months of Kaunda's presidential term following negotiations with opposition parties.

== Presidential term ==
The president is elected for a term of five years. Since 1991, the Constitution of Zambia has provided a two-term limit for the presidency. There was an attempt to modify the term limits in 2001 for Chiluba, but it did not materialize.

== History ==
=== Northern Rhodesia ===
When the British colony of Northern Rhodesia was separated from Southern Rhodesia and British South Africa Company rule, the head of state was the British Monarch represented in the colony by the Governor of Northern Rhodesia who exercised executive power as head of state and government. In the 1964 Northern Rhodesian general election, the office of Prime Minister of Northern Rhodesia was created to become the head of government ahead of independence. On 19 May 1964, the Secretary of State for Commonwealth Relations Duncan Sandys announced that Northern Rhodesia would become independent under a president. The election for the first president would be held by secret ballot amongst the elected members of the Legislative Council.

=== Zambia ===
Upon independence and the renaming of the country as Zambia, Prime Minister Kenneth Kaunda was elected as the first president. The office of prime minister was also abolished, making the presidency an executive post. Initially, the country would be governed as a multi-party democracy. However, following the Zambian African National Congress (ZANC) integrating with United National Independence Party (UNIP), President Kaunda announced that the Constitution of Zambia would be changed to turn the country into a one-party state in 1973 with UNIP as the only legal party with all others banned. Kaunda claimed this was done to discourage tribalism. However, the constitution also restored the office of prime minister as head of government. In the 1973 Zambian general election, voters were only able to vote for the UNIP sponsored Kaunda and their only options were to vote if they approved or rejected his candidacy.

Kaunda was re-elected unanimously at each election until 1991. During the 1980s, pressures increased for the multi-party ban to be rescinded. After negotiations with the Movement for Multi-Party Democracy (MMD) in 1990, President Kaunda signed a constitutional amendment legalising political parties other than UNIP. The office of prime minister was abolished again and the powers returned to the president. In the 1991 Zambian general election, Kaunda was defeated by the MMD's Chiluba. Kaunda agreed to hand over the presidency peacefully, becoming the second African leader to do so after Mathieu Kérékou of Benin.

In 1996, President Chiluba allegedly discovered a plot by members of UNIP to carry out a coup d'état and declared a state of emergency to arrest UNIP members. However the Supreme Court of Zambia declared the emergency declaration was not valid and lifted the state of emergency and released those arrested. Later in the year, Chiluba amended the constitution stating that only people who had one parent born in Zambia or Northern Rhodesia could run for president. This amendment was ostensibly targeted at blocking Kaunda from standing for president again as his parents had been born in Nyasaland (modern day Malawi).

Due to a two-term limit in the constitution, Levy Mwanawasa was selected by Chiluba as the MMD's candidate to succeed him. Mwanawasa won the 2001 Zambian general election but his victory was marred by accusations of electoral fraud by opposition parties. Following legal disputes, the Supreme Court eventually ruled in 2005 that though the poll was "flawed", there were not enough errors to justify overturning the result. Mwanawasa won re-election in 2006. He died in 2008 and was replaced by Rupiah Banda. In the 2011 Zambian general election Rupiah was defeated by the Patriotic Front's (PF) Michael Sata.

Sata died in office in 2014. Accordingly, his Vice-President Guy Scott became president in an acting capacity. This made Scott the first white head of state of an African country since South Africa's F. W. de Klerk who left office in 1994 following the end of apartheid. However, because his parents were not born in Zambia, due to the constitution he was only able to act as president for 90 days and could not stand for election. At the 2015 Zambian presidential election, the PF's Edgar Lungu won the presidency and retained it a year later in the 2016 Zambian general election under the amended constitution. In the 2021 Zambian general election, the United Party for National Development's (UPND) Hakainde Hichilema defeated Lungu.

There are four most notable changes affecting the presidency in this amendment assented to by Lungu in January 2016, most of which are found in Part VII(7) of the constitution . Firstly, Article 100 Section 1 a) effectively removal the parental clause requiring presidential and vice presidential candidates to have at least one parent born in Zambia and the harmonisation of Presidential and Vice-presidential eligibility in Article 110 Section 2. Secondly, Article 101 Sections 1, 2 3 (a & b) and 8 signalled the shift from a first-past-the-post system to a two-round system in which over 50% of valid votes cast are required for a president to win. In the event that this does not happen a second round will be held within 37 days between the two leading candidates to which the 50% + 1 rule will determine the winner on that second round. The third notable change is in the introduction of the running mate clause in Article 110 Sections 1, 2 and 3. This saw the President and Vice President directly elected on the same ticket as opposed to before where the President who once elected appoints and dismisses the vice president executively. Lastly, the fourth change was in Article 100 Section 1 j) which requires an aspiring presidential candidates to prove to have at least 100 registered voters in each of the ten provinces to successfully file for nominations with the Electoral Commission of Zambia. In 2020, Lungu attempted to change the constitution to allow the President to change electoral laws and take control of Zambia's monetary policy. However the controversial Bill 10 failed after the Parliament of Zambia did not vote in favour with the required 2/3 majority.

== List of officeholders ==
Political parties

United National Independence Party (UNIP)
Movement for Multi-Party Democracy (MMD)
Patriotic Front (PF)
United Party for National Development (UPND)

Status

Denotes acting president

Symbols

^{§} Elected unopposed

No.	Portrait	Name (Birth–Death)	Term of office			Political party	Elected	Cabinet(s)	Ref.
No.	Portrait	Name (Birth–Death)	Took office	Left office	Time in office	Political party	Elected	Cabinet(s)	Ref.
1		Kenneth Kaunda (1924–2021)	24 October 1964	2 November 1991	27 years, 9 days	UNIP	—		
1		Kenneth Kaunda (1924–2021)	24 October 1964	2 November 1991	27 years, 9 days	UNIP	1968		
1		Kenneth Kaunda (1924–2021)	24 October 1964	2 November 1991	27 years, 9 days	UNIP	1973^{[§]}	—N/a	
1		Kenneth Kaunda (1924–2021)	24 October 1964	2 November 1991	27 years, 9 days	UNIP	1978^{[§]}	—N/a	
1		Kenneth Kaunda (1924–2021)	24 October 1964	2 November 1991	27 years, 9 days	UNIP	1983^{[§]}	—N/a	
1		Kenneth Kaunda (1924–2021)	24 October 1964	2 November 1991	27 years, 9 days	UNIP	1988^{[§]}	—N/a	
2		Frederick Chiluba (1943–2011)	2 November 1991	2 January 2002	10 years, 61 days	MMD	1991	Chiluba I	
2		Frederick Chiluba (1943–2011)	2 November 1991	2 January 2002	10 years, 61 days	MMD	1996	Chiluba II	
3		Levy Mwanawasa (1948–2008)	2 January 2002	19 August 2008 #	6 years, 230 days	MMD	2001	Mwanawasa I	
3		Levy Mwanawasa (1948–2008)	2 January 2002	19 August 2008 #	6 years, 230 days	MMD	2006	Mwanawasa II	
—		Rupiah Banda (1937–2022)	19 August 2008	2 November 2008	75 days	MMD	—	Mwanawasa II	
4		Rupiah Banda (1937–2022)	2 November 2008	23 September 2011	2 years, 325 days	MMD	2008	Banda	
5		Michael Sata (1937–2014)	23 September 2011	28 October 2014 #	3 years, 35 days	PF	2011	Sata	
—		Guy Scott (1944–2026) acting	28 October 2014	25 January 2015	89 days	PF	—	Sata	
6		Edgar Lungu (1956–2025)	25 January 2015	24 August 2021	6 years, 211 days	PF	2015	Lungu I	
6		Edgar Lungu (1956–2025)	25 January 2015	24 August 2021	6 years, 211 days	PF	2016	Lungu II	
7		Hakainde Hichilema (born 1962)	24 August 2021	Incumbent	5 years, 77 days	UPND	2021	Hichilema I	
7		Hakainde Hichilema (born 1962)	24 August 2021	Incumbent	5 years, 77 days	UPND	2026	Hichilema II	

== Rank by time in office ==
Rank	President	Time in office
1	Kenneth Kaunda	27 years, 9 days
2	Frederick Chiluba	10 years, 61 days
3	Levy Mwanawasa	6 years, 230 days
4	Edgar Lungu	6 years, 211 days
5	Hakainde Hichilema	5 years, 77 days
6	Michael Sata	3 years, 35 days
7	Rupiah Banda	2 years, 325 days
—	Guy Scott	89 days (acting)
—	Rupiah Banda	75 days (acting)

== See also ==
- First Lady of Zambia
- Vice President of Zambia
- Governor of Northern Rhodesia
- Prime Minister of Zambia
- Lists of office-holders
- List of current heads of state and government
