= Monze (disambiguation) =

Monze is a town in Zambia.

Monze may also refer to:

- Monze, Aude, a commune in France
- Monze District, a district in Zambia
- Monze (constituency), a constituency of the National Assembly of Zambia
- Roman Catholic Diocese of Monze, a diocese in Zambia
- Ras Muari or Cape Monze, a beach in Karachi, Pakistan

== People ==
- Lily Monze, Zambian politician
- Chief Monze, spiritual leader of the Tonga people of Zambia
