= Fred M'membe =

Zambian journalist

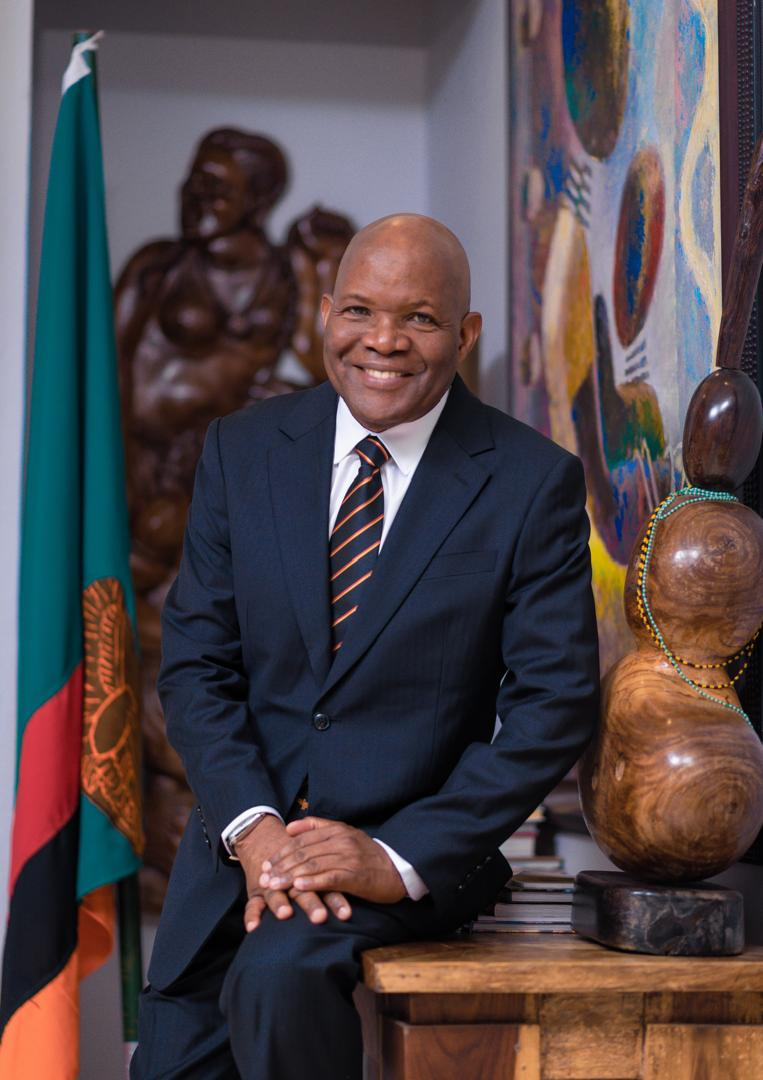
- M'membe in 2024
- Born: 11 March 1959 (age 67); Mongu, Barotseland
- Education: The Copperbelt University, Dip., University of Zambia, LLB, MA, PhD
- Occupations: Journalist, politician
- Organization: Zambia Post
- Political party: Socialist Party
- Spouse: Mutinta Mazoka
- Awards: MISA's Press Freedom Award (1995); International Press Freedom Award (1995); World Press Freedom Hero (2000)

Fred M'membe (born 11 March 1959) is a Zambian journalist known for his editorship of the Zambia Post. He has received numerous international awards for his reporting. In 2000, the International Press Institute named him one of its World Press Freedom Heroes.

== Background ==
M'membe was born in Mongu, Barotseland, on 11 March 1959. He went to St John's Secondary School, where he did his junior secondary, and later went to St Francis in Malole, where he completed his senior secondary. He studied accounting at the Copperbelt University. He worked for a time as an accountant before moving into journalism in November 1990. He is also a qualified member of the Association of Chartered Certified Accountants (ACCA) and has a Master in Economic Policy and Planning from the University of Zambia. He also holds a law degree from the University of Zambia and is an advocate of the High Court and Supreme Court of Zambia.

He met Mike Hall, a Malawi-born journalist who covered Southern Africa for the BBC and UK and US newspapers. At the time, Zambia had only two newspapers, both of them controlled by the government of Kenneth Kaunda, and the pair felt that an independent news source was long overdue. With Hall's help, M'membe went on to found Post Newspapers Limited in 1991, as well as a printing company, Independent Printers Limited, which would be responsible for printing The Zambia Post, Post Newspapers' flagship publication. The pair modelled the paper's design on South Africa's liberal Weekly Mail and Lisbon, Portugal's daily Público. Despite a modest circulation of 40,000 and Zambia's "anemic" economy, the paper quickly proved a financial success.

== Chiluba era ==
As the only independent newspaper in Zambia, The Post has frequently come into conflict with the government. In the first ten years of its existence alone, it was the target of more than fifty criminal and civil suits. Though the paper supported Frederick Chiluba's Movement for Multi-Party Democracy (MMD) in the 1991 election that ousted Kenneth Kaunda and won Chiluba the presidency, M'membe soon became critical of what he perceived as Chiluba's failure to live up to his campaign promises.

Ahead of the 1996 general election, Chiluba's government increased its efforts to restrict independent media. On 5 February 1996, The Post reported the MMD's plans to hold a referendum on constitutional changes. Chiluba's government banned the edition and charged M'membe, managing editor Bright Mwape, and special projects editor Masautso Phiri with possession of a banned publication and state secrets, causing the three to go into hiding for several weeks to avoid arrest. M'membe and Mwape surrendered to authorities in March and were sentenced to 24 days in a maximum security prison on charges of contempt of Parliament. The charges were protested by the Committee to Protect Journalists, which launched a letter-writing campaign to secure the pair's release.

In 1999, M'membe and ten members of his staff were charged with espionage following a Post article that stated that Zambia was unprepared to withstand a possible military attack from Angola. The newspaper's offices were also surrounded by police to prevent further publishing. M'membe's co-defendants were acquitted by the Lusaka High Court on 18 August 2000, though the judge ruled that M'membe himself still had to answer the case. He was acquitted in December of the same year.

In August 2001, M'membe was arrested again following an article in which he accused Chiluba of embezzlement. The article began, "It's very difficult to avoid calling President Frederick Chiluba a thief, because he is a thief. How else can one describe a person who steals?" M'membe was charged with defaming the president, charges The New York Times described as "efforts to muzzle the press" ahead of impending elections.

== Post-Chiluba period ==
Though Chiluba was barred by the Constitution of Zambia from seeking a third term, he was succeeded by his former vice-president and fellow MMD member Levy Mwanawasa. M'membe soon found himself in conflict with Mwanawasa as he had been with Chiluba, and was arrested on 12 February 2002 on defamation charges following publication of an article in which he quoted opposition lawmaker Dipak Patel as calling Mwanawasa a "cabbage", an apparent reference to Mwanawasa's condition following a serious traffic accident that left him with slurred speech. M'membe stated that he believed the charges to be "politically motivated", and that Patel (who was also issued a summons) was their primary target.

During a June 2009 hospital strike, Post News Editor Chansa Kabwela forwarded to Vice-president George Kunda pictures that had been given to the newspaper of a woman giving birth in the street, which she felt were important to share but too graphic to publish. The following month, she was arrested on a charge of "distributing obscene materials in order to corrupt the morals of society". The charges against her were dismissed by a judge in November 2009, but after M'membe published an op-ed piece from a Zambian lawyer living abroad in Kabwela's support, he was charged with contempt of court. He was convicted in June 2010 and sentenced to four months' hard labour.

In July 2011, M'membe again faced a charge of contempt of court for defying a ban not to print "libelous" articles about presidential candidate (later president) Rupiah Banda.

On 1 November 2016, the Post newspaper was placed under provisional liquidation after five former employees applied to court to have the company placed on liquidation in order to recover their terminal benefits. According to documents filed in court, the five former employees did not give the Post the statutory 21-day notice before a petition for liquidation can be filed. Documents filed in Court also show that an offer was made by M'membe to pay the monies demanded by the former employees into court, which offer had not been accepted.

The Zambia Revenue Authority in June 2016 closed the Post, claiming that it had unpaid taxes. On 14 February 2017, the Magistrate's Court of Zambia issued an arrest warrant to the Zambia Police Service to arrest Fred M'membe and his lawyer Nchima Nchito for alleged "impersonation" for fighting to save the Post. Nchima's arrest warrant was quashed by the Court on 28 February 2017 after he surrendered himself. As police reached Mr. M'membe's residence, he was absent and only his wife (Mutinta Mazoka, daughter of the late UPND leader Anderson Mazoka) was present. She was arrested and charged with attempting to prevent the arrest of her husband, but was acquitted the following year. She was previously arrested in connection with her and M'membe's journalistic work in 2016. She is the proprietor of The Mast newspaper, which many regard as a newspaper launched to continue the work of The Post.

== Presidential campaign ==
In 2018, M'membe founded the Socialist Party, splitting off from the Rainbow Party. He is currently the party's president and was its candidate for president in both the 2021 Zambian general election and the 2026 Zambian general election.

== Personal life ==
M'membe is married to Mutinta Mazoka, a politician, newspaper owner, and the daughter of United Party for National Development founder Anderson Mazoka.

== Recognition ==
M'membe was the third recipient of the Media Institute of Southern Africa's Press Freedom Award in 1995. MISA described him as "the most persecuted journalist in his country and the rest of the region." Previous awardees include Onesimo Makani Kabweza and Basildon Peta.

In 1995, M'membe won the International Press Freedom Award of the Committee to Protect Journalists, "an annual recognition of courageous journalism".

In 2000, he was selected by the International Press Institute as one of 50 "World Press Freedom Heroes" of the organisation's fifty years of existence.
