= Monze East =

National Assembly constituency in Zambia

Monze East is a constituency of the National Assembly of Zambia. It was created in 2026 by splitting Monze constituency. It covers the southern and eastern part of Monze in Monze District, including Chisekesi and Rusangu.

== List of MPs ==
Election year	MP	Party
2026	Jacob Mwiimbu	United Party for National Development
