= Mutinta Mazoka =

Zambian entrepreneur

- Born: 1977 (age 48–49)
- Citizenship: Zambia
- Education: Syracuse University
- Occupation: Entrepreneur

Mutinta Buumba Mazoka M'membe (born c. 1977) is a Zambian newspaper owner and politician. She owns the independent publication The Mast.

== Biography ==
Mutinta Mazoka was born c. 1977. Her parents are the late politician Anderson Mazoka and Mutinta C. Mazoka, a former member of the National Assembly of Zambia.

Mazoka studied political science at Syracuse University, then worked for the National Democratic Institute for International Affairs in Washington, D.C., before attending graduate school at the American InterContinental University, graduating with an MBA. She went on to work in finance, with nonprofits, and on entrepreneurial ventures

She then became the publisher of The Mast, an independent newspaper in Zambia that was launched to continue the work of the shuttered Post.

Mazoka was a longtime member of the United Party for National Development, which was founded by her father, Anderson Mazoka. In the 2021 Zambian general election, she expressed interest in representing Monze constituency in the assembly, but the party chose Jack Mwiimbu to represent the constituency instead.

Her husband, Fred M'membe, is a Zambian journalist who ran the now-closed Post. In 2021, he ran for president as leader of the Socialist Party. Mazoka, however, chose to remain with the UPND—whose candidate, Hakainde Hichilema, eventually won the presidency—over joining the Socialist Party.

In November 2022, Mazoka resigned from the UPND. She had been a member of the party's National Management Committee at the time.

In February 2017, Mazoka was charged with attempting to prevent the arrest of her husband, but she was acquitted the following year. She was previously arrested in connection with her and M'membe's journalistic work in 2016.
