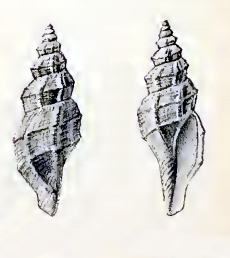
- Original image of a shell of Daphnella tetartemoris

Scientific classification
- Kingdom: Animalia
- Phylum: Mollusca
- Class: Gastropoda
- Subclass: Caenogastropoda
- Order: Neogastropoda
- Superfamily: Conoidea
- Family: Raphitomidae
- Genus: Daphnella
- Species: D. tetartemoris

Binomial name
- Daphnella tetartemoris (Melvill, 1910)

Synonyms
- Mangilia tetartemoris Melvill, 1910

= Daphnella tetartemoris =

Species of gastropod

Daphnella tetartemoris is a species of sea snail, a marine gastropod mollusk in the family Raphitomidae.

== Description ==
The length of the shell attains 8 mm, its diameter 2.5 mm

This is a remarkably graceful, attenuate-fusiform shell. It contains seven whorls, of which three in the protoconch. The shell is conspicuous for its strong yet thread-like angled keels, one upon the upper whorls, two on the lower, while a rectangular appearance is obtained by the six longitudinal remote yet regular ribs on each whorl, these not being exactly continuous, as is the case with the sculpture of some Mangiliae. The apical whorls are beautifully cancellate. The colour of the remainder is pale ochreous or straw-colour, slightly intensified on the ribs. The spiral lines crossing the whorls are close and uniform. The sinus is broad, but shallow. The outer lip is thin. The aperture is narrowly oblong. The siphonal canal is slightly prolonged.

It differs from Daphnella omaleyi (Melvill, 1899) in its quadrate sculpture, two acute keels existing on the lower whorls, one on the upper, crossing six remote yet regular ribs. The whorls of the protoconch are delicately decussately cancellate.

== Distribution ==
This species occurs off Astola Island in the Arabian Sea.
