= Manora Point Lighthouse =

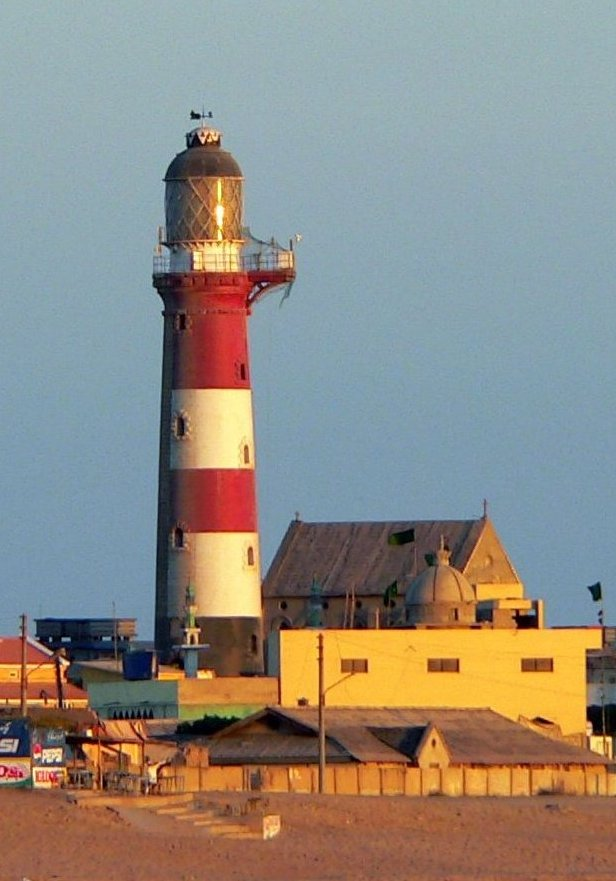
- Manora Point in December 2005
- Location: Manora, Karachi, Pakistan
- Coordinates: 24°47′38″N 66°58′39″E

Tower
- Constructed: 1851
- Height: Tower – 125 ft (38 m)
- Shape: Conical
- Markings: Red and white horizontal bands

Light
- First lit: 1889 (current tower)
- Focal height: 157 ft (48 m)
- Lens: hyperradiant Fresnel lens (1908)
- Range: 26 nmi (48 km; 30 mi)
- Characteristic: Fl W 7.5s

The Manora Point Lighthouse is an active lighthouse located in Manora, Karachi, on the Arabian Sea in Pakistan, where it is fourth tallest lighthouse in the country at a height of 38 metres (125 ft). The lighthouse was first established on the point in 1851, being second oldest light station in the former British Indian Empire.

Extensively rebuilt in 1889, it still remains operational today as a navigational aid for ships entering the nearby Port of Karachi. The conical masonry tower, with a lantern and gallery, has a daymark on the seaward side of the lighthouse of horizontal bands of red, white and black.

In 1908, the lighthouse was improved with the installation of a hyperradiant Fresnel lens manufactured by the English company Chance Brothers. The management of the lighthouse is undertaken by the Karachi Port Trust and although the site is open to the public the island is itself a restricted zone due to it being surrounded by Pakistan Navy bases. Although the lighthouse is listed as a heritage monument, there is no public access to the tower.

== Construction ==
Karachi, the former capital of Pakistan, is the largest city and main commercial centre of the country and the capital of Sindh province as a port on the Arabian Sea northwest of the mouth of the Indus. Although its history of a port is little known prior to the 18th century, the port it is believed to be ancient. The British captured Manora in 1839 and made it their initial base of operations in what is now Pakistan. However, it remained modestly sized until the British conquest of Sindh in 1843 when the port developed as a vital centre to support cotton exports. Manora, a bluff rocky headland, projecting in a south-eastward direction from the mainland, and leaving a space of about two miles between the extreme point and the coast to the east. In the harbour and within the entrance are some rocky islets, which are seen from the sea over the low isthmus connecting the point of Manora with the coast to the west.

Although a light on the Manora Breakwater had been displayed since 1848, increased traffic to the port meant that there was a need for a permanent lighthouse to be established, so "The British constructed a lighthouse as part of their fortifications at Manora Point" The lighthouse of 1851 was a 50-foot tower standing at an elevation of 119 feet above sea level and was visible for 15 to 16 miles. The area was known for having strong north-easterly winds between November and March with gales in January from the west-southwest and very irregular tides. During the Southwest monsoon, it was advised that vessels avoid the point entirely and instead head 18 ½ miles north to Ras Muari. If the weather was particularly bad ships were not to attempt an approach into Karachi Bay. The first lighthouse built in the former British Indian Empire was that of Colaba Point in 1847, near Mumbai although it was demolished and replaced by one on Prong's Reef. Manora Point was the second oldest, completed four years later. The building next to the lighthouse is St. Paul's Church which was built in 1864.

Manora is the Brighton of Karachi—or rather will be—where the inhabitants resort for change of air; it is well adapted for bathing, and is cool and pleasant from its vicinity to the sea...Point Manora is a high bluff, on which is the lighthouse, with a good fixed light, visible 16 to 18 miles off; but the whole point is rapidly wasting away, and will in time be only a sandy spit.

— Captain L. Bilton, 1862, Correspondent of the Mercantile Marine Magazine

== 1889 rebuild ==
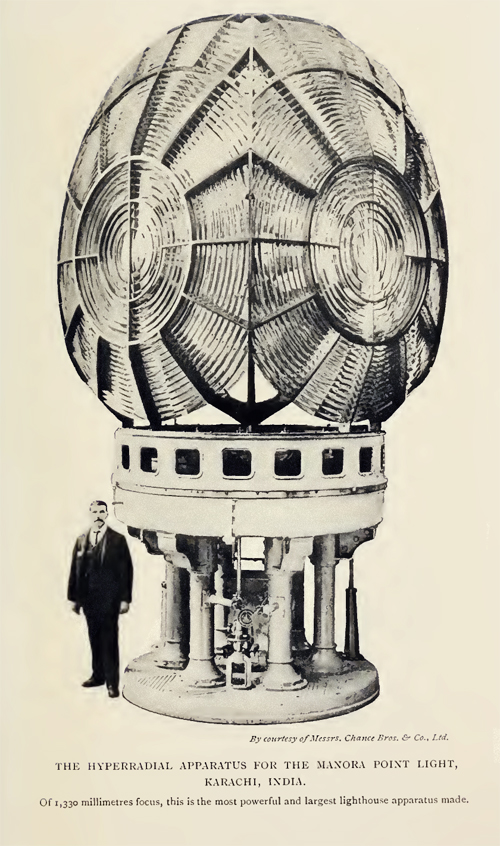
Lens apparatus for the Manora Point Light produced by Chance Brothers and Company

In 1887 designs were proposed for a new lighthouse tower by the Port Engineer's Office. This was part of a series of ongoing improvements to the harbour, as the port had taken on a new level of importance and witnessed a substantial increase in sea traffic, with a constant stream of ships transporting goods and troops to and from the sub-continent.

Completed by 1889, the alterations raised the height to almost double the size of the original lighthouse, with a tower standing 38 m high. The masonry tower was built was a conical shaped with a lantern and gallery. This tower was painted on the seaward side with red and white horizontal bands; the landward facing side was unpainted.

In 1908, a hyperradiant Fresnel lens, produced by the English glassmaking company Chance Brothers, was installed in the tower. Chance Brothers Ltd was one of the major suppliers of lighthouse optical systems in the world, and the only company of its kind in Britain. The hyper-radial is the largest type of lens used for lighthouses, having an internal diameter of 2.66 m (8.7 ft). Made up of four bullseye panels, the "revolving lens unit weighed 6 tons but floated on mercury such that it could be turned with one finger."

The optic produced a "one and a half million candlepower flash every seven and a half seconds". Each flash was created by one of the four bullseye panels set at 90 degrees, as the unit made a complete rotation every 30 seconds. The light has retained this characteristic to the present day, and has a nominal range of 26 nmi (48 km; 30 mi), at a height above sea level or focal plane of 48 m (157 ft).

== Current site ==
The lighthouse is active, and operated by the Karachi Port Trust where it appears on their logo, and is registered under the international Admiralty number D7750 with an NGA identifier of 112–28472. It is listed as a heritage building under the Sindh Cultural Heritage (Preservation) Act 1994. Manora Point is the fourth tallest lighthouses in Pakistan, there are higher towers at Turshian Mouth 45 m (148 ft), Sir Creek at 46 m (151 ft), the tallest being Ras Mauri at 48 m (157 ft).

The site around the light is in a restricted zone due to the proximity of naval bases, and the tower itself is closed and inaccessible. The Pakistan Maritime Museum in Karachi has a replica of the Manora lighthouse where the tower can be climbed, but its dimensions are not the same as the original.

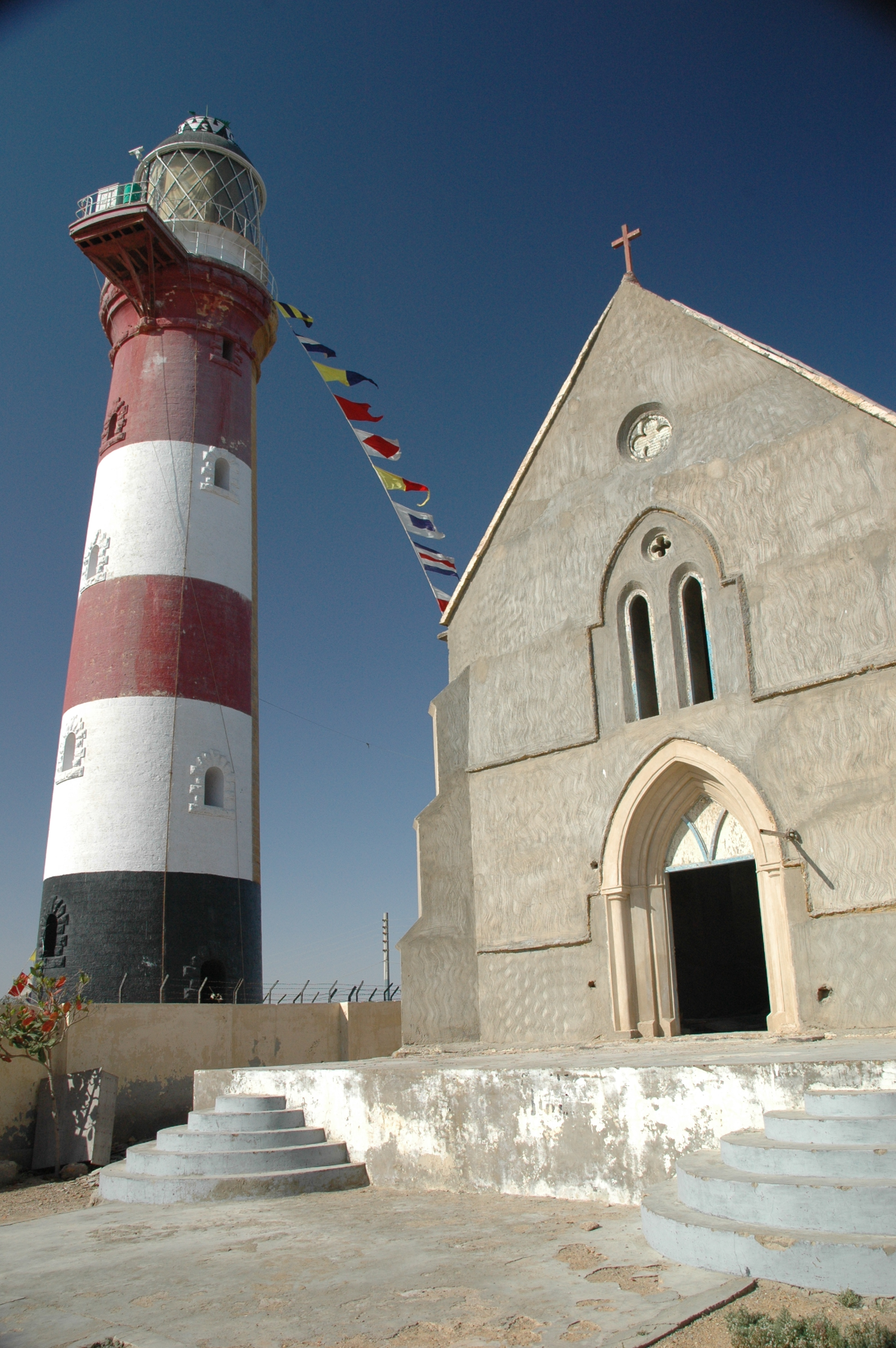
View of lighthouse and St. Paul's Church

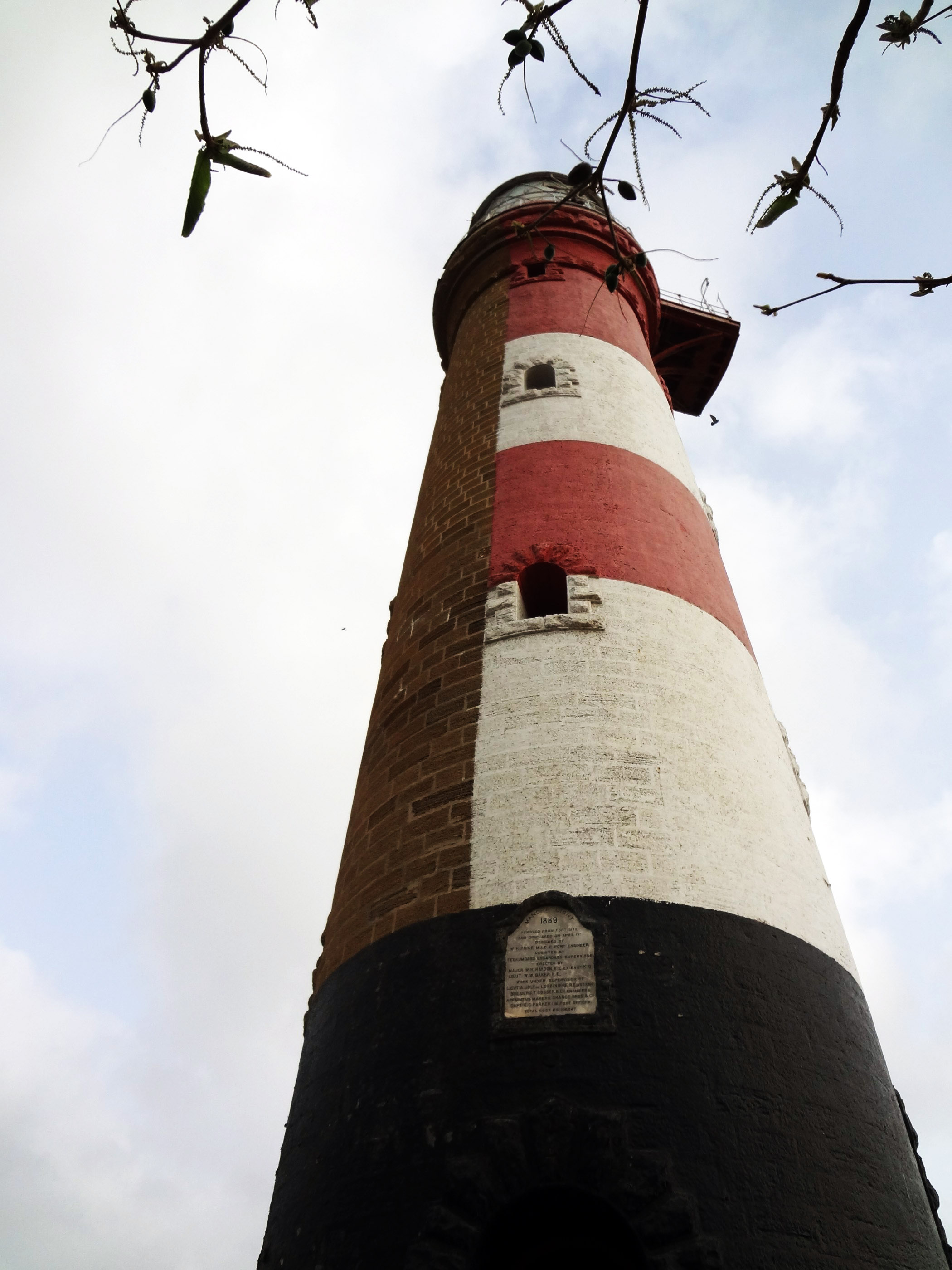
Detail of the tower showing the dividing line between the painted and unpainted areas

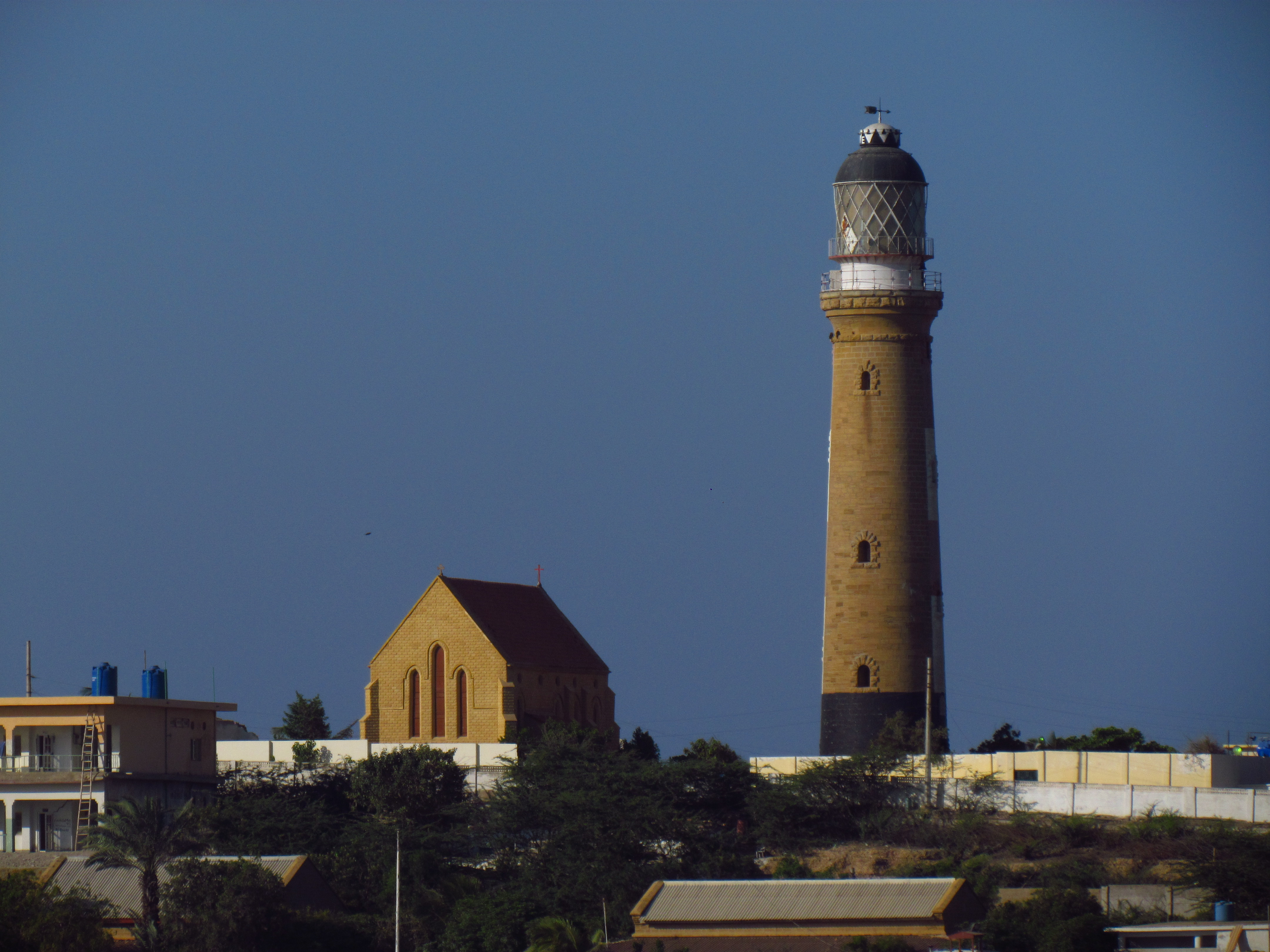
Unpainted landward side

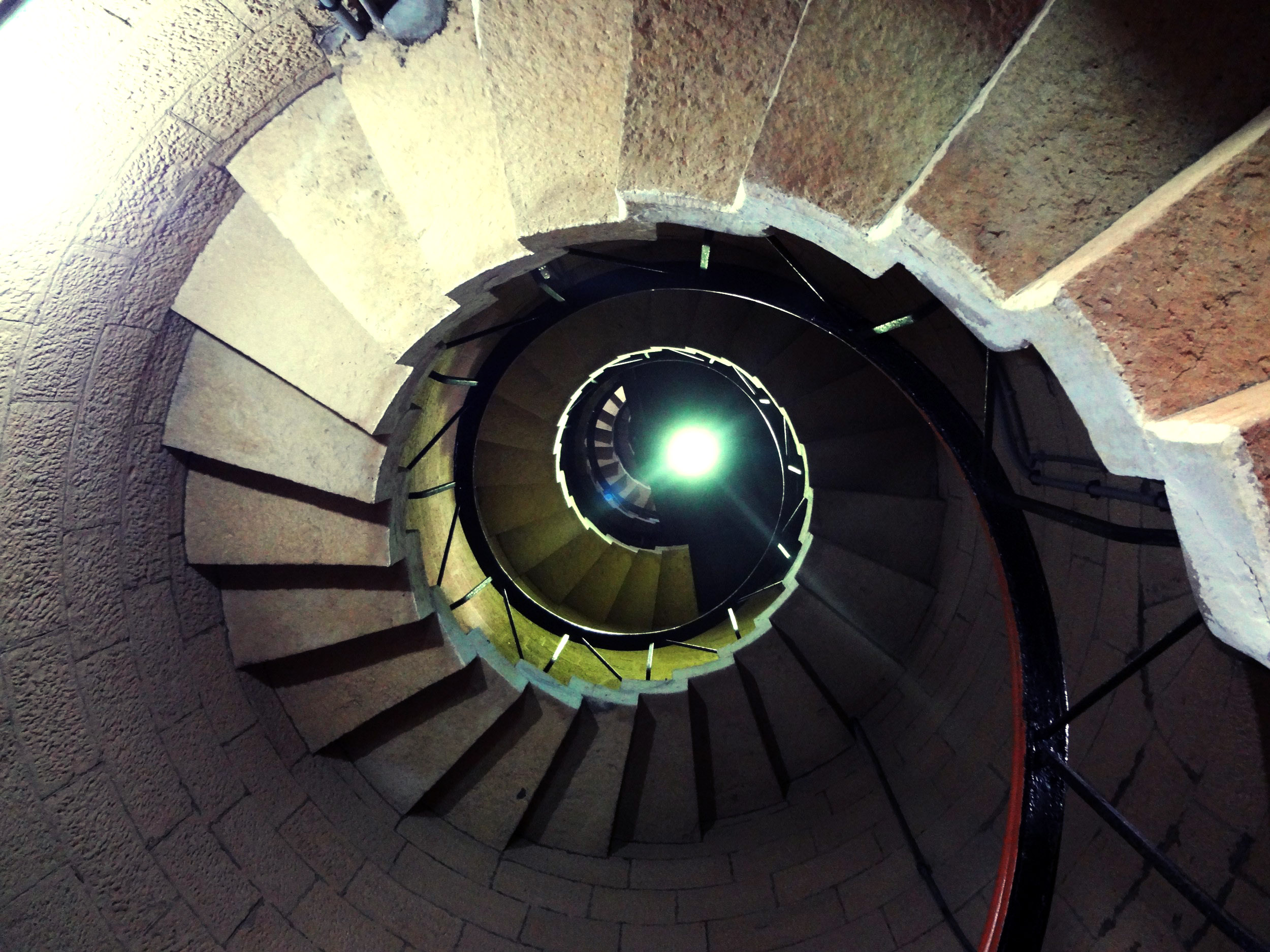
Internal view and spiral staircase

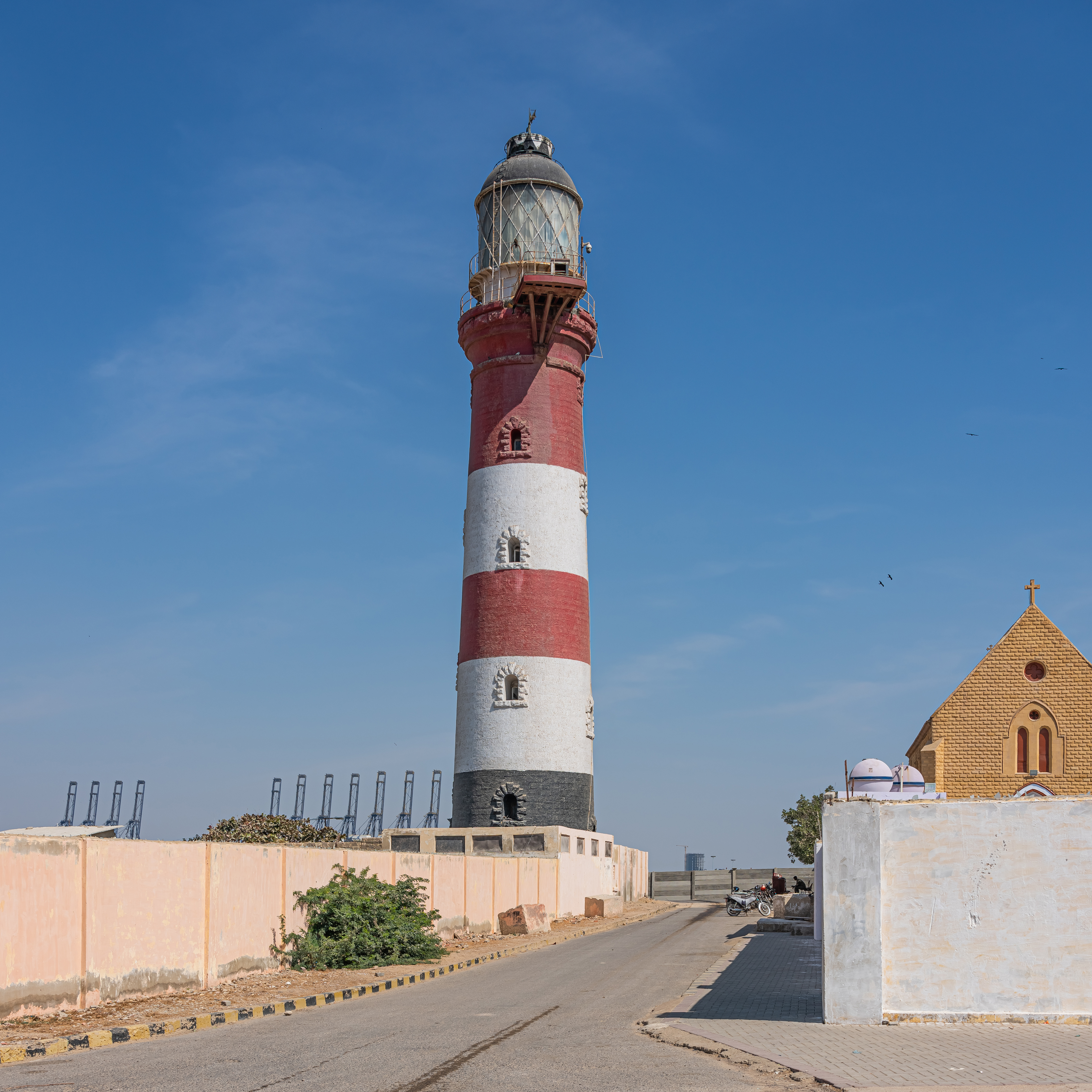
View of the tower showing the size of the lantern room

== See also ==
- List of lighthouses in Pakistan
