= Chansa =

Chansa may refer to:

- Francis Chansa, Congolese football goalkeeper
- Isaac Chansa, Zambian footballer
- Wisdom Mumba Chansa, Zambian footballer
- Chansa Kabwela, Zambian journalist
