= Rock Barn Farm =

Historic farm in North Carolina, United States

- U.S. National Register of Historic Places
- Location within North Carolina Location within the United States
- Location: West side of SR 1709, 0.4 miles (0.64 km) north of the junction with SR 1715, near Claremont, North Carolina
- Coordinates: 35°44′32″N 81°09′39″W
- Area: 18.6 acres (7.5 ha)
- Built: c. 1822, c. 1870
- Architectural style: Greek Revival
- MPS: Catawba County MPS
- NRHP reference No.: 90001036
- Added to NRHP: July 5, 1990

Rock Barn Farm, also known as the Hoke-Roseman Farm, is a historic farm located near Claremont, Catawba County, North Carolina. It has 4 contributing buildings, 2 contributing site and 2 contributing structures. The house was built about 1870, and is a two-story, vernacular Greek Revival style frame farmhouse. Also on the property are the contributing remnant of Island Ford Road, corn crib, car shed, granary, two story bank barn known as the "Rock Barn" (c. 1822), foundation wall, and the farm acreage.

It was added to the National Register of Historic Places in 1990.
