= Jack Mwiimbu =

Zambian politician

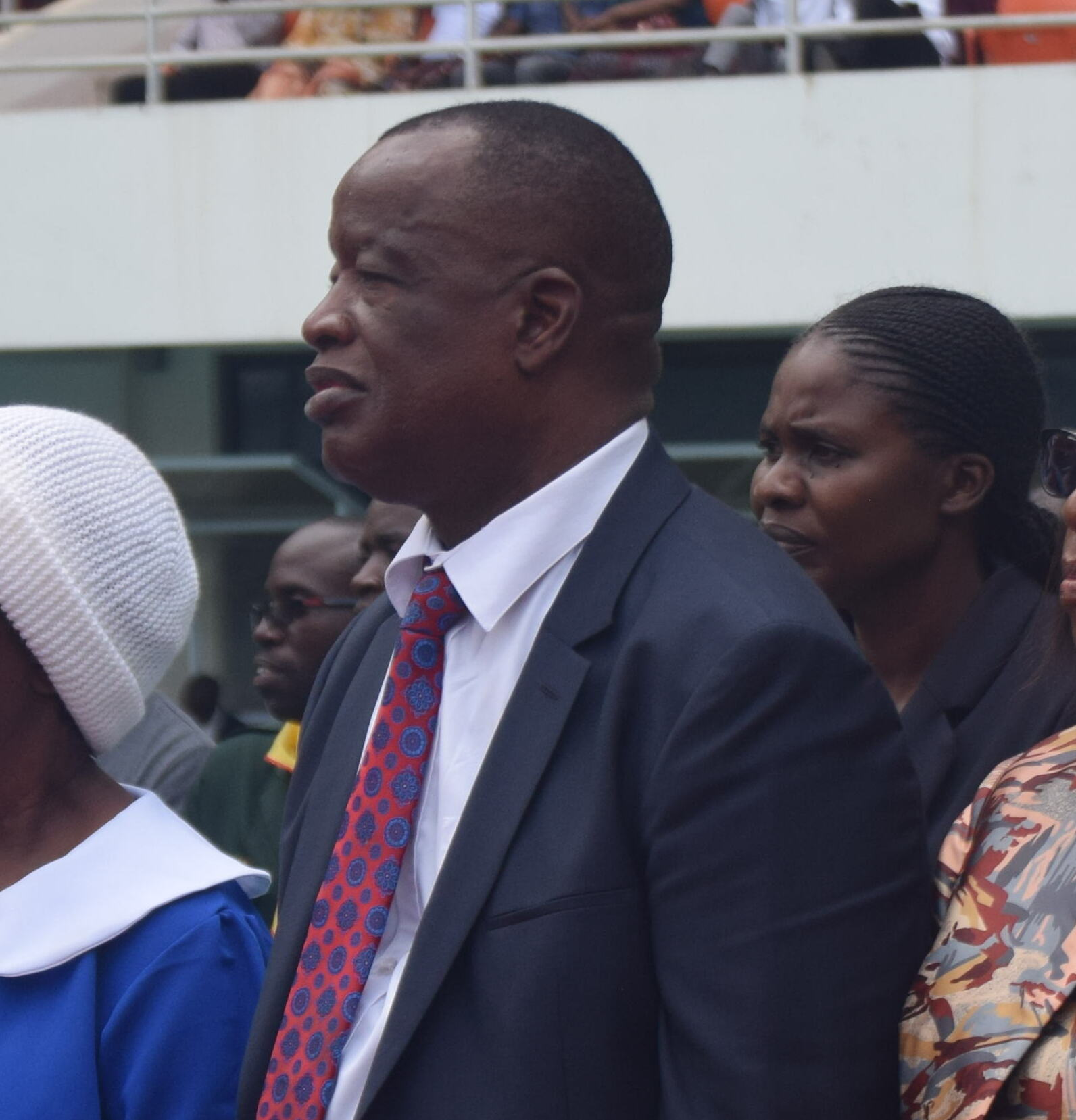
- Jack Mwiimbu in 2023

Minister of Justice
- Incumbent
- Assumed office October 2026
- Preceded by: Princess Kasune

Member of Parliament for Monze East
- Incumbent
- Assumed office August 2026

Minister of Home Affairs and Internal Security
- In office September 2021 – May 2026
- Preceded by: Stephen Kampyongo
- Succeeded by: Clement Andeleki

Member of Parliament for Monze
- In office January 2002 – May 2026
- Preceded by: Suresh Desai
- Succeeded by: Yvonne Shakantu

Personal details
- Born: Jacob Jack Mwiimbu; 23 July 1959 (age 67) Monze, Zambia
- Party: United Party for National Development
- Education: University of Zambia
- Occupation: Politician

Jacob Jack Mwiimbu (born 23 July 1959) is a Zambian lawyer and politician who currently serves as the Minister of Justice and as the Monze East member of parliament. He is a member of the United Party for National Development. He served as the Minister of Home Affairs from September 2021 to May 2026. He was the member of parliament for Monze constituency from 2002 to 2026.

== Background ==
=== Early life and education ===
Mwiimbu was born on July 23, 1959, in Monze, Zambia. He attended Ahmadiyya Primary School and Monze Secondary School, then studied law at the University of Zambia, graduating with a Bachelor of Laws (LLB) degree. He also obtained a Legal Practitioners' Qualifying Examination (LPQE) certificate.

Mwiimbu became a lawyer and later joined the United Party for National Development (UPND).

=== Political career ===
Mwiimbu is a member of the United Party for National Development (UPND) and was elected the Member of Parliament for Monze constituency at the 2001, 2006, 2011, 2016 and 2021 elections as the UPND candidate. He was appointed as the Minister of Home Affairs and Internal Security by President Hakainde Hichilema in September 2021.

In April 2026, Monze constituency was split into two constituencies, namely Monze Central and Monze East. After 25 years as the Monze MP, Mwiimbu decided to stand as the UPND candidate for MP in Monze East at the 2026 general election to happen in August that year. At the election in August 2026, he was elected as the Monze East member of parliament and in October 2026, he was appointed as the Minister of Justice.
