= Claremont, North Carolina =

- City
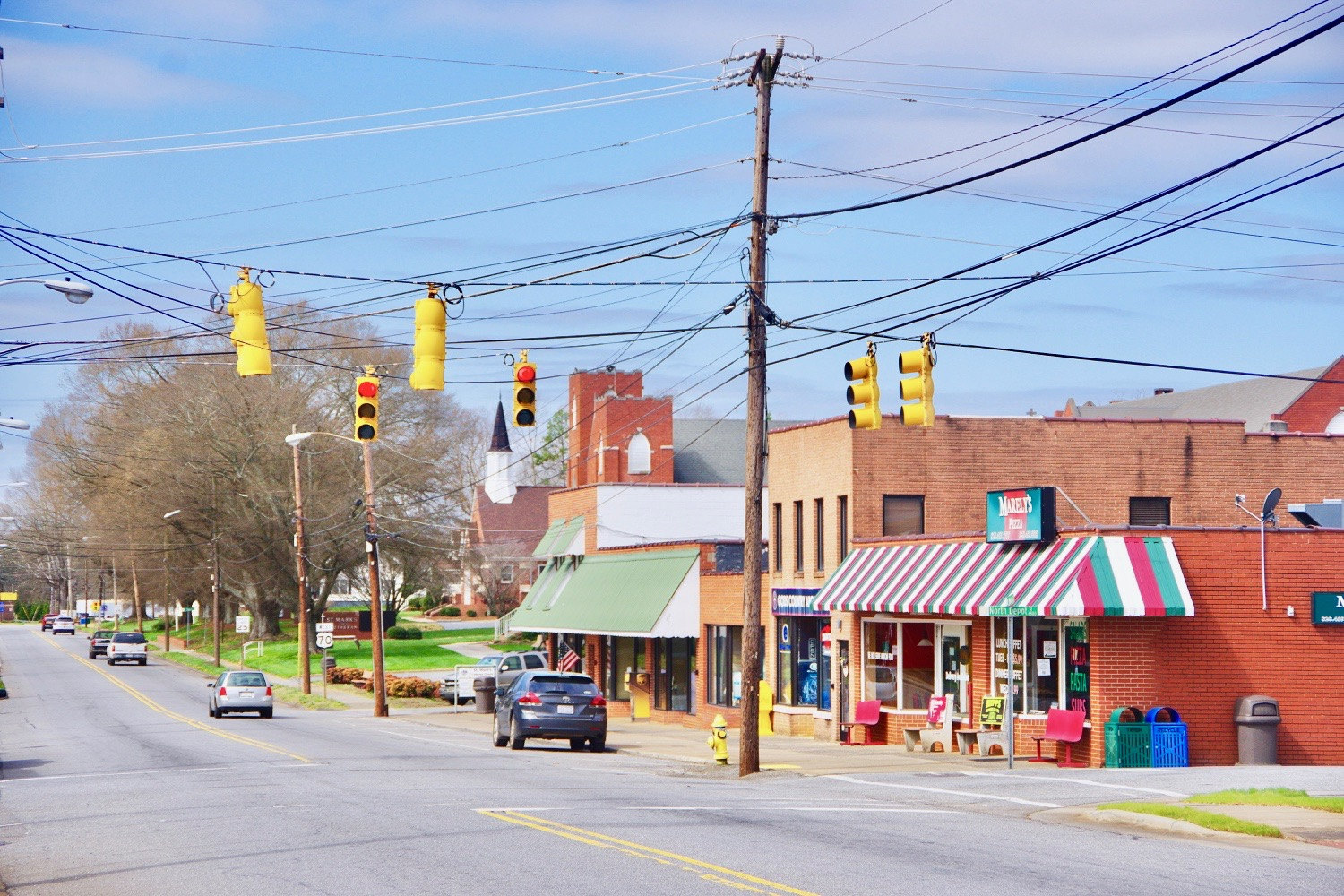
- Main Street (US 70)

- Seal

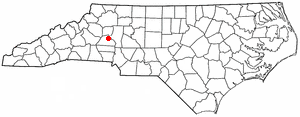
- Location of Claremont, North Carolina
- Coordinates: 35°42′37″N 81°09′11″W
- Country: United States
- State: North Carolina
- County: Catawba

Area
  - Total: 2.85 sq mi (7.38 km^{2})
  - Land: 2.85 sq mi (7.38 km^{2})
  - Water: 0 sq mi (0.00 km^{2})
- Elevation: 961 ft (293 m)

Population (2020)
  - Total: 1,692
  - Density: 594.0/sq mi (229.33/km^{2})
- Time zone: UTC-5 (Eastern (EST))
  - Summer (DST): UTC-4 (EDT)
- ZIP code: 28610
- Area code: 828
- FIPS code: 37-12720
- GNIS feature ID: 2404053
- Website: cityofclaremont.org

Claremont is a city in Catawba County, North Carolina, United States. As of the 2020 census, Claremont had a population of 1,692. It is part of the Hickory–Lenoir–Morganton Metropolitan Statistical Area.

== History ==
Originally known as Charlotte Crossing, and later as Setzer Depot, Claremont began using its current name in 1892. The name is from Clare Sigmon, the daughter of an early settler. The city incorporated in 1893.

In 2023, network infrastructure provider CommScope, moved its company headquarters from nearby Hickory to Claremont. In 2025, CommScope would move its headquarters again, this time to Richardson, Texas.

The Bunker Hill Covered Bridge and Rock Barn Farm are listed on the National Register of Historic Places.

== Geography ==
Claremont is located east of the center of Catawba County. U.S. Route 70 passes through the center of town, leading west 4 miles (6 km) to Conover and east 4 miles (6 km) to Catawba. Interstate 40 passes just north of the town, with access from Exit 135. I-40 leads west 12 miles (19 km) to Hickory and east 16 miles (26 km) to Statesville.

According to the United States Census Bureau, Claremont has a total area of 2.7 square miles (7.1 km^{2}), all land.

== Demographics ==
Historical population
Census	Pop.	Note	%±
1900	160		—
1910	297		85.6%
1920	435		46.5%
1930	368		−15.4%
1940	467		26.9%
1950	669		43.3%
1960	728		8.8%
1970	788		8.2%
1980	880		11.7%
1990	980		11.4%
2000	1,038		5.9%
2010	1,352		30.3%
2020	1,692		25.1%
U.S. Decennial Census

=== 2020 census ===
Claremont racial composition
Race	Number	Percentage
White (non-Hispanic)	1,376	81.32%
Black or African American (non-Hispanic)	113	6.68%
Native American	2	0.12%
Asian	64	3.78%
Pacific Islander	1	0.06%
Other/Mixed	60	3.55%
Hispanic or Latino	76	4.49%

As of the 2020 census, there were 1,692 people and 716 households in the city, including 487 families. The median age was 40.0 years. 23.3% of residents were under the age of 18 and 18.7% were 65 years of age or older. For every 100 females, there were 87.0 males, and for every 100 females age 18 and over, there were 82.8 males age 18 and over.

94.2% of residents lived in urban areas, while 5.8% lived in rural areas.

Of the 716 households, 30.7% had children under the age of 18 living in them. Of all households, 44.3% were married-couple households, 16.8% were households with a male householder and no spouse or partner present, and 32.5% were households with a female householder and no spouse or partner present. About 29.7% of all households were made up of individuals, and 13.6% had someone living alone who was 65 years of age or older.

There were 774 housing units, of which 7.5% were vacant. The homeowner vacancy rate was 1.4% and the rental vacancy rate was 9.5%.

=== 2010 census ===
As of the census of 2010, there were 1,355 people, 456 households, and 300 families residing in the city. The population density was 542.0 inhabitants per square mile (209.3/km^{2}). There were 492 housing units at an average density of 196.3 per square mile (75.8/km^{2}). The racial makeup of the city was 95.66% White, 2.22% African American, 0.10% Native American, 0.87% Asian, 0.67% from other races, and 0.48% from two or more races. Hispanic or Latino of any race were 2.99% of the population.

There were 456 households, out of which 27.2% had children under the age of 18 living with them, 55.3% were married couples living together, 8.1% had a female householder with no husband present, and 34.0% were non-families. 28.5% of all households were made up of individuals, and 12.9% had someone living alone who was 65 years of age or older. The average household size was 2.28 and the average family size was 2.79.

In the city, the population was spread out, with 20.2% under the age of 18, 8.9% from 18 to 24, 31.6% from 25 to 44, 25.9% from 45 to 64, and 13.4% who were 65 years of age or older. The median age was 38 years. For every 100 females, there were 97.7 males. For every 100 females age 18 and over, there were 92.1 males.

The median income for a household in the city was $40,652, and the median income for a family was $49,886. Males had a median income of $30,543 versus $22,500 for females. The per capita income for the city was $21,097. About 5.3% of families and 7.0% of the population were below the poverty line, including 10.8% of those under age 18 and 15.3% of those age 65 or over.

== Education ==
It is in the Catawba County Schools school district.

== Notable people ==
- William Harrison Anderson – American missionary for the Seventh-day Adventist Church
- Landon Huffman – stock car racing driver and YouTuber
- Robert Huffman – former NASCAR driver, five-time Goody's Dash Series champion
