= Basildon Peta =

Exiled Zimbabwean journalist

- Born: c. 1970
- Occupations: Journalist and publisher
- Employer(s): formerly with the Daily Gazette, Financial Gazette, The Independent (UK), New Zealand Herald
- Organization: Africa Media Holdings
- Known for: his tough reporting under difficult political circumstances, his voice as an exiled Zimbabwean journalist and his founding of a media company that publishes some of Lesotho's main newspaper publications.
- Spouse: Married to Sekai Florence Peta
- Children: 3
- Awards: MISA Press Freedom Award (1994)

Basildon Peta (c. 1972 – ) was the second journalist ever to be awarded the Media Institute of Southern Africa's Press Freedom Award for his reporting in Zimbabwe. In his homeland, Peta was persecuted and he fled for his life after receiving threats from the Robert Mugabe regime in 2001 and incurring a brief detainment in Harare before the April 2002 elections. Since his exile in February 2002 to South Africa, Peta has reported for newspapers in the United Kingdom and New Zealand. He currently writes editorials and is the owner of a newspaper publishing company in Maseru, Lesotho.

== Personal ==
He grew up in Chitungwiza, which is commonly referred to as "Chi Town." Peta is married and the father of four children.

== Career ==
Mentioned locations relative to Lesotho.

As a result of reporting in Zimbabwe's Daily Gazette about tax evasion by Zimbabwe bureaucrats, Basildon Peta was held for 7 days in 1994 by authorities under the Official Secrets Act. For his refusal to give up his principles, modify his reporting or reveal his sources, Peta at 24 years old was awarded the second Press Freedom Award by the Media Institute of Southern Africa.

He also has worked for the Zimbabwe Independent.

Peta was the Secretary General of the Zimbabwe Union of Journalists and had contact with the government in its attempt to draft a new constitution, but the results were not favourable and the ZUJ planned to challenge them.

Later, after his reporting about the white-black land wars were published, a Mugabe's spokesperson labelled Peta a "terrorist" in 2001. Ahead elections in Zimbabwe in the next year, Peta was one of seven journalists on a hit list by Mugabe's Central Intelligence Organization. Peta said he also received a threat in the form of a manila envelope full of bullets. He published an article in The Independent afterwards in which he remained defiant and wrote that he will continue "to tell the truth". He was detained again in February 2002 under Zimbabwe's newly enacted Public Order and Security Act for 15 hours. Peta was the first journalist arrested after the strict law had been passed. He left the Zimbabwe for South Africa shortly after his detention amid allegations that he had lied about his detention. At the time, he reported for Zimbabwe's Financial Gazette and The Independent (UK), for which he began to work around 2000. From exile, Peta said he and his family had suffered for two years. In 2005, the ZANU-PF party issued a list of traitors that included Basildon Peta's name. After fleeing to South Africa in 2002, Peta returned to Zimbabwe in 2010 and wrote about his reactions.

He is currently the CEO of Africa Media Holdings, which is the publishing company behind the Lesotho Times. The newspaper is a weekly published since 2008. In 2009, the company began publishing the Sunday Express every weekend. These two newspapers are the main publications in Lesotho and are also distributed to a large Basotho audience in South Africa. The masthead of the Lesotho Times reads: "News without fear or favour."

His editor for the two papers Darlington Majonga left in 2011 to establish another English-language newspaper called the Free State Times with regional coverage.

== Lawsuits ==
When Basildon Peta worked for Modus Publications and wrote for Financial Gazette, Christopher Mushowe, principal director in Robert Mugabe's office, attempted to sue him for implicating him in corruption. Mushowe was a member Mugabe's party, Zimbabwe African National Union – Patriotic Front. The article that Peta wrote was about whether Mushowe deserved a passing grade from the University of Zimbabwe. The lawsuit against Peta failed.

== Awards ==
- 1994 – MISA Press Freedom Award. The Media Institute of Southern Africa awarded Peta for his strong will during a week of imprisonment and his tough reporting on the government Zimbabwe afterward. The previous recipient of the award was Onesimo Makani Kabweza, who was also from Zimbabwe.

== Notable works of journalism ==
Basildon Peta's reporting occurred in three separate periods. From 1990s–2002, he reported in Zimbabwe. After his 2002 exile to South Africa, he reported from Johannesburg. In 2008, he started publishing newspapers in Maseru, Lesotho.

- His reporting around 1994 about tax evasion involving bureaucrats in Zimbabwe.
- Basildon Peta, "Zimbabwe near collapse after farm exodus," The Independent (UK), 6 August 2000.
- Basildon Peta, "Mugabe party 'fears the hand of Lucifer'," New Zealand Herald, 10 June 2001.
- Basildon Peta, "Mbeki lied to Bush over Mugabe talks, says opposition," New Zealand Herald, 10 July 2003.
- Basildon Peta, "Our fellow Africans will do nothing for us in our hour of need," The Independent (UK), 27 September 2007.
- Basildon Peta, "Lesotho has lost its way," Daily News, 7 May 2012.
