= Anderson Mazoka =

Zambian politician

President of UPND
- In office December 1998 – 14 May 2006
- Preceded by: Party Created
- Succeeded by: Hakainde Hichilema

Personal details
- Born: Anderson Mazoka; 22 March 1943 Monze, Northern Rhodesia
- Died: 24 May 2006 (aged 63) Johannesburg
- Party: UPND (1998–2006)
- Spouse: Mutinta Christine Mazoka (?-2006; his death)
- Children: 4 including Mutinta

Anderson K. Mazoka (22 March 1943 – 24 May 2006) was a Zambian politician and President of the United Party for National Development (UPND), the current ruling party.

== Life ==
Mazoka was born in Monze. He attended Union College, where he graduated in 1969 with a degree in mechanical engineering. For his senior thesis, Mazoka designed and built a wind tunnel in 10 weeks. The tunnel, whose construction attracted attention from the media, filled the basement of the college's Science and Engineering department and would be used for three decades.

In the presidential election held on 27 December 2001, he finished second behind Levy Mwanawasa of the ruling Movement for Multiparty Democracy (MMD) party, winning 27.2% of the vote.

On 24 May 2006, Mazoka died from kidney complications in Johannesburg, South Africa. He was 63 years old. He was succeeded as leader of the UPND by Hakainde Hichilema.

Mazoka had held a senior position within the British mining company Anglo American plc.

He was married to Mutinta and had three children with her: Mutinta, Pasina and Anderson Jr. His eldest daughter Macenje was from his first marriage to Zenobia Lewis. Macente Mazoba became Zambia's High Commission to the UK.
