= Charles Lwanga College of Education =

Coordinates: 16°25′23.2″S 27°33′28.02″E

- Established: 1959; 67 years ago
- Location: Chisekesi, Monze District, Zambia
- Affiliations: Jesuit, Catholic; University of Zambia
- Website: www.clce.ac.zm

Charles Lwanga College of Education was opened by the Jesuits in Chisekesi, Monze District, Zambia, in 1959. It offers degrees in education in affiliation with the University of Zambia and the Ministry of Education. Since 2010 the college has also offered an e-learning program. Charles Lwanga was a martyred African saint from the late 19th century.

== Programs ==
The college offers a three-year Diploma in Primary Education to full-time students. The potential candidates need five credits, including English and mathematics. The enrolment is one hundred students every year. There are hostels for men and for women.

Additionally, the college offers a two-year Diploma in Primary Education to distant students.

In 2014 Gonzaga University in Spokane, Washington, United States, completed a program in which it offered a master's degree in education through e-learning for the teachers at Lwanga. The government of Zambia had stipulated that with these degrees Lwanga could be raised to the status of a four-year university and offer the Bachelor in Education degree. Master's theses were aimed at improving teaching methods in Zambia. All twenty-five of the teachers and administrators from Lwanga who were involved in the program were flown to Spokane for two weeks of intensive instruction as one segment of their course. The twinning arrangement with Gonzaga is ongoing.

== See also ==
- List of Jesuit sites
