= Pemba (constituency) =

Constituency of the National Assembly of Zambia

Pemba is a constituency of the National Assembly of Zambia. It covers Pemba and surrounding areas in Pemba District of Southern Province.

== List of MPs ==
Election year	MP	Party
Pemba
1968	Zacharia Hamusankwa	Zambian African National Congress
1971 (by-election)	Farmer Evelyn	Zambian African National Congress
1973	Peter Muunga	United National Independence Party
1978	Landson Hantuba	United National Independence Party
1983	Landson Hantuba	United National Independence Party
1988	Aaron Chona	United National Independence Party
1991	Aaron Muyovwe	Movement for Multi-Party Democracy
1993 (by-election)	Daniel Buumba	Movement for Multi-Party Democracy
1996	Aaron Muyovwe	Movement for Multi-Party Democracy
1998 (by-election)	Staford Mudiyo	Movement for Multi-Party Democracy
2000 (by-election)	Joshua Simuyandi	Movement for Multi-Party Democracy
2001	David Matongo	United Party for National Development
2006	David Matongo	United Party for National Development
2011	Mutinta Mazoka	United Party for National Development
2016	Mutinta Mazoka	United Party for National Development
2021	Lameck Hamwaata	United Party for National Development
2026	Obey Habeenzu	United Party for National Development
