= Mutinta C. Mazoka =

Zambian politician

Spouse of President of UPND
- In office December 1998 – 14 May 2006
- President: Anderson Mazoka
- Preceded by: Party Created
- Succeeded by: Mutinta Hichilema

Personal details
- Born: 1949 (age 76–77) Zambia
- Party: UPND
- Spouse: Anderson Mazoka
- Children: 3 including Mutinta

Mutinta Christine Mazoka (born 1949) is a Zambian politician. She was the member of the National Assembly of Zambia for Pemba Constituency from 2011 to 2021. From 2021 to 2026, she served as a nominated member of the National Assembly.

== Biography ==
Mutinta Christine Mazoka was born in 1949.

She was married to Anderson Mazoka, the founder of the United Party for National Development, who died in 2006. The couple met in 1975 and married the following year. They had three children: Mutinta, Pasina, and Anderson Jr.

Mazoka is a member of her late husband's UPND. She was elected in 2011 to represent the constituency of Pemba in the National Assembly of Zambia and was the first woman to represent the constituency. In 2016, she was reelected to Zambia's parliament to represent Pemba. She opted to leave office in 2021. However, later that year, newly elected President Hakainde Hichilema appointed Mazoka as one of eight nominated members of parliament. She held this role until 2026, when a new class of nominated members were sworn in.

She previously represented Zambia in the African Union's Pan-African Parliament.

Mazoka owns and operates a farm, and holds a certificate in agriculture.
