= Dipak Patel (politician) =

Zambian politician

Member of Parliament for Lusaka Central
- In office 1991–2006
- Succeeded by: Guy Scott

Personal details
- Born: 12 July 1953 (age 73) Mufulira, Northern Rhodesia
- Party: Movement for Multi-Party Democracy (1991-1996); Independent (1996-2001); Forum for Democracy and Development (2001-2006)

Dipak Kumar A. Patel (born 12 July 1953 in Mufulira) is a Zambian politician of Hindu Indian origin. His ancestral roots traces back to Gujarat, India. He served long tenures both as a Member of Parliament for Lusaka Central and as the Minister of Trade, Commerce, and Industry.

== Career ==
Patel was elected in 1991 to the National Assembly of Zambia under the Movement for Multi-Party Democracy (MMD) in the Lusaka Central constituency. During this time he was also a member of the MMD's national executive committee. He was appointed Deputy Minister in the Ministry of Trade, Commerce, and Industry from 1991 to 1992, then held a succession of Cabinet Minister positions in the Ministry of Information and Broadcasting (1992), the Ministry of Youth, Sports, and Child Development (1992–1993), and the Ministry of Trade, Commerce, and Industry (1993–1996). He was one of two cabinet-level members of Indian origin in President Frederick Chiluba's government, the other being Minister of Agriculture Suresh Desai. However, he resigned from that last position in February 1996 due to disagreements with Chiluba; specifically, he objected to a proposed constitutional amendment which would bar individuals of "foreign parentage" from contesting the presidency. In the 1996 elections, he ran without any party affiliation and was returned to his seat representing Lusaka Central; in the 2001 elections he ran on the Forum for Democracy and Development ticket and was again elected.

== Relations with Mwanawasa ==
In 2002, while a lawmaker, Patel received a police summons for having allegedly insulted Levy Mwanawasa, who was elected president in the 2001 election; defaming the head of state is a criminal offence under Zambian law and may incur a jail sentence of up to three years. The Zambia Post had published a quotation by Patel in which he called Mwanawasa a "cabbage", a reference to Mwanawasa's alleged rigging of the presidential election. Police also arrested the Post editor Fred M'membe, but M'membe himself believed Patel was the police's real target. However, Mwanawasa appointed Patel to the position of Cabinet Minister in the Ministry of Trade, Commerce, and Industry in February 2003, in a surprise move which also saw a number of other opposition lawmakers named to his cabinet. During his tenure under Mwanawasa, Patel served as Chair-Co-ordinator for the Least Developed Countries World Trade Organization negotiations in 2005. Patel later changed his opinion of Mwanawasa, and after the latter's death praised him for his independence, stating that "Everyone thought he was going to be Chiluba’s puppet, but he showed very quickly that he took orders from no one".

== Awards and honours ==
- 2001 Defender of Democracy award from international NGO Parliamentarians for Global Action
