= St. Paul's Church, Manora =

Church at Manora Island, Karachi, Pakistan

St. Paul's Church
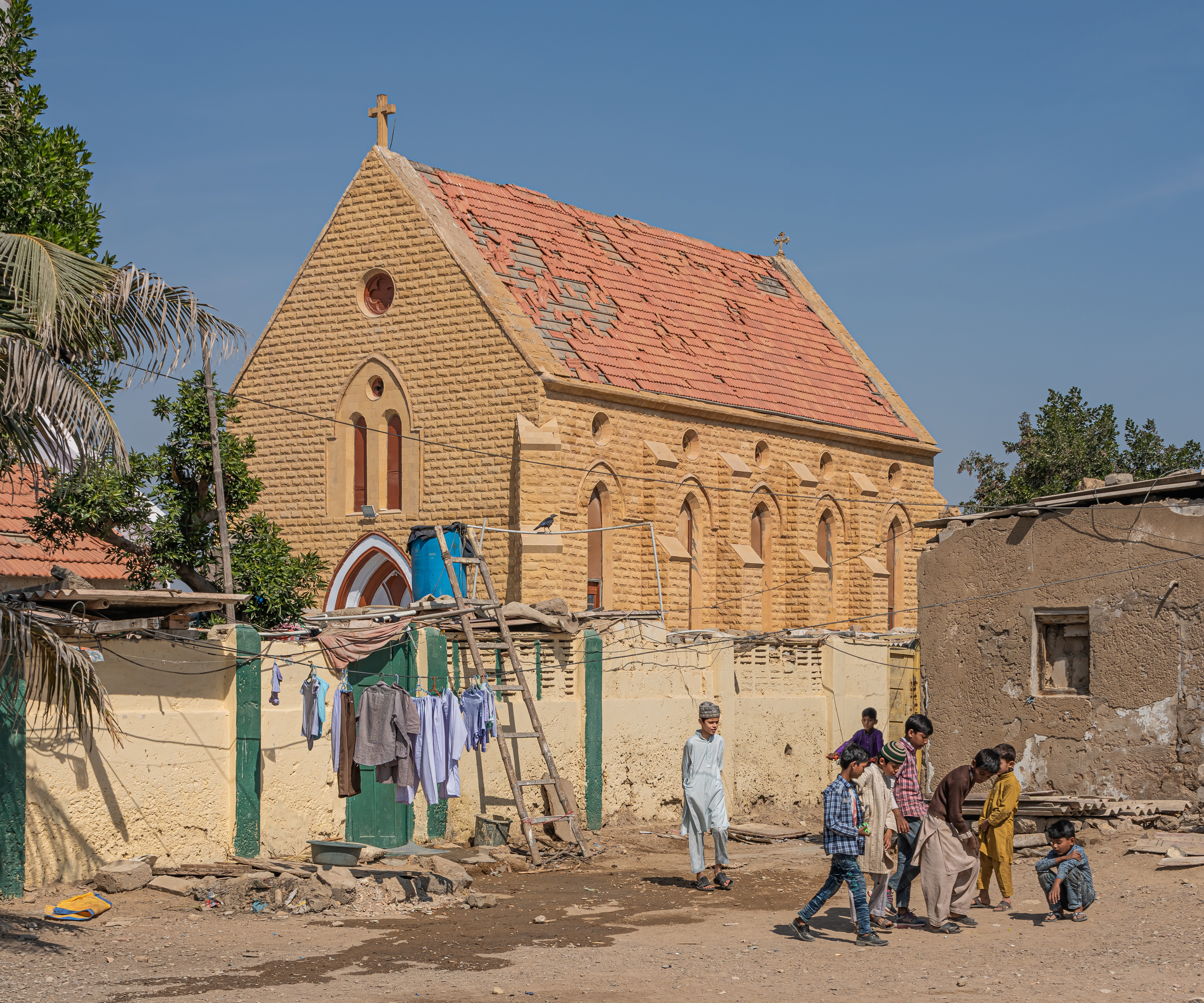
- Location: Manora, Karachi
- Country: Pakistan
- Denomination: Protestant

History
- Founded: 1864
- Dedication: St. Paul
- Consecrated: 1864

Architecture
- Construction cost: 15,000 rupees

Specifications
- Height: 6.1 m

St. Paul's Church is a Protestant church, built in 1864 on Manora, Karachi in Sindh, Pakistan.

It is situated beside the Manora Point Lighthouse and is managed by the Karachi Port Trust. St. Paul's was erected as a memorial to Sir Charles James Napier, the British general who led forces to conquer the Sindh in 1843. The building was recently restored in 2008.

== History ==
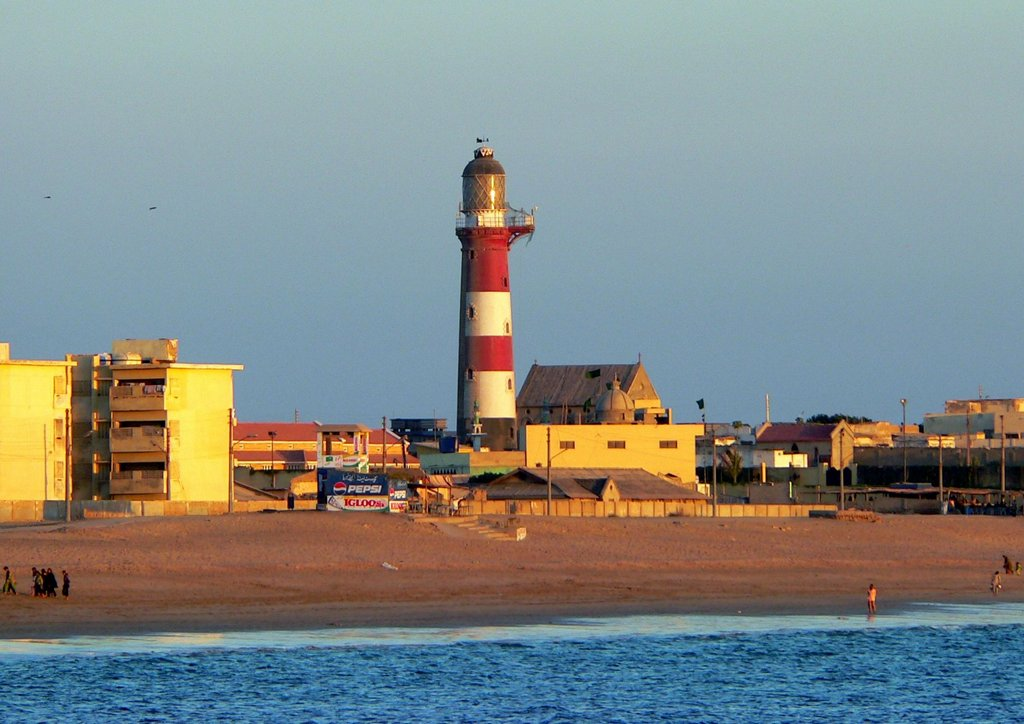
The roof of St. Paul's Church just visible on the right of the Manora Lighthouse

The British forces under General Charles James Napier captured Manora in 1839, as part of their Sindh campaign making it their military base of operations. St. Paul's, among other buildings, was erected as a memorial to the British General. When the church was built it was constructed from limestone from the Hands' Hill Quarries (located 4.8 km (3 mi) from Karachi and 5 from Kiamari) and the lower-grade but cheaper Manora conglomerate. It features an Early English architectural style, and consists of a nave, without aisles, a vestry and a small assembly hall. The nave is 13.1 metres in length and 6 metres wide, with a height up to the tie beam of 6 metres. Despite the church's simple and traditional exterior, the interior features a cathedral style ceiling of wooden trusses. Further references to a gothic style of architecture include the church's four lancet windows, as well as the three-light stained glass windows at its eastern end. The building was completed within the year and consecrated in the following one (1865). Construction costs totalled 15,000 rupees, of which 4,000 rupees were contributed by the Government.

In the early years of St. Paul's church, the congregation was mostly made up of area residents as well as by the crews of the harbour vessels. It was designed to seat 50 persons with services conducted by one of the Government chaplains of the Karachi station every Sunday.

Throughout the church's long history, alterations have been made to the church, including the original exterior of the church being completely cemented over.

== Restoration ==
Restoration work in two phases, due to financial restraints, was carried out on the church to preserve it as a heritage site and restore the "neglected" church to its original form. The restoration process took longer than expected, remaining pending for a year due to lack of finances before resuming and completing the final stage of work in 2008. The money for the restoration was raised privately, as no support from the government or the Karachi Port Trust was able to be given.
