= William Harrison Anderson =

American Seventh-day Adventist missionary (1870–1950)

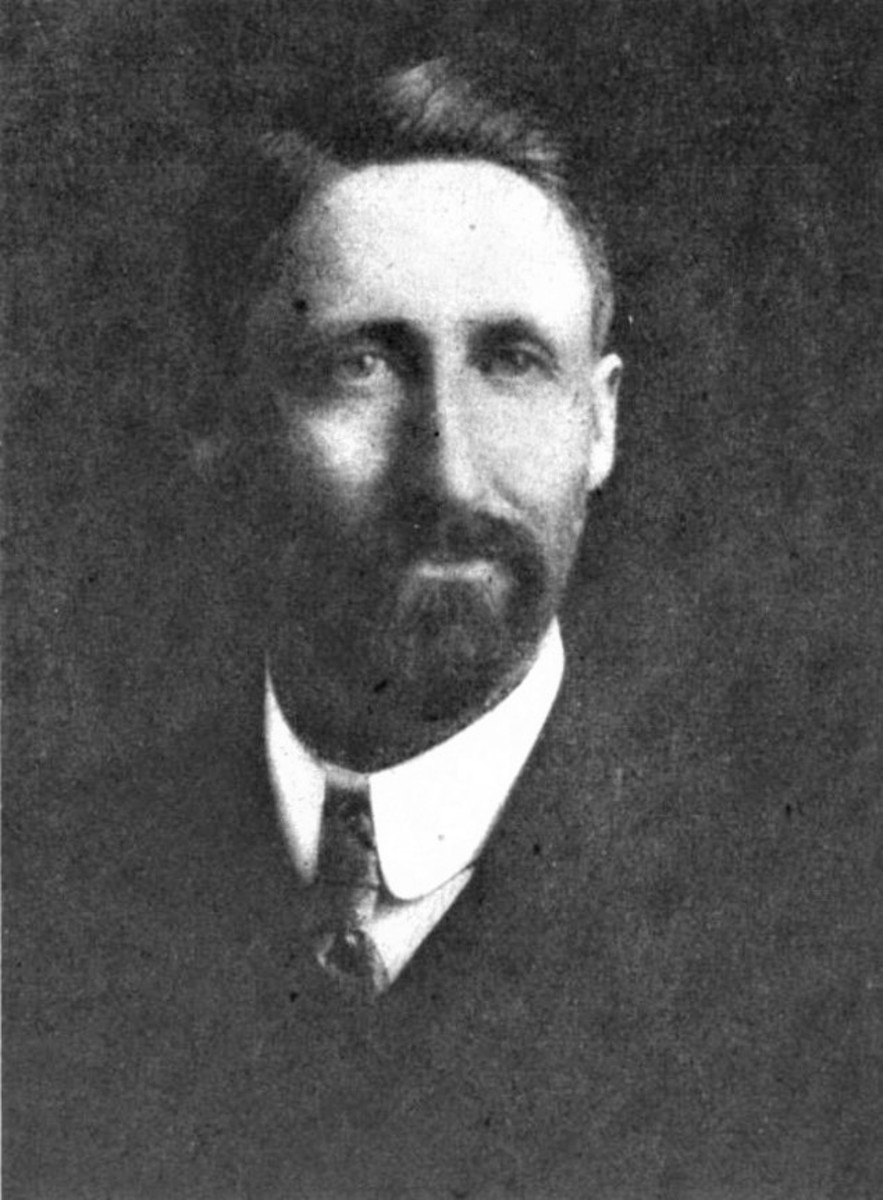
- Anderson pictured in his 1919 On the Trail of Livingstone
- Church: Seventh-day Adventist Church

Personal details
- Born: June 25, 1870 Mexico, Indiana, US
- Died: June 26, 1950 (aged 80) Claremont, North Carolina, US
- Spouse: Nora Haysmer (m. 1895; died 1908); Mary Perin (m. 1914)
- Occupation: Missionary
- Education: Battle Creek College

William Harrison "Harry" Anderson (June 25, 1870 – June 26, 1950) was an American missionary for the Seventh-day Adventist Church. He arrived in Africa in 1895 and established the Solusi Mission near Bulawayo, Rhodesia (modern Zimbabwe). Anderson and the mission survived the Second Matabele War and a 1899–1901 malaria outbreak. In 1903 he established the Rusangu Mission in the north of Rhodesia (modern Zambia), which now hosts schools and a university. Anderson later worked in the Bechuanaland Protectorate and Angola. From 1935 to his retirement in 1945 he was employed by the Seventh-day Adventist Church's Africa Division with responsibilities stretching from Cape Town to Lake Chad.

== Early life ==
William Harrison Anderson was born on June 25, 1870, in Mexico, Indiana. His parents were Elija and Neomi Pearson Anderson and he moved with them shortly afterwards to a farm in New Waverly, Indiana. Anderson attended Battle Creek College at Battle Creek, Michigan and whilst there converted to the Seventh-day Adventist Church, being baptised in 1889. In the early 1890s he helped found the student foreign mission band. On October 24, 1893, Anderson married Nora Haysmer, a fellow student who had joined his band. Nora graduated in 1893 but Anderson graduated in absentia, the couple having agreed to join a Seventh-day Adventist Church mission to Africa.

== Solusi Mission ==
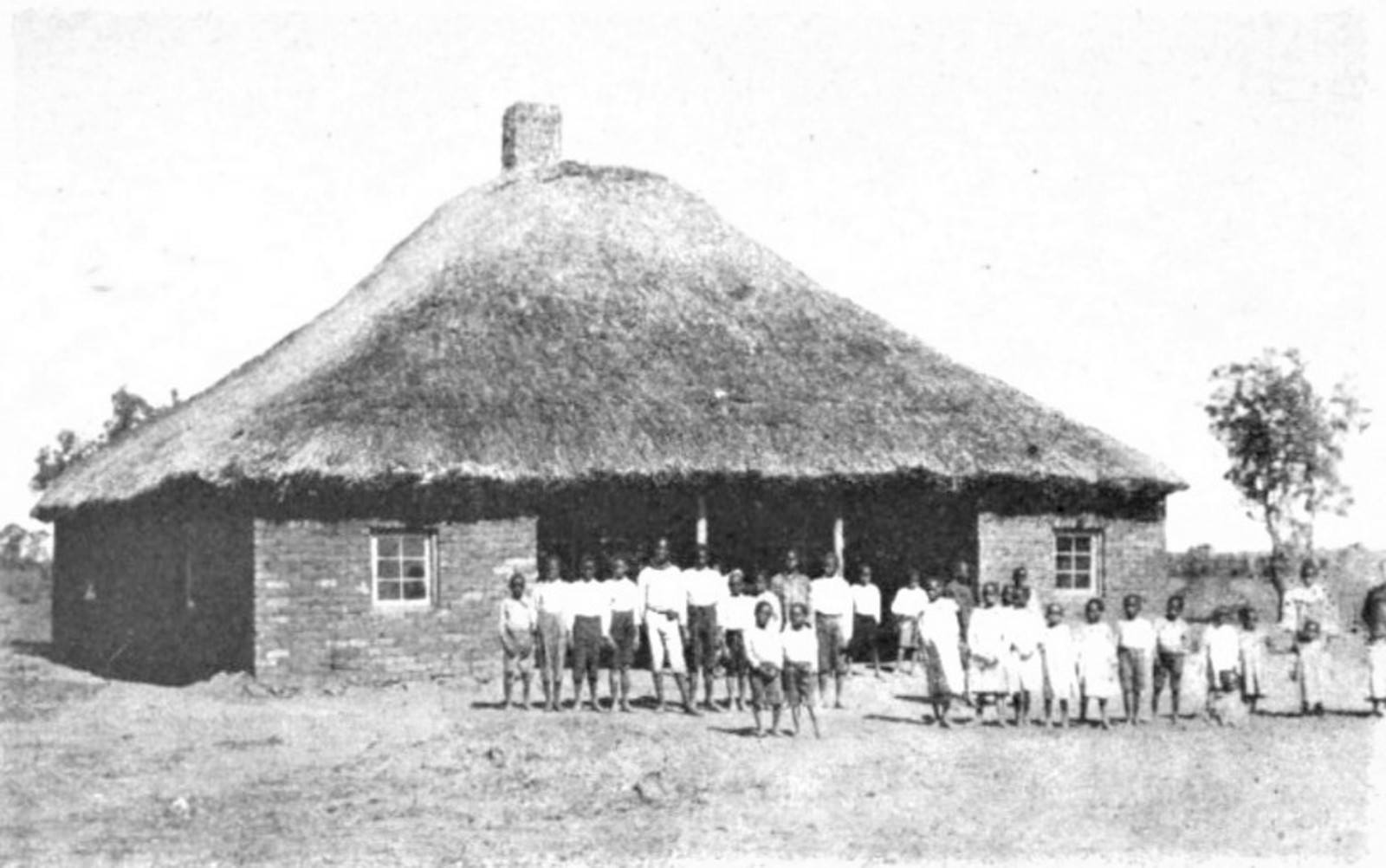
Children at the Solusi Mission, in front of their residence

The Anderson couple boarded a ship for Cape Town at New York on April 10, 1895, with the aim of establishing the first Seventh-day Adventist mission on the continent. The departed Cape Town by rail on May 22 and, reaching the end of the north-bound line at Mafeking, made a seven-week ox-drawn wagon journey to Solusi near Bulawayo in the south part of Rhodesia (now in modern Zimbabwe) which they reached on July 26. The Andersons helped to found the Solusi Mission on 12,000 acres (4,900 ha) of land granted to the church by the British South Africa Company (BSAC) in 1894. This was the first Adventist mission in Africa to be directed at the black population.

The mission suffered early setbacks. Heavy rains disrupted works to erect mud-walled buildings; at one point, a wall of the Andersons' house collapsed onto their newly built wood-fired stove. Disease reduced the mission's cattle herd from 100,000 to just 500. The missionaries were forced to flee to Bulawayo for some months during the Second Matabele War of 1896–97. A malaria outbreak in 1898 led to the deaths of many of the missionaries. A replacement party arriving in 1899 was also struck down by the disease, and by 1901 Anderson and his wife were the only missionaries at the station, the others having died or moved away. Their survival was down to their use of the anti-malarial quinine which had been rejected by the other missionaries as dangerous. The Andersons had had a daughter, their only child, Naomi in 1899. In 1900, the missionaries had built a church and converted the first of the local population.

== Rusangu Mission ==
In locating the new mission there was a combination of four things that I especially desired. First, of course, was proximity to the native. A person can accomplish very little in laboring for the people unless he is near them. Secondly, we wanted a good supply of water...we wanted water for irrigation, that we might raise fruit and garden produce. Thirdly we desired proximity to the railway line... so I followed the watershed, in the hope that we might be near the railway line when it was built through the country.... The fourth point we desired was to establish an industrial mission, where the natives might be taught to work, which is one of the principles of the gospel. We therefore wanted good soil.

— William Harrison Anderson writing about the foundation of the Rusangu Mission

In 1903 Anderson travelled to the northern portion of Rhodesia (modern Zambia) to establish a mission station there. His route followed much of that of the British explorer and missionary David Livingstone. A BSAC official directed him to Monze, at the centre of a region ruled by Chief Monze of the Tonga people who had risen against the company in 1902. The official hoped that the missionaries would help pacify the Tonga.

Monze provided Anderson with a guide and the pair located suitable land which the chief agreed to grant for a mission. He returned to Solusi but received news that his father had died and was granted a 12-month furlough in the United States. Whilst there, Anderson lectured on the Adventist missionary activity, becoming one of the movement's best-known missionaries.

Anderson returned to Monze in 1905. The mission land had been claimed by a priest but he had failed to mark the acquisition in accordance with the local custom. Anderson complied with this requirement by carving a message in a tree trunk at the site and founded the Rusangu Mission and farmstead on September 5, 1905.

Anderson arranged for supplies to be sent from the Solusi mission, and within a month was teaching 40 students at Rusangu whilst learning the Tonga language. Anderson was ordained the same year. The rival priest returned to Rusangu and attempted to lay claim to the mission land. The matter was referred to the district commissioner who awarded the land to Anderson, in compliance with the local custom. The rival was awarded another plot of land on the far side of the river which was developed into a school and hospital. By 1907 Anderson had built a brick house for his family, replacing an earlier mud structure. Nora Anderson contracted blackwater fever on November 24, 1907, and died from the disease at Plumstead Sanitorium, near Cape Town, on February 4, 1908. Her last message to her husband was to urge him to "take care of Naomi; stay by the mission and make it all we have planned, under God, it should be".

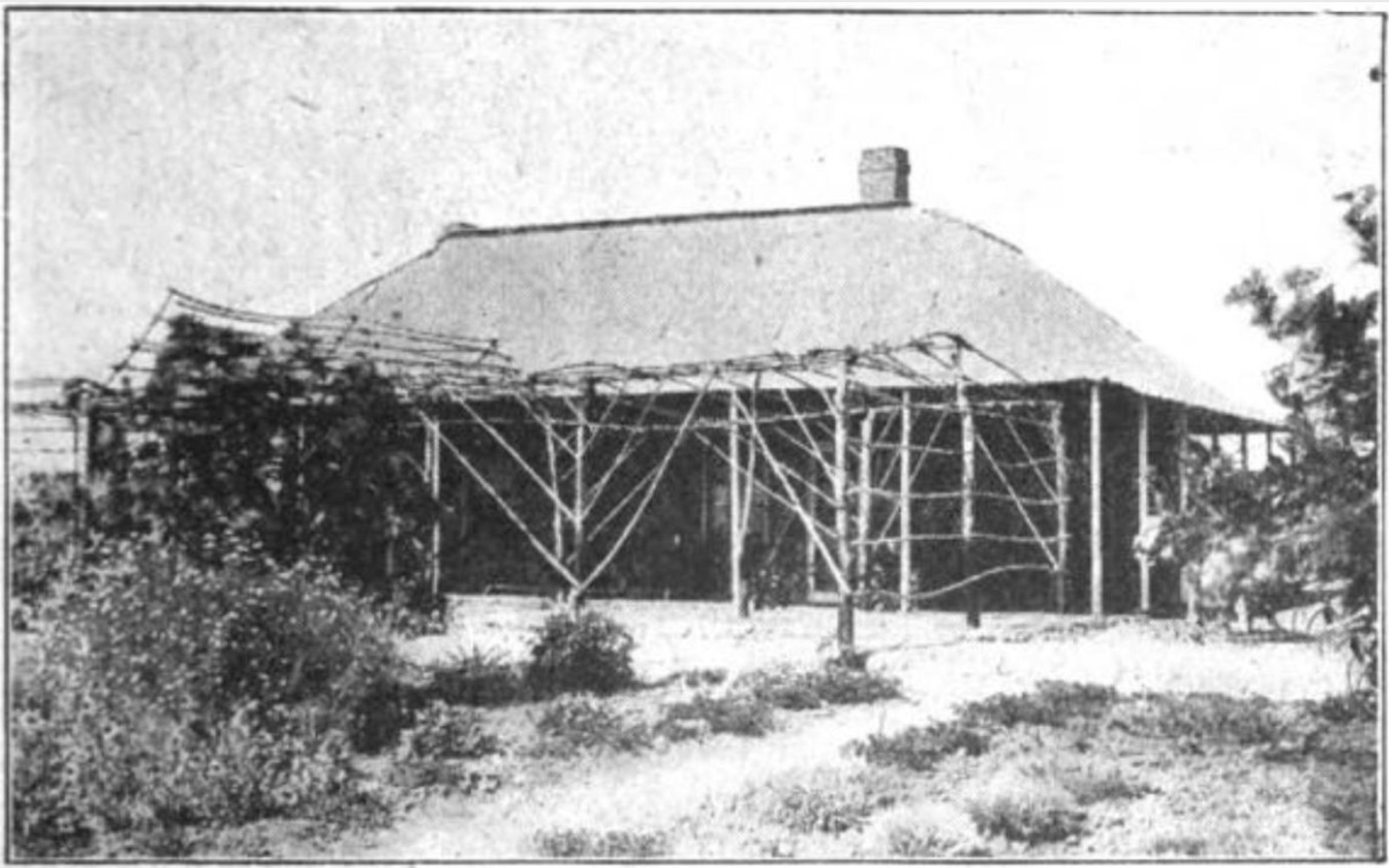
Anderson's house at the Rusangu mission, depicted in his 1919 On the Trail of Livingstone

Anderson received a $1,000 grant from the Adventists' general conference in 1914 to install a borehole at Rusangu, which saved a 2 miles (3.2 km) round trip to collect water from the Magoye River and helped attract local people to the mission. He also served as supervisor for all the church's activity in northern Rhodesia. Anderson got married again on May 10, 1914, to Mary Perin. He was granted furlough from missionary work and between 1916 and 1918 was in the United States.

== Later career and legacy ==
Anderson wrote On the Trail of Livingstone, an account of his life as a missionary. This was published by Pacific Press in the United States in 1919. The book is said to have generated interest in African missionary work amongst the American people. Returning from furlough Anderson moved to Bechuanaland Protectorate (modern Botswana), an area he was familiar with from his journey to Solusi. Anderson was supervisor of the church's missions in the protectorate. In 1922 he moved to the Portuguese colony of Angola, establishing several missions there and heading the Angola Union Mission from 1924 to 1933.

Anderson was employed by the Seventh-day Adventist Church's Africa Division from 1930 to 1945 during which time he had responsibility for establishing new missions, organising meetings and advising new missionaries in a region running from Cape Town to Lake Chad. In this role he celebrated the 50th anniversary of the start of mission work at Solusi by pulling a wagon to the site. During Anderson's career in Southern Africa he saw the Adventist membership rise from around 500 to more than 45,000. The Rusangu mission is now home to a grade school, a high school and a university with around 4,000 students. The Seventh-day Adventist Church remains strong in Zambia (the modern name of northern Rhodesia) with more than 1.3 million members in 2020.

Anderson retired to the United States in 1945 and settled, with his wife, at Claremont, North Carolina. He died at his home there on June 26, 1950, from a heart attack after carrying out gardening work. Anderson had been due to leave home the following day to attend the church's 1950 General Conference.

== Publications ==
- Anderson, W. H (1919). On the trail of Livingstone. Mountain View, California: Pacific Press. OCLC 819572145.
