= List of lighthouses in Pakistan =

This is a list of lighthouses in Pakistan.

== List ==
Name	Year built	Location & coordinates	Class of Light	Focal height (metres)	NGA number	Admiralty number	Range (nautical miles)
Ahsan Channel Range Rear Lighthouse		Port Qasim	Oc W	31	112-28428	D7761	16
Astola Island Lighthouse	1982	Astola Island	Fl W 15s	89	112-28508	D7740	19
Bara Andai Lighthouse		Port of Karachi	Fl(2) WR 8s	35	112-28488	D7752	
Gwadar Lighthouse	1970	Gwadar	Fl(2) W 15s	84	112-28516	D7734	19
Gwadar Range Front Lighthouse	2000s	Gwadar	Iso G 2s	32	112-28518	D7734.3	12
Gwadar Range Rear Lighthouse	2000s	Gwadar	Fl G 3s	45	112-28518.1	D7734.35	12
Jiwani Lighthouse	1970	Jiwani Tehsil	Fl W 10s	140	112-28520	D7731	19
Khuddi Island Lighthouse	1970s	Port Qasim	Fl(4) W 30s	40	112-28424	D7760	17
Karachi Range Rear Lighthouse		Port of Karachi	Oc W 7s	20	112-28480	D7751.1	14
Kunni Range Rear Lighthouse		Port Qasim	Fl W 4s	20	112-28442.1	D7763.51	6
Manora Point Lighthouse	1889	Manora Island	Fl W 7.5s	48	112-28472	D7750	26
Ormara Lighthouse	1970	Ormara	Fl(2) W 20s	227	112-28504	D7742	19
Pasni Lighthouse	1970	Pasni	Fl(3) W 30s	136	112-28512	D7736	17
Phitti Creek Range Rear Lighthouse		Port Qasim	Iso W 4s	20	112-28441.1	D7763.11	6
Ras Muari Lighthouse	1914	Cape Monze	Fl(2) W 10s	49	112-28500	D7745	25
Sir Creek Lighthouse	2005	Indus River Delta	Fl W 12s	46	112-28421	D7850	25
Turshian Mouth Lighthouse	1995	Indus River Delta	Fl(3) w 20s	46	112-28422	D7800	20

== Gallery ==
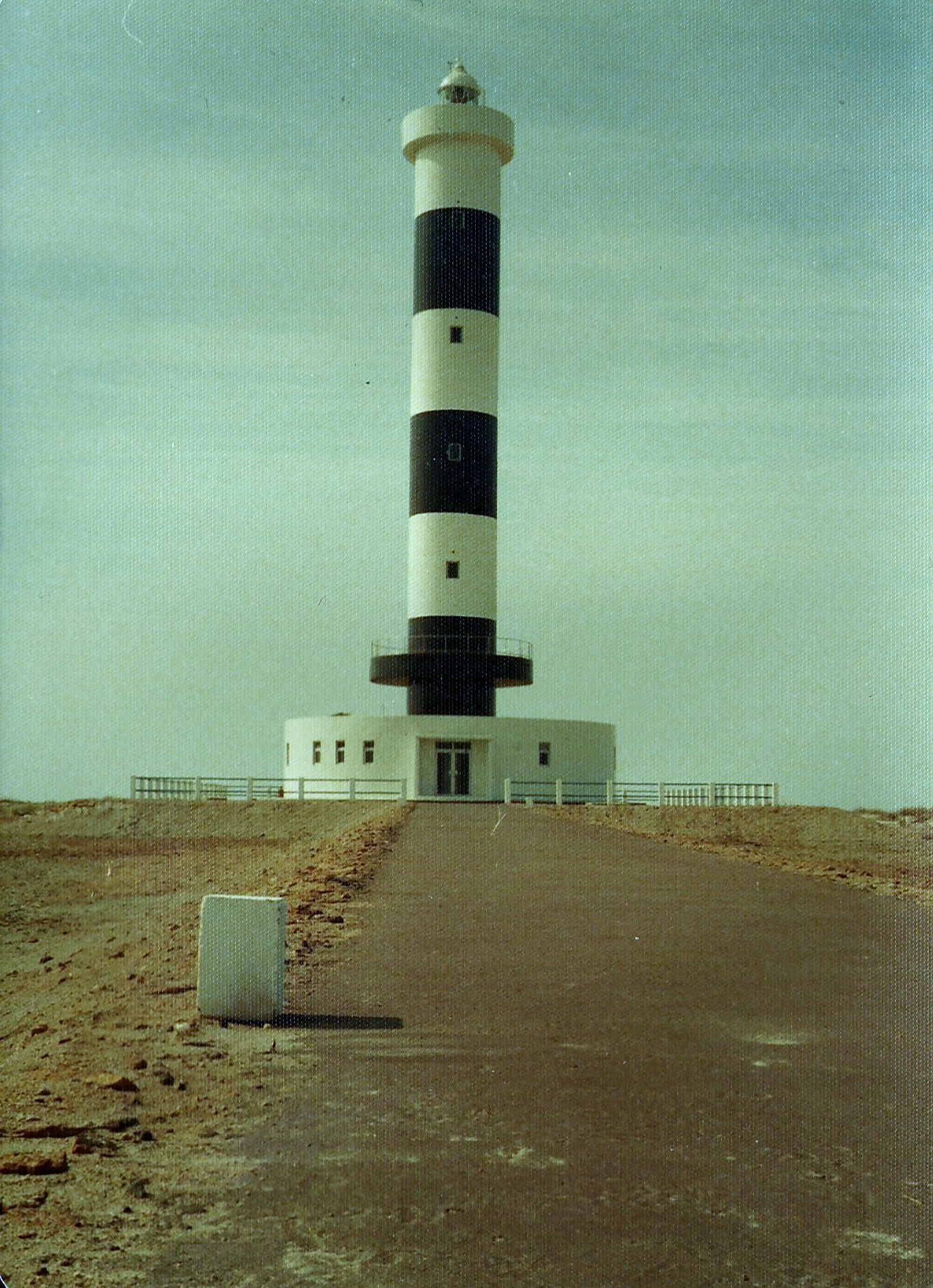
Khuddi Island Lighthouse

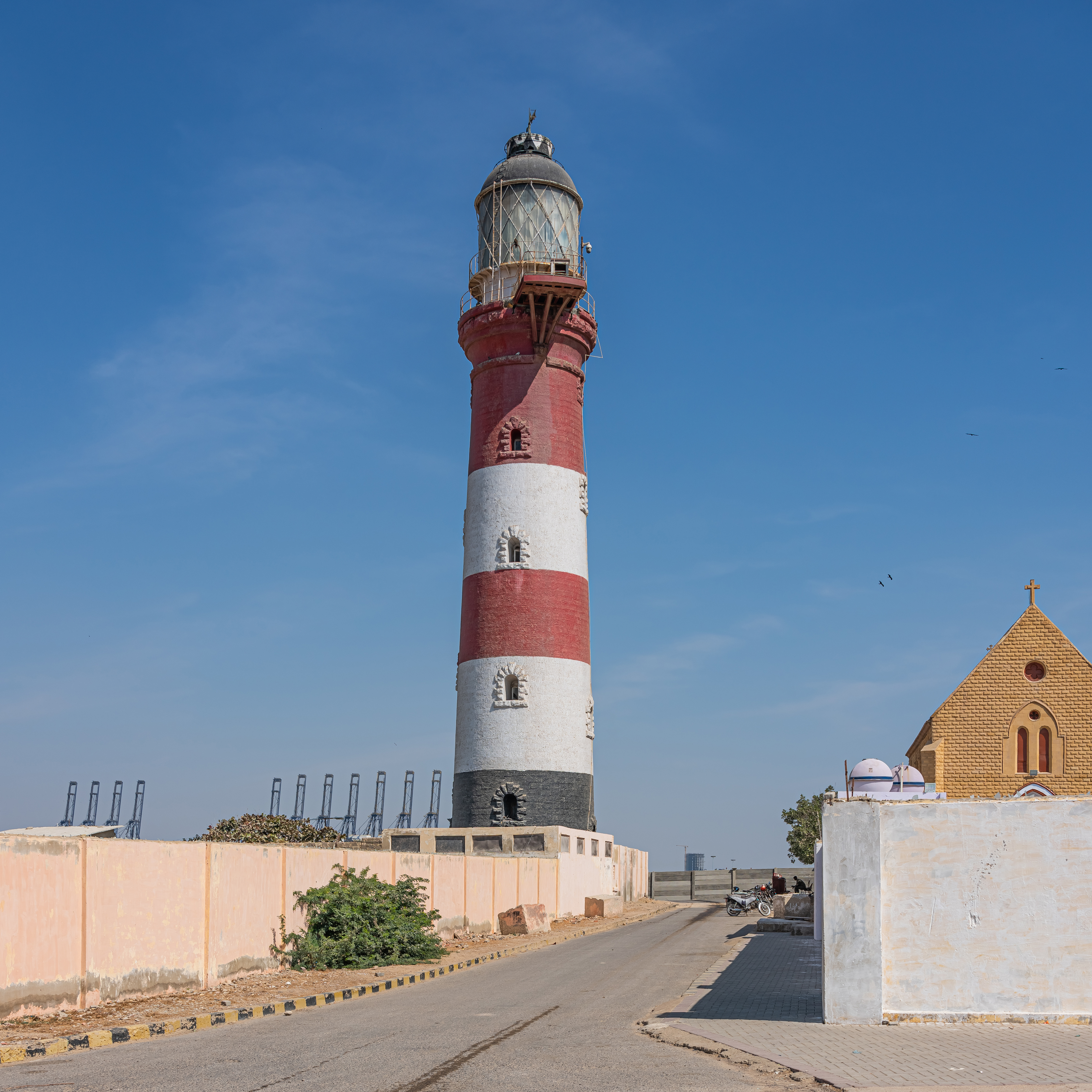
Manora Point Lighthouse

== See also ==
- Lists of lighthouses and lightvessels
