= Moomba (constituency) =

Constituency of the National Assembly of Zambia

Moomba is a constituency of the National Assembly of Zambia. It covers the eastern part of Monze District in Southern Province.

== List of MPs ==
Election year	MP	Party
Moomba
1983	Fitzpatrick Chuula	United National Independence Party
1988	Jeremiah Chijikwa	United National Independence Party
1991	Joshua Lumina	Movement for Multi-Party Democracy
1996	Morris Moonga	Movement for Multi-Party Democracy
2001	Vitalis Mooya	United Party for National Development
2006	Vitalis Mooya	United Party for National Development
2011	Vitalis Mooya	United Party for National Development
2016	Fred Chaatila	United Party for National Development
2021	Fred Chaatila	United Party for National Development
2026	Fred Chaatila	United Party for National Development
