= Chief Monze =

Spiritual leader of the Tonga people of Zambia

Chief Monze is the spiritual leader of the Tonga people of southern Zambia. The chief's palace is south of the town of Monze named after him, near a place called Gonde, where the Lwiindi ceremony takes place. The current Chief Monze, Chief Magunza Monze who assumed this position in 1990, is descendant of a line dating back to the 1700s.
