= Chansa Kabwela =

Zambian journalist and news editor

- Occupations: broadcast, journalist, news editor
- Employer: Zambia Post newspaper

Chansa Kabwela is a Zambian journalist, and news editor of the Zambia Post newspaper, who came to wide attention after her arrest on obscenity charges. Kabwela had distributed graphic images of childbirth to government officials to illustrate the effects of a Zambian nurses' strike. Kabwela was acquitted of the obscenity charge.

== Background ==
On July 13, 2009, Kabwela was arrested for "distributing obscene material": on June 10, in order to illustrate the effect of a strike by Zambian nurses, she sent government officials photographs of a woman giving birth in a hospital parking lot without benefit of medical assistance (the infant, who was in the breech position, suffocated during delivery).

President Rupiah Banda declared that the images (which had been taken by the woman's husband, and which Kabwela had considered too graphic to publish) were pornographic, and ordered the arrest of the person responsible; Kabwela subsequently turned herself in to police. Her trial began in August 2009. The Committee to Protect Journalists called the charges against Kabwela "bogus", and Reporters Without Borders described the charges as "ridiculous" and "absurd."

On August 10, the Post published an editorial in support of Kabwela, calling the trial a "comedy of errors"; they were subsequently charged with contempt of court. Those charges were later dropped.

As well, the Patriotic Front demonstrated in support of Kabwela, leading to clashes with supporters of the ruling Movement for Multi-Party Democracy.

She was acquitted on November 16.
