= Astola Island =

Uninhabited Pakistani island in the Arabian Sea

Astola Island Lighthouse
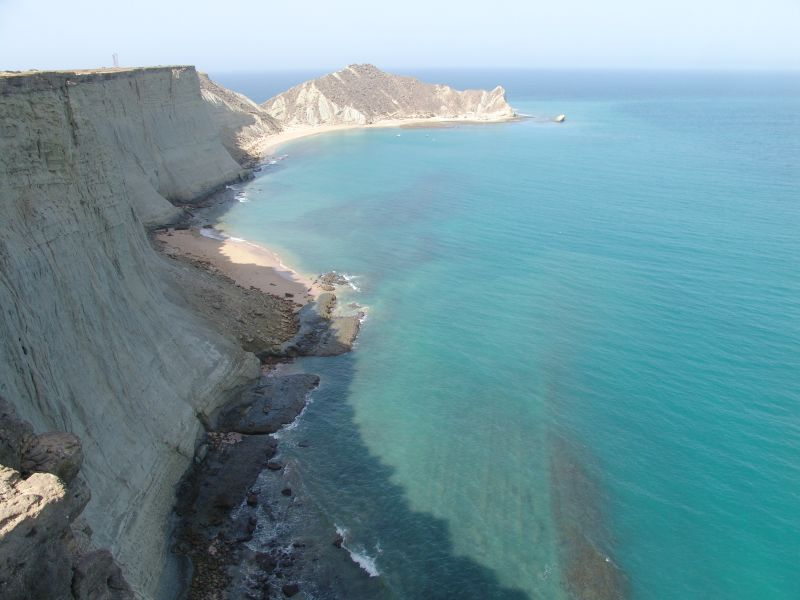
- A view of the northern face of Astola Island. The skeletal lighthouse is in the upper left.
- Location: Astola Island, Balochistan, Gwadar District, Pakistan
- Coordinates: 25°07′08″N 63°50′00″E

Tower
- Constructed: 1982
- Construction: concrete (foundation), metal (tower)
- Height: 10 m (33 ft)
- Shape: square pyramidal skeletal tower
- Markings: Grey
- Power source: solar power

Light
- Focal height: 89 m (292 ft)
- Lens: Type LASE-28/6
- Intensity: 25,500 candela
- Range: 19 nmi (35 km; 22 mi)
- Characteristic: Fl W 15s

Ramsar Wetland
- Designated: 10 May 2001
- Reference no.: 1063

Astola Island (Urdu: جزِیرہ اَستُولا, romanized: Jazīrah-ē-Astūlā), also known as Haft Talar and Satadip (lit. 'Island of the Seven Hills'), is an uninhabited Pakistani island in the Arabian Sea approximately 25 kilometres (16 mi) south of the nearest part of the coast and 35 kilometres (22 mi) southeast of the fishing port of Pasni. It is designated under the Ramsar convention as a wetland of international importance in Pakistan.

Astola is the country's largest offshore island, with an area of 6.7 square kilometres (2.6 sq mi). The highest point is 246 feet (75 m) above sea level. The island is situated near Pasni, Gwadar District of Balochistan province. The island can be reached by boats from Pasni in about three hours. On 4 August 2020, Pakistan released a new political map that for the first time showed the Islands of Churna and Astola.

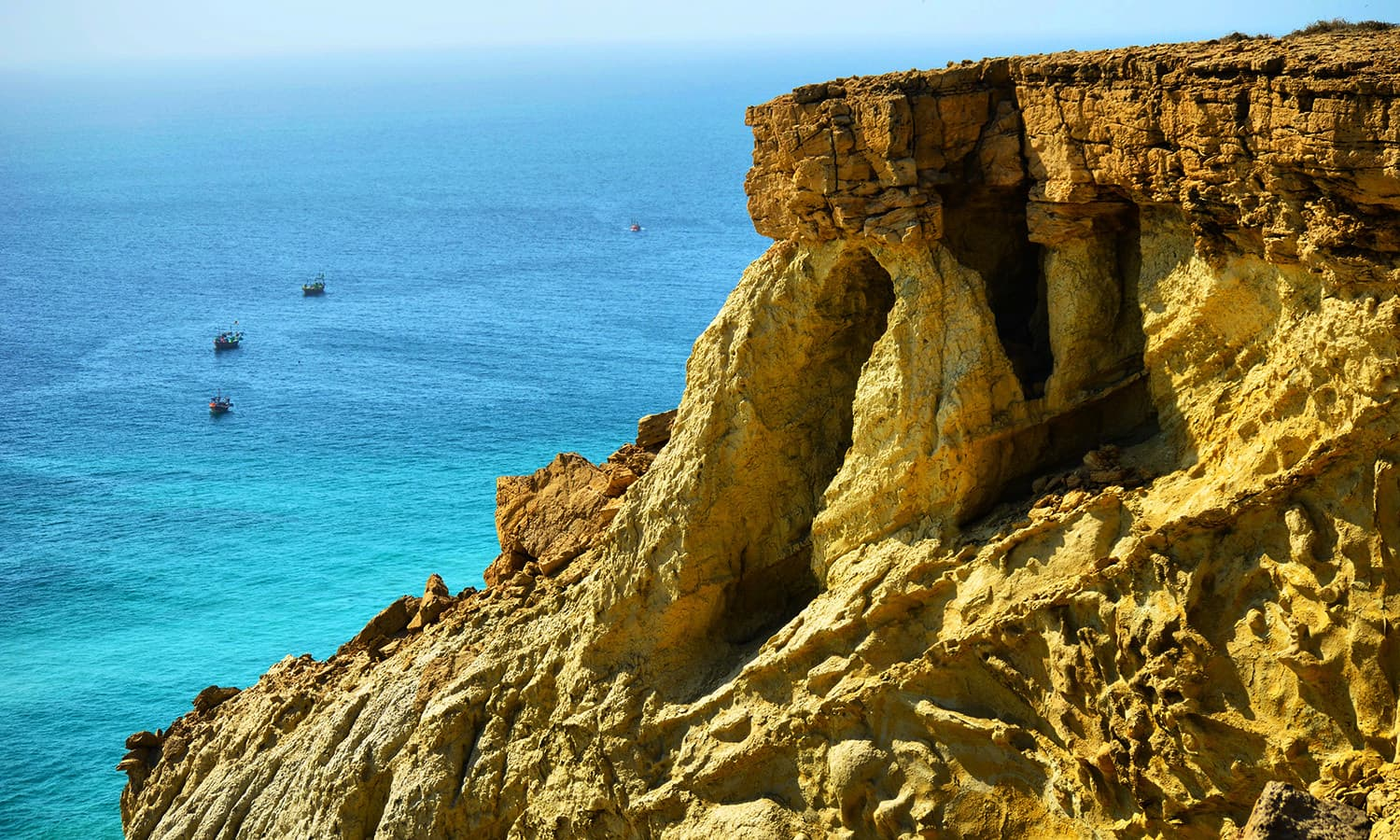
Astola Island

== Marine Protected Area ==
Pakistan declared Astola its first Marine Protected Area in June 2017 as part an international obligation of the Federal Government under the Convention on Biological Diversity and its Aichi Biodiversity Targets. The marine protected area has a length of approximately 3.5 kilometres (2.2 mi) and a width of 1.5 kilometres (0.93 mi) and covers a total area of 6.7 square kilometres (2.6 sq mi).

== Climate ==
Astola Island experiences a hot desert climate (Köppen BWh), influenced by its coastal position in the Arabian Sea. The island maintains consistently warm temperatures throughout the year, with minimal variation between day and night.

Summers (May to August) are hot and humid, with average highs around 32 °C (90 °F) and nighttime lows near 28 °C (82 °F). Winters (December to February) are mild, with daytime temperatures ranging from 27 °C (81 °F) to 29 °C (84 °F), and nighttime lows typically between 19 °C (66 °F) and 21 °C (70 °F).

Annual rainfall on the island is very low, averaging less than 28 mm (1.1 in), with most precipitation occurring during the months of November to March due to western disturbances.

== History ==
The earliest mention of Astola is in Arrian's account of Admiral Nearchos, who was dispatched by Alexander the Great to explore the coast of the Arabian Sea and the Persian Gulf in 325 BC. The sailors in Nearchos' fleet were "frightened at the weird tales told about an uninhabited island, which Arrian calls Nosala". It was also called Carmina, Karmine, by Arrian.

== Geography ==
The island consists of a large tilted plateau and a series of seven small hillocks (hence the local name "Haft Talar" or "Seven Hills"), with deep chasms and crevices, which are several feet wide. There are several natural caves and coves on the island. The south face of the island slopes off gradually, while the north face is cliff-like with a sharp vertical drop.

== Ecology ==
Isolation has helped maintain several endemic lifeforms on Astola. The endangered green turtle (Chelonia mydas) and the hawksbill turtle (Eretmochelys imbracata) nest on the beach at the foot of the cliffs. The island is also an important area for endemic reptiles such as the Astola viper (Echis carinatus astolae). The island is reported to support a large number of breeding water birds, including coursers, curlews, godwit, gulls, plovers, and sanderling. Feral cats, originally introduced by fishermen to control the endemic rodent population, pose an increasing threat to wildlife breeding sites. The sooty gull (Larus hemprichii) had a major breeding colony on the island, but is now extirpated because of the cats.

Vegetation on the island is sparse and largely consists of scrubs and large bushes. There are no trees; the largest shrub is Prosopis juliflora, which was introduced into South Asia in 1877 from South America. There is no source of fresh water, and the vegetation depends on occasional rainfall and soil moisture for survival. Astola is also home to coral reefs.

== Man-made features ==
In 1982, the Government of Pakistan installed a lighthouse on the island for the safety of passing vessels, which was replaced by a solar-powered one in 1987.

Astola became a temporary base for mainland fishermen for catching lobsters and oysters. From June to August, the island remains uninhabited due to the fishing off-season, rough seas, and high tides.

There is a small mosque dedicated to the Muslim saint Pir Khawaja Khizr, which is used by the mainland fishermen during the fishing season. Ruins of an ancient Hindu temple of the Hindu goddess Kali are located on the island. The island was also known to the Hindus as Satadip.

In Arrian's Indica, which describes the westward journey of Alexander's fleet after the Indian Campaign (325 BC), Admiral Nearchus is quoted as having anchored by an island named "Carnine". It was said to be inhabited by the Ichthyophagoi ('fish eaters' in Greek), and "even [its] mutton had a fishy taste". The Persian phrase mahi khoran (fish eaters) has become the modern name of the coastal region of Makran. Some scholars have assumed Carnine to be Astola, without considering the extreme aridity and lack of fresh water, which renders the place inhospitable for human habitation, as well as animal husbandry. In all likelihood, Carnine was the name of an island in the inland sea, presently known as Khor Kalmat. This latter conjecture supports Nearchus' coast-hugging voyage (which would have kept him well away from Astola), a compulsion meant to provision Alexander's army that was supposed to have marched along a coastal route.

== Gallery ==
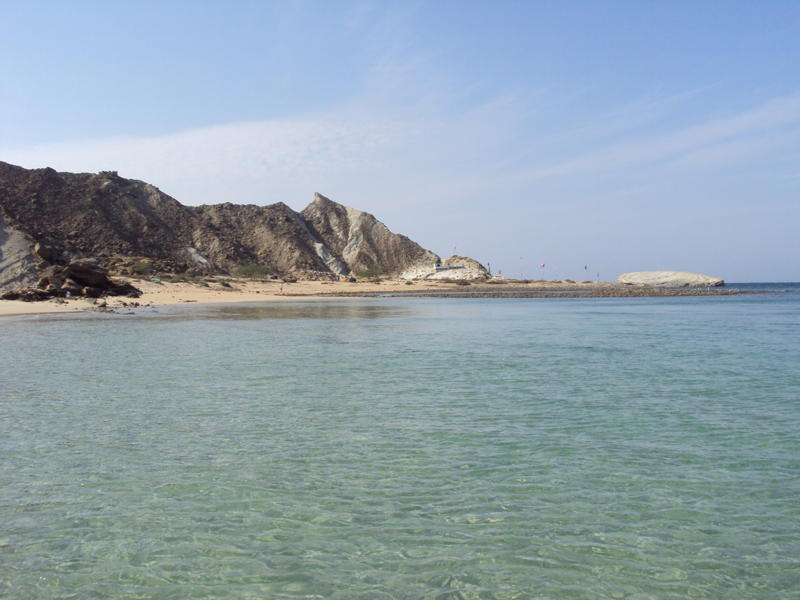

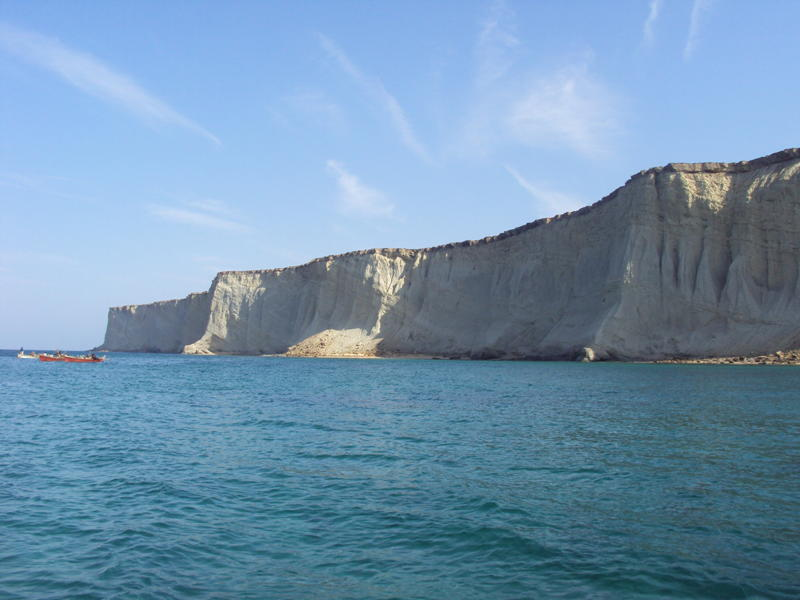

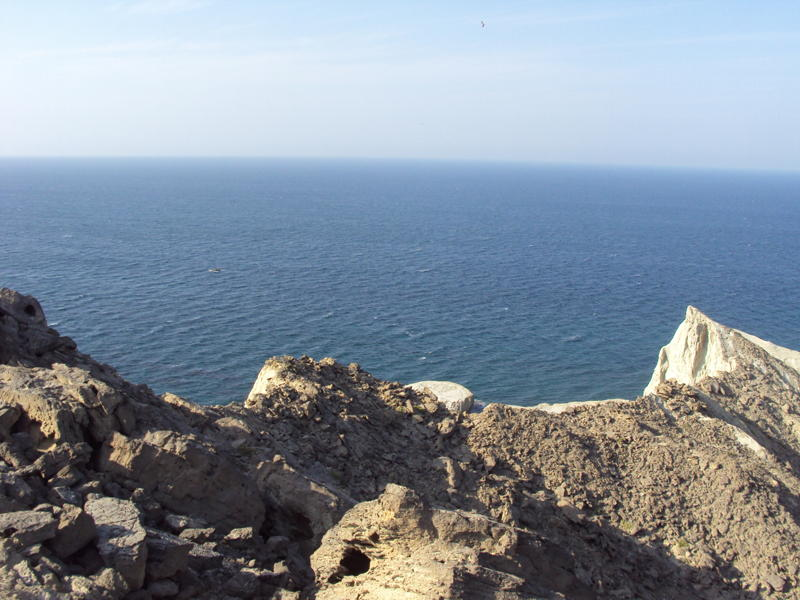

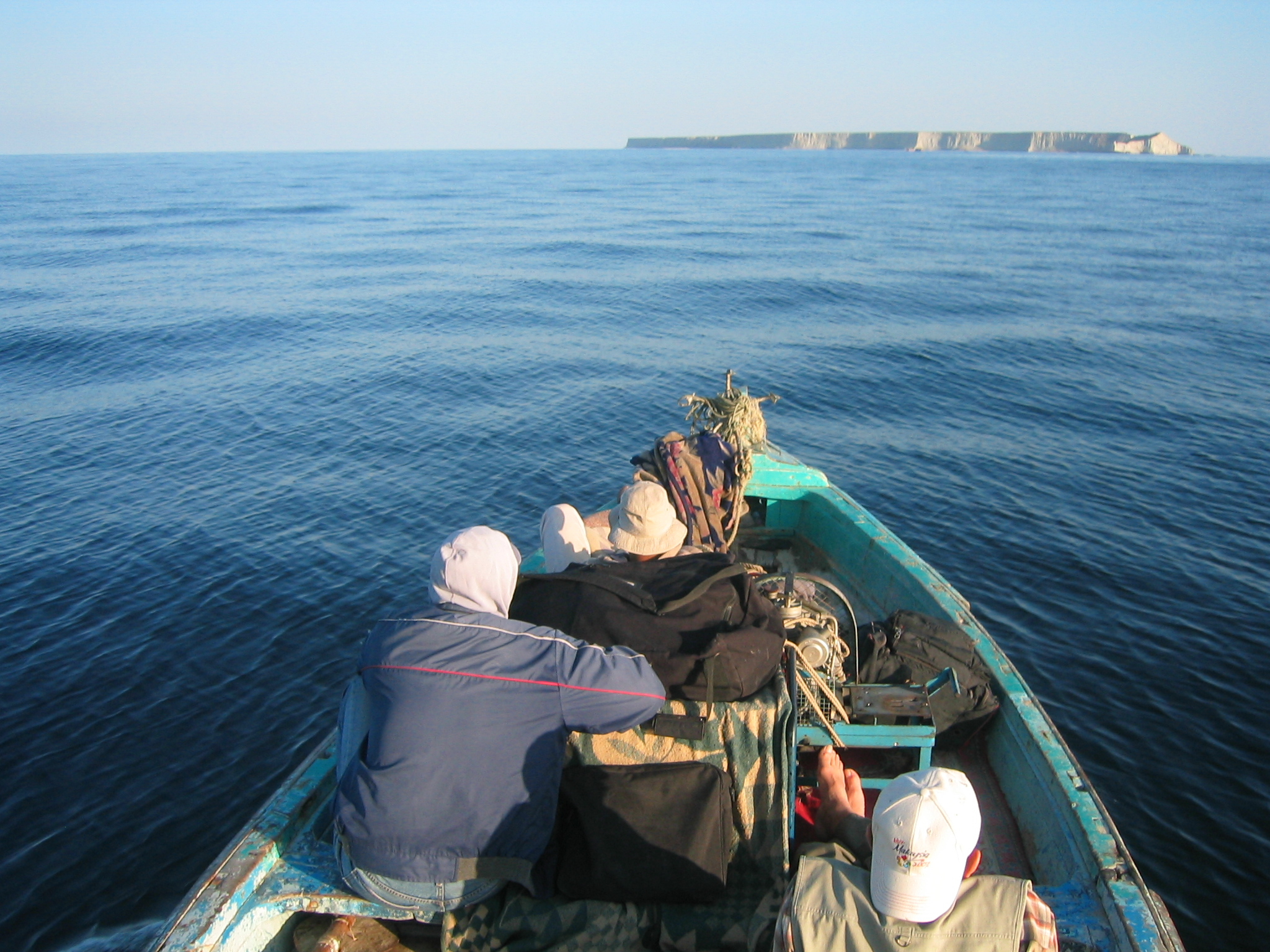

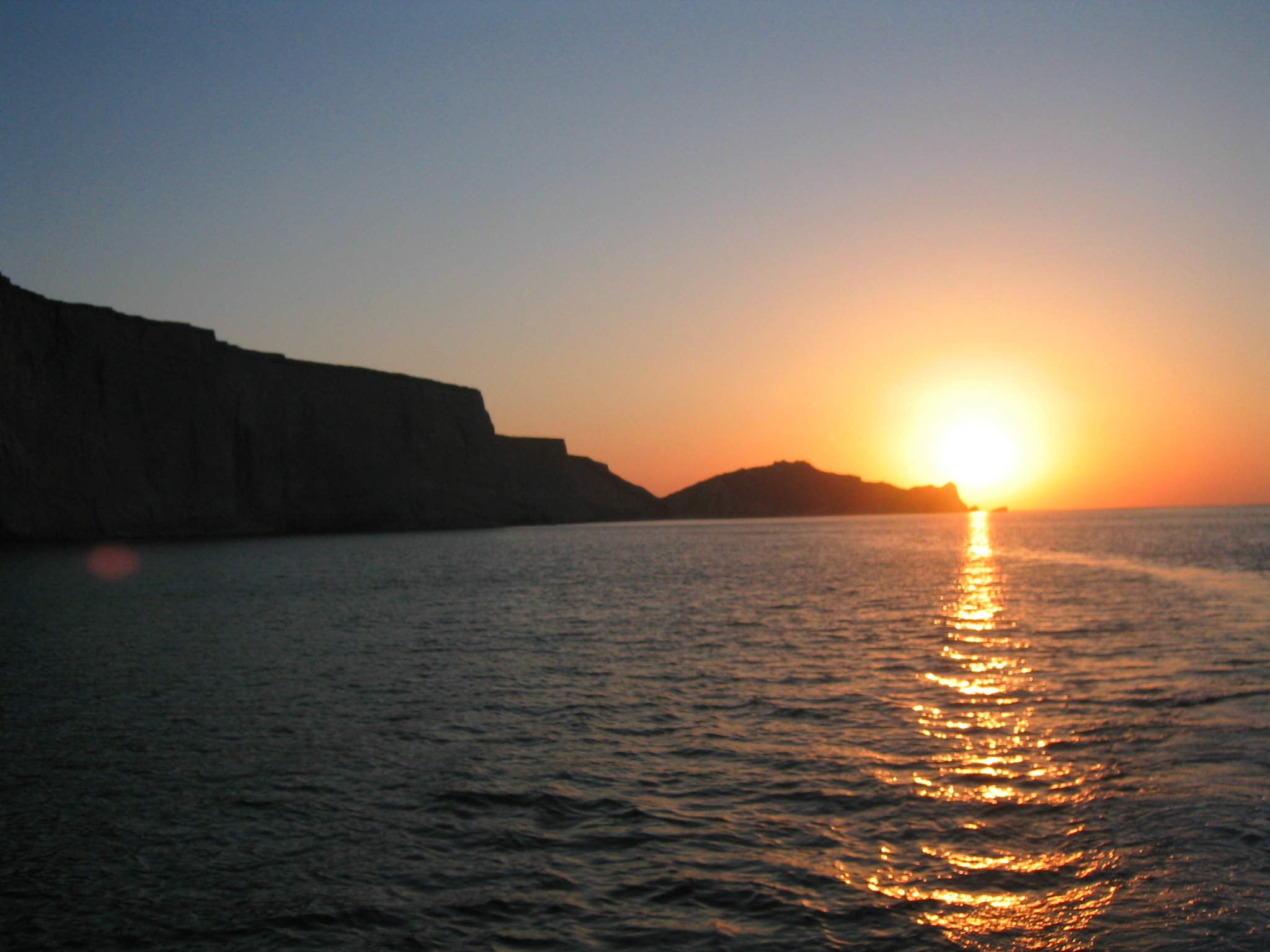

== See also ==
- List of islands of Pakistan
- List of lighthouses in Pakistan
- Protected areas of Pakistan
