= Monze Central =

Constituency of the National Assembly of Zambia

Monze Central is a constituency of the National Assembly of Zambia. It covers the central part of Monze in Monze District of Southern Province.

== List of MPs ==
Election year	MP	Party
Monze
1964	Harry Nkumbula	Zambian African National Congress
1968	Bennie Hamwenda	Zambian African National Congress
1973	Bennie Hamwenda	Zambian African National Congress
1978	Paul Hamanenga	United National Independence Party
1983	Job Michelo	United National Independence Party
1988	Joseph Sichoonga	United National Independence Party
1991	Suresh Desai	Movement for Multi-Party Democracy
1996	Suresh Desai	Movement for Multi-Party Democracy
2001	Jacob Mwiimbu	United Party for National Development
2006	Jacob Mwiimbu	United Party for National Development
2011	Jacob Mwiimbu	United Party for National Development
2016	Jacob Mwiimbu	United Party for National Development
2021	Jacob Mwiimbu	United Party for National Development
Monze Central
2026	Yvonne Shakantu	United Party for National Development
