= The Post (Zambia) =

Former Zambian newspaper

- Type: Daily newspaper
- Format: Tabloid
- Owner: Post Newspapers Ltd.
- Editor: Fred M'membe
- Founded: 1991; 35 years ago
- Political alignment: Left-wing
- Headquarters: Lusaka
- Website: www.postzambia.com

The Post is an independent Zambian newspaper. It was one of the three primary newspapers of the country. The newspaper was set up in 1991. The Sunday edition of the post newspaper was called the Sunday Post and contained a special section focusing on education called Educational Post. The Post was seen to be the most popular and biggest selling newspaper in Zambia according to BBC. The newspaper was closed in 2016 for failure to settle tax obligations in what has been described as a politically motivated move over the paper's frequent criticism of the government.

== History ==
Fred M'membe founded The Post in 1991 as a weekly Lusaka newspaper, along with three co-founders Mike Hall, John Mukela and Matsautso Phiri. As an accountant, M'membe was appointed managing director of Post Newspapers Ltd and tasked with developing the business, while the others focused on editorial content. It soon started publishing countrywide. By 1996, it had started publishing Monday to Friday. By 2000, the newspaper was publishing daily and had become the most politically outspoken newspaper. It is believed to have helped stop the then-president Chiluba from changing the constitution to enable him run for a third term.

In recent years, the post newspaper had become a voice of the people. Many Zambians have expressed views about the government which they wouldn't have expressed in the Zambian-government owned medias. Notable critical writings includes:

- Article by Prof. Muna Ndulo called "The Chansa Kabwela case "a comedy of errors" which has resulted in the post newspaper cited for contempt of the court.
- Article by Roy Clarke. called "Mfuwe" in which the late President Levy Mwanawasa is perceived to have been referred to as Muwelewele (translates: useless). The article was a satirical article. Article saw Roy Clarke indicated for deportation which he successfully contested in court.
- Arrest of Dipak Patel for calling the then president Chiluba a thief, which was published in the Post

The Post has also been involved in wrangles against the Zambian government. In 2001, Fred M'membe was arrested for calling the then president, Chiluba a thief. This case was disposed off by President Levy Patrick Mwanawasa in 2002. In 2005, Fred M'membe was again arrested for defamation charges "following an editorial in which he wrote that Mwanawasa was a man of "foolishness, stupidity, and lack of humility". In 2009, Fred M'membe has been indicated for contempt for publishing an article by Cornell Law School professor Muna Ndulo, titled "The Chansa Kabwela case: a comedy of errors."

As of October 12, 2023, the URL www.postzambia.com does not go to the newspaper website. All links to www.postzambia.com are broken
