= Ras Muari =

Ras Muari Lighthouse
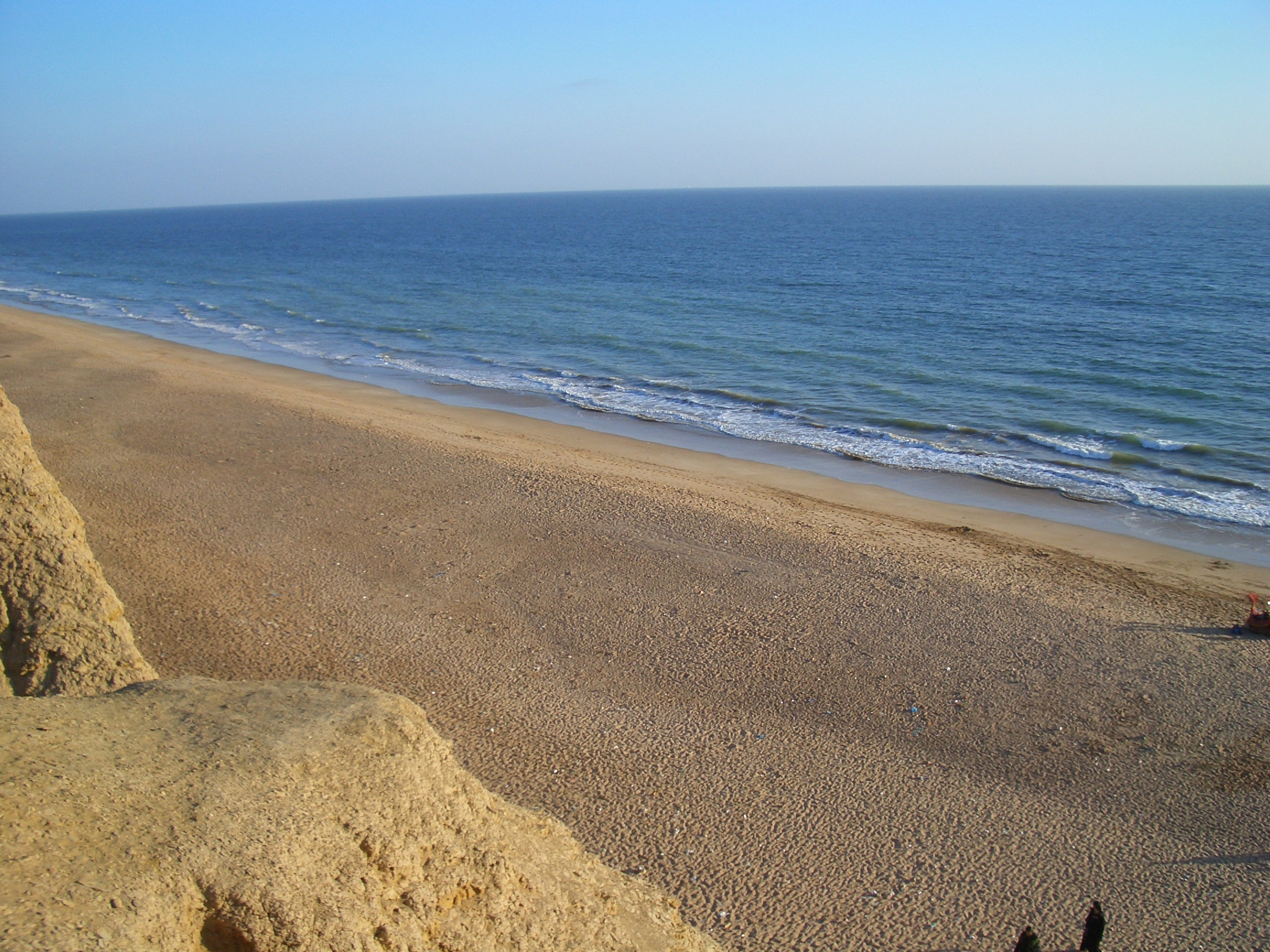
- Cape Monze, Karachi
- Location: Ras Muari, Pakistan
- Coordinates: 24°49′35″N 66°39′52″E

Tower
- Constructed: 1914
- Foundation: concrete base
- Construction: concrete tower
- Height: 48 metres (157 ft)
- Shape: cylindrical tower with balcony and lantern
- Markings: seaward: black and white horizontal bands tower landward: unpainted tower
- Operator: Mercantile Marine Department

Light
- Focal height: 49 m (161 ft)
- Range: 25 nmi (46 km; 29 mi)
- Characteristic: Fl(2) W 10s

Ras Muari, often referred to as Cape Monze, is a beach located off the shore of the Arabian Sea in Karachi. It stretches from the village of Mubarak to Yousuf Goth (Pacha) in West Karachi, Sindh, Pakistan.

== Geography ==
Ras Muari is part of a 25-kilometer coastal belt of rocky and sandy beaches between Mubarak and Yousuf Goth (Pacha). This part of the coast is property of Sindh Revenue Department. Considered a habitat for endangered whale, dolphin, and turtle species, Ras Muari is also a hatching and feeding ground for turtles. In addition, the coastline has a multitude of offshore fish nurseries.

== Lighthouse ==
The Cape Monze lighthouse was constructed in 1914. Active; focal plane 49 m (161 ft); two white flashes every 10 s. 48 m (157 ft) round concrete tower. The seaward side of the tower is painted with black and white horizontal bands; the land side is unpainted. Original 2nd order Fresnel lens in use. Several keeper's houses and other light station buildings.

== See also ==
- List of lighthouses in Pakistan
