= Onesimo Makani Kabweza =

- Born: 1939
- Died: 27 April 1993 (aged 53–54); Zimbabwe
- Occupations: Journalist, Editor
- Known for: Editor of Moto Magazine, critic of the Zimbabwean and Malawian governments
- Spouse: Agnes Matope
- Children: 4
- Awards: MISA Press Freedom Award (1993)

Onesimo Makani Kabweza (1939 – 27 April 1993) was a Zimbabwean journalist and the editor of Moto Magazine in Zimbabwe. He took the lead in giving voice to critics of the Zimbabwean government and Robert Mugabe in the period that followed 1980 independence.

== History ==
Onesimo was a Zimbabwean by birth from Malawian parents. He spent all of his childhood in Zimbabwe, where he also enrolled to become a Catholic priest, a profession he left before qualifying and worked as a writer for Moto magazine. He later went to live in Malawi, the country of his fore-fathers. He married a Malawian wife, Agnes Matope, in 1977 and had four children with her. Being a writer, he was very vocal against the Banda government in Malawi. In 1987 he moved back to Zimbabwe with his family and worked for Mambo Press as the Editor for Moto magazine.

== Career ==
He was editor of Moto from 1987 until his death in a car crash on 27 April 1993. He was working with the Media Institute of Southern Africa at the time of his death and travelling back from Harare. He wanted to organize southern African media workers. He also worked as writer and Editor of Odini, a Malawian newspaper, until he moved back to Zimbabwe in 1978.

== Awards ==
- 1993: MISA Press Freedom Award. The Media Institute of Southern Africa awarded Onesimo its first prize in 1993 for breaking the "culture of silence" in Zimbabwe.
