= Monze District =

Coordinates: 16°00′S 27°15′E

- District
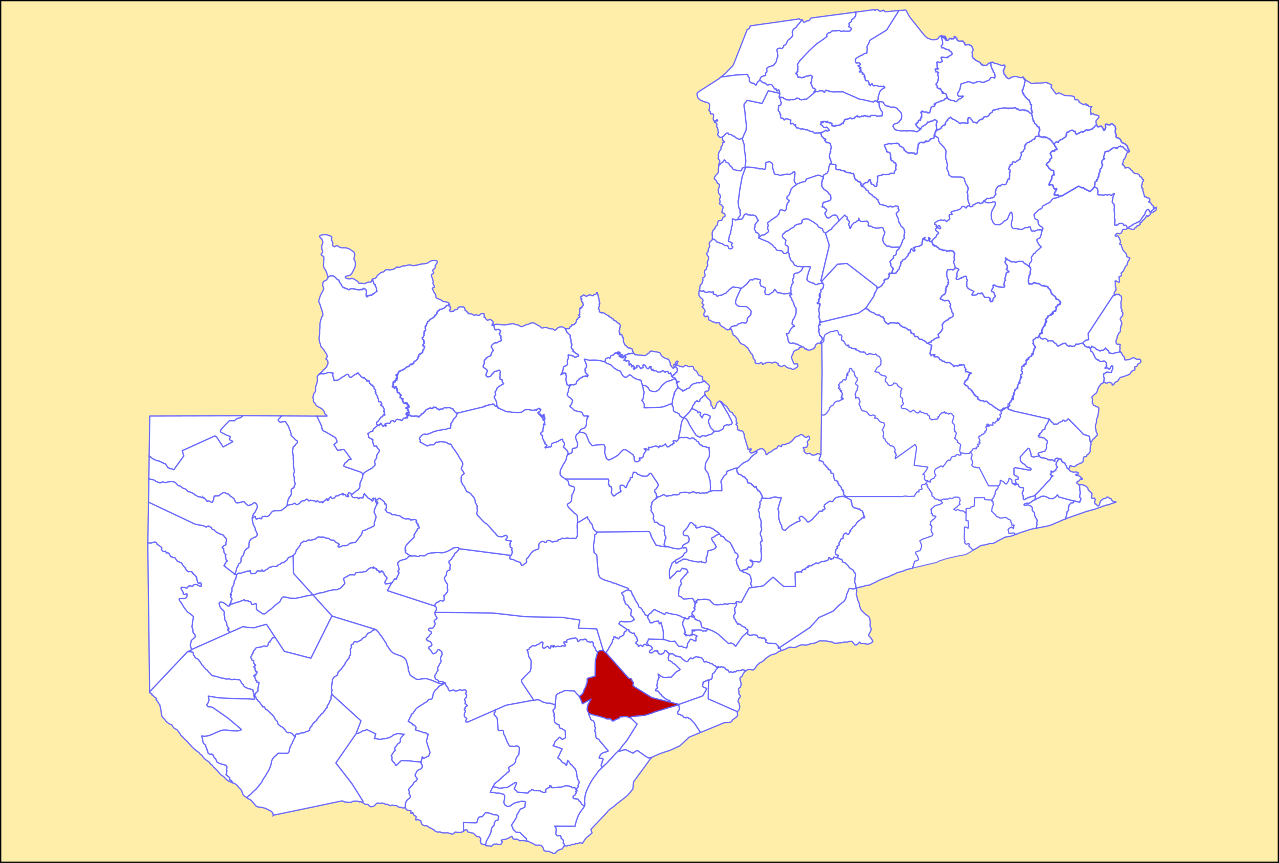
- District location in Zambia
- Country: Zambia
- Province: Southern Province
- Capital: Monze

Government
  - Council Chairperson: Powell Mutenguna

Area
  - Total: 4,770.7 km^{2} (1,842.0 sq mi)

Population (2022)
  - Total: 268,432
  - Density: 56.267/km^{2} (145.73/sq mi)
- Time zone: UTC+2 (CAT)

Monze District is a district of Zambia, located in Southern Province. The capital lies at Monze. As of the 2022 Zambian Census, the district had a population of 268,432 people.

Monze District consists of three constituencies, namely Monze, Bweengwa and Moomba.
