= Monze =

- Town
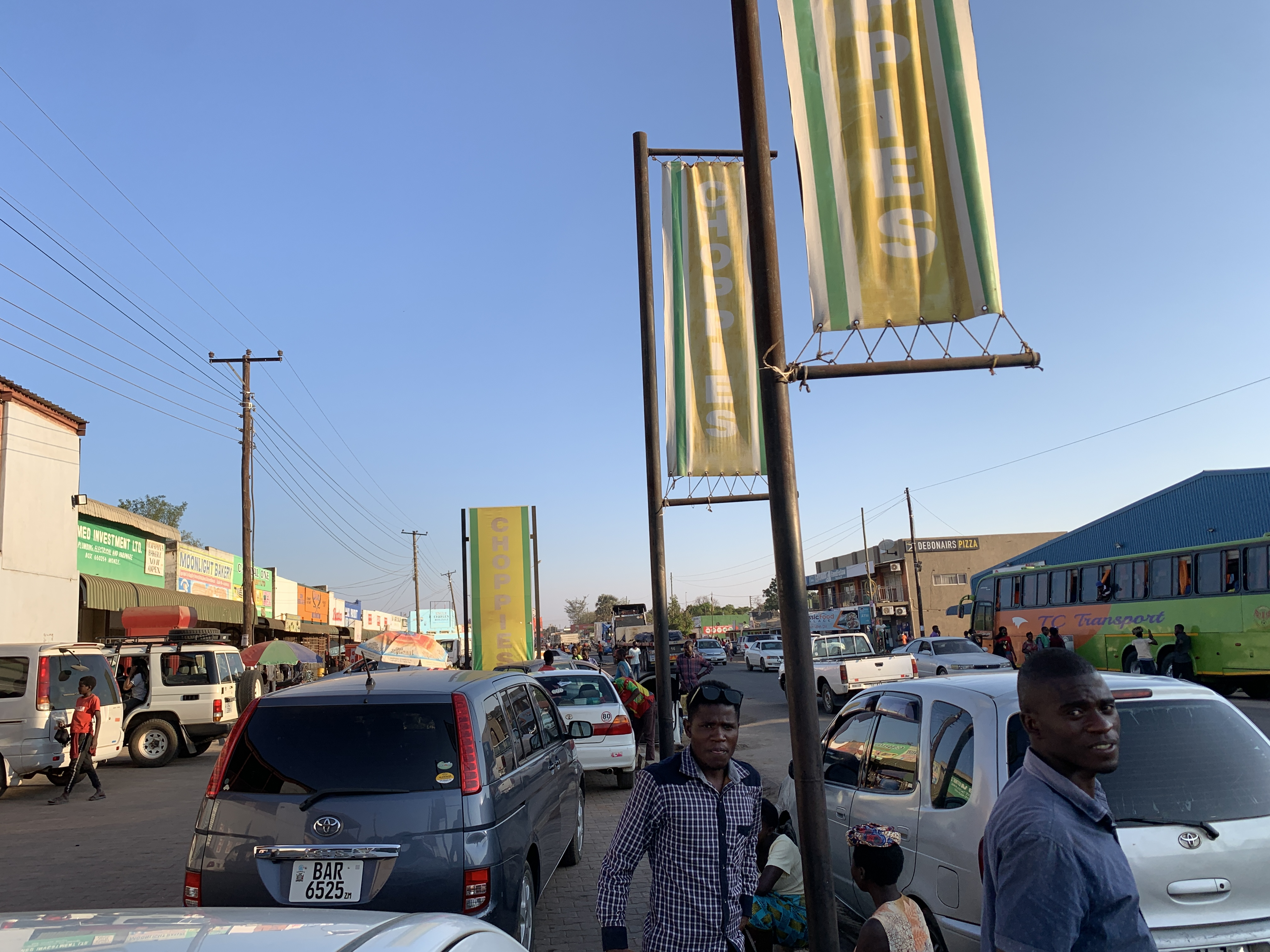
- Nickname: M Town
- Location within Zambia
- Coordinates: 16°17′0″S 27°29′0″E
- Country: Zambia
- Province: Southern Province
- District: Monze District
- Time zone: UTC+2 (CAT)
- Climate: Cwa

Monze is a prominent town in the Southern Province of Zambia, with a population of 268,432 according to the 2022 census. It is located about 180 kilometers south-west of Lusaka. It serves as the administrative center for the Monze District.

The town is named after Chief Monze, widely acknowledged as the spiritual leader of the Tonga people who inhabit the district. His palace is south of the town near a place called Gonde where a ceremony called Lwiindi takes place. This annual festival is a thanksgiving ceremony which attracts many people from around the country.

Monze is a rapidly urbanising town with growth extending along the railway line and T1 highway. The town is divided into neighbourhoods, known locally as "compounds". There is a substantial open-air market in Monze and a small but growing range of agri-dealerships, shops, bars and restaurants.

== History ==
=== Early History ===
The Monze area has a long record of human settlement at the Gwisho Hot Springs.

=== Colonial Era ===
In 1898, one of the first police posts in Northern Rhodesia was established at Fort Monze, south-west of the town. Six soldiers stationed there who died of blackwater fever are buried in the fort's cemetery. Fort Monze is now a national monument, though only ruins and a plaque remain. Missionary activity began in the early 20th century. In July 1905, the Jesuit mission at Chikuni and the Seventh-Day Adventist mission at Rusangu were established within a few kilometers of each other on the Tonga Plateau. During World War II, fifty Polish refugees escaping from German- and Soviet-occupied Poland, were admitted in Monze in 1941.

=== Post-Independence ===
Monze Mission Hospital was established in 1964, the year of Zambia's independence and later became a general hospital run by the Sisters of the Holy Spirit. In 2005, President Levy Mwanawasa visited Rusangu Mission to mark the centenary of the Seventh-Day Adventist Church's work in Zambia.

== Higher education ==
Monze is home to Rusangu University, a private Christian University owned and run by the Seventh-Day Adventist Church. It is based at Rusangu Mission near the town and was formerly called Zambia Adventist University. The mission itself was founded in 1905 on the Monze plateau by the American missionary William Harrison Anderson. Over the following decades it grew to include primary and secondary schools.

The Monze area also hosts several non-university tertiary institutions. Charles Lwanga College of Education was founded by the Jesuits in 1959 and lies with Chikuni Mission.

== Religion ==
The town has a significant Seventh-day Adventist Church presence.

== Tourism ==
Monze's main tourist attraction are wildlife and wetland areas to the west of the town, archaeological and colonial heritage sites, and Tonga cultural events.

=== Lochinvar National Park ===
The town is the main access point for Lochinvar National Park.

Lochinvar is part of the Kafue Flats, which were designated a Ramsar Convention wetland of international importance.

== See also ==
- List of populated places in Zambia
