= Sika Wo Ntaban (fabric) =

Common materials used for clothing in West Africa

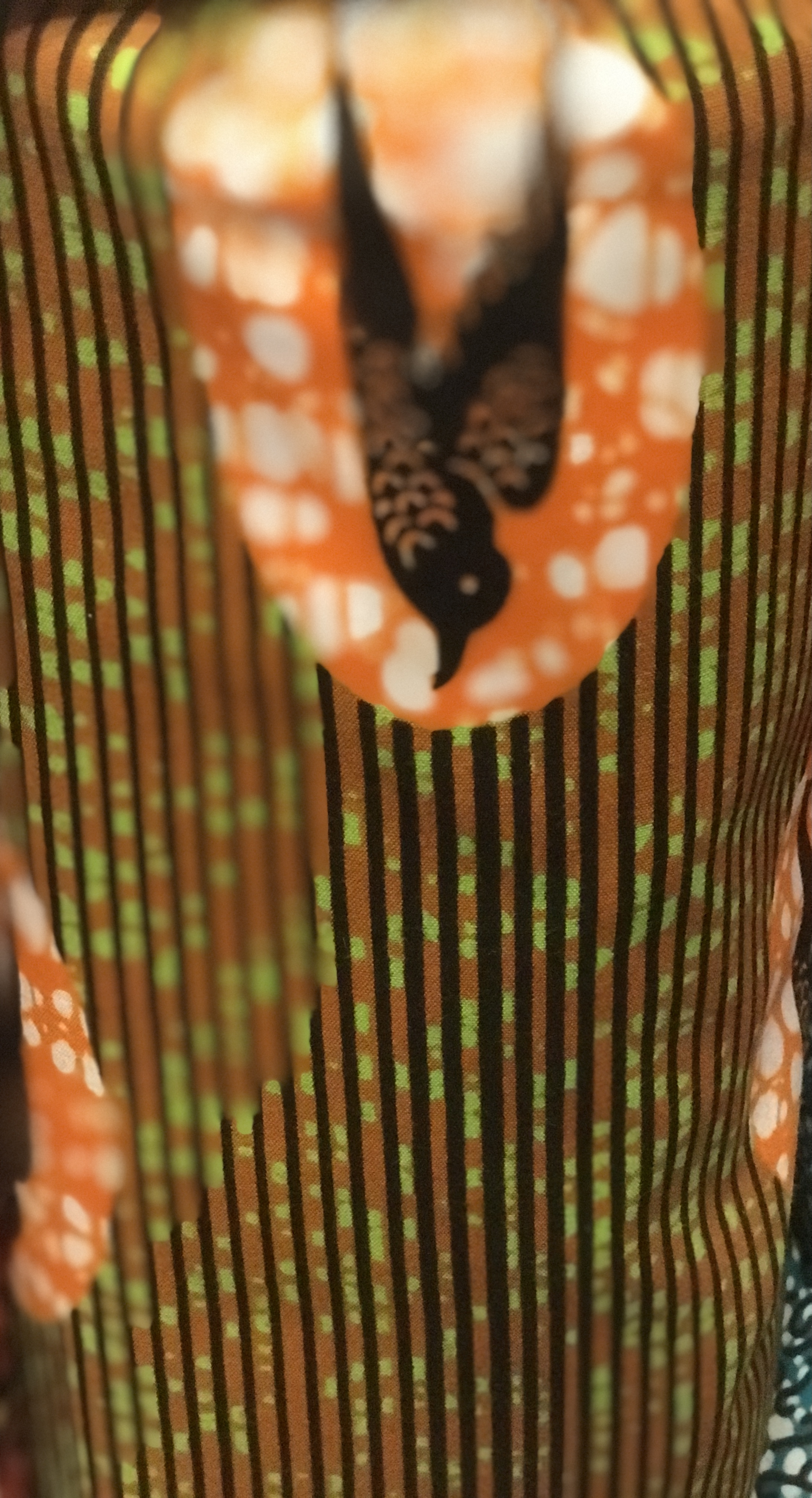
This is an image of a fabric design by name Sika Wɔ Ntaban or Air Afrique. It is printed by both VLISCO and Akosombo Textiles Limited (ATL) in Ghana.

Sika Wɔ Ntaban is the Ghanaian given name for a fabric print found in Ghana, Togo and Nigeria. This fabric is produced by Ghana Textiles Company(GTP) under VLISCO and Akosombo Industrial Company Limited formerly called Akosombo Textiles Limited(ATL).

== Background ==
The Ghanaian given name translates into English as 'Money has wings' or 'Money can fly like a Bird'. This name is borrowed from a Ghanaian proverb which is explained as money is not permanent and can be lost if not handled properly. The fabric is known as Speed Bird in English.

== Design ==
The fabric's design components includes a colored motif with lines and a flying bird on a plain or colored background in an oval shape. The colored motif comes in a variety of colors such as blue, yellow and green whereas the colored background of the bird comes in a variety of red, white and yellow backgrounds.

== Other names ==
The fabric is known by other names in other African countries. It is known by the name Air Afrique in Togo because it is used as the official uniform of a local airline company. In Nigeria it is known by the Igbo name Eneke which means that if hunters have mastered the art of shooting accurately then bird will master the art of flying without perching.

== Fabric Usage ==
This fabric design is used for clothing as well as for making personal items such as head scarves and makeup bags.

== See also ==
- Ahwenepa nkasa
- L’Oeil de Boeuf (fabric)
- African wax prints
- Wrapper (clothing)
- Shweshwe
- Kitenge
