= Ahwenepa nkasa =

Common materials used for clothing in West Africa

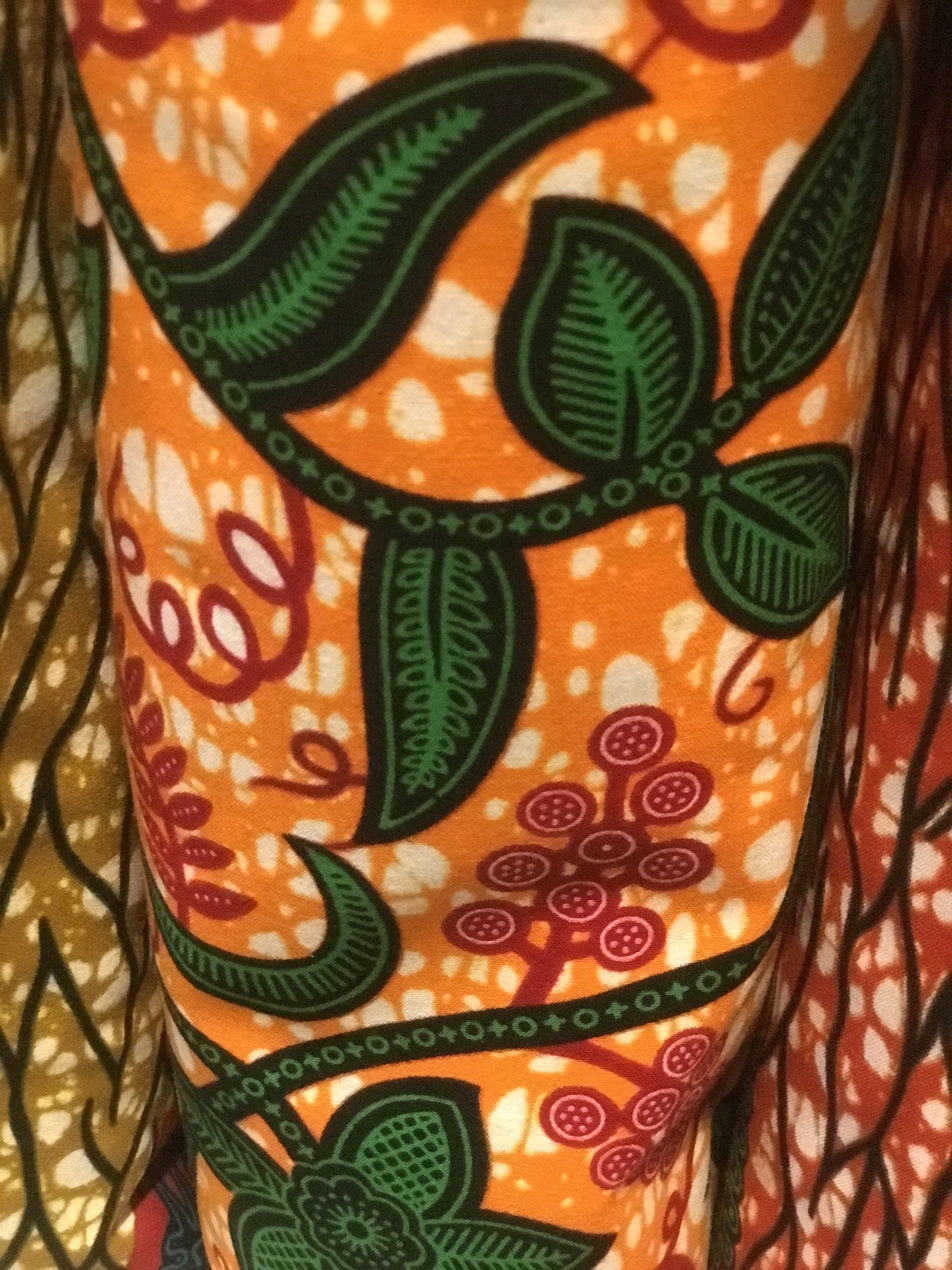
Ahwenepa Nkasa Fabric

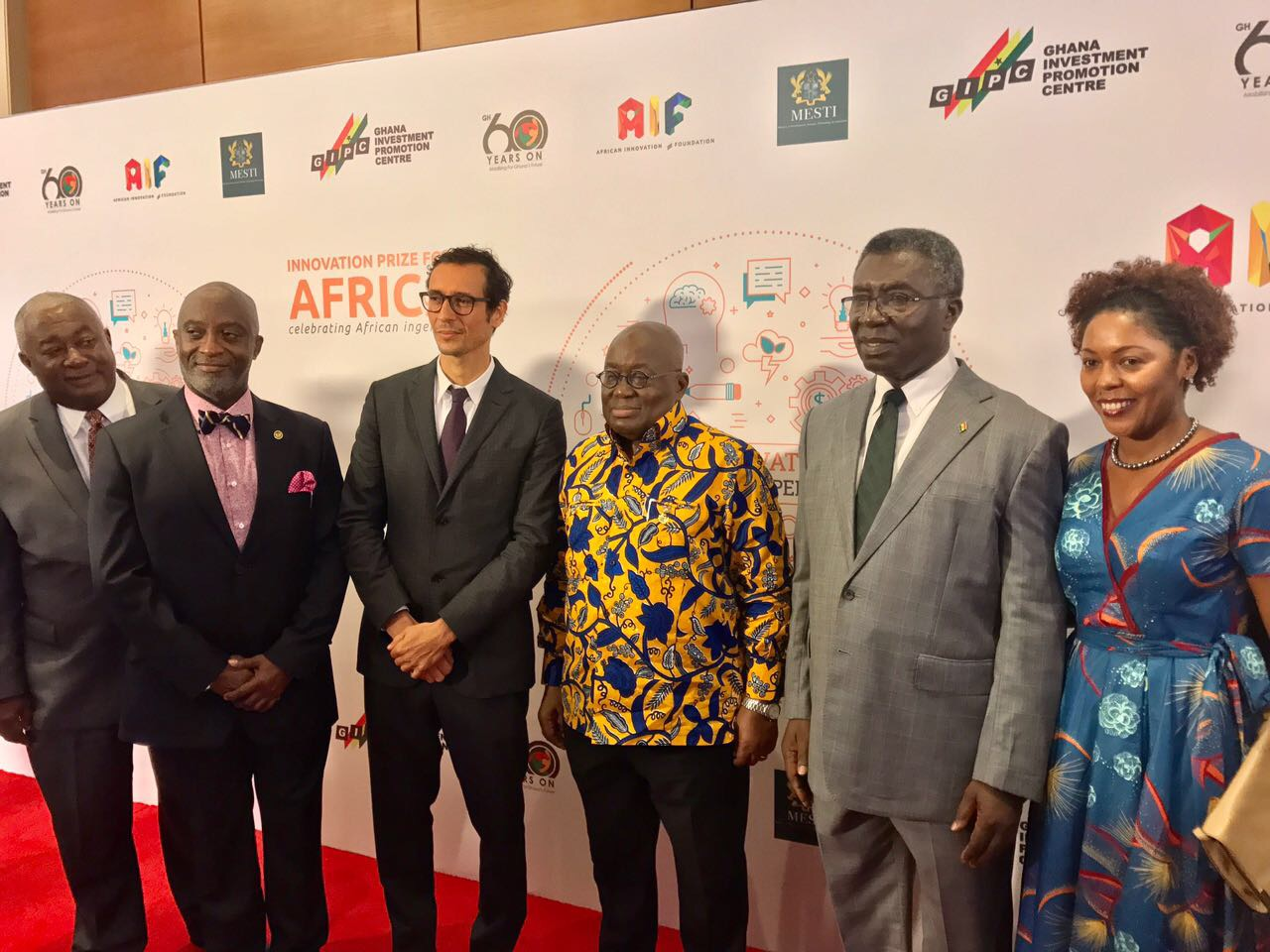
President Nana Akufo-Addo and Minister Kwabena Frimpong Boateng

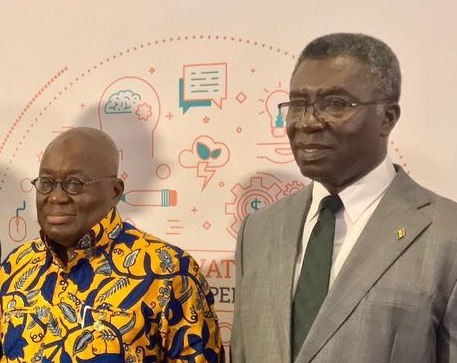
President Nana Akufo-Addo and Minister Kwabena Frimpong Boateng (cropped)

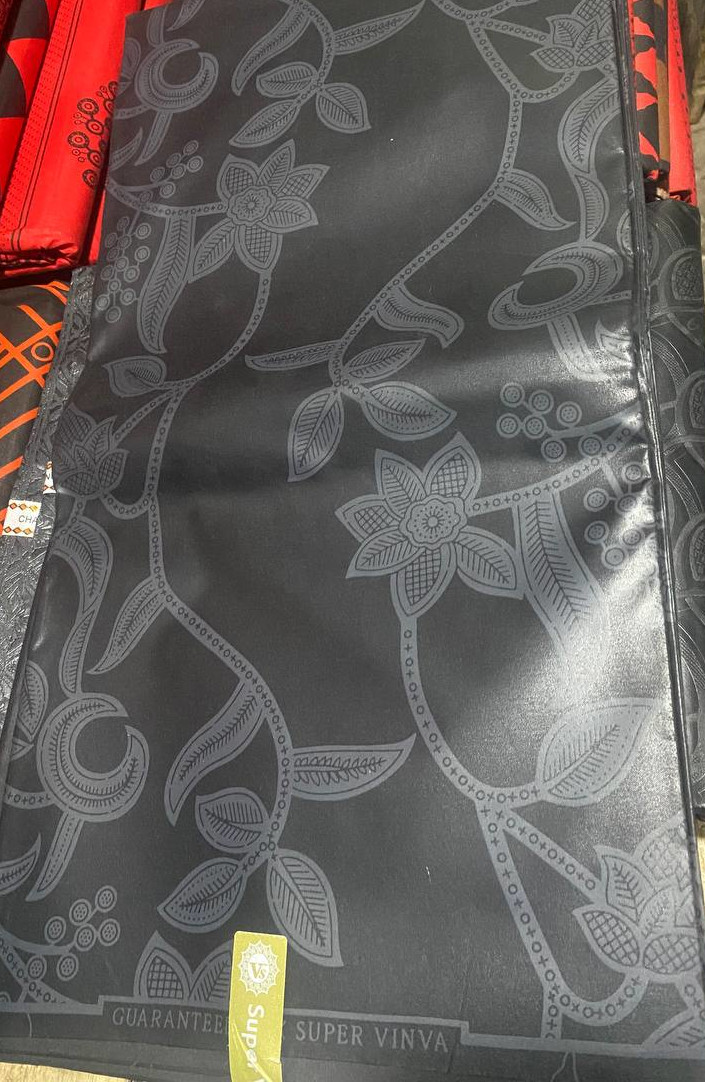
This is an image of the funeral cloth of the fabric design with the Ghanaian Akan given name 'Ahwenepa nkasa'.

Ahwenepa nkasa is the Ghanaian given name for a fabric print found in Ghana, Togo, Benin and the Ivory Coast. This fabric is produced by Ghana Textiles Company (GTP) under VLISCO and Akosombo Industrial Company Limited, formerly called Akosombo Textile Limited (ATL). This fabric design is considered a classic design in West Africa just as other designs like L’Oeil de Boeuf and Sika wo ntaban.

== Background ==
The Ghanaian name is made up of two Akan words Ahwenepa and nkasa which translate into English as Good waist beads do not make noise and can be likened to the proverb "Empty barrels make the most noise". The proverb is speaking about how a good person never boasts about his good deeds.

== Design ==
The fabric's design components include a colorful floral pattern and lines - including curved, diagonal, and spiral lines. In Ghana the different colours of this pattern are used for different occasions. The blue main motif is used by women after delivery, the black fabric of this design is used for funerals and the more colorful prints for other occasions and wear in daily life.

== Other names ==
The fabric is known by other names in other African countries. It is known by the name Makaïva in Togo and Benin and means leaves of a tree. In the Ivory Coast it is known as Feuille-feuille also meaning leaves in tree.

== Notable usage ==
This fabric design is used by notable personalities such as the president of Ghana, Nana Addo Dankwa Akuffo-Addo. He wore this print when he gave his acceptance speech when conferred with an honorary degree by the University of Cape Coast (UCC) and when he commissioned a fertilizer factory in Ghana. He also wore this fabric design when he attended the 7th Innovation prize for Africa by the African Innovation Foundation (AIF).

== See also ==
- L’Oeil de Boeuf (fabric)
- Sika Wo Ntaban (fabric)
- African wax prints
- Wrapper (clothing)
- Shweshwe
- Kitenge
