= Inspector General of Police (Zambia) =

Head of Zambia Police Service body

Inspector General of The Zambia Police Service
- Incumbent; Graphel Musamba since 14 April 2023
- Zambia Police Service
- Style: Inspector General
- Abbreviation: IG
- Member of: • Zambia Police Service; • National Security Council
- Reports to: • Minister of Home Affairs; • The President of Zambia
- Residence: Zambia Police Headquarters, Lusaka, Zambia
- Appointer: President of Zambia
- Constituting instrument: Constitution of Zambia
- Formation: 1964
- First holder: Fabiano Chela

The Inspector General of Police, abbreviated as IG is the head of the Zambia Police Service. He is the senior officer in the police service. The current IG is Graphel Musamba.

== List of IGs ==
- Mr. Fabiano Chela – (1973–1978)
- Mr. Chrispin Katukula – (1978–1979)
- Mr. Fabiano Chela – (1979–1983)
- Mr. Hebert Mapili – (1983 —1985)
- Mr. Henry Mtonga – (1985–1989)
- Mr. Joshua Konayuma - (1989–1990)
- Mr. Zunga Siakalima – (1990–1991)
- Mr. Darius Kalebo – (1991–1994)
- Mr. Francis Ndlovu – (1994–2000)
- Mr. Silas Ngangula – (2000–2002)
- Mr. Francis Musonda – (2002–2003)
- Mr. Zunga Siakalima – (2003–2006)
- Mr. Ephraim Mateyo – (2006–2008)
- Mr. Francis Kabonde – (2008–2011)
- Dr. Martin Malama – (2011–2012)
- Ms. Stella Libongani – (2012–2016)
- Mr. Kakoma Kanganja – (2016–2021)
- Mr. Remmy Kajoba - (2021–2023)
- Mr. Graphel Musamba - (2023 - date)
