= L'Oeil de Boeuf (fabric) =

Common materials used for clothing in West Africa

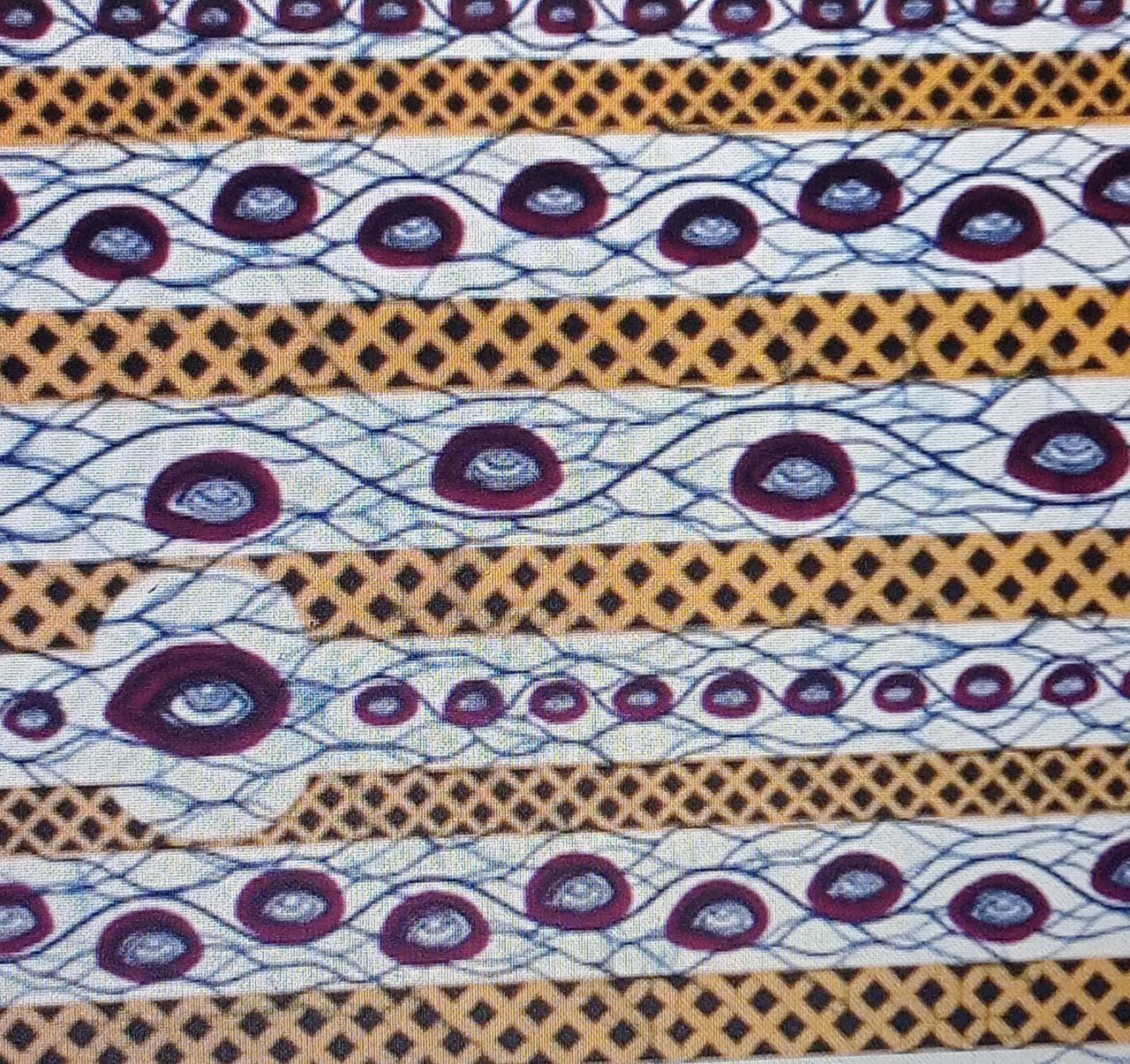
West African Fabric

L’Oeil de Boeuf is the given name for a fabric design found in West African fabric markets produced by VLISCO. This fabric design is considered a classic design in West Africa just as other designs like Ahwenepa Nkasa and Sika wo ntaban.

== Background ==
L’Oeil de Boeuf is a French term meaning Bull's Eye in English. The fabric is known by this name in francophone west African countries because of the image of eyes in the design. In Benin it is known as “Lisu ya Pité”. It is said that this name inferred as Lustful Eye means that females can profess their desire for males by wearing this fabric print.

The design is simply known as Eyes in Nigeria. In Ghana it is known by the Akan name Aniwa which means Eyes in English. In Ghana it has the metaphorical meaning of being watchful of our actions as other people watch on as we act. It is also explained as the Eyes of God.

== Design ==
This fabric design is found in various colors. There are motifs in green, pink and yellow. The design is made up of images of eyes with wavy lines.

== See also ==
- African wax prints
- Wrapper (clothing)
- Shweshwe
- Kitenge
