= Baganda clothing =

The Kiganda clothing or the clothing of the Baganda has changed over the centuries, from goatskins to barkcloth and modern fabrics like silk, cotton, etc. Similar changes have happened to the attire worn by the Baganda, from the traditional kanzu and gomesi to more modern Western attire.

== Traditional dress ==
The traditional dress of Baganda women is the gomesi.

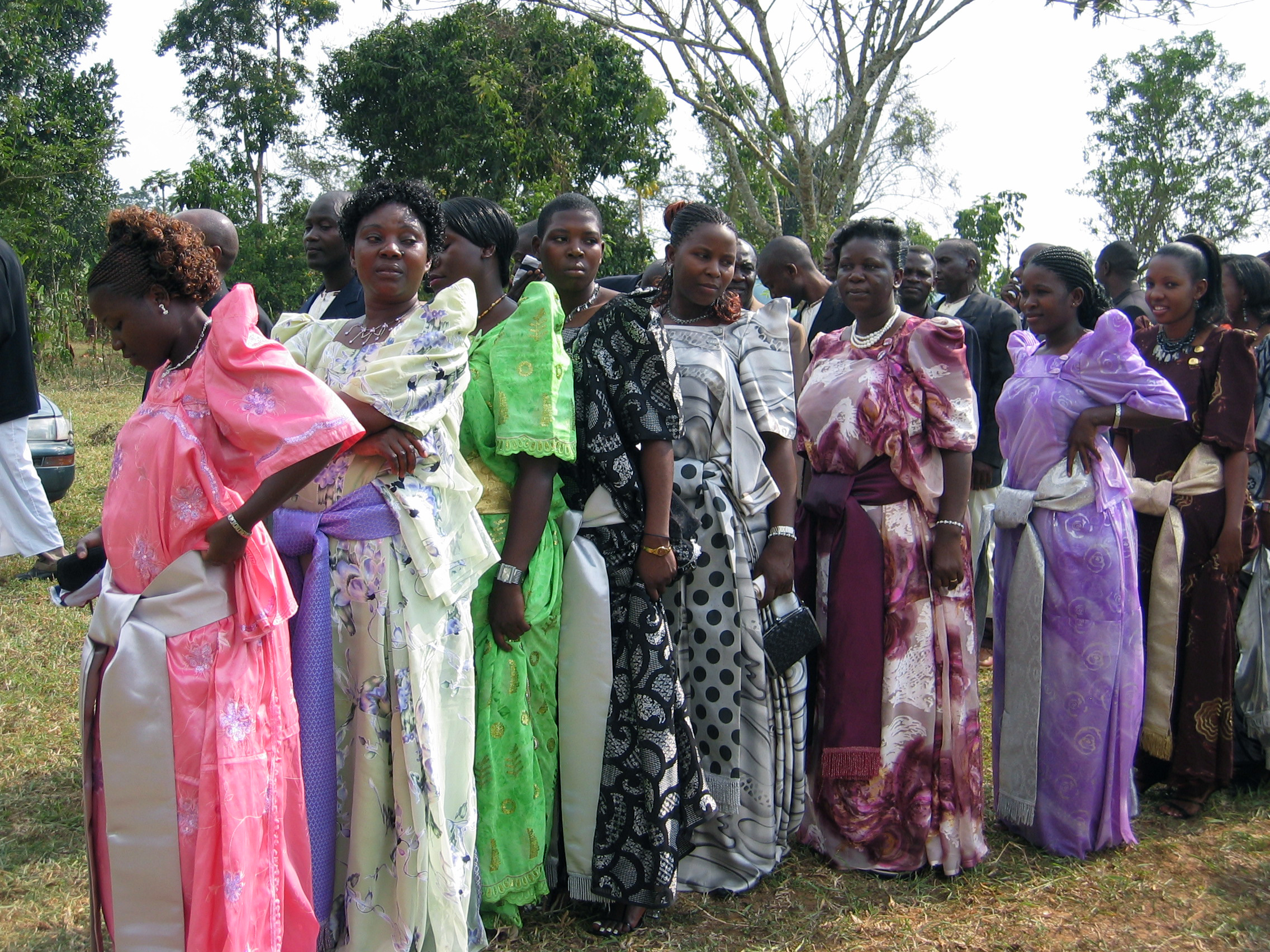
Women wearing gomesi at a wedding in Kampala, Uganda.

The traditional wear for the Baganda men is the kanzu.

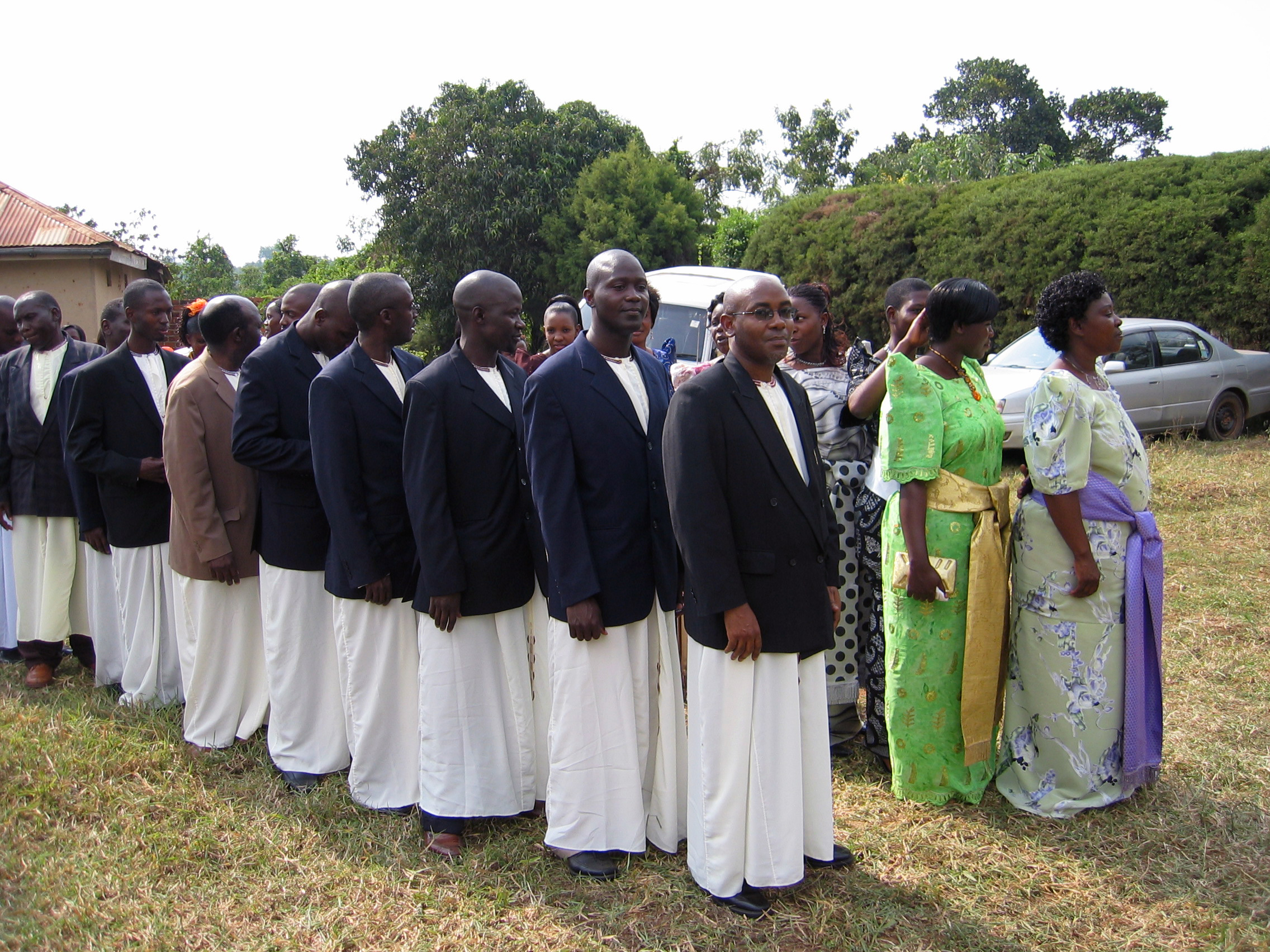
Men wearing kanzus at a wedding in Kampala, Uganda.

== Other dress ==
The other popular dress for the Baganda, especially women, is the leesu. This is usually wrapped around the waist like a sarong or used as a mat to sit on. The leesu is usually made from leso or kanga fabric.

== Traditional textile ==
The (traditional) textile invented by the Baganda is barkcloth (lubugo in Luganda). The lubugo is made from the bark of the mutuba tree (Ficus Natalensis).

== Other fabrics ==
The other popular fabric for the Baganda, especially women, is the kikooyi.

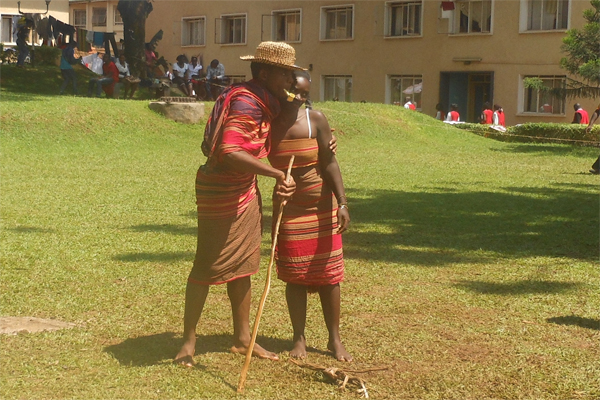
Man and woman wearing bikooyi.

The kitengi (or bitengi in plural) are popular among Baganda men and women.

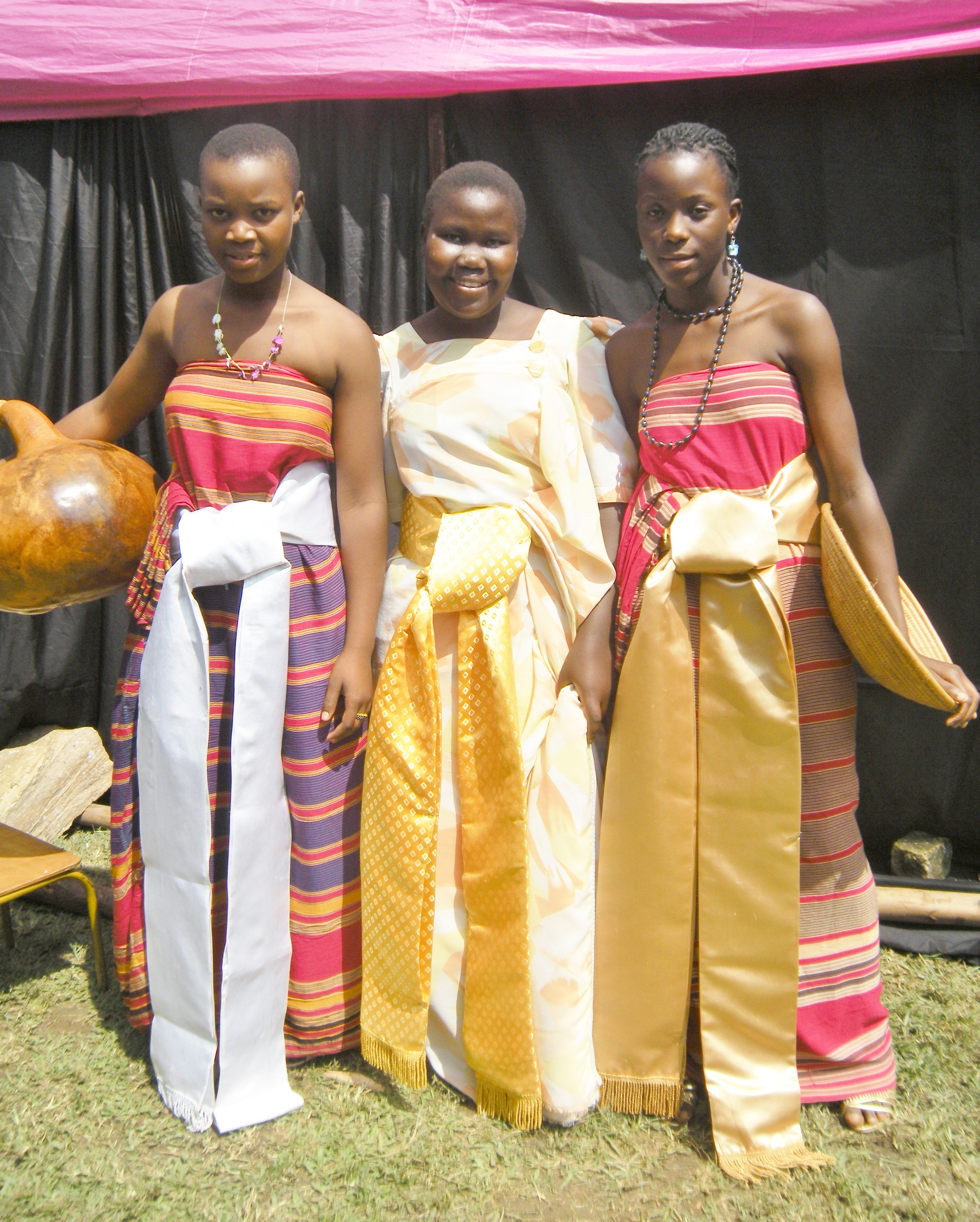
Two girls wearing bikooyi and one wearing a Gomesi.
