= Victoria Kalima =

Zambian politician (1972–2018)

Minister of Gender
- In office 6 October 2016 – 11 June 2018
- President: Edgar Lungu
- Preceded by: Nkandu Luo
- Succeeded by: Elizabeth Phiri

Member of the National Assembly for Kasenengwa
- In office 2011 – 11 June 2018
- Preceded by: Vera Tembo
- Succeeded by: Sensio Banda

Personal details
- Born: 4 October 1972 Kitwe, Zambia
- Died: 11 June 2018 (aged 45) Lusaka, Zambia
- Party: MMD (until 2016); Patriotic Front (2016–2018)

Victoria Kalima Phiri (4 October 1972 – 11 June 2018) was a Zambian politician who was Minister of Gender and member of the National Assembly for Kasenengwa from 2016 and 2011, respectively, till her death.

== Early life ==
Kalima was born on 4 October 1972 at Kitwe, the third child of Mustered and Evelyn Kalima. She attended Kabale Primary School and Lwitikila Girls School in Mpika. She studied for an MBA at Cavendish University in Lusaka and also gained diplomas in agricultural business management and international relations. She then started a company from scratch, plant agr-chem services, growing it to one of the best agro dealerships in Zambia.

== Career ==
Kalima worked as a business administrator for the Zambia Cooperate Federation in Lusaka from 1994 to 1998. In 1999, she established and was CEO of her own company, Plant Agri-Chem.

Kalima was selected as the Movement for Multi-Party Democracy candidate for the Kasenengwa constituency for the 2011 general elections. Although she was elected to the National Assembly with a majority of over 17,500, she was later criticised by Ngoni Chief Madzimawe for not visiting her constituency enough. Her victory in the elections was overturned in the Supreme Court in December 2013 on the basis that she had given out bicycles and chitenge material to voters and claimed that the Patriotic Front would kill old people and stop the distribution of antiretroviral drugs. Kalima was re-selected as the MMD candidate and contested the 2014 by-election, in which she was returned to the National Assembly with a reduced majority of 7,452.

After being re-elected, she joined the Committee on Government Assurances and the Committee on Legal Affairs, Human Rights, National Guidance, Gender Matters and Governance. During the 2015 presidential elections she campaigned for Hakainde Hichilema of the United Party for National Development, leading to most local councillors in Kasenengwa saying that they would seek to ensure she lost her seat in the general elections the following year.

Prior to the 2016 general elections Kalima called for an alliance between the MMD and Patriotic Front. Despite previously criticising other MMD politicians for doing so, she later defected to the Patriotic Front and was nominated as the party's candidate in Kasenengwa in the elections. She was re-elected to the National Assembly with a 9,259 vote majority. Following the elections she was appointed Minister of Gender.

In 2012 she defended the rights of journalists who got detained and whose cameras were confiscated. In 2017 she became an activist against gender inequality and child marriages. The same year she also proposed a revised version of Marriage Bill which will ban any marriages between a man and a woman until both are at least 21 years of age.

== Personal life ==
Kalima was a widow, and the goddaughter of former President Rupiah Banda. She had two children and was a devout Christian. Kalima died at Maina Soko Military Hospital in Lusaka on 11 June 2018 at the age of 45.
