= Graphel Musamba =

Zambian inspector-general of police (born 1965)

19th Inspector General of Police
- Incumbent
- Assumed office April 14, 2023
- Preceded by: Remmy Kajoba

Personal details
- Born: 5 September 1965 (age 61) Lusaka, Zambia
- Education: University of Zambia; Zambia Police College
- Occupation: Police officer

Graphel Musamba (born September 5, 1965) is a Zambian police officer who is the current and 19th Inspector General of Police.

== Career ==
On April 14, 2023, President Hichilema appointed Musamba to replace Remmy Kajoba as Inspector General of the Zambia Police Service.
