= Rubanda-Mayonza =

Ugandan fashion designer

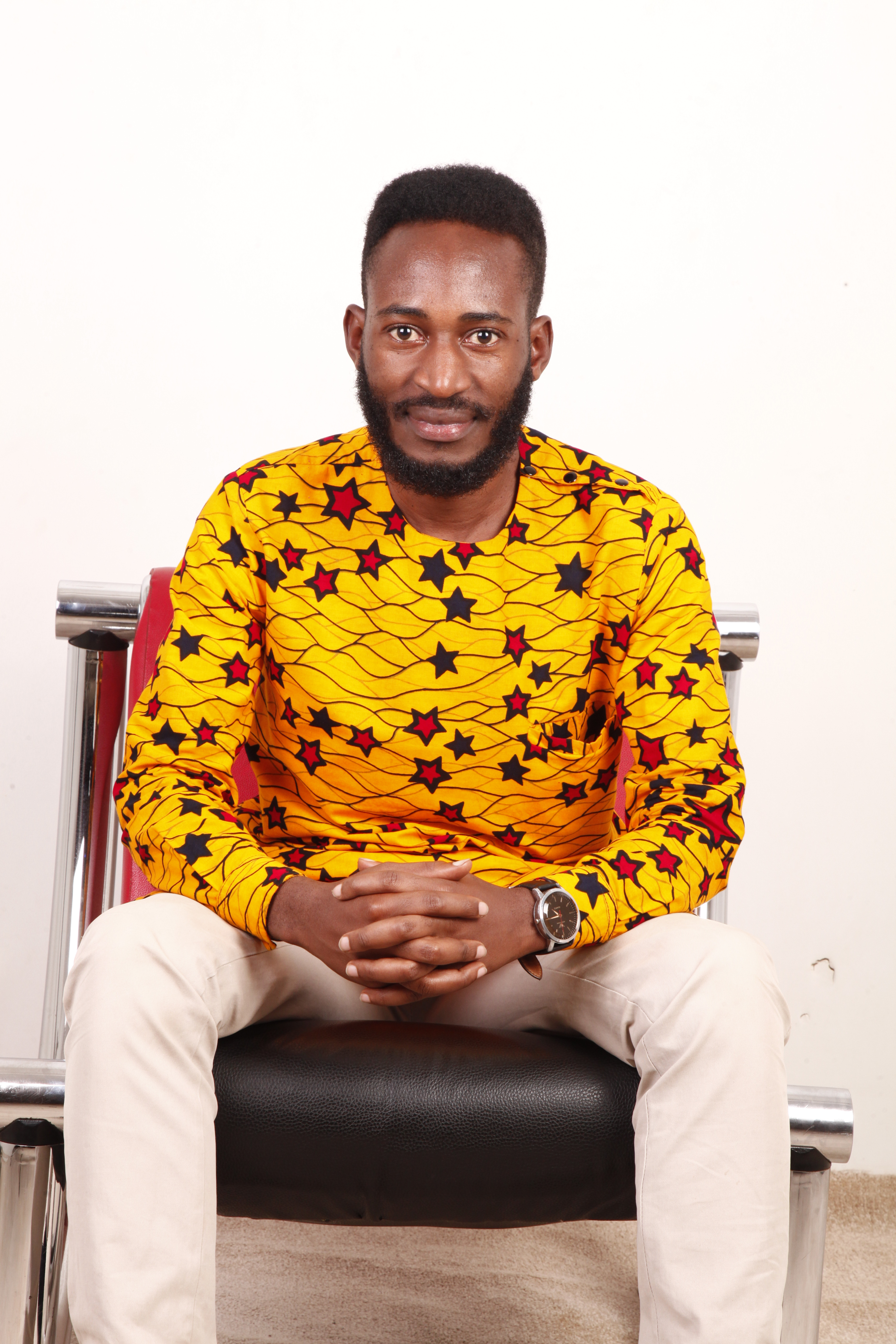
- Citizenship: Uganda
- Education: Makerere University (Nutritionist)
- Occupations: Fashion designer & fashion entrepreneur
- Years active: 2015–present
- Known for: Fashion Design, E-commerce Fashion Distributor
- Title: Chair & CEO; Rubanda-Mayonza Fashion
- Website: rubanda-mayonza.com

Rubanda-Mayonza, also known as Rutabatiina Mwene Busingye Emanzi Etahunga, is a Ugandan fashion designer, business man and entrepreneur. He is the founder of Rubanda Mayonza fashion, an e-commerce African fashion brand in Uganda.

== Early life and education ==
Rubanda Mayonza went to Ntare school in Mbarara for his O-level and A-level education. In 2013 he joined Makerere University and in 2018 graduated with a bachelor of science degree in Human nutrition. It's while at Makerere university that his interest for fashion and modeling started taking shape as he started participating in fashion shows around campus.

At Makerere, he headed a pan African youth frontier organization known as Waharakati Africa. His Pan African stance is reflected in his approach to fashion. Towards the end of his University days, he set out to bring more fashion into the African tunic(Bitenge) by designing Pan African themed fashion wear.

== Business and career ==
Rubanda mayonza started his fashion career by founding a chain of african themed online fashion stores on e-commerce sites in Kampala Uganda in 2015. In 2017, he began designing T-shirts for his men's wear line on his Jumia online shop. His fashion line later expanded into women's clothing and other accessories like, caps, sweaters and jackets.

Rubanda-Mayonza’s collections are often influenced by the fashion of Pan Africanists and Ugandan subcultures and marketed in connection with pan Africanism. He is the owner and the company's principal designer, leading the design teams and overseeing the entire creative process.
