= Gerry Chanda =

Zambian military pilot and politician (1946–2021)

Member of the National Assembly for Kanyama
- In office 2008–2016
- Preceded by: Henry Mtonga
- Succeeded by: Elizabeth Phiri

Deputy Minister of Home Affairs
- In office 2015–2016

Minister for Muchinga Province
- In office 2013–2015
- President: Michael Sata
- Succeeded by: Mwimba Malama

Minister for Northern Province
- In office 2012–2013

Minister for Lusaka Province
- In office 2011–2012

Personal details
- Born: 28 April 1946 Northern Rhodesia
- Died: 11 July 2021 (aged 75) Lusaka, Zambia
- Party: Patriotic Front
- Profession: Pilot

Gerry Chanda (28 April 1946 – 11 July 2021) was a Zambian military pilot and politician. He served as Member of the National Assembly for Kanyama from 2008 until 2016 and held several ministerial positions.

== Biography ==
Chanda served in the Zambian Air Force, reaching the rank of general. After leaving the military, he entered politics and was the Patriotic Front candidate in a by-election in Kanyama on 21 February 2008, following the death of incumbent MP and Patriotic Front member Henry Mtonga. Chanda was subsequently elected to the National Assembly with a majority of 441 votes.

Chanda was re-elected in the 2011 general elections, increasing his majority to over 10,000. Following the elections, he was appointed Minister for Lusaka Province. He subsequently became Minister for Northern Province in November 2012 and then Minister for Muchinga Province in March 2013. In 2015 he was appointed Deputy Minister of Home Affairs.

Although Chanda applied to stand as the Patriotic Front candidate in the 2016 general elections, the party chose Elizabeth Phiri as its candidate.

Chanda died at the Maina Soko Medical Centre in Lusaka on 11 July 2021.
