= Second Lungu Cabinet =

- 14th Cabinet of Zambia

- Composition of the National Assembly
- Date formed: 13 September 2016
- Date dissolved: 24 August 2021

People and organisations
- President: Edgar Lungu
- President's history: Former Ministry of Defence of Zambia
- Deputy President: Inonge Wina
- No. of ministers: 33
- Member party: Patriotic Front (PF) Movement for Multi-Party Democracy (MMD)
- Status in legislature: National Assembly
- Opposition party: United Party for National Development (UPND)
- Opposition leader: Hakainde Hichilema (2016-2021)

History
- Election: 2016 Zambian general election
- Predecessor: First Lungu Cabinet
- Successor: Hichilema Cabinet

The Second Lungu Cabinet is the 14th cabinet of Zambia and Second cabinet of President Edgar Lungu from 2016 to 2021. It consisted of 33 Cabinet Members: 32 Ministers and 1 Ex officio member.

== List ==
=== Key ===
Party key	Patriotic Front	Movement for Multi-Party Democracy (MMD)

=== Minister's ===
Cabinet of Zambia
Portrait	Portfolio	Incumbent
	President; Commander-in-chief of the Armed Forces	H.E. Edgar Lungu
	Vice President of Zambia	H.E. Inonge Wina
	Minister of Chiefs and Traditional Affairs	Lawrence John Sichalwe
	Minister of Justice	Given Lubinda
	Minister of Lands and Natural Resources	Jean Kapata
	Minister of Home Affairs	Stephen Kampyongo
	Minister of Defense	Davies Chama
	Minister of Labour and Social Security	Joyce Nonde Simukoko
	Minister of Presidential Affairs	Chomba Freedom Sikazwe
	Minister of Religious Affairs and National Guidance	Godfridah Nsenduluka Sumaili
	Minister of Foreign Affairs	Joseph Malanji
	Minister of National Development and Planning	Alexander Chiteme
	Minister of Energy	Matthew Nkhuwa
	Minister of Commerce, Trade and Industry	Christopher Bwalya Yaluma
	Minister of Mines and Minerals Development	Richard Musukwa
	Minister of Information and Broadcasting	Dora Siliya
	Minister of Agriculture	Micheal Zondani Jay Katambo
	Minister of Finance	Bwalya Ng'andu
	Minister of Youth, Sport and Child Development	Emmanuel Mulenga
	Minister of Higher Education	Brian Mushimba
	Minister of Fisheries and Livestock	Nkandu Luo
	Minister of Community Development and Social Welfare	Kampamba Mulenga
	Minister of Transport and Communication	Mutotwe L Kafwaya
	Minister of Works and Supply	Sylvia Bambala Chalikosa
	Minister of Office of the Vice President	Olipa Mwansa Phiri
	Minister of Tourism and Arts	Ronald Kaoma Chitotela
	Minister of Housing and Infrastructure Development	Vincent Mwale
	Minister of Local Government	Charles Romel Banda
	Minister of Gender	Elizabeth Phiri
	Minister of General Education	Dennis Musuku Wanchinga
	Minister of Water Development, Sanitation and Environmental Protection	Raphael Nakacinda
	Minister of Health	Jonas Kamima Chanda
Ex officio member
	Attorney General	Likando Kalaluka
