= Kanyama (constituency) =

Constituency of the National Assembly of Zambia

Kanyama is a constituency of the National Assembly of Zambia. It covers the Lusaka suburbs of Kanyama, Chinika and Garden House in Lusaka District of Lusaka Province.

== List of MPs ==
Election year	MP	Party
1973	Fleefort Chirwa	United National Independence Party
1978	Fleefort Chirwa	United National Independence Party
1983	Alfayo Hambayi	United National Independence Party
1988	Donald Chilufya	United National Independence Party
1991	Marriam Nyanga	Movement for Multi-Party Democracy
1996	Nakatindi Wina	Movement for Multi-Party Democracy
2001	Henry Mtonga	United Party for National Development
2006	Henry Mtonga	Patriotic Front
2008 (by-election)	Gerry Chanda	Patriotic Front
2011	Gerry Chanda	Patriotic Front
2016	Elizabeth Phiri	Independent
2021	Monty Chinkuli	United Party for National Development
2026	Cleopatra Hamaambo	United Party for National Development
