= Kasenengwa =

Constituency of the National Assembly of Zambia

Kasenengwa is a constituency of the National Assembly of Zambia. It covers Kasenengwa District in Eastern Province.

== List of MPs ==
Election year	MP	Party
1983	Dane Zulu	United National Independence Party
1988	John Ngoma	United National Independence Party
1991	Patrick Mvunga	United National Independence Party
1996	Adam Machher	Movement for Multi-Party Democracy
2001	Timothy Nyirenda	United National Independence Party
2006	Vera Tembo	Movement for Multi-Party Democracy
2011	Victoria Kalima	Movement for Multi-Party Democracy
2014 (by-election)	Victoria Kalima	Movement for Multi-Party Democracy
2016	Victoria Kalima	Patriotic Front
2018 (by-election)	Sensio Banda	Patriotic Front
2021	Philimon Twasa	Patriotic Front
2026	Philimon Twasa	National Reconciliation Party for Unity and Prosperity
