= Elizabeth Phiri =

Zambian politician

Minister of Gender
- In office January 2019 – August 2021
- President: Edgar Lungu
- Preceded by: Victoria Kalima

Member of Parliament for Kanyama
- In office August 2016 – August 2021
- Preceded by: Gerry Chanda
- Succeeded by: Monty Chinkuli

Personal details
- Born: 26 October 1960 (age 65)
- Profession: Social Worker

Elizabeth Phiri is a Zambian politician. She was the Member of Parliament for Kanyama Constituency from 2016 to 2021 and she also served as the Minister of Gender from January 2019 in the Zambian government.

== See also ==
- Politics of Zambia
- Second Lungu Cabinet
