= Remmy Kajoba =

Zambian law enforcement official

Remmy Kajoba is a Zambian police officer. On 29 August 2021, newly elected President Hakainde Hichilema appointed him Inspector General of Police. Kajoba has also held the office of Muchinga Province Police Commissioner.

== See also ==
- Kakoma Kanganja
