= Kakoma Kanganja =

Zambian police officer

Kakoma Kanganja was a Zambian police officer who headed the Zambia Police Service as Inspector General of Police (2016-2021). He was appointed to the position in 2016 by President Edgar Lungu.

In 2018, he was called to testify in a criminal case of Zambian politician Tayali opened by opposition leader Hakainde Hichilema.
