= Kikoi =

Clothing emanating from Africa

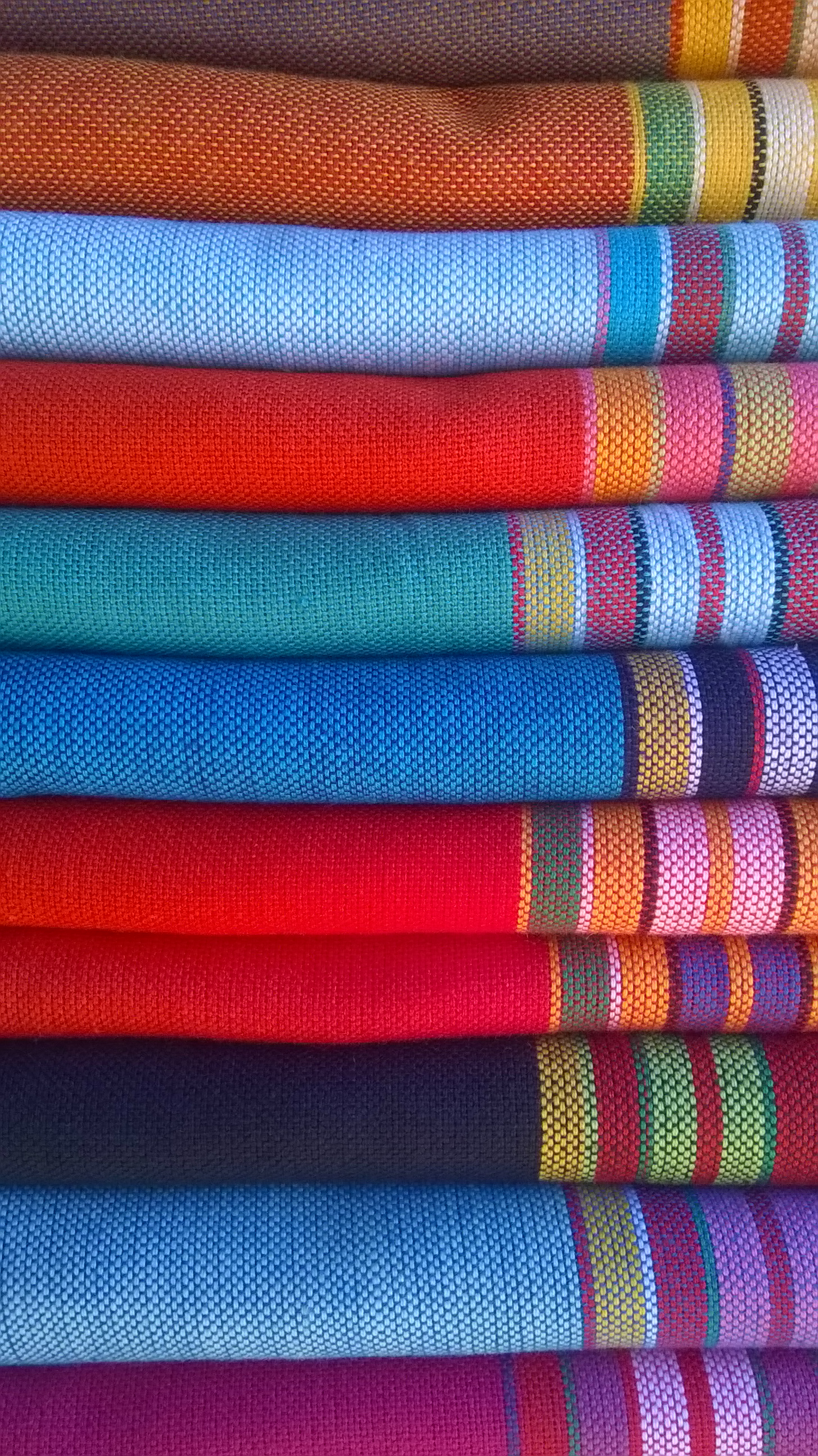
Kikoy fabric in Nairobi

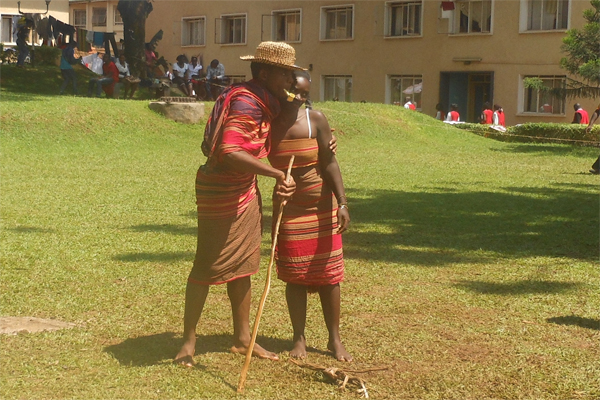
Traditional kikoi being worn.

A kikoi is a traditional rectangle of woven cloth originating from Africa. Considered a part of Swahili culture, the kikoi is mostly worn by the coastal people, but now also includes the Maasai people of Kenya and men from Tanzania and Zanzibar. It is most commonly viewed as a type of sarong.

== Description ==
The kikoi is made of cotton and patterns are woven rather than dyed into the fabric. As with all sarongs, it is a single piece of cloth which is wrapped around the waist, and rolled over outwards a couple of times. Outside of their intended use as a sarong, they can be used as a sling to hold a baby, towel, or a head wrap.

== History ==
The kikoi is said to have come to Kenya from Somalia. The city of Barawa was famous for its weaving of kikoi. A type of kikoi was called banadir, a name derived from its origin in the textile centers of Somalia's Banadir coast, a region historically renowned for its textile trade. The garment remains a popular souvenir for tourists visiting Kenya.

== See also ==
- Kanga
- Kitenge
