= Zambia Police Service =

National police force

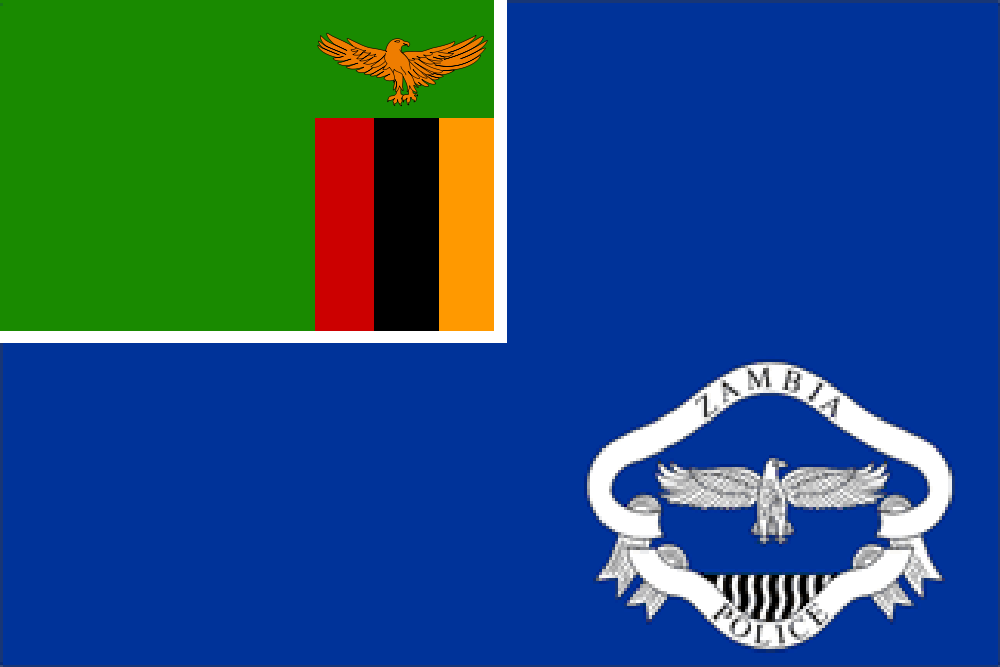
- Common name: Zambia Police
- Abbreviation: ZP

Agency overview
- Formed: 1964
- Preceding agency: Northern Rhodesia Police
- Employees: 21,944

Jurisdictional structure
- Operations jurisdiction: Districts of Zambia, ZM
- Map of Zambia showing Zambia Police Jurisdiction
- Area: 752,618 square kilometres (290,587 sq mi)
- Population: 21,913,874
- Legal jurisdiction: Zambia
- Governing body: Ministry of Home Affairs
- Constituting instrument: Constitution of the Republic of Zambia, 1991- Section 103, as amended in 1996
- General nature: Civilian police

Operational structure
- Overseen by Civilian body: The Public Police Complaints Authority
- Headquarters: Zambia Police Headquarters; Government Road; LUSAKA
- Sworn members: 21,944
- Agency executive: Inspector General of Police, Mr Graphel Musamba
- Parent agency: Ministry of Home Affairs
- Directorates: List: • Administration; • Operations; • Technical Services; • Criminal Investigations; • Medical Services
- Territorial Commands: List: Police Divisions: • Central • Copperbelt • Eastern • Luapula • Lusaka • Northern • Muchinga • North-Western • Southern • Western
- Services provided by: List: Support Units: • Paramilitary • Mobile • Protective • Airport • Tazara • Lilaya Police College
- Uniformed as: Zambia Police Service

Website
- www.zambiapolice.gov.zm

The Zambia Police Service is the organisation concerned with maintaining the rule of law in Zambia. It is under the portfolio of the Minister of Home Affairs.

== History ==
On 24 October 1964 Northern Rhodesia gained independence and became the Republic of Zambia. Northern Rhodesia Police (NRP) became the Zambia Police. Lawson Hicks, the last Commissioner of the NRP became the first Commissioner of the Zambia Police. He was succeeded by Michael Mataka who had joined the NRP as a constable in 1941.

== Police ranks and insignia ==
| Rank | Insignia |
|---|---|
| Constable | |
Sergeant
Inspector
Chief Inspector
Assistant Superintendent
Superintendent
Senior Superintendent
Assistant Commissioner
Senior Assistant Commissioner
Deputy Commissioner
Commissioner
Deputy Inspector General
Inspector General

Source International encyclopedia of uniform Insignia

== Commissioners and Inspectors- General ==
Commissioners of Police

- Mr. Lawson Hicks - 1964-1965
- Mr. Michael Mataka – 1965—1970
- Mr. Fabiano Chela – 1970—1973

Inspectors-General

- Mr. Fabiano Chela – (1973—1978)
- Mr. Chrispin Katukula – (1978—1979)
- Mr. Fabiano Chela – (1979—1983)
- Mr. Hebert Mapili – (1983 —1985)
- Mr. Henry Mtonga – (1985—1989)
- Mr. Joshua Konayuma - (1989—1990)
- Mr. Zunga Siakalima – (1990—1991)
- Mr. Darius Kalebo – (1991—1994)
- Mr. Francis Ndlovu – (1994—2000)
- Mr. Silas Ngangula – (2000—2002)
- Mr. Francis Musonda – (2002—2003)
- Mr. Zunga Siakalima – (2003—2006)
- Mr. Ephraim Mateyo – (2006—2008)
- Mr. Francis Kabonde – (2008—2011)
- Dr. Martin Malama – (2011—2012)
- Ms. Stella Libongani – (2012—2016)
- Mr. Kakoma Kanganja – (2016—2021)
- Mr. Remmy Kajoba - (2021-2023)
- Mr. Graphel Musamba - (2023 -date)

== Societal impact ==
The Zambia Police Service is almost solely a reactive force and demonstrates rather poor proactive law enforcement techniques and initiative to deter or investigate crime. Police often lack equipment, resources, training, and personnel to respond to calls for assistance or other emergencies. Police response times can be long, if they respond at all. Police often cite a lack of adequate transportation as an excuse for slow/no response.

Most crimes go unreported and/or uninvestigated. The police have a poor record of solving serious crimes. According to Zambia Police crime statistics for the third quarter of 2019, the nationwide arrest rate from crimes averages 50%.

Inadequate legislation and investigation results in the lack of prosecution or large numbers of acquittals. Corruption occurs at all levels, resulting in an ineffective legal and justice system. Vigilantism is present as a result.

Low pay and morale create an environment in which bribes of even a few dollars can make allegations or charges disappear.

The major law enforcement agencies are the Zambia Police Service (a nationwide police force responsible for traditional policing and investigations), Immigration, Customs, the Drug Enforcement Commission, the Anti-Corruption Commission, and the Department of National Parks and Wildlife. There is no dedicated “Border Patrol.” Border security alternates between whichever law enforcement agency may have a presence at a border post at any given time.

The legislative and constitutional provisions that provide for the Zambia Police Service meet the most basic requirements of the rule of law, which is defined by Carothers as a system in which the laws are public knowledge, are clear, apply to everyone equally, and uphold political and civil liberties.
