= Akosombo Textile Limited =

Textile company in Ghana

- Akosombo Textile Limited
- Formation: 1987; 39 years ago
- Location: Akosombo, Eastern Region, Ghana

Akosombo Textile Limited (ATL) is a textile company in Ghana that produces real wax and African Fancy prints with 100% cotton. It is located on the grounds next to the Akosombo Dam in the Eastern Region. It has weaving, spinning and finishing facilities. It has four fabric labels: ATL, ABC, Treasure and Inspiration. The company's current manager is Ing. Kenneth Asare

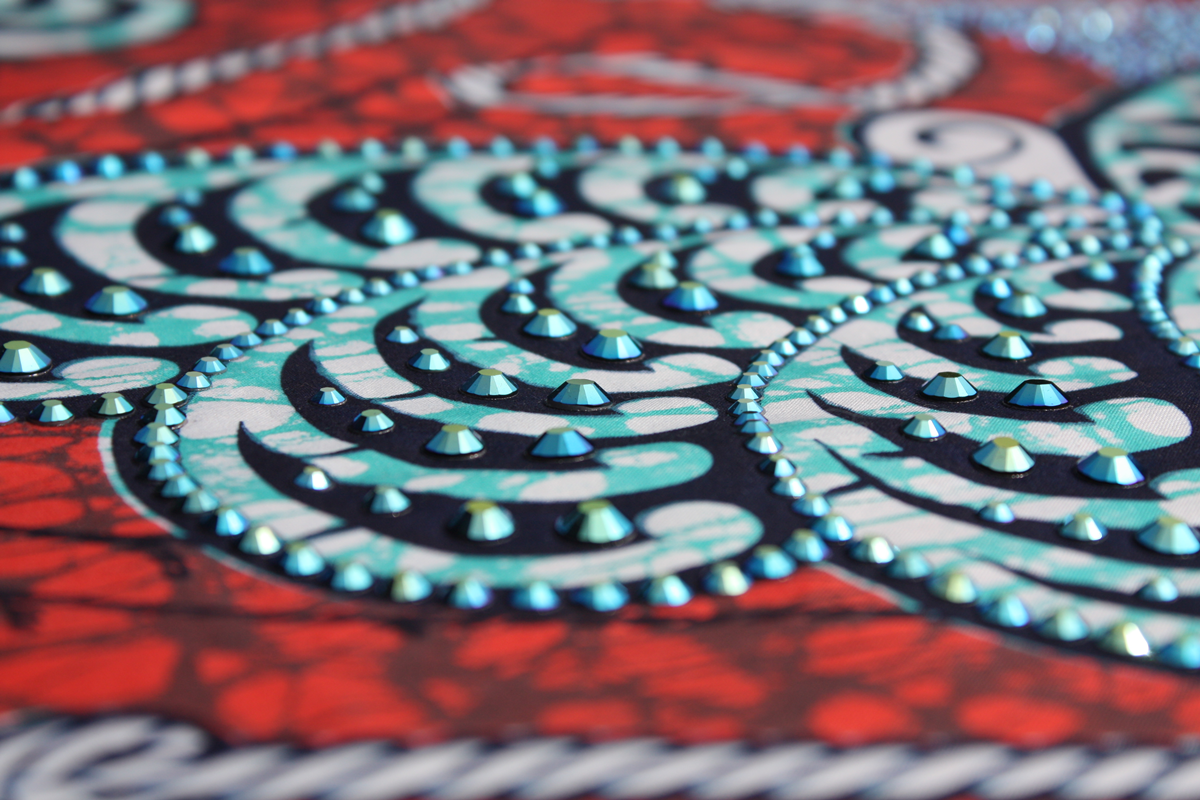
African print from Akosombo Textile Limited

== History ==
During the second half of the 19th Century, Javanese batik print was introduced to West Africa. Wax print was based on Javanese batik print. African soldiers took cloth that was brightly colored with them after serving in Indonesia. This introduced local production which was slow and laborious because of the traditional process of production.

Akosombo Textiles Limited now Akosombo Industrial Company Limited was established in 1967. A new production line ABC (A. Brunschweiler & Company) Wax opened a new facility at ATL to produce a standard wax range for the Ghanaian local market. ABC over the past 100 years has been synonymous with textile manufacturing in Africa and Europe for English Wax.

In December 2005 ABC's new production facility in Ghana was officially inaugurated at Akosombo Textiles Limited. ABC standard has been printed in Ghana since 2006 by ATL as a collaboration between ABC, UK and ATL. The decision to move the production of Standard to Ghana was to meet the changing demand of local African consumers.

The production of high quality Standard wax in Ghana during 2006/7 led to the transfer of ABC products such as Superwax, Handblock and Premium, and resulted in the final closure of the Manchester production facility in December 2007.

== Design creation ==
Textiles are designed on cultural beliefs, values and heritage of its people. Adinkra symbols are incorporated and there are motifs for different occasions. Designs are also created for the unity of organizations and institutions.
