= Ministry of Home Affairs (Zambia) =

Government ministry of Zambia

The Ministry of Home Affairs is a ministry in Zambia. It is headed by the Minister of Home Affairs.

== List of ministers ==
Minister	Party	Term start	Term end
Simon Kapwepwe	United National Independence Party	1964	1964
Mainza Chona	United National Independence Party	1964	1967
Lewis Changufu	United National Independence Party	1967	1967
Alexander Grey Zulu	United National Independence Party	1967	1970
Malimba Masheke	United National Independence Party	1988	1989
Stephen Kampyongo	Patriotic Front	2016	2021
Jack Mwiimbu	United Party for National Development	2021	2026

=== Deputy ministers ===
Deputy Minister	Party	Term start	Term end
Gerry Chanda	Patriotic Front	2015	2016
