= Seshoeshoe =

Southern African printed dyed cotton fabric

Seshweshwe (/ˈsəˈʃwɛʃwɛɪ/) (also known as Seshoeshoe) is a printed dyed cotton fabric widely used for traditional Southern African Basotho clothing. Originally dyed indigo, the fabric is manufactured in a variety of colours and printing designs characterised by intricate geometric patterns. Due to its popularity, shweshwe has been described as the denim, or tartan, of South Africa.

== Name ==
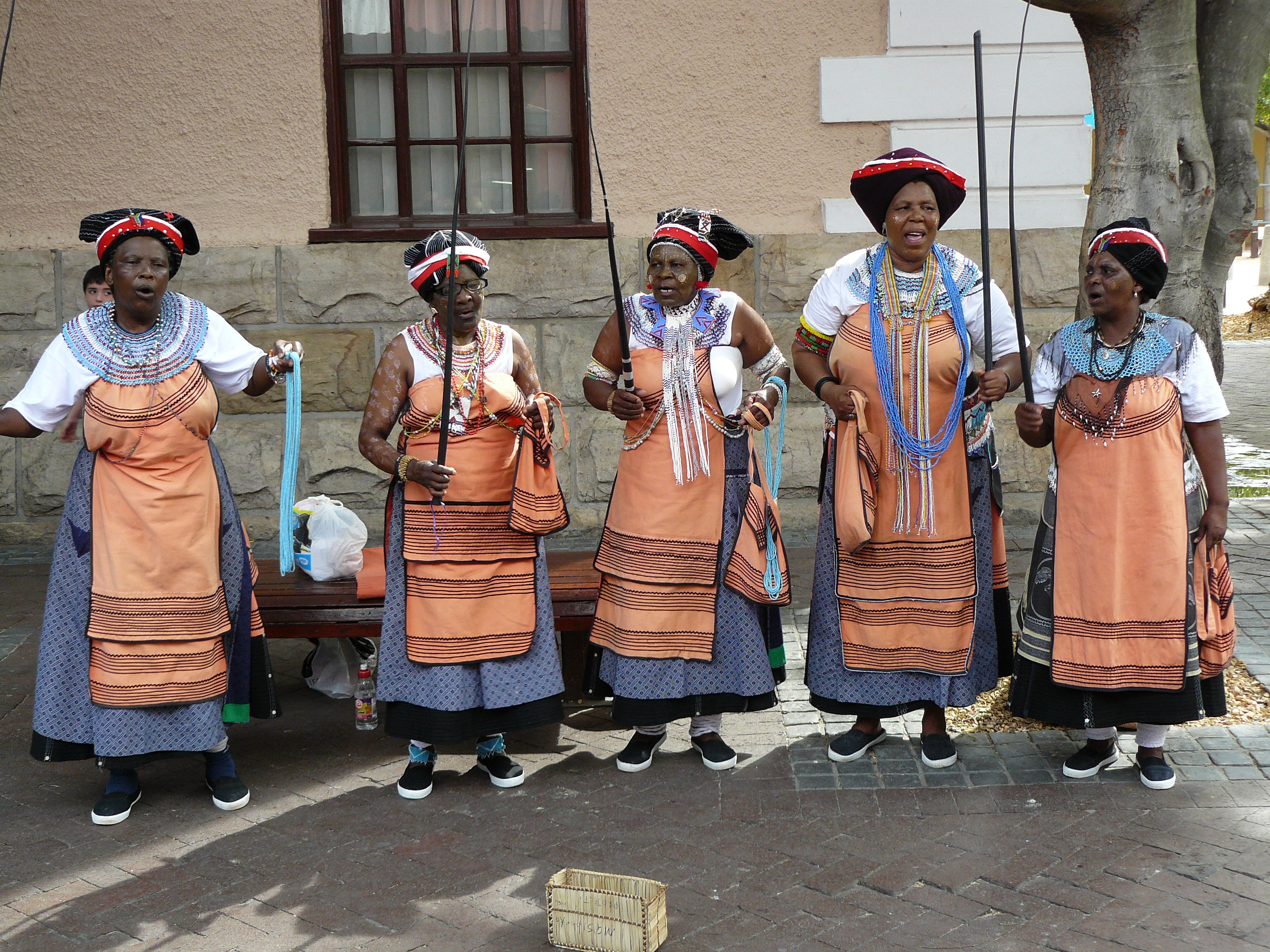
Xhosa women in traditional costume wearing indigo shweshwe aprons

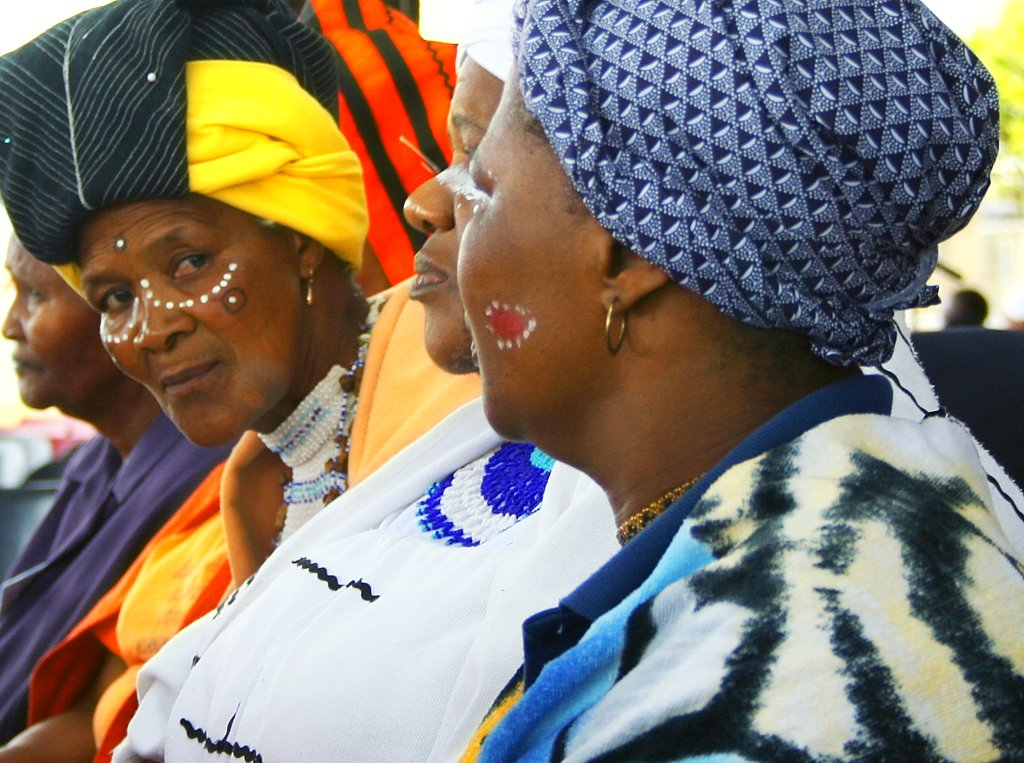
Xhosa woman wearing a head scarf made from indigo seshoeshoe (on the right)

The local name seshoeshoe is derived from the fabric's association with Lesotho's King Moshoeshoe I,. Moshoeshoe I was gifted with the fabric by French missionaries in the 1840s and subsequently popularised it.

It is also known as sejeremane or seshoeshoe in Sotho as well as terantala (derived from Afrikaans tarentaal), and ujamani in Xhosa, after 19th century German and Swiss settlers who imported the blaudruck ("blue print") fabric for their clothing and helped entrench it in South African and Basotho culture.

== Uses ==
Shweshwe is traditionally used to make dresses, skirts, aprons and wrap around clothing. Shweshwe clothing is traditionally worn by newly married Xhosa women, known as makoti, and married Sotho women. Xhosa women have also incorporated the fabric into their traditional ochre-coloured blanket clothing.

Aside from traditional wear, shweshwe is used in contemporary South African fashion design for women and men from all ethnic groups, as well as for making accessories and upholstery. It is also used in the United States as a quilting fabric.

== Production ==
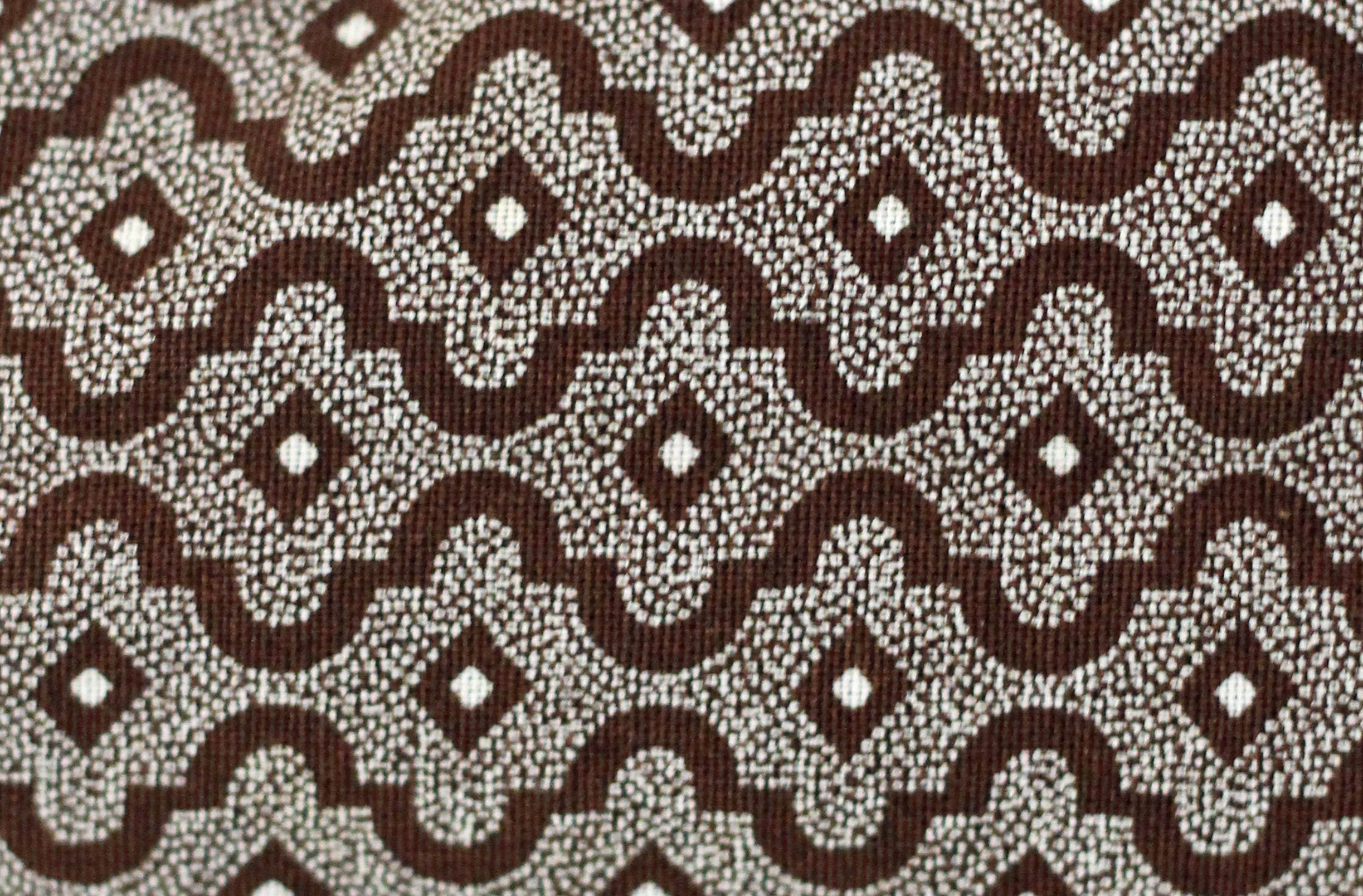
Chocolate brown shweshwe

Shweshwe is manufactured with an acid discharge and roller printing technique on pure cotton calico. It is printed in widths of 90 cm, in all-over patterns and A-shaped skirt panels printed side by side. The fabric is manufactured in various colours including the original indigo, chocolate brown and red, in a large variety of designs including florals, stripes, and diamond, square and circular geometric patterns. The intricate designs are made using picotage, a pinning fabric printing technique rarely used by contemporary fabric manufacturers due to its complexity and expense, although the design effects have been replicated using modern fabric printing techniques.

Previously imported to Southern Africa from Europe, the trademarked fabric has been manufactured by Da Gama Textiles in the Zwelitsha township outside King William's Town in the Eastern Cape since 1982. In 1992, Da Gama Textiles bought the sole rights to Three Cats, the most popular brand of the fabric made by Spruce Manufacturing Co. Ltd in Manchester, and the original engraved copper rollers were shipped to South Africa. Da Gama Textiles has made shweshwe from cotton imported from Zimbabwe and grown locally in the Eastern Cape.

The local textile industry, including shweshwe production by Da Gama Textiles, has been threatened by competition from cheaper inferior quality imitations made locally and imported from China and Pakistan. The genuine product can be recognised by feel, smell, taste, sound, a solid colour from dyeing and trademark logos on the reverse side of the fabric, a smaller than average 90 cm fabric width and stiffness of the new fabric from traditional starching which washes out. As at November 2013, shweshwe production by Da Gama Textiles had reduced to five million metres per annum.

== In popular culture ==
- Jill Scott, who portrayed the main character Mma Precious Ramotswe in The No. 1 Ladies' Detective Agency TV series, wore outfits made from shweshwe for the production.

== See also ==
- African wax prints
