= Vlisco =

Dutch company for African-style textile fabrics

The Vlisco Group

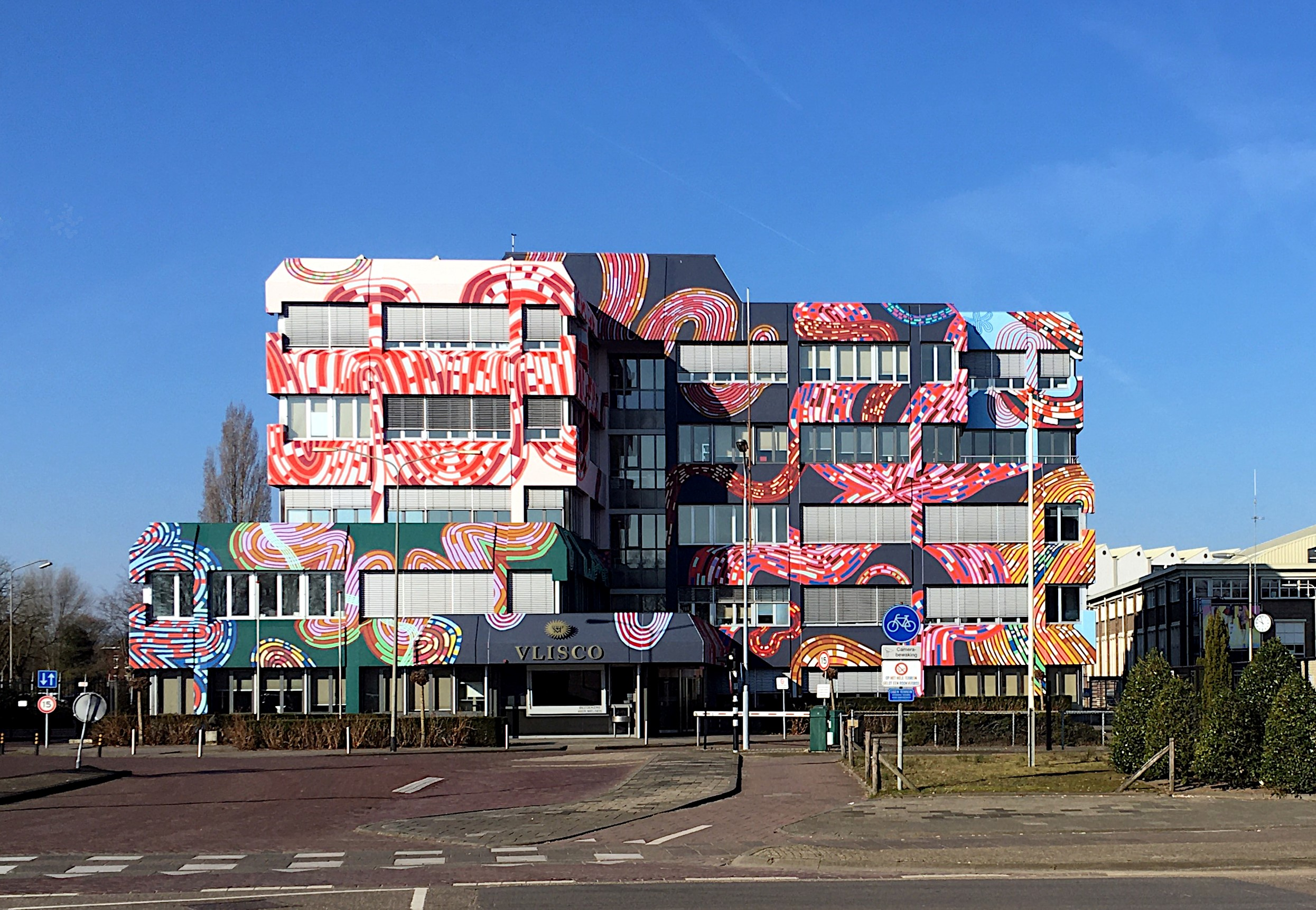
- Vlisco, Helmond
- Founded: 1846; 180 years ago
- Founder: Pieter Fentener van Vlissingen
- Headquarters: Helmond
- Brands: Vlisco, Woodin, Uniwax, GTP
- Number of employees: 2,700
- Website: vlisco.com

The Vlisco Group designs, produces and distributes fashion fabrics, especially of the African wax print style, for the West and Central African market and African consumers in global metropolitan cities. Founded in Helmond, the Netherlands, in 1846, the Vlisco Group and their fabrics have grown into an essential part of African culture, receiving widespread attention from the art, design and fashion worlds. Vlisco Group's brand portfolio consists of four brands: Vlisco, Woodin, Uniwax and GTP. The company's head office, as well as the design and production facilities for the Vlisco brand, are located in Helmond. For the other brands these facilities are based in Ghana and Ivory Coast. The Vlisco Group has eight sales offices in numerous African countries and around 2,700 employees (900 in The Netherlands and 1,800 in Africa).

== History ==
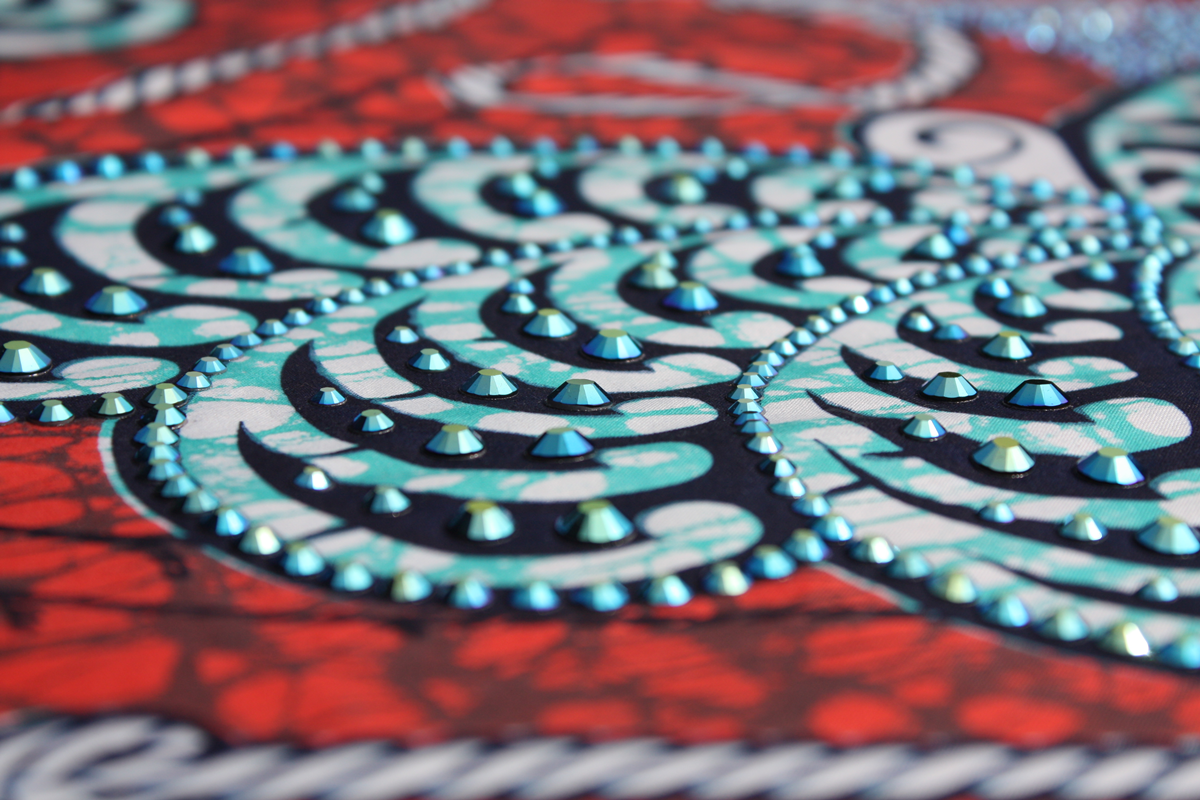
Vlisco textile with crystals

Vlisco Group was founded in 1846, when Pieter Fentener van Vlissingen bought an existing textile printing factory and named it P. Fentener van Vlissingen & co., aiming to produce and sell hand printed fabrics in- and outside of the Netherlands. Originally, production included handkerchiefs, bedspreads, chintz and furniture fabrics. In the second half of the 19th century, Fentener van Vlissingen started exporting imitation batiks to what was then called the Dutch East Indies after he was told by his uncle that there was a pressing need for affordable fabrics. Thanks to the invention of roller printing, it was possible to recreate the batik look a lot less labour-intensively, which meant that Fentener van Vlissingen could produce it quicker and sell it cheaper than local craftsmen could. This was also its only selling point, as the Indonesians did not care for the too even look of the imitation batiks.

Once the Dutch East Indies banned imitation batiks, Fentener van Vlissingen had to search for a new market to sell his goods. Since the start, the company has produced and sold hand-printed textiles both domestically and abroad. Around 1852, the VOC Dutch East Indies trade routes became involved in the export of the hand-printed Vlisco fabrics. The fabrics were used for bartering during stopovers in Western Africa. Since the Dutch had been dealing in European luxury goods with West-Africans since the Late Middle Ages, it seemed a logical step to move selling activities to that region. Another reason is that the fabrics sold in Indonesia had become popular among the Belanda Hitam, Ghanaian soldiers who served in the Royal Netherlands East Indies Army and returned home between 1837 and 1872.

By the time the 20th century rolled around, West- and Central Africa were growing into a booming textile market and by the 1930s the 'wax hollandais' cloth's designs were being adapted to local tastes.

In 1927 the company changed its name to Vlisco, a contraction of Vlissingen & co., but the fabrics were by then widely known as 'Dutch Wax' or 'Wax Hollandais', and those names stuck. During World War II, production was stopped and the finished fabrics could not be shipped to the African markets. The African fabric markets were starved of Dutch Wax for the entirety of the war and when in 1945 Vlisco managed to send a shipment of a fabric called 'Six Bougies' , it was an immediate success. So much so, that from 1963 onwards, all Vlisco fabrics have the text 'Guaranteed Dutch Wax Vlisco' stamped on the side, because the fabrics were and still are widely counterfeited.

Unlike the Vlisco brand, the entire process – from design to production and distribution – for the Woodin, Uniwax and GTP brands takes place in Africa. When, in the mid-1960s, the import duties on printed textiles were doubled in several Western African countries, a percentage of imports were replaced by local production. This led to the establishment of the GTP (Ghana Textiles Printing Company) brand in 1966, with production taking place at a factory in Ghana, and the establishment of Uniwax in 1970, with production facilities in the Ivory Coast (Koert van, Robin, Dutch Wax Design Technology: van Helmond naar West-Afrika, 2008). The pan-African brand Woodin has been produced in both the GTP and Uniwax factories since 1985. Furthermore, Vlisco made a historical decision in 1993 by abandoning hand printing, to be able to produce fabric on a larger scale.

Over time, the Vlisco brand has developed a production process whereby the fabric goes through 27 treatments, both by machine and by hand, and takes two weeks to produce. This process is a closely guarded secret. Since 2006, the company has been aiming at high end markets and is currently preparing to release a ready to wear fashion line.

The Vlisco Group carries four brands: Vlisco, Woodin, Uniwax and GTP. Each of these brands has its own style, brand identity and consumer target group. Four times a year, the Group launches a new collection of fashion fabrics under their luxury flagship brand Vlisco, designed and produced in Helmond. Since it was established in 1846, Vlisco designs and fabrics, have grown to become an essential part of African style culture, with deep-rooted influences across all layers of society. Uniwax and GTP are designed and produced in Ivory Coast and Ghana and focus on the growing middle class in West and Central Africa. Woodin is the smallest, but fastest-growing brand in Vlisco Group's brand portfolio. At this moment, 60% of the population in West- and Central Africa is under 25 years old. This segment is growing, extremely connected via social media and mobile devices and show fast changes in consumer behavior regarding to lifestyle, fashion and media usage. The lifestyle brand Woodin focusses on this consumer group.

== Postcolonial criticism ==
Critics, such as Tunde Akinwumi, feel that Vlisco's origins are misleading, especially since the company profiles itself as the 'originator of African Wax'. Akinwumi's 2008 article, 'The "African Print" Hoax', argues that producers of African prints mislead customers by pretending to sell authentic African designs, while they are in fact based on Chinese, Indian, Japanese, Arabic and European imagery. Therefore, he advocates a new African aesthetic, based on traditional African fabrics, such as kente, adire, aso oke and bogolanfini, and expresses hope that textile producers and governments will support this cause and help change Africa's image to a more authentic one.

In his book Vlisco, Jos Arts, however, represents the counter critics, who are of the opinion that critics like Akinwumi have misunderstood a main principle of fashion, namely that it is subject to constant change and therefore even though Vlisco's fabrics were initially not authentically African, the century-long process of appropriation and mutual influence ensures that it has become so.

In the realms of art, Vlisco fabrics are extensively used by British-Nigerian artist Yinka Shonibare, who dresses headless mannequins in baroque gowns and suits, to challenge Western colonial history.

== Symbolism ==
Vlisco fabrics are given an interesting form of symbolism, which allows African women to speak out, yet stay silent. Once a fabric has been designed and shipped, it is given a name which often ties into local sayings by the saleswomen. An example of this is a fabric with a print of open bird-cages and two birds flying out, that goes by the title "Si tu sors, je sors" (You leave, I leave), which means to say "If you think this marriage is something you can take and leave as you please, I will do the same." Other fabrics are known as 'Come to my bedroom wearing your slippers' or 'Kofi Annan's brain". What is important to consider in all this is that this kind of symbolism is only possible both because the messages are open to multiple interpretations and the fabrics are worn as dresses, and no one can divorce or attack a woman for wearing a pretty dress.
