= Kitenge =

African piece of fabric wrapped around the chest

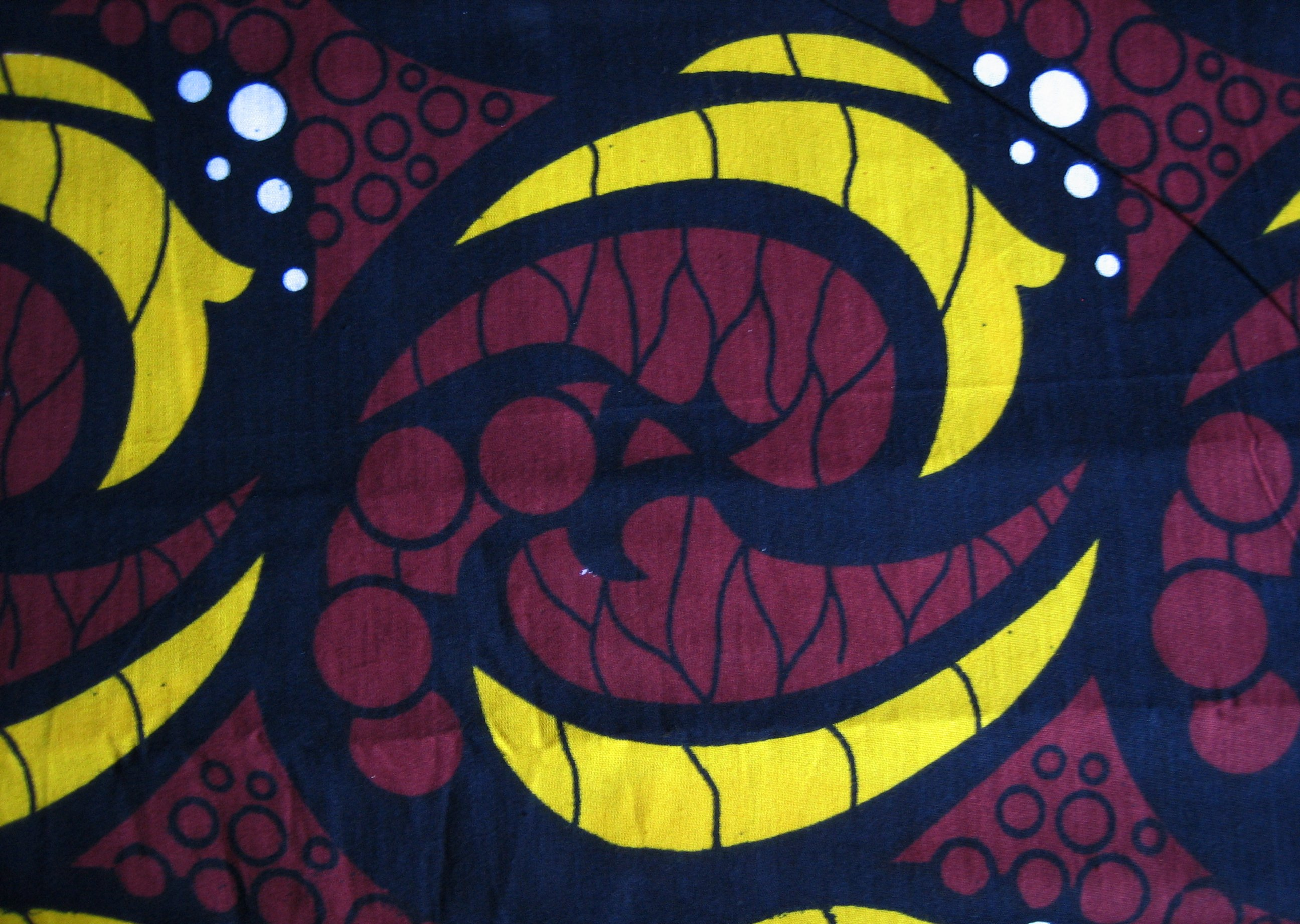
A typical kitenge pattern.

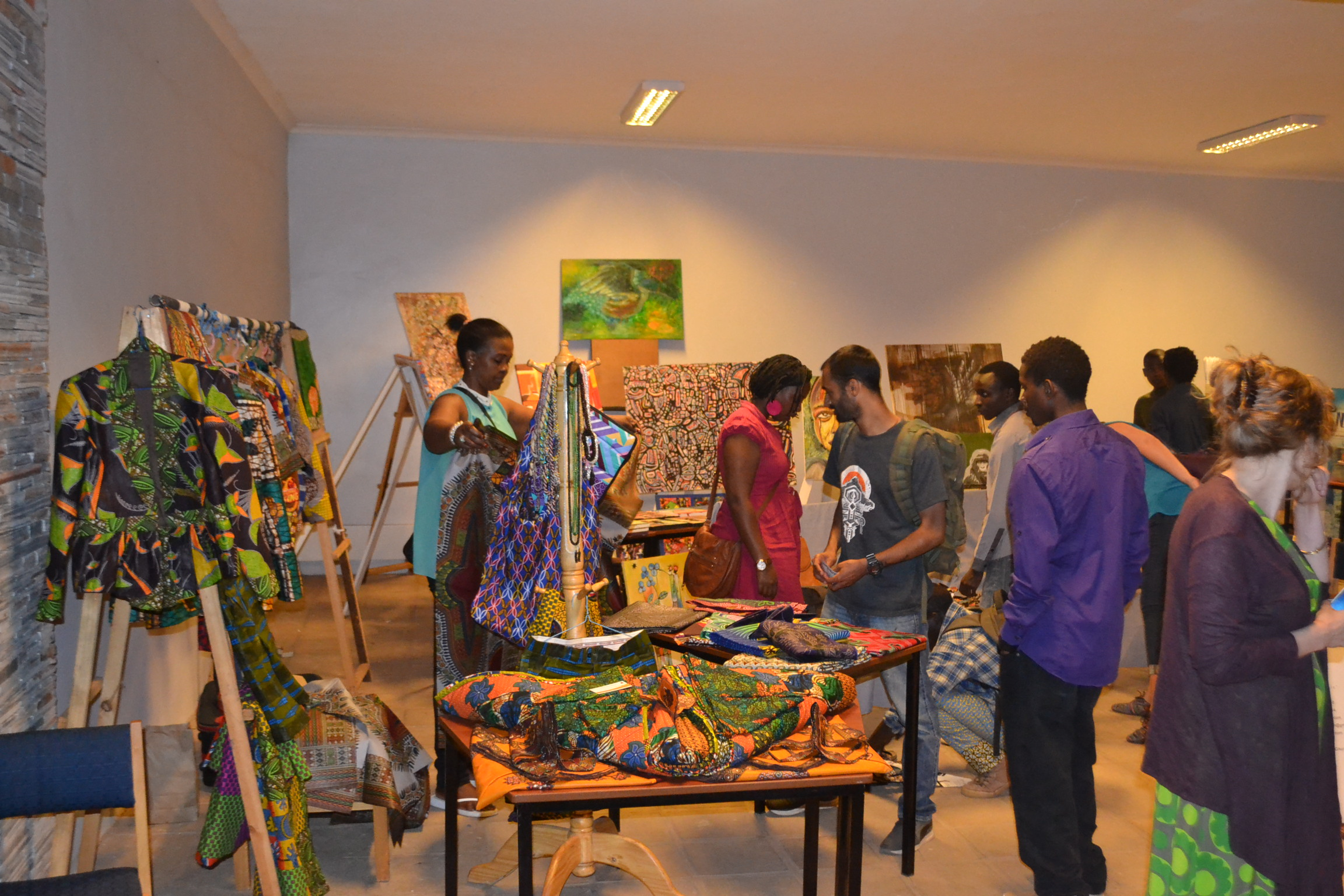
Customers and visitors at a display of African kitenge clothes

A kitenge or chitenge (pl. vitenge Swahili; zitenge in Tonga) is an East African, West African and Central African piece of fabric similar to a sarong, often worn by women and wrapped around the chest or waist, over the head as a headscarf, or as a baby sling. Kitenges are made of colorful fabric that contains a variety of patterns and designs. In coastal areas of Kenya and in Tanzania, kitenges often have Swahili sayings written on them. There seems to be confusion with the Kangas, which carry text, unlike kitenges, which typically do not carry text.

Kitenges are similar to kangas and kikoi, but are of a thicker cloth and have an edging on only a long side. Kenya, Uganda, Tanzania, Sudan, Nigeria, Cameroon, Ghana, Senegal, Liberia, Rwanda, Burundi, and Democratic Republic of the Congo are some of the African countries where the kitenge is worn. In Malawi, the garment is known as a chitenje, while in Namibia and some parts of Zambia, it is called a chitenge. They are sometimes worn by men around the waist in hot weather. In Malawi, men traditionally did not wear kitenges, but this changed recently when the president encouraged civil servants to support Malawian products by wearing a kitenge on Fridays.

A kitenge serves as an inexpensive, informal piece of clothing that is often decorated with a wide variety of colors, patterns and even political slogans.

The printing on the cloth is done by an industrialised version of the traditional batik technique, which originated in Indonesia. These are known as wax prints, and the design is just as bright and detailed on the obverse side of the fabric. Today, wax prints are commercially produced and are mostly roller printed, with less color bleeding through to the obverse side. Many of the designs have a meaning. A large variety of religious and political designs are found as well as traditional tribal patterns. The cloth is used as material for dresses, blouses and pants as well.

== Uses ==
Kitenges can be used on various occasions and in many ways, both symbolically and practically. Kitenges are used in different settings to convey messages. The following list demonstrates uses of the cloths.

- In Malawi, kitenges are customary for women at funerals.
- They are used as a sling to hold a baby across the back of a mother. They can hold the baby at the front as well, particularly when breastfeeding.
- Kitenges are given as gifts to young women.
- They are sometimes tied together and used as decorative pieces at dinner tables.
- When women go to the beach, often the kitenge is wrapped around the bathing suit for modesty or to shield from the cold air.
- Kitenges can be framed or otherwise hung up on the wall as a decorative batik artwork.

Kitenges have also become very popular as fashion statements in urban pop culture with youth in Africa. Kitenges are incorporated in clothing items such as hoodies, trousers, and accessories such as bags.

== See also ==
- African wax prints
- Shweshwe
