= 2021 in Zambia =

- Decades: 2000s; 2010s; 2020s
- See also: Other events of 2021; Timeline of Zambian history

Events in the year 2021 in Zambia.

== Incumbents ==
- President: Edgar Lungu (until 24 August), Hakainde Hichilema (starting 24 August)

== Events ==
Ongoing — COVID-19 pandemic in Zambia

- 12 August - Zambian President Edgar Lungu deploys army members throughout the country as Zambia holds election.
- 14 August - Incumbent President Lungu states that the 2021 general election was not free and fair.
- 16 August - Hakainde Hichilema is declared the winner of the 2021 Zambian general election
- *24 August - Hakainde Hichilema is sworn in as the 7th Republican President of Zambia

== Deaths ==
=== January ===
- 13 January – Moses Hamungole, Roman Catholic prelate, Bishop of Monze (b. 1967).
- 21 January – Anthony Mwamba, 61, boxing promoter; COVID-19.

=== June ===
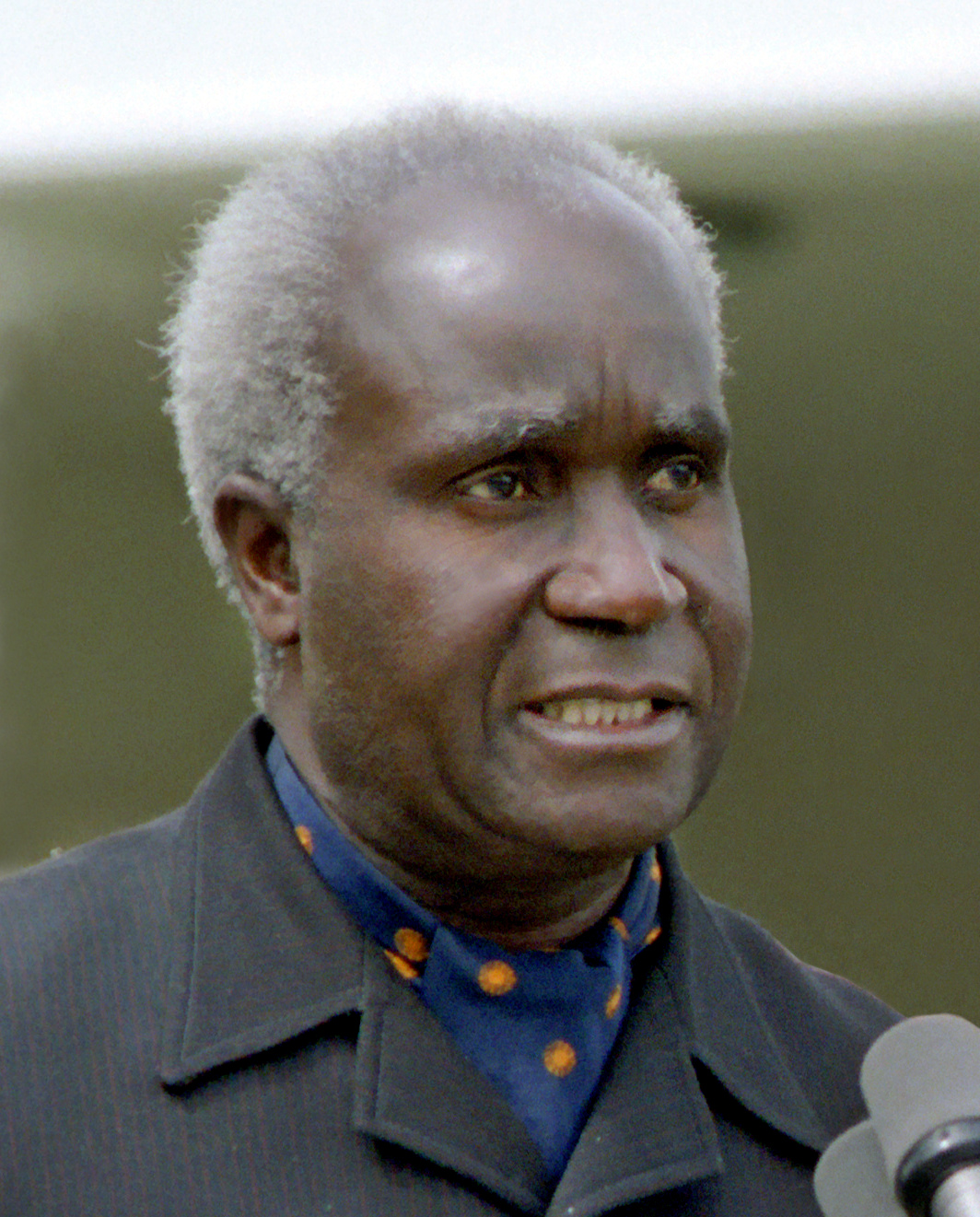
Kenneth Kaunda

- 17 June – Kenneth Kaunda, 97, Zambian politician; pneumonia (b. 1924).
- 20 June – Irene Mambilima, 69, chief justice.

=== November ===
- 18 November – Levy Mkandawire, 60, Zambian politician.

== See also ==
- International Conference on the Great Lakes Region
- COVID-19 pandemic in Africa
