= 2025 in Zambia =

- Decades: 2000s; 2010s; 2020s
- See also: Other events of 2025; Timeline of Zambian history

Events in the year 2025 in Zambia.

== Incumbents ==
Photo	Post	Name
U.S. Vice President Kamala Harris meets with Hakainde Hichilema	President of Zambia	Hakainde Hichilema
	Vice President of Zambia	W.K. Mutale Nalumango

== Events ==
=== February ===
- 18 February – 2025 Sino-Metals Leach Zambia dam disaster: A tailings dam belonging to a Chinese-operated copper mine collapses in northern Zambia, causing 50 million liters of waste containing concentrated acid, dissolved solids and heavy metals to enter a tributary of the Kafue River and prompting a shutdown of the water supply in Kitwe.

=== April ===
- 8 April – President Hichilema signs a law requiring the interception and surveillance of all electronic communications in the country.

=== May ===
- 8 May – The United States halts the provision of $50 million in medical aid to Zambia, citing "systematic theft" of donations.

=== June ===
- 25 June – A court in South Africa orders a suspension of the burial of former president Edgar Lungu amid a dispute between Lungu's family and the Zambian government over the funeral arrangements.

=== July ===
- 3 July – Two foreign tourists are killed in an elephant attack in South Luangwa National Park.
- 5 July – A minivan collides with a locomotive in Mpika, killing nine people.
- 21 July – The government announces an agreement to build a $1.1 billion crude oil refinery and energy complex in Ndola.

=== August ===
- 6 August – The US Embassy orders all American government personnel to leave areas affected by the 2025 Sino-Metals Leach Zambia dam disaster in February, citing continuing contamination and the possible presence of airborne hazards.
- 8 August – A court in South Africa orders the family of deceased former president Edgar Lungu to repatriate his remains to Zambia and allow the government to hold a state funeral for him. A final appeal by Lungu's family is rejected on 16 September.

=== September ===
- 15 September – Two people, including a Mozambican national, are sentenced to two years' imprisonment for plotting to assassinate President Hichilema through witchcraft rituals.
- 16 September – Around 176 farmers file a lawsuit against multiple Chinese-linked mining firms for $80 billion over agricultural damages caused by the 2025 Sino-Metals Leach Zambia dam disaster in February.

=== November ===
- 8 November – President Hichilema is heckled by stone-throwers while giving a speech in Chingola, resulting in 27 arrests.

=== December ===
- 1 December – Zambia begins administering the HIV prevention injection drug lenacapavir.
- 16 December – US President Donald Trump issues a proclamation imposing partial travel restrictions on Zambian nationals travelling to the United States.
- 18 December – Multiple constitutional amendments are signed by President Hichilema, including the expansion of the National Assembly from 167 to 280 members.

== Holidays ==
- 1 January – New Year's Day
- 21 February – National Youth Day
- 8 March – International Women's Day
- 12 March – Youth Day
- 18 April – Good Friday
- 19 April – Easter Saturday
- 20 April – Easter Sunday
- 21 April – Easter Monday
- 28 April – Kenneth Kaunda Birthday
- 1 May – Labour Day
- 25 May – Africa Day
- 7 July – Heroes' Day
- 8 July – Unity Day
- 4 August – Farmers' Day
- 18 October – National Prayer Day
- 24 October – Independence Day
- 25 December – Christmas Day

== Deaths ==
- 7 April – Edith Nawakwi, 65, minister of finance (1998–1999).
- 5 June – Edgar Lungu, 68, president (2015–2021).
- 3 September – Tapson Kaseba, 32, footballer (Konkola Blades, NAPSA Stars, national team).
