= Death and state funeral of Edgar Lungu =

Death and funeral of Edgar Lungu, sixth president of Zambia

Edgar Chagwa Lungu, the sixth president of Zambia, died on 5 June 2025 in Pretoria, South Africa, at the age of 68, while undergoing treatment for cardiac complications related to an undisclosed illness. A seven-day period of national mourning was declared by the Zambian government, later extended by nine more days, was cut short to 12 days due to a standoff with his family. Following initial disagreements between his family and the Patriotic Front over state protocols, a compromise was reached. Lungu's body was scheduled for repatriation to Lusaka on 18 June 2025, with a state funeral planned for 22 June and burial on 23 June at Embassy Park, the official burial ground for Zambian presidents. Upon arrival, the body was to be received with full military honours and taken to his residence to lie in state. From 19 to 21 June, it would have been placed at the Mulungushi International Conference Center in Lusaka for public viewing.

However, on 18 June, the Lungu family abruptly halted the planned repatriation, accusing the government of breaching the terms of the agreement. The following day, President Hakainde Hichilema formally ended the national mourning period, stating that Zambia could not remain in a state of indefinite mourning. He affirmed that Lungu deserved to be buried in Zambia with full honours and added, "Our doors, as Government, remain open for further engagement, as appropriate." The decision marked an unprecedented moment in Zambian history: the conclusion of an official mourning period before the burial of a former head of state. On 20 June 2025, the Lungu family announced that the former president would instead be buried in South Africa at a private ceremony, this marks the first time a former head of state of another country would be buried in South Africa. On 24 June 2025, the Government of the Republic of Zambia, through the Attorney General, commenced legal proceedings in the High Court of South Africa (Gauteng Division, Pretoria) seeking to halt the intended private burial of former President Edgar Lungu in South Africa, pending a judicial determination of his official burial location. On 8 August 2025, the court ruled in favour of the Zambian government, upholding the state's right to repatriate and accord a state funeral to Lungu. This was immediately appealed by Lungu's family and, in June 2026, overturned - allowing the family to determine his burial.

== Illness and death ==
In 2015, it was publicly disclosed that Edgar Lungu was receiving treatment abroad for achalasia, a rare disorder affecting the oesophagus. In June 2021, he collapsed during a televised military commemoration in Lusaka due to a hypoglycaemic episode, which doctors later attributed to complications from achalasia. In early 2025, Lungu travelled to South Africa to receive specialised medical care for an undisclosed illness. By late May, statements from his family indicated that his condition was stable, though public speculation remained high. On the morning of 5 June 2025, Lungu died in Pretoria following cardiac complications during surgery at Mediclinic Medforum Hospital. He was 68 years old. Following the announcement, the Zambian government declared a seven-day period of national mourning, with flags flown at half-mast across the country. The Government of Mozambique also announced three days of national mourning in his honour.

== Funeral arrangements ==
The Government of Zambia announced a state funeral for the late sixth Republican president, Edgar Chagwa Lungu, on 7 June 2025, two days after his death in South Africa. President Hakainde Hichilema declared seven days of national mourning from 8 to 14 June 2025. Secretary to the Cabinet, Patrick Kangwa, stated that Lungu's remains were expected to arrive on 11 June, with full funeral details to follow. Disagreements soon arose between the government and the Lungu family—alongside senior Patriotic Front officials—regarding funeral protocols and burial arrangements. A private memorial service was held on 10 June at the Cathedral of the Sacred Heart in Pretoria, South Africa, attended by Lungu's widow, Esther Lungu, daughter Tasila Lungu, and PF officials. The family expressed grievances over alleged mistreatment and called for an independent investigation into the circumstances surrounding his death.

On 12 June, the government appealed for patience as discussions continued. On 13 June, Vice President Mutale Nalumango responded to criticism, stating that holding a state funeral in the absence of the sitting president would be inappropriate. That same day, President Hichilema publicly affirmed that Lungu would be buried in Zambia and not in any foreign country, emphasizing respect for national dignity and unity. A breakthrough was reached on 15 June, with both the government and the family agreeing to proceed with a state funeral. The Cabinet Office confirmed that Lungu's body would be repatriated on 18 June aboard a private charter, followed by a period of lying in state at his residence in Chifwema from 19 to 21 June. The body is scheduled to be transported to the Mulungushi International Conference Centre daily for public viewing, ahead of a state funeral on 22 June and burial at Embassy Park on 23 June. The South African government, through its Department of International Relations and Cooperation (DIRCO), confirmed its role in facilitating the repatriation and extended condolences to Zambia.

On 18 June, the family abruptly halted the repatriation process, accusing the government of violating the agreed terms. Family spokesperson Makebi Zulu announced that the remains would not be returned that day, citing a breakdown in trust and uncertainty over when the body would be brought back. He expressed hope that Lungu would "someday" be buried in Zambia.

On 19 June 2025, President Hakainde Hichilema formally ended the national mourning period, citing the ongoing impasse over the repatriation of Edgar Lungu's remains. In his address, he noted that despite reaching an agreement on 15 June, the family's abrupt refusal to proceed on 18 June necessitated the conclusion of the official mourning to allow the nation to return to normalcy. He apologised to South Africa and reaffirmed that Lungu deserved a burial in Zambia with full honours.

=== Funeral Program ===
Following Lungu's death, negotiations unfolded between the Zambian government and the Lungu family over the nature of his funeral. According to family spokesperson Makebi Zulu, the late president had expressed a wish that "President Hakainde Hichilema should not come anywhere near his body." The Patriotic Front party, which Lungu once led, initially rejected the offer of a state funeral, opting instead to hold its own program at the party secretariat in Lusaka. The Zambian government designated Belvedere Lodge as the official mourning venue for former President Lungu; however, the site remained largely unoccupied. The PF also designated its party secretariat in Lusaka as an alternative mourning venue. Large crowds gathered there, with many mourners preferring it over the government-assigned Belvedere Lodge, which remained largely unoccupied.

Despite initial resistance, a compromise was reached between the government and the family. It was announced that the body would arrive in Lusaka on 18 June 2025 aboard a private chartered aircraft. Upon arrival, the body was to be received with full military honours and transported to his residence in Chifwema for a private vigil. From 19 to 21 June, the government planned for public viewing at the Mulungushi International Conference Centre (MICC), followed by a state funeral on Sunday, 22 June and burial at Embassy Park on Monday, 23 June.

On 18 June, hours before the scheduled repatriation, the family abruptly halted the process, accusing the government of breaching agreed funeral terms. In response, President Hichilema formally ended the national mourning period on 19 June, citing the need to bring closure. On 20 June 2025, the Lungu family announced that the former president would instead be buried in South Africa at a private ceremony, citing the ongoing standoff with the Zambian government and failure to implement the agreed funeral plan. On 24 June 2025, the Government of Zambia filed a lawsuit in an attempt to halt the planned burial of former President Edgar Lungu in South Africa. According to information shared online, a requiem mass is scheduled to take place on the morning of 25 June 2025 at the Cathedral of Christ the King in Johannesburg. In court documents filed by the Attorney General, the Zambian government requested a halt to the burial of former President Lungu until all legal and procedural disputes concerning his final resting place were resolved. The government argued that, in accordance with Zambian law and public interest, Lungu should be buried in Zambia with full military honours, customs, and traditions. In response, the family stated that the funeral would proceed as planned, asserting they had not been officially served with any legal documents.

== Presidential address ==
On 19 June 2025, President Hakainde Hichilema delivered a national address marking the 14th day since the passing of former President Edgar Lungu. In the speech, he acknowledged the nation's pain, thanked traditional leaders, the church, diplomatic envoys, and South Africa's President Cyril Ramaphosa for their cooperation during the mourning period. Hichilema stated that the Zambian government had made consistent efforts to engage the Lungu family in order to give the late president a dignified state funeral. He noted that although a mutual agreement had been reached on 15 June and preparations for repatriation had been made—including military honours arranged by the South African Defence Force—the family's decision to withhold the body on 18 June had disrupted the process.

Hichilema emphasized that Zambia could not remain in a state of indefinite mourning and officially announced the end of the national mourning period, effective 19 June 2025. He reiterated that while Lungu was a family member, he also belonged to the nation and deserved to be buried in Zambia with full honours. Hichilema extended an apology to South Africa for the failed repatriation and stated that government doors remained open for further dialogue. He concluded by urging the nation to remain united and uphold peace.

== Legacy and public perception ==
Edgar Lungu served as Zambia's sixth president from January 2015 to August 2021, overseeing a period marked by infrastructure development, economic turbulence, and increasing political polarisation. His presidency saw major road projects, the construction of hospitals and schools, and the expansion of electricity access. Critics, however, pointed to rising public debt, increased government borrowing, and shrinking democratic space during his tenure. His government was accused of suppressing dissent and restricting press freedom, especially in the lead-up to the 2021 general elections. After leaving office, Lungu returned to active politics in late 2023, reignited debate over Zambia's constitutional term limits. In 2024, the Constitutional Court ruled that he had already served two full terms and was ineligible to run again. Lungu's death reignited national conversations about political transition, reconciliation, and the role of past leaders in shaping Zambia's future. While his legacy remains contested, he is remembered as a pivotal figure in Zambia's democratic journey and a symbol of peaceful power transition in 2021.

== Political Tensions and Funeral Disputes ==
Lungu's death revealed underlying political fractures in Zambia's leadership landscape. Although President Hakainde Hichilema expressed condolences and called for unity, describing the moment as one of national grief, his relationship with Lungu had long been marked by political rivalry and personal hostility. According to the Lungu family, one of his dying wishes was that President Hichilema should "not come near his body," reflecting lingering tensions even after his death.

The government initially declared a seven-day period of national mourning, later extended to 12 days, and announced plans for a state funeral at Embassy Park in Lusaka. However, the Patriotic Front (PF) and members of Lungu's family resisted some aspects of the government's program, citing Lungu's personal wishes and opting instead for alternative arrangements, including a vigil at the PF Secretariat in Lusaka.

Tensions escalated when the family halted the repatriation of Lungu's body from South Africa, accusing the government of breaching the agreed funeral protocols. In response, President Hichilema formally ended the national mourning period on 19 June 2025, citing the inability to remain in a state of indefinite mourning.

Further complicating matters, PF officials accused the government of having mistreated Lungu in his final years, alleging political persecution and medical neglect. They claimed the former president was denied permission to travel for medical care, a charge the government strongly denied.

On 20 June 2025, the Lungu family announced that they would proceed with burying the late president in South Africa, citing unresolved disagreements with the state. The PF described this development as "regrettable but understandable," acknowledging the family's right to determine final rites for the former head of state. The disputes and competing funeral plans sparked widespread public discourse and raised questions about the state of Zambia's political civility and institutional cohesion.

On 23 June 2025, South Africa's Minister in the Presidency, Khumbudzo Ntshavheni, reaffirmed that the burial was conducted in accordance with the wishes of Lungu's family. The minister clarified that South Africa had no political role in the decision and was simply facilitating what had been requested by the late President's relatives.

On 25 June, Lungu's burial, which had been scheduled on that day, was suspended after the Pretoria High Court granted a request by the Zambian government to postpone the event pending a final decision on the location. On 8 August, the court ordered Lungu's family to repatriate his remains to Zambia and allow the government to hold a state funeral for him. An appeal from Lungu's family was rejected with finality on 16 September.

== Reactions ==
Lungu's death triggered a wide range of responses from political leaders, regional bodies, religious organisations, and citizens across Zambia and beyond. On 5 June 2025, President Hakainde Hichilema issued a statement expressing condolences to the Lungu family, describing his predecessor as "a leader who served Zambia during a challenging period." He called for national unity and asked Zambians to "mourn with dignity and compassion." Between 6 and 10 June, opposition parties and former cabinet members from Lungu's administration paid tribute, noting his leadership during Zambia's economic recovery efforts and COVID-19 pandemic response. Across social media, tributes poured in from Zambians who remembered Lungu as a man of faith and humility, while others pointed to his controversial third-term ambitions and political comeback attempts. Despite past divisions, calls for peaceful mourning dominated public discourse.

On 19 June 2025, amid growing public confusion, State House issued a clarification stating that President Hichilema had not unilaterally ended the national mourning period. The government emphasized that the 12-day mourning had concluded as originally planned, and not cancelled prematurely as speculated. On 21 June 2025, the Patriotic Front (PF), through its acting president Given Lubinda, issued a statement describing the decision to bury Lungu in South Africa as "regrettable but understandable." The party acknowledged the deep divisions between the family and government and urged the public to remain calm and respectful during the final proceedings. Meanwhile, State House issued a clarification stating that President Hichilema had not "cancelled" the national mourning period, but rather acknowledged its end as initially declared, following disagreements with the family over funeral arrangements.

Internationally, regional leaders including Mozambican President Filipe Nyusi and Namibian President Netumbo Nandi-Ndaitwah sent condolence messages. The African Union and SADC also acknowledged Lungu's role in regional diplomacy and conflict resolution.
