= Moses Hamungole =

Zambian bishop (1967–2021)

- Bishop of Monze
- Church: Catholic Church
- Diocese: Diocese of Monze
- In office: 10 February 2014 – 13 January 2021
- Predecessor: Emilio Patriarca
- Successor: Raphael Mweempwa

Orders
- Ordination: 6 August 1994
- Consecration: 3 May 2014 by Emilio Patriarca

Personal details
- Born: 1 May 1967 Kafue, Central Province, Zambia
- Died: 13 January 2021 (aged 53) Lusaka, Zambia

Moses Hamungole (1 May 1967 – 13 January 2021) was a Zambian prelate of the Catholic Church who was bishop of Monze from 2014 to 2021.

== Life ==
Hamungole was born in Zambia and ordained to the priesthood on 6 August 1994.

He was head of the English Africa section of the Rome-based Vatican Radio from 2010 to 2014.

Pope Francis appointed him bishop of Monze on 10 February 2014 and he received his episcopal consecration on 3 May from his predecessor Bishop Emilio Patriarca.

He died of COVID-19 during the COVID-19 pandemic in Zambia in 2021.
