= 2020 in Zambia =

- Decades: 2000s; 2010s; 2020s
- See also: Other events of 2020; Timeline of Zambian history

== Incumbents ==
- President: Edgar Lungu

== Events ==
- 18 March – First case of the COVID-19 pandemic in Zambia
- 22 March – A third case was recorded. The patient was a man who had travelled to Pakistan.
- 25 March – President Edgar Lungu confirmed a total of 12 cases during a live national address.
- 2 April – Zambia records its first death from COVID-19.
- 8 September – President Lungu joins students at Copperbelt University (CBU) in mourning the death of "Mafishi," a large fish thought to bring students good luck.
- 13 November – Finance Minister Bwalya Ng’andu says that Zambia is defaulting on its debt.

== Deaths ==
- 16 August – Alexander Grey Zulu, 95, Zambian politician, Minister of Commerce and Industry (1964) and Defence (1970–1973).

== See also ==
- COVID-19 pandemic in Zambia
- COVID-19 pandemic in Africa
- 2020 in East Africa
- 2020 in Angola
- 2020 in Botswana
- 2020 in Namibia
- 2020 in Zimbabwe
