= 2026 in Zambia =

- Decades: 2000s; 2010s; 2020s
- See also: Other events of 2026; Timeline of Zambian history

Events in the year 2026 in Zambia.

== Events ==
=== February ===
- 4 February –
  - Ghana and Zambia agree to abolish visa requirements for each other’s citizens.
  - A Tanzanian drug trafficker is arrested in Lusaka during a Zambian Drug Enforcement Commission raid, as authorities seize a total of 1,380.8 kg (3,044 lb) of cannabis and cough syrup containing codeine; several other Zambian and Burundian nationals are also detained.
- 10 February – The High Court orders the seizure of more than $1.3 million in assets from Dalitso Lungu, the son of former president Edgar Lungu, citing failure to adequately explain the circumstances of their acquisition.
- 16 February – The government bans the import of livestock and related products from South Africa due to an outbreak of foot-and-mouth disease.
- 24 February – National Democratic Congress secretary general Mambwe Zimba is arrested over an altered picture of president Hichilema.

=== March ===
- 15 March – A minibus collides with another vehicle in Kalomo District, killing eight people and injuring 12 others.

=== April ===
- 23 April – A court in South Africa orders the return of former president Edgar Lungu’s body, shortly after the Zambian government claimed it had taken possession of the remains.

=== August ===
- 13 August – 2026 Zambian general election: Hakainde Hichilema is elected to a second term as president with at least 60% of the vote.
- 14 August – Police arrest 11 people in Lusaka, including opposition candidate Brian Mundubile on suspicion of plotting an insurrection.
- 30 August – Opposition politician Brian Mundubile is charged with treason.

=== September ===
- 1 September – Hakainde Hichilema is sworn in for a second term as president.

== Holidays ==
- 1 January – New Year's Day
- 8 March – International Women's Day
- 12 March – Youth Day
- 3 April – Good Friday
- 4 April – Holy Saturday
- 5 April – Easter Sunday
- 6 April – Easter Monday
- 28 April – Kenneth Kaunda's Birthday
- 1 May – Labour Day
- 25 May – Africa Day
- 6 July – Heroes' Day
- 7 July – Unity Day
- 3 August – Farmers' Day
- 18 October – National Prayer Day
- 24 October – Independence Day
- 25 December – Christmas Day

== Deaths ==
- 15 May – Telesphore George Mpundu, 68, Roman Catholic prelate, coadjutor archbishop (2004–2006) and archbishop (2006–2018) of Lusaka
- 15 May – Guy Scott, 82, vice president (2011–2014) and president (2014–2015)
