= 2019 in Zambia =

- Decades: 1990s; 2000s; 2010s; 2020s
- See also: Other events of 2019; Timeline of Zambian history

Events in the year 2019 in Zambia.

== Incumbents ==
- President: Edgar Lungu
- Vice-President: Inonge Wina
- Chief Justice: Irene Mambilima

== Deaths ==
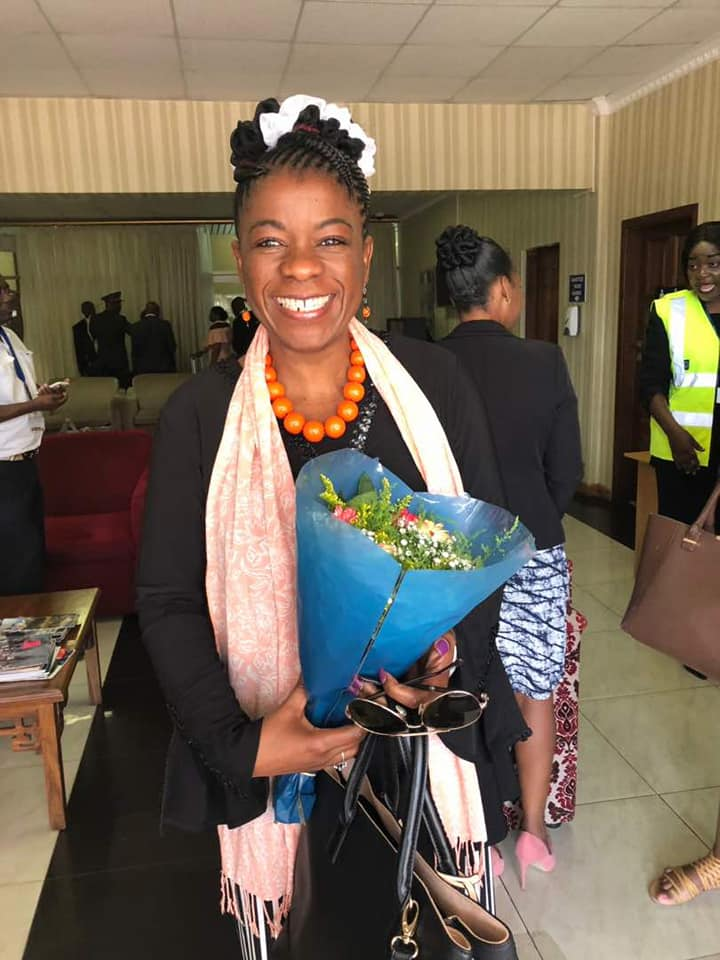
Brenda Muntemba in 2018

- 21 January – Lupando Mwape, politician, Vice-President 2004–2006 (born c. 1950).
- 19 March – Brenda Muntemba, diplomat (b. 1970).
