= 2024 in Zambia =

- Decades: 2000s; 2010s; 2020s
- See also: Other events of 2024; Timeline of Zambian history

Events in the year 2024 in Zambia.

== Incumbents ==
| Photo | Post | Name |
|---|---|---|
| U.S. Vice President Kamala Harris meets with Hakainde Hichilema | President of Zambia | Hakainde Hichilema |
| | Vice President of Zambia | W.K. Mutale Nalumango |

== Events ==
=== Ongoing ===
- 2024 Zambian drought

=== January ===
- 11 January – Around 300 people are confirmed dead in an outbreak of cholera that affects eight of the country's ten provinces.

=== May ===
- 31 May – Esther Lungu, the wife of former President Edgar Lungu, is arrested along with her daughter Chiyeso Katete and a family friend on suspicion of money laundering.

=== July ===
- 24 July – Guntila Muleya, the director of the Independent Broadcasting Authority, is found dead with gunshot wounds outside Lusaka.

=== August ===
- 7 August – Muzala Samukonga wins a bronze medal in the 2024 Summer Olympics in the Men's 400 metres, setting a new national record for Zambia and earning Zambia's first Olympic medal in 28 years.
- 11–12 August – The border between the Democratic Republic of the Congo and Zambia is closed due to a dispute over the importation of beverages from Zambia.
- 22 August – A health warning is raised over the consumption of contaminated maize following the deaths of 400 dogs nationwide in July due to aflatoxins found in samples of the crop.
- 25 August – Nine people are killed in a collapse at an illegal gravel quarry in Chongwe.

=== October ===
- 7 October –
  - Ten miners are killed in a mine collapse in Mumbwa District.
  - President Hakainde Hichilema announces an agreement with China to build Zambia's first manufacturing facility for cholera vaccines.
- 10 October – The first case of mpox in Zambia is recorded in a 32-year old visitor from Tanzania.
- 30 October – Eight miners are killed and another is reported missing following a copper mine collapse in Chingola.

=== November ===
- 20 November – Authorities announce the arrest of MP Jay Emmanuel Banda, who is wanted on robbery charges, in Zimbabwe.

=== December ===
- 10 December – The Constitutional Court bars former President Edgar Lungu from running again for president in elections scheduled in 2026 for having already served a maximum of two terms.
- 20 December – Two people are arrested on suspicion of plotting to hex President Hichilema on behalf of the brother of fugitive MP Jay Emmanuel Banda.

== Holidays ==
- 1 January - New Year's Day
- 21 February - National Youth Day
- 8 March – International Women's Day
- 12 March – Youth Day
- 29 March – Good Friday
- 30 March – Easter Saturday
- 31 March - Easter Sunday
- 1 April - Easter Monday
- 28 April – Kenneth Kaunda Birthday
- 1 May - Labour Day
- 25 May - Africa Day
- 1 July - Heroes' Day
- 2 July - Unity Day
- 5 August - Farmers' Day
- 18 October – National Prayer Day
- 24 October – Independence Day
- 25 December – Christmas Day

== Deaths ==
- 13 August – Maureen Mwanawasa (b. 1963), First Lady of Zambia (2002–2008).
- 7 November – John Phiri, 75, politician.
