= 1996 in Zambia =

- Decades: 1970s; 1980s; 1990s; 2000s; 2010s
- See also: Other events of 1996; Timeline of Zambian history

== Incumbents ==
- President: Frederick Chiluba

== Events ==
- November 18 – 1996 Zambian general election: Frederick Chiluba is re-elected President.
- December 15 – The Zambia Open golf tournament becomes part of the Sunshine Tour for the first time. It is won by Desvonde Botes of South Africa.

== Births ==
- November 27 – Felix Kashweka, journalist and publicist

== Deaths ==
- May 23 – Kapambwe Mulenga, footballer, 33

== See also ==
- 1996 in East Africa
