= Government of the Republic of Zambia v Lungu Family & Others =

2025 South African court case

- Court: High Court of South Africa (Gauteng Division, Pretoria)
- Full case name: Government of the Republic of Zambia v Esther Lungu, Bertha Lungu, Tasila Lungu, Dalieso Lungu, Chiyeso Lungu, Charles Phiri, Makebi Zulu, and Two Mountains
- Started: 25 June 2025
- Decided: 8 August 2025
- Verdict: Judgment in favour of the Government of the Republic of Zambia
- Citation: Case No. 096565/2025

Case history
- Subsequent action: Application for leave to appeal filed by the Lungu family

Court membership
- Judges sitting: Justice Ledwaba AJP, Justice Modau ADJP, Justice Potterill J

Case opinions
- State funeral protocol overrides private preference in matters of national interest

Government of the Republic of Zambia v Lungu Family & Others was a legal case heard in the High Court of South Africa, Gauteng Division, Pretoria, in 2025. The case arose following the death of former Zambian President Edgar Lungu, who passed away in South Africa in June 2025. A dispute emerged between the Zambian government and members of Lungu's family regarding the location and protocol for his burial.

The family expressed a preference for a private burial in South Africa and opposed the participation of sitting President Hakainde Hichilema in the funeral proceedings. Conversely, the Zambian government sought to repatriate the body to Zambia and conduct a state funeral with full honors at Embassy Park, the official burial site for presidents.

On 8 August 2025, the High Court ruled in favor of the Zambian government, holding that a binding agreement existed between the parties for the repatriation and state burial. The court emphasized that, under Zambian law and in accordance with public policy, the national interest in honoring a former head of state overrides the private wishes of the deceased or their family. The court further ordered the immediate surrender of Lungu's remains to the Zambian authorities for repatriation and burial in Lusaka.

== Background ==
Former Zambian President Edgar Lungu died on 5 June 2025 in Pretoria, South Africa. He had travelled to the country for medical treatment. Following his death, the Zambian government announced a period of national mourning and outlined plans to repatriate his remains for a state funeral and burial at Embassy Park, the official burial site for former presidents in Zambia. However, the Lungu family objected to the government's arrangements, citing personal and political concerns, and instead opted to bury the former president privately in South Africa. The family stated that they were not served with any court order and thus intended to proceed with the funeral as planned.

== Legal Action ==
On 24 June 2025, the Attorney General of Zambia filed an urgent court application in South Africa to stop the burial. The lawsuit, filed in the Gauteng High Court, names as respondents members of the Lungu family, their lawyer Makebi Zulu, and a South African funeral services company, Two Mountains Pty Ltd. The Zambian government argued that the burial of a former head of state is a matter of national importance and should be conducted with full military honours in accordance with Zambian law. The Attorney General cited Article 177(5)(c) of the Constitution of Zambia as the basis for the government's intervention in the matter.

On 25 June, Lungu's burial, which had been scheduled on that day, was suspended after the Pretoria High Court granted a request by the Zambian government to postpone the event pending a final decision on the location. On 8 August, the court ruled in favor of the Zambian government's demand for Lungu's repatriation to Zambia. An appeal from Lungu's family was rejected with finality on 16 September.

== See also ==
- Edgar Lungu
- Death and state funeral of Edgar Lungu
- Embassy Park
- Politics of Zambia
