= Diocese of Monze =

Roman Catholic diocese in Zambia

Coordinates: 16.2759°S 27.4762°E

Diocese of Monze Dioecesis Monzensis

Location
- Country: Zambia
- Ecclesiastical province: Lusaka
- Metropolitan: Lusaka

Statistics
- Area: 62,160 km^{2} (24,000 sq mi)
- Population: Total; Catholics: (as of 2004); 1,400,000; 168,200 (12.0%)

Information
- Rite: Latin Rite
- Cathedral: Cathedral of the Sacred Heart of Jesus

Current leadership
- Pope: Leo XIV
- Bishop: Raphael Mweempwa
- Bishops emeritus: Emilio Patriarca

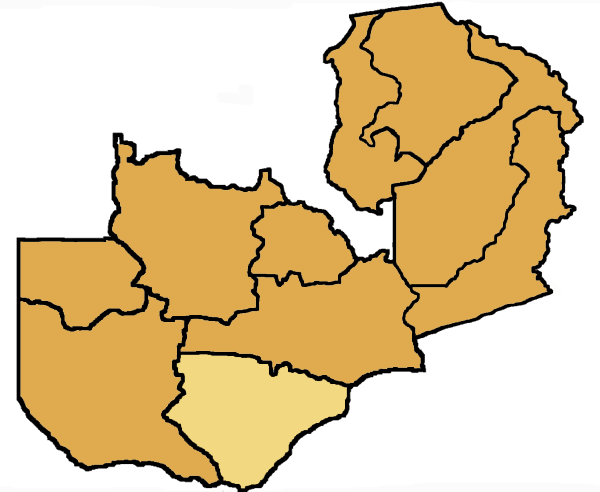
Map of the Diocese of Monze, Zambia.

The Roman Catholic Diocese of Monze (Latin: Monzen(sis)) is a diocese located in Monze in Zambia.

== History ==
- March 10, 1962: Established as Diocese of Monze from the Metropolitan Archdiocese of Lusaka

== Bishops ==
- James Corboy, S.J. (10 March 1962 – 26 November 1991)
- Paul Lungu, S.J. (26 November 1991 – 29 April 1998)
- Emilio Patriarca (22 June 1999 – 10 February 2014)
- Moses Hamungole (10 February 2014 – 13 January 2021)
- Raphael Mweempwa (25 February 2022 – present)

== See also ==
- Roman Catholicism in Zambia
