= Guntila Muleya =

Zambian businessman (1980 - 2024)

Director General of the Independent Broadcasting Authority
- In office 6 May 2024 – 25 July 2024
- Preceded by: Josephine Mapoma
- Succeeded by: TBA

Personal details
- Born: Guntila Muleya; 4 April 1980 Lusaka, Zambia
- Died: July 2024 (aged 44) Njolwe, Lusaka
- Spouse: Ngoza Muleya (m. 2009)
- Children: 3
- Occupation: Marketeer; Businessman

Guntila Muleya (4 April 1980 – July 2024) was a Zambian businessman and Director General of the Independent Broadcasting Authority (IBA) of Zambia from May 6, 2024, until his assassination in July 2024.

== Career ==
On 6 May 2024, Muleya was appointed Director General of the Independent Broadcasting Authority (IBA) of Zambia, he served in that position until his assassination in July 2024.

== Awards ==
Year	Award	Category	Result
2012	GOtv Africa	Manager of the year	Won

== Death ==
Muleya is believed to have been abducted on the night of 23 July 2024, as he did not show up home after work that day. His family informed the Police and a search for him was started. On 24 July 2024, His body was found in Njolwe area of Lusaka with gunshot wounds.
