= 2015 in Zambia =

- Decades: 1990s; 2000s; 2010s; 2020s
- See also: Other events of 2015; Timeline of Zambian history

The following lists events that happened during 2015 in Zambia.

== Incumbents ==
- President: Guy Scott (until 25 January), Edgar Lungu (starting 25 January)
- Vice-President: Inonge Wina (starting 25 January)
- Chief Justice: Ernest Sakala (until 2 March), Irene Mambilima (starting 2 March)

== Events ==
=== January ===
- 20 January – Voters in Zambia go to the polls for a presidential election following the October 2014 death of incumbent President Michael Sata. Defence Minister Edgar Lungu (the Patriotic Front) and Hakainde Hichilema (the United Party for National Development) seek the office.
- 21 January – Heavy rains in Zambia cause delays in voting and counting in the presidential election with announcements to resume the next day.
- 24 January – Edgar Lungu of the ruling Patriotic Front party wins the Zambian presidential election.
