= Brenda Muntemba =

Zambian diplomat (1970–2019)

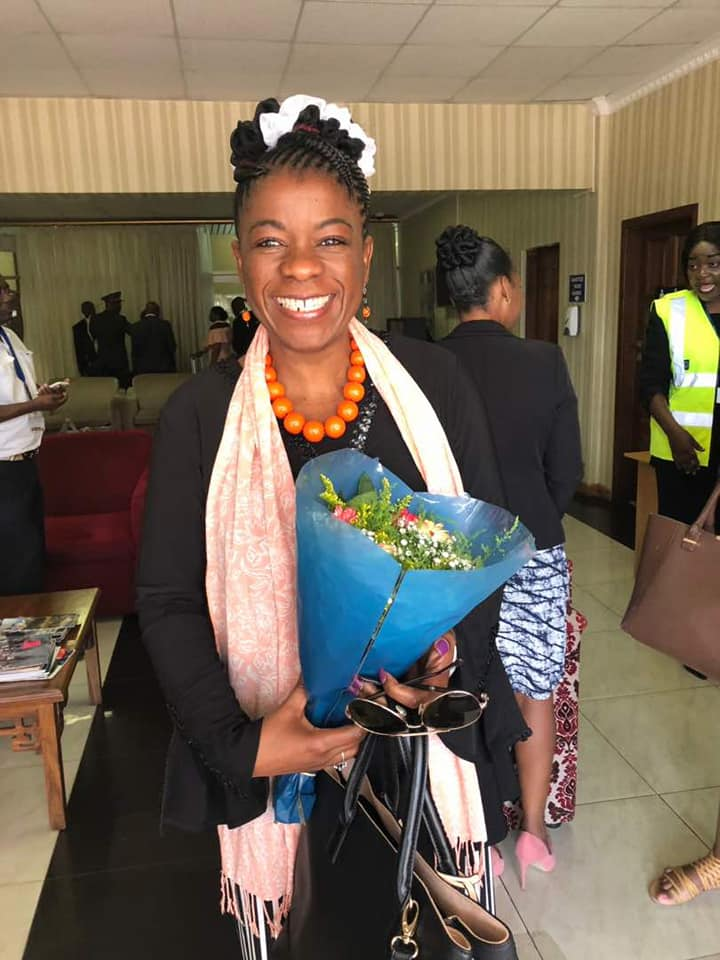
Brenda Muntemba attending the Push Women Awards, 2018.

Brenda Muntemba (2 July 1970 – 19 March 2019) was a Zambian diplomat who was serving as the Zambian high commissioner to Kenya at the time of her death. She had also served as the commissioner of police for Southern Province and UNESCO's chief program officer in Zambia. She was a school teacher between 1993 and 1995 at Leopards Hill High School and was also a part-time radio presenter for Radio Phoenix and Christian Voice. Muntemba authored and published four motivational books, under Langmead and Baker: Off Duty (2011) In Retrospect (2013), Secrets Unveiled (2015) and The Architect (2018).

== Education ==
Because her father Bradley Chesters Muntemba was a police officer, Muntemba and her two sisters, Hazel and Priscilla, attended many primary schools around Zambia. These included Northrise in Ndola, Lotus and Northmead and Jacaranda in Lusaka, Hillside in Chipata, and Livingstone Primary in Livingstone.

She attended Roma Girls Secondary School between 1982 and 1987 and graduated with a bachelor of arts (French major and Economics minor) from the University of Zambia in July 1993. She then proceeded to obtain a specialised masters in translation (French into English) from Marc Bloch University, Strasbourg, France in 2001. Muntemba also undertook leadership training under the United States government's 'Leadership Exchange Programme' and the British Council's 'Making a Difference Leadership Programme', offered to government leaders. She held a certificate in copyright and related rights from the World Intellectual Property Organisation (WIPO).

== Career ==
When Michael Sata was elected as Zambia's fifth president, he appointed several women to positions of authority. Muntemba was appointed Police Commissioner for Southern Province in 2011, alongside five other senior police women commissioners. In 2012, she went back to police headquarters as Commissioner Operations. Her tenure in this post was short-lived, as she was transferred to the Cabinet Office following political misgivings. During this time, the Cabinet Office assigned her to the Ministry of Education as Zambia’s chief programmes officer for UNESCO (July 2013 – February 2015), a position that constantly took her back to her country of language training, France. On 2 February 2015, President Edgar Lungu appointed her into foreign service and she retired from the police service. Her first posting was as High Commissioner to Kenya.

== Personal life ==
Muntemba was born in Kitwe, to parents Bradley Chesters Muntemba and Hilary Mulenga. Bradley was an officer in the Zambia Police Service, having joined as a direct-entry cadet sub inspector in 1967, and died as assistant commissioner of police, commanding officer, central province of Zambia at the age of 48 years old.

Mulenga served twice as a commissioner during the Mung’omba and Mwanakatwe Constitution Review Commissions, and was one of the founding members of the Women’s Lobby Group in Zambia, as well as the Business and Professional Women’s Association.

Muntemba married Reverend Sulanji Andrew Sichilembe on 27 October 2006, at Lusaka’s Anglican Cathedral of the Holy Cross. She was later ordained as a pastor on 30 December 2012, by Apostle Gift Ntitima at the Under Jesus is Life Church, Lusaka. They had a daughter, Lukundo Mirriam Nachilembe.

== Death ==
Muntemba was involved in a head-on road collision on 26 February 2019 and was admitted to hospital, where she died on 19 March. She was 48.
