= 2023 in Zambia =

- Decades: 2000s; 2010s; 2020s
- See also: Other events of 2023; Timeline of Zambian history

Events in the year 2023 in Zambia

== Incumbents ==
| Photo | Post | Name |
|---|---|---|
| Kamala Harris meets with Hakainde Hichilema | President of Zambia | Hakainde Hichilema |
| | Vice President of Zambia | W.K. Mutale Nalumango |

== Events ==
Ongoing — COVID-19 pandemic in Zambia

- 4 January – ZESCO, Zambia's largest power company, announces increased power cuts from six hours to twelve hours as a result of lower water levels at the Kariba Dam between Zambia and Zimbabwe.
- 20 September – The oldest known wooden structure, a 476,000 year old log structure, is discovered at the Kalambo Falls in Zambia according to a study from the Nature journal.
- 12 October – International Monetary Fund managing director Kristalina Georgieva confirms that Zambia, the first African nation to default following the COVID-19 pandemic, has agreed to a debt agreement with foreign creditors, concerning US$6.3 billion of its debt.

== Deaths ==
- 7 January – Philemon Mulala, 59–60, Zambian footballer (Mufulira Wanderers, Cape Town Spurs, national team), injuries sustained from dog attack.
