= Felix Kashweka =

Zambian journalist and publicist

Felix Swana Kashweka (born 27 November 1996) is a Zambian journalist and publicist.

Born in Kitwe and raised in Lusaka. Felix begun his journalism career in 2008 when he was a presenter for a Kids Show on Muvi TV (Zambia's popular private TV station), when he was in seventh grade the following year he applied for internship from Zed Kids News Editor and was accepted. During his stay at Zed Kids News Felix met South African president Jacob Zuma from which he was recognized by the public eye that he was Zambia's youngest writer and The South African president was very pleased with the young man and offered him tertiary education sponsorship at Africa's Rhodes University.

Kashweka was now in the limelight various media organisations wanted him, The Post newspaper did a feature on him and the Editor of Education Post (a supplement of The Post newspaper) got in touch with the young man and from there he has met public figures like Bingu Wa Mutharika, Jacob Zuma, Micheal Sata, Zambia's immediate past president Rupiah Banda, Vice-President Dr. Guy Scott, Brick and Lace, Michael W. Smith, Kirk Franklin, Koffi Olomide, Fally Ipupa, Patience Ozokwor, and Desmond Elliot.

He has written various stories and features that have gained him popularity both at school and in the Zambian community and has had a chance to chat and learn from high-profile journalists like The Post newspaper Editor-in-Chief Fred M'membe and many others maestros in the media.

He is born from father Felix Kashweka Snr (former banker) and mother Patricia Kaonga a businesswoman.
