= Raphael Mweempwa =

Zambian Roman Catholic prelate (born 1974)

- Bishop of Monze, Zambia
- Church: Catholic Church
- Archdiocese: Roman Catholic Archdiocese of Lusaka
- See: Roman Catholic Diocese of Monze
- Appointed: 25 February 2022
- Predecessor: None
- Successor: Incumbent

Orders
- Ordination: 29 June 2002
- Consecration: 7 May 2022 by Gianfranco Gallone
- Rank: Bishop

Personal details
- Born: Raphael Mweempwa; March 30, 1974 (age 51); Monze, Monze Diocese, Zambia

Styles of Raphael Mweempwa
- Reference style: His Grace; The Most Reverend
- Spoken style: Your Grace
- Religious style: Bishop

Raphael Mweempwa (born 30 March 1974) is a Zambian Catholic prelate who is the Bishop of the Diocese of Monze. He was appointed Bishop of Monze on 25 February 2022 by Pope Francis.

== Background and education ==
He was born on 30 March 1974, in the town of Monze, in the Diocese of Monze, Zambia. He attended primary school and secondary school in his home area. He studied Philosophy at St. Augustine Major Seminary in Mpima Mission, Kabwe District, Central Province, Zambia from 1996 to 1998, graduating with a Diploma in Philosophy and Religious Studies. He then transferred to St. Dominic Major Seminary in Lusaka from 1998 until 2002, obtaining the Bachelor's degree in Sacred Theology.

In 2002 he graduated with a Certificate in Pastoral Ministry and another in Catechesis from the Lumko Institute, in South Africa. He obtained a Certificate in Psychological Counseling in 2006, in Zambia. He studied at the Pontifical Urbaniana University in Rome, from 2007 until 2010, graduating with a Licentiate in Canon Law. In 2016, he attended several courses at the Apostolic Signatura and the Roman Rota.

== Priesthood ==
He was ordained a priest on 29 June 2002 he was ordained a priest for the Diocese of Monze. He served as a priest of the Diocese Monze until 25 February 2022.

While he was priest he held the following offices:

- Parish Vicar of St. Mary's Parish in Choma from 2002 until 2004
- Parish Priest of St. Mary's Parish in Choma from 2004 until 2007
- Member of the Diocesan Catechetical Commission from 2006 until 2007
- Parish priest of Our Lady of the Wayside in Manungu, Diocese of Monze from 2010 until 2012
- Diocesan Chancellor from 2011 until 2012
- Member of the Council for Economic Affairs from 2011 until 2019
- Vocational Director and Coordinator of the Formation Team of the Diocese of Monze from 2012 until 2016
- Member of the Presbyterial Council and of the Catechetical Commission from 2013 until 2019
- Coordinator of the Translation Team of the Diocese of Monze, from 2015 until 2019
- Professor of Canon Law and Formator at the St. Dominic Major Theological Seminary in Lusaka from 2019 until 2022.

== As bishop ==
On 25 February 2022 Pope Francis appointed Father Raphael Mweempwa as the Bishop of the Diocese of Monze. Father Mweempwa received episcopal consecration on 7 May 2022 at the hands of Archbishop Gianfranco Gallone, Titular Archbishop of Motula, assisted by Bishop Valentine Kalumba, O.M.I., Bishop of Livingstone and Bishop Emilio Patriarca, Bishop Emeritus of Monze.

== See also ==
- Edwin Mwansa Mulandu
- Catholicism in Zambia

== Succession table ==
Catholic Church titles
Preceded by Emilio Patriarca (1999 - 2014)	Bishop of Diocese of Monze; Since 7 May 2022	Succeeded by Incumbent
