= 2022 in Zambia =

- Decades: 2000s; 2010s; 2020s
- See also: Other events of 2022; Timeline of Zambian history

Events in the year 2022 in Zambia

== Incumbents ==
Photo	Post	Name
Kamala Harris meets with Hakainde Hichilema	President of Zambia	Hakainde Hichilema
	Vice President of Zambia	W.K. Mutale Nalumango

== Events ==
- 24 March – The World Health Organization announces that a polio vaccination campaign will begin in Malawi, Mozambique, Tanzania, and Zambia.
- 24 June – Zambia reports the first suspected cases of monkeypox.
- 15 December – Police in Zambia arrest a truck driver alleged to have transported 27 Ethiopian migrants found dead on the outskirts of Lusaka on Sunday. The bodies were dumped in a farm.
- 23 December – Zambia officially abolishes capital punishment.

== Deaths ==
=== March ===
- 11 March – Rupiah Banda, 85, 4th Republican President of Zambia

=== May ===
- 3 May - Alexander Chikwanda, 83, Finance Minister of Zambia from 2011 to 2016.

== Sports ==
- Zambia women's national football team Qualifies for the 2023 FIFA Women's World Cup for the first time.
- Zambia national football team win the 2022 COSAFA Cup
