= 2018 in Zambia =

- Decades: 1990s; 2000s; 2010s; 2020s
- See also: Other events of 2018; Timeline of Zambian history

This article lists events from the year 2018 in Zambia.

== Incumbents ==
- President: Edgar Lungu
- Vice-President: Inonge Wina
- Chief Justice: Irene Mambilima

== Deaths ==
- 15 May – Wilson Chisala Kalumba, politician (born c. 1964).
- 11 June – Victoria Kalima, politician (b. 1972).

== Links ==
Media related to 2018 in Zambia at Wikimedia Commons
