= 2014 in Zambia =

- Decades: 1990s; 2000s; 2010s; 2020s
- See also: Other events of 2014; Timeline of Zambian history

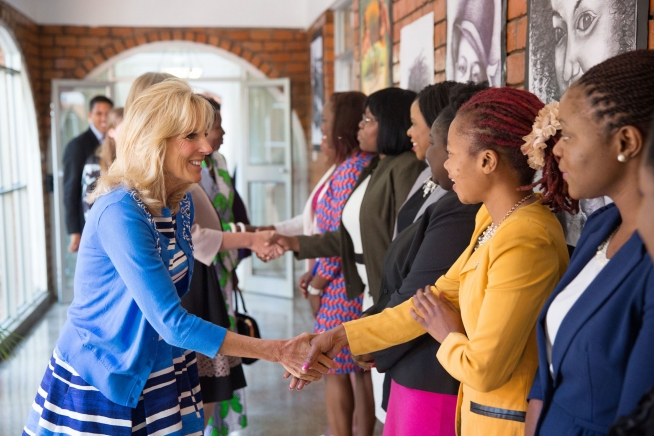
US First Lady Jill Biden greets young women professionals with Dr. Charlotte Scott, Second Lady of Zambia, at the government house, in Lusaka, Zambia, 2 July 2014.

The following lists events that happened during 2014 in Zambia.

== Incumbents ==
- President: Michael Sata (until 28 October), Guy Scott (starting 28 October)
- Vice-President: Guy Scott (until 28 October), vacant thereafter
- Chief Justice: Ernest Sakala

== Events ==
=== October ===
- 28 October – Zambian media reports that President Michael Sata has died while receiving medical care in London.
- 29 October – Guy Scott, the Vice-President of Zambia, becomes the interim President following the death of Michael Sata in London on Tuesday. This made him the first head of state of European White descent in Africa since F. W. de Klerk in 1989, and the first-ever under a democratically elected government.
