= 2009 in Zambia =

- Decades: 1980s; 1990s; 2000s; 2010s; 2020s
- See also: Other events of 2009; Timeline of Zambian history

2009 in Zambia refers to the events that occurred the year 2009 in the Republic of Zambia.

== Crime ==
- Regina Chiluba, wife of former President Frederick Chiluba, was arrested on charges of fraud. On 3 March, she was sentenced to three and half years for illegally receiving government funds and properties.

== Deaths ==
- 6 March: Christon Tembo, former Vice President and Military commander
