= Embassy Park Presidential Burial Site =

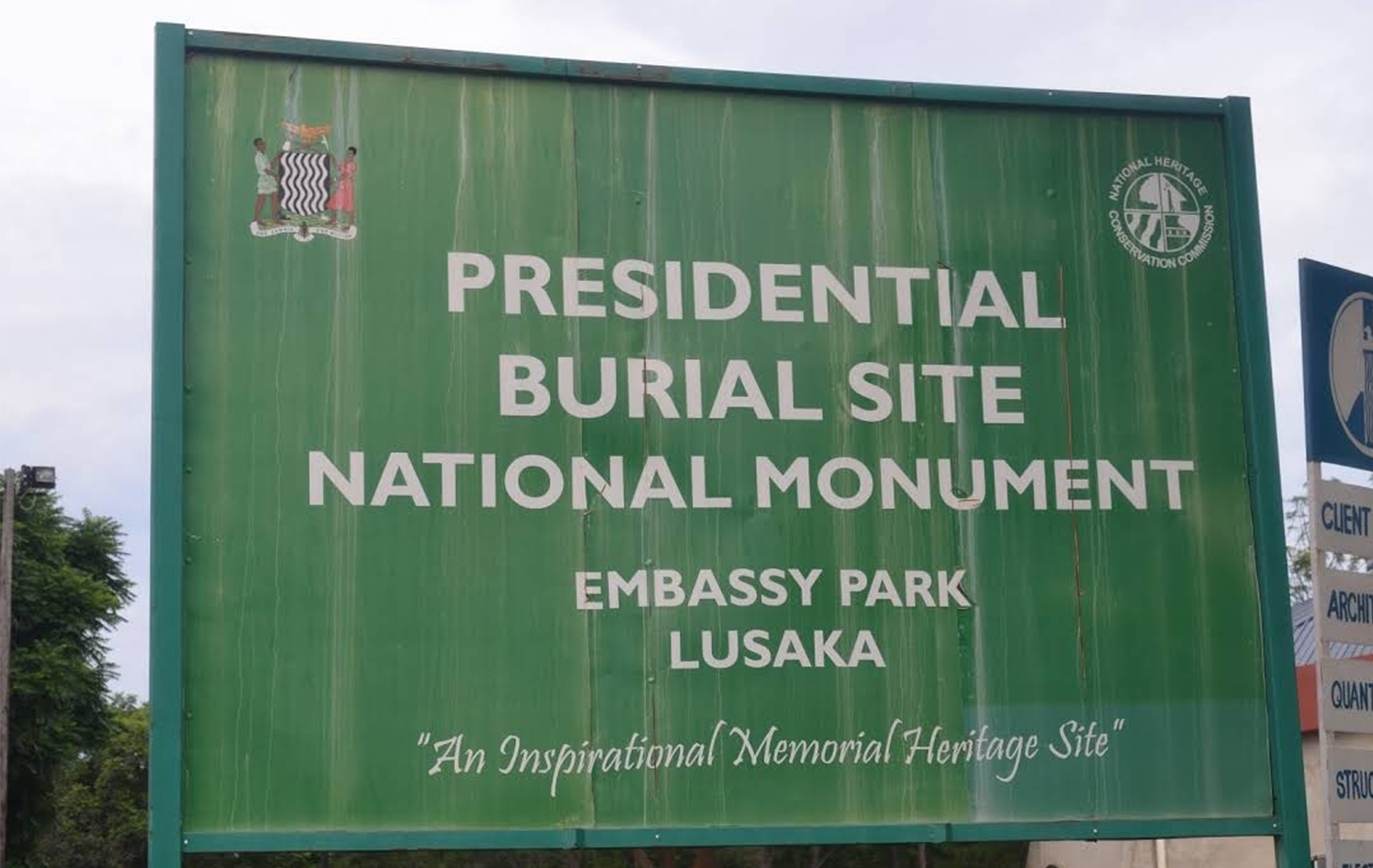
- Embassy Park Presidential Burial billboard
- Interactive map of the Embassy Park Presidential Burial Site area

General information
- Location: Lusaka, Lusaka Province, Zambia
- Coordinates: 15.421740°S 28.309240°E
- Operator: NHCC

Technical details
- Size: 24,654.41 square feet (2,300 m^{2})

Embassy Park Presidential Burial Site (also known as Embassy Park or Embassy Memorial Park) is a national monument and official state burial ground located in Lusaka, the capital city of Zambia. Situated along Independence Avenue opposite the Cabinet Office, the site serves as the final resting place for Zambia's deceased presidents. It was formally designated a National Monument in 2009 and is managed by the National Heritage Conservation Commission (NHCC).

Spanning approximately 24,654.41 square feet (2,300 m^{2}), Embassy Park commemorates the legacy and service of Zambia's former heads of state through architecturally symbolic mausoleums. As of 2025, five presidents are buried at the site: Kenneth Kaunda, Frederick Chiluba, Levy Mwanawasa, Rupiah Banda, and Michael Sata. A planned interment for the sixth president, Edgar Lungu, was cancelled following a publicised dispute between his family and the government, making him the only former Zambian leader buried outside the country.

Embassy Park is open to the public and is considered a site of national reflection, state ceremonial importance, and architectural interest. Each presidential mausoleum incorporates design elements that symbolise the individual's political legacy, values, or key contributions to Zambia's history.

== Presidential mausoleums and grave sites ==
Each president has their own unique design of the mausoleum which symbolise the president's legacy or values.

=== Levy Mwanawasa ===
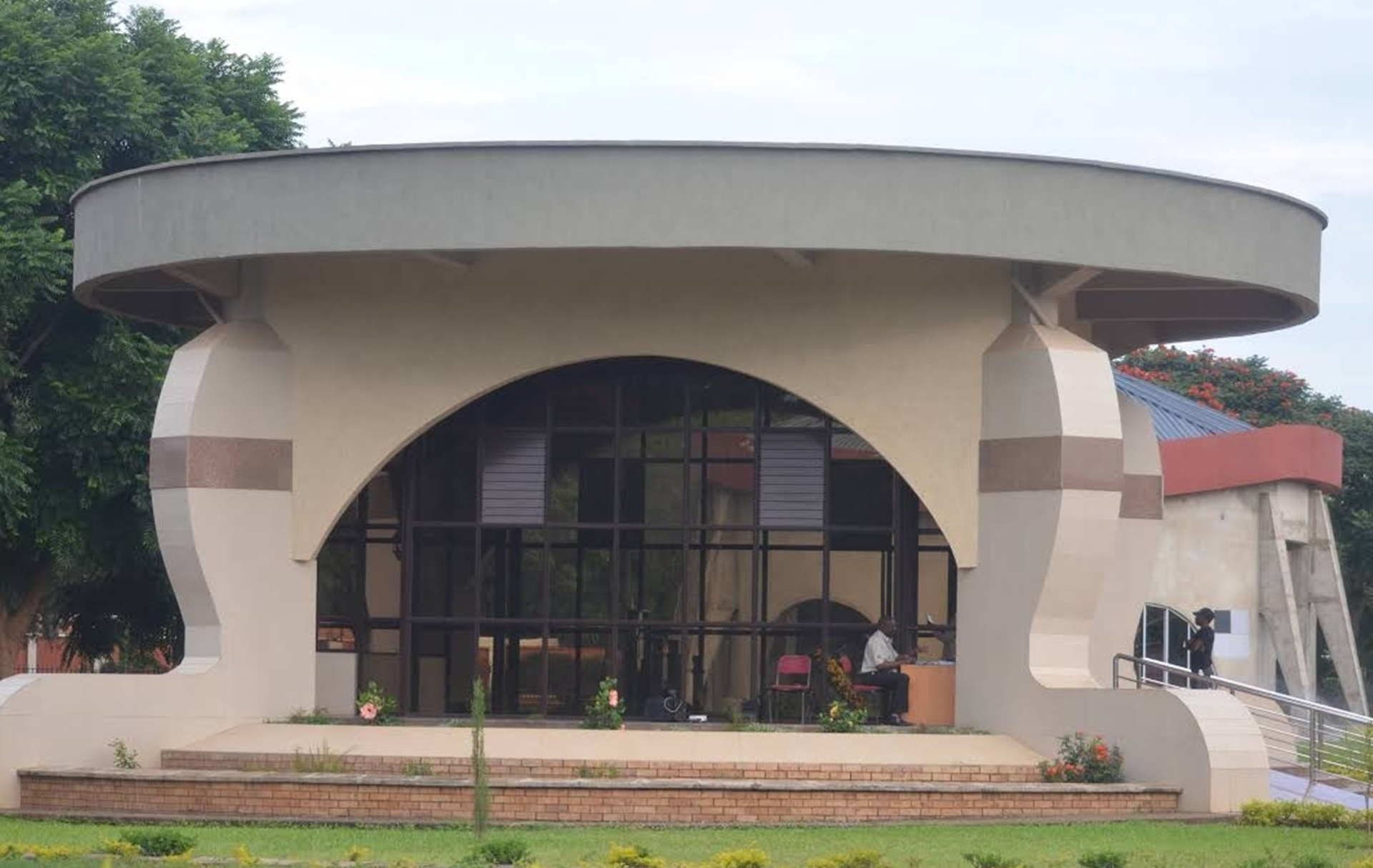
The Mwanawasa mausoleum is the first one at the Presidential Memorial site and is shaped like a stool to represent that he was the first president of Zambia to die while in office.

Levy Mwanawasa's mausoleum, the first at the site, is shaped like a traditional African stool a symbol of authority, marking his death in office in September 2008. Four boot‑shaped pillars convey his commitment to combating corruption, while the staircase rises over eight steps five wide steps for his first complete term and three narrower ones representing his truncated second term. Construction was completed in 2018, at a reported cost of approximately K2.9 billion. He was buried on what would have been his 60th birthday, 3 September 2008.

=== Frederick Chiluba ===
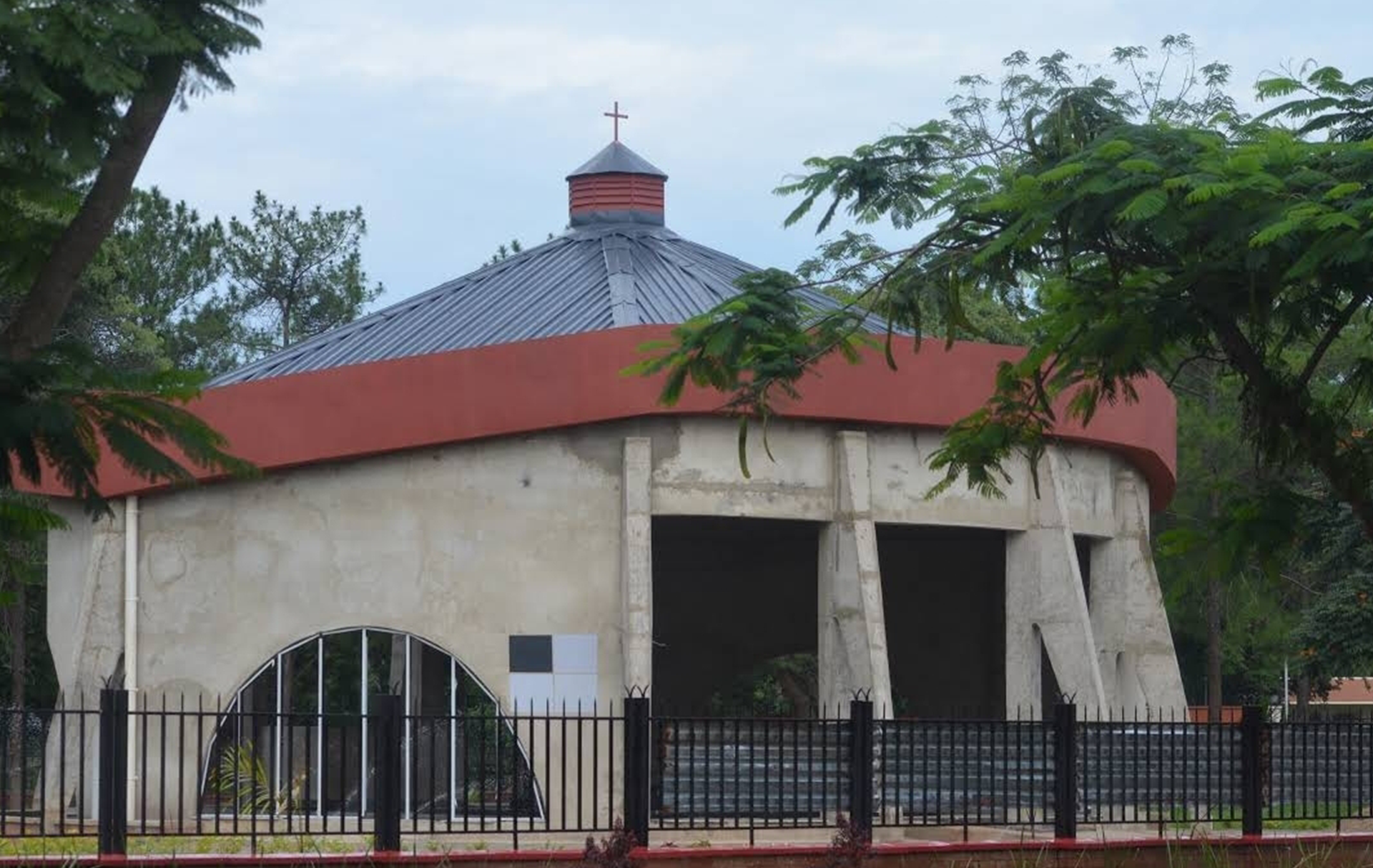
Chiluba's mausoleum is in the design of a chapel, which has a cross on top a symbol of Christianity because he was the President that declared Zambia as a Christian Nation on 29 December 1991

Chiluba's mausoleum is designed in the style of a chapel, topped with a Christian cross in reference to his 1991 declaration of Zambia as a Christian nation. The building features ten pillars one for each year of his two-term presidency and a miniature thatch-roofed structure on the roof symbolising his housing empowerment initiatives. The entrance ramp is shaped like a necktie, reflecting his well-known sartorial elegance.

=== Michael Sata ===
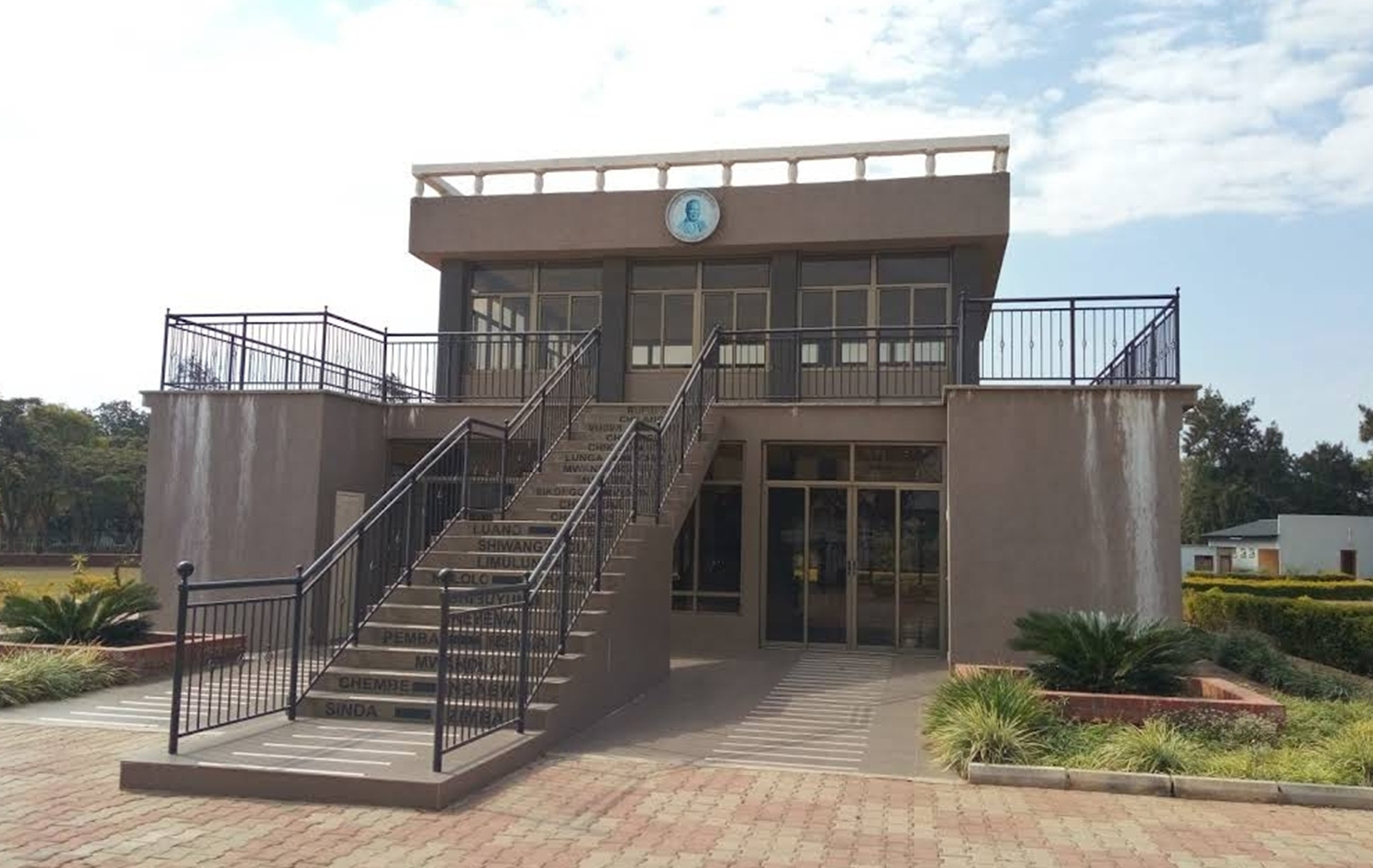
The mausoleum's design is based on King Solomon's Temple in Jerusalem and represents the large-scale infrastructure development that President Sata pursued during his time in office.

Michael Sata's mausoleum is modelled on King Solomon's Temple in Jerusalem, aligning with his promise to govern according to the Ten Commandments. Inside, ten pillars represent Zambia's ten provinces. The commandments are inscribed in both English and Hebrew, and a portrait of Sata at St Ignatius Catholic Church commemorates his pronouncement. Outside, a stairway leads to an upper level whose steps bear the names of the 29 districts created during his presidency.

=== Rupiah Banda ===
Rupiah Banda was interred at Embassy Park in March 2022. His gravesite bears an epitaph: The world is diminished because he was here. Although a mausoleum has been announced, as of mid‑2025 no dedicated structure has been constructed.

=== Kenneth Kaunda ===
Kenneth Kaunda, Zambia's first post-independence president, was buried at Embassy Park in July 2021 after a legal dispute over the burial location. The son had argued that his father had wished to be buried next to his wife. His grave is marked with the national motto "ONE ZAMBIA ONE NATION", reflecting his legacy of national unity. As of 2025, no mausoleum has been erected, though official resolutions suggest one may be built in the future.

=== Edgar Lungu ===
Following the death of Edgar Lungu on 5 June 2025 in Pretoria, South Africa, the sixth president of Zambia, the Zambian government initially announced plans to bury him at Embassy Park on 23 June 2025, alongside other former heads of state. However, on 18 June, Lungu's family abruptly halted the planned repatriation of his remains, citing a breach in the funeral agreement and reiterating the late president's alleged wish that President Hakainde Hichilema should not attend the funeral.

This dispute led to the cancellation of the state burial. On 20 June 2025, the family announced that Lungu would instead be buried in South Africa, making him the first former head of state from another country to be interred on South African soil.
