= COVID-19 pandemic in Zambia =

- Disease: COVID-19
- Pathogen: SARS-CoV-2
- Location: Zambia
- First outbreak: Wuhan, Hubei, China
- Index case: Lusaka
- Arrival date: 18 March 2020 (6 years, 7 months, 1 week and 3 days)
- Confirmed cases: 349,892
- Active cases: 11,770
- Recovered: 307,667
- Deaths: 4,078
- Fatality rate: 1.17%
- Vaccinations: 11,711,565 (total vaccinated); 9,213,802 (fully vaccinated); 13,615,707 (doses administered)

The COVID-19 pandemic in Zambia was a part of the ongoing worldwide pandemic of coronavirus disease 2019 (COVID-19) caused by severe acute respiratory syndrome coronavirus 2 (SARS-CoV-2). The virus was confirmed to have reached Zambia in March 2020.

== Background ==
On 12 January 2020 the World Health Organization (WHO) confirmed that a novel coronavirus was the cause of a respiratory illness in a cluster of people in Wuhan, Hubei, China, which was reported to the WHO on 31 December 2019.

The case fatality ratio for COVID-19 was much lower than that of SARS of 2003, but the transmission was significantly greater, with a significant total death toll. Model-based simulations for Zambia suggested that the 95% confidence interval for the time-varying reproduction number R_{t} exceeded 1.0 in November and December 2020.

== Timeline ==
=== March 2020 ===
- As of 17 March, the government had shut all educational institutions and put in place some restrictions on foreign travel. Zambia reported its first 2 cases of COVID-19 in Lusaka on 18 March. The patients were a couple that had travelled to France on holiday. A third case was recorded on 22 March. The patient was a man who had travelled to Pakistan. On 25 March, President Edgar Lungu confirmed a total of 12 cases during a live national address.
- During March, 36 persons tested positive. All 36 cases remained active at the end of the month.

=== April to June 2020 ===
- Zambia recorded its first death on 2 April. In total during the month, 70 persons tested positive and three died. The number of confirmed cases since the start of the outbreak reached 106. The number of active cases at the end of the month was 48 (an increase of 33% from March).
- By 5 May, the number of COVID-19 deaths had risen to four.
- As of 22 May, Zambia recorded 920 COVID-19 positive cases against 20,011 people screened and tested. The president Edgar Lungu confirmed that the country had recorded 7 deaths and a total number of 336 recoveries.
- On 23 May, Information Minister Dora Siliya tested positive for COVID-19.
- By 27 May, Zambia had recorded a total of 137 new cases in the previous five days, bringing the total to 1,057. Secretary to the Cabinet in Zambia, Dr. Simon Miti, confirmed that the country had recorded 443 recoveries over the previous five days, bringing the total to 779. The recorded deaths remained at 7 and the active cases were at 271.
- On 23 June, the country approved an eight billion kwacha (US$439 million) economic stimulus package through a COVID-19 bond.
- In June there were 437 confirmed cases, bringing the total number of confirmed cases since the start of the outbreak to 1,594. The death toll rose to 24. By the end of the month there were 241 active cases, a decrease by 11% from the end of May.

=== July to September 2020 ===
- There were 4,369 new cases in July, raising the total number of confirmed cases to 5,963. The death toll rose by 127 to 151. The total number of recovered patients reached 3,803. There were 2,009 active cases at the end of the month.
- On 19 August, the Vice President of Zambia, Inonge Wina tested positive for COVID-19. The number of confirmed cases more than doubled on August, to 12,097. The death toll increased to 288. There were 340 active cases at the end of the month.
- There were 2,618 new cases in September, bringing the total number of confirmed cases to 14,715. The death toll rose to 332. The number of recovered patients increased to 13,937, leaving 446 active cases at the end of the month.

=== October to December 2020 ===
- There were 1,417 new cases in October, bringing the total number of confirmed cases to 16,432. The death toll rose to 349. The number of recovered patients increased to 15,680, leaving 403 active cases at the end of the month.
- There were 1,215 new cases in November, bringing the total number of confirmed cases to 17,647. The death toll rose to 357. The number of recovered patients increased to 16,998, leaving 292 active cases at the end of the month.
- The 501.V2 variant was detected in Zambia on 30 December. There were 3,078 new cases in December, raising the total number of confirmed cases to 20,725. The death toll rose to 388. The number of recovered patients increased to 18,660, leaving 1,677 active cases at the end of the month.

=== January to March 2021 ===
- There were 33,492 new cases in January, raising the total number of confirmed cases to 54,217. The death toll nearly doubled to 763. The number of recovered patients increased to 48 thousand, leaving 5,454 active cases at the end of the month.
- There were 24,317 new cases in February, taking the total number of confirmed cases to 78,534. The death toll rose to 1,091. The number of recovered patients increased to 74,498, leaving 2,945 active cases at the end of the month.
- There were 9,884 new cases in March, taking the total number of confirmed cases to 88,418. The death toll rose to 1,208. The number of recovered patients increased to 84,592, leaving 2,618 active cases at the end of the month.

=== April to June 2021 ===
- There were 3,252 new cases in April, taking the total number of confirmed cases to 91,670. The death toll rose to 1,251. The number of recovered patients increased to 90,012, leaving 407 active cases at the end of the month.
- There were 4,151 new cases in May, taking the total number of confirmed cases to 95,821. The death toll rose to 1,282. The number of recovered patients increased to 92,039, leaving 2,500 active cases at the end of the month.
- There were 59,127 new cases in June, raising the total number of confirmed cases to 154,948. The death toll rose to 2,199. The number of recovered patients increased to 131,792, leaving 20,957 active cases at the end of the month.

=== July to September 2021 ===
- There were 40,868 new cases in July, raising the total number of confirmed cases to 195,816. The death toll rose to 3,389. The number of recovered patients increased to 187,236, leaving 5,191 active cases at the end of the month. The number of fully vaccinated persons stood at 149,016.
- There were 10,491 new cases in August, bringing the total number of confirmed cases to 206,327. The death toll rose to 3,602. The number of recovered patients increased to 201,124, leaving 1,601 active cases at the end of the month. The number of fully vaccinated persons stood at 269,513.
- There were 2,719 new cases in September, bringing the total number of confirmed cases to 209,046. The death toll rose to 3,648. The number of recovered patients increased to 204,983, leaving 415 active cases at the end of the month. The number of fully vaccinated persons stood at 409,481.

=== October to December 2021 ===
- There were 688 new cases in October, bringing the total number of confirmed cases to 209,734. The death toll rose to 3,661. The number of recovered patients increased to 205,960, leaving 113 active cases at the end of the month. The number of fully vaccinated persons stood at 535,918.
- There were 435 new cases in November, bringing the total number of confirmed cases to 210,169. The death toll rose to 3,667. The number of recovered patients increased to 206,406, leaving 96 active cases at the end of the month.
- On 4 December, Minister of Health, Sylvia Masebo, disclosed the Omicron variant had been detected in three people in the country.
- There were 44,105 new cases in December, raising the total number of confirmed cases to 254,274. The death toll rose to 3,734. The number of recovered patients increased to 219,794, leaving 30,746 active cases at the end of the month. The number of fully vaccinated persons stood at 1.2 million. Modelling by WHO's Regional Office for Africa suggests that due to under-reporting, the true cumulative number of infections by the end of 2021 was around 8.5 million while the true number of COVID-19 deaths was around 6,080.

=== January to March 2022 ===
- There were 50,773 new cases in January, raising the total number of confirmed cases to 305,047. The death toll rose to 3,917. The number of recovered patients increased to 297,972, leaving 3,158 active cases at the end of the month. The number of fully vaccinated persons stood at 1.7 million.
- There were 7,703 new cases in February, bringing the total number of confirmed cases to 312,750. The death toll rose to 3,952. The number of recovered patients increased to 307,102, leaving 1,696 active cases at the end of the month. The number of fully vaccinated persons stood at 1.9 million.
- There were 4,100 new cases in March, bringing the total number of confirmed cases to 316,850. The death toll rose to 3,966. The number of recovered patients increased to 312,136, leaving 748 active cases at the end of the month. The number of fully vaccinated persons stood at 2.2 million.

=== April to June 2022 ===
- There were 2,883 new cases in April, bringing the total number of confirmed cases to 319,733. The death toll rose to 3,976. The number of recovered patients increased to 315,177, leaving 580 active cases at the end of the month. The number of fully vaccinated persons stood at 2.4 million.
- There were 1,831 new cases in May, bringing the total number of confirmed cases to 321,564. The death toll rose to 3,986. The number of recovered patients increased to 317,036, leaving 542 active cases at the end of the month. The number of fully vaccinated persons stood at 3.3 million.
- There were 4,293 new cases in June, bringing the total number of confirmed cases to 325,857. The death toll rose to 4,006. The number of recovered patients increased to 320,594, leaving 1,257 active cases at the end of the month. The number of fully vaccinated persons stood at 4.5 million.

=== July to September 2022 ===
- There were 3,626 new cases in July, bringing the total number of confirmed cases to 329,483. The death toll rose to 4,015. The number of recovered patients increased to 324,039, leaving 1,429 active cases at the end of the month.
- There were 3,591 new cases in August, bringing the total number of confirmed cases to 333,074. The death toll rose to 4,017.
- There were 476 new cases in September, bringing the total number of confirmed cases to 333,550. The death toll remained unchanged.

=== October to December 2022 ===
- There were 131 new cases in October, bringing the total number of confirmed cases to 333,681. The death toll remained unchanged.
- There were 65 new cases in November, bringing the total number of confirmed cases to 333,746. The death toll rose to 4,019.
- There were 832 new cases in December, bringing the total number of confirmed cases to 334,578. The death toll rose to 4,024.

=== 2023 ===
- There were 14,726 confirmed cases in 2023, bringing the total number of cases to 349,304. The death toll rose to 4,069.

== Statistics ==
=== New cases per day ===
View source data.

=== Deaths per day ===
View source data.

== Impact on education ==
On 17 March 2020, the Zambian government announced that all schools, colleges and universities would be closed on Friday 20 March.

Mr Mabumba said for those who cannot access Television there would be other educational programs on radio. The minister said government would further introduce e-learning and other measures to allow pupils access to education.

== See also ==
- COVID-19 pandemic in Africa
- COVID-19 pandemic by country and territory
- COVID-19 recession in Zambia
